= 2025 G20 Johannesburg summit =

International summit in South Africa

2025 G20 Johannesburg Summit 20th G20 Summit
- 22–23 November 2025
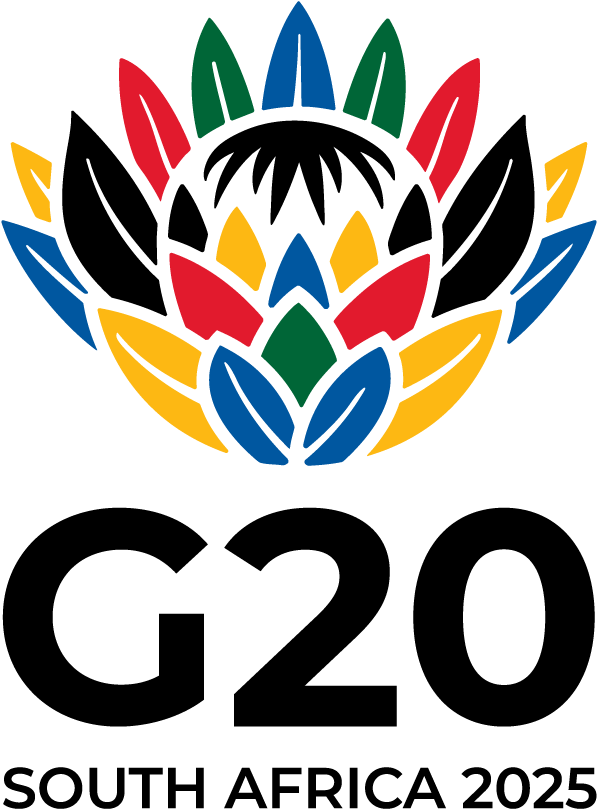

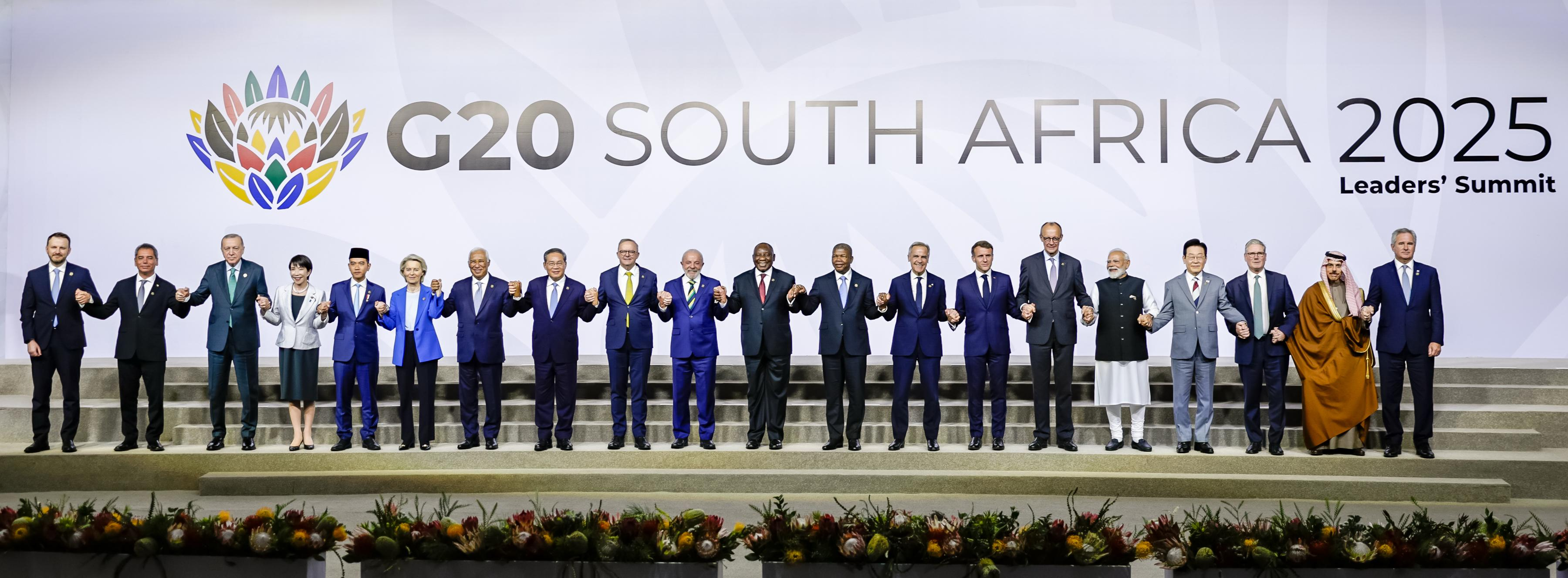
- 2025 G20 summit attendees
- Host country: South Africa
- Motto: Solidarity, Equality, Sustainability
- Cities: Johannesburg
- Venues: Johannesburg Expo Centre
- Participants: G20 members Invited states: Algeria; Egypt; Ethiopia; Finland; Ireland; Jamaica; Malaysia; Namibia; Netherlands; Nigeria; Norway; Qatar; Sierra Leone; Singapore; Spain; United Arab Emirates; Vietnam; Zimbabwe; International bodies: AFDB, CAF, FSB, FAO, IDB, ILO, IMF, LAS, NDB, UN, UNCTAD, UNESCO, World Bank, WHO, WTO
- Chair: Cyril Ramaphosa, President of South Africa
- Website: g20.org

The 2025 G20 Johannesburg summit was the twentieth meeting of the Group of Twenty (G20), a Head of State and Government meeting held at the Johannesburg Expo Centre, Johannesburg, South Africa on 22–23 November 2025. It was the first G20 summit to take place on the African continent. It was also notable for the non-attendance by the top leaders of several major economies, including Chinese leader Xi Jinping and Russian president Vladimir Putin, although they did send participating delegations. The United States did not participate in the summit, despite being a G20 member.

== Presidency ==
South Africa assumed the G20 presidency from 1 December 2024, to November 2025, becoming the first African country to chair the forum; the term coincided with ongoing efforts by the international community to advance the United Nations 2030 Agenda for Sustainable Development.

It marked the fourth consecutive G20 presidency held by a member of the Global South and BRICS, following Indonesia in 2022, India in 2023 and Brazil in 2024. South African officials stated that development issues affecting Africa and other Global South countries would be central to the presidency. President Cyril Ramaphosa reiterated this priority, saying that South Africa would “put Africa's development at the top of the agenda when we host the G20 in 2025”.

The presidency unfolded amid diplomatic tensions. Several preparatory meetings experienced disagreements among member states, and the United States declined to participate in some early sessions, citing concerns with aspects of the agenda. South African Foreign Minister Ronald Lamola stated in response that the G20 “should send a clear message that the world can move on with or without the US".

== Summit theme ==
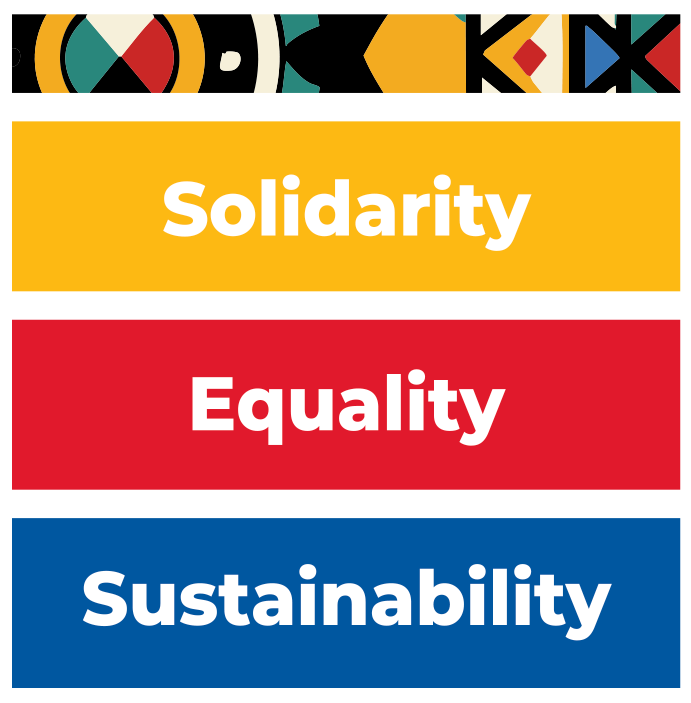

South Africa adopted the theme "Solidarity, Equality, Sustainability" for its presidency.

According to official sources, “solidarity” refers to cooperation across diverse economies, “equality” to promoting fair opportunities between and within countries, and “sustainability” to long-term development that does not compromise future generations.

== Agenda priorities ==
South Africa identified several areas of focus for its presidency, many reflecting themes advanced in earlier G20 presidencies.

- Disaster resilience – strengthening international coordination for responses to climate-related and natural disasters.
- Debt sustainability – supporting improvements to debt-relief mechanisms and transparency for low-income countries.
- Energy-transition finance – mobilising funding for renewable energy.
- Critical minerals – promoting sustainable and locally beneficial development of mineral resources.

Additional high-level priorities were organised within the G20's two traditional workstreams, the Sherpa and Finance Tracks. (Note: The Sherpa Track is composed of personal representatives of G20 leaders, who negotiate and prepare the summit agenda. The Finance Track involves G20 finance ministers and central bank governors and focuses on macroeconomic and financial issues.)

=== High-level priorities ===
- Priority 1 – Inclusive economic growth, industrialisation, employment and reducing inequality
- Priority 2 – Food security
- Priority 3 – Artificial intelligence and innovation for sustainable development

== Preparations ==
The South African government had budgeted R691 million (US$38.7 million) in preparation for the G20 events.

== Sherpa Working Groups ==
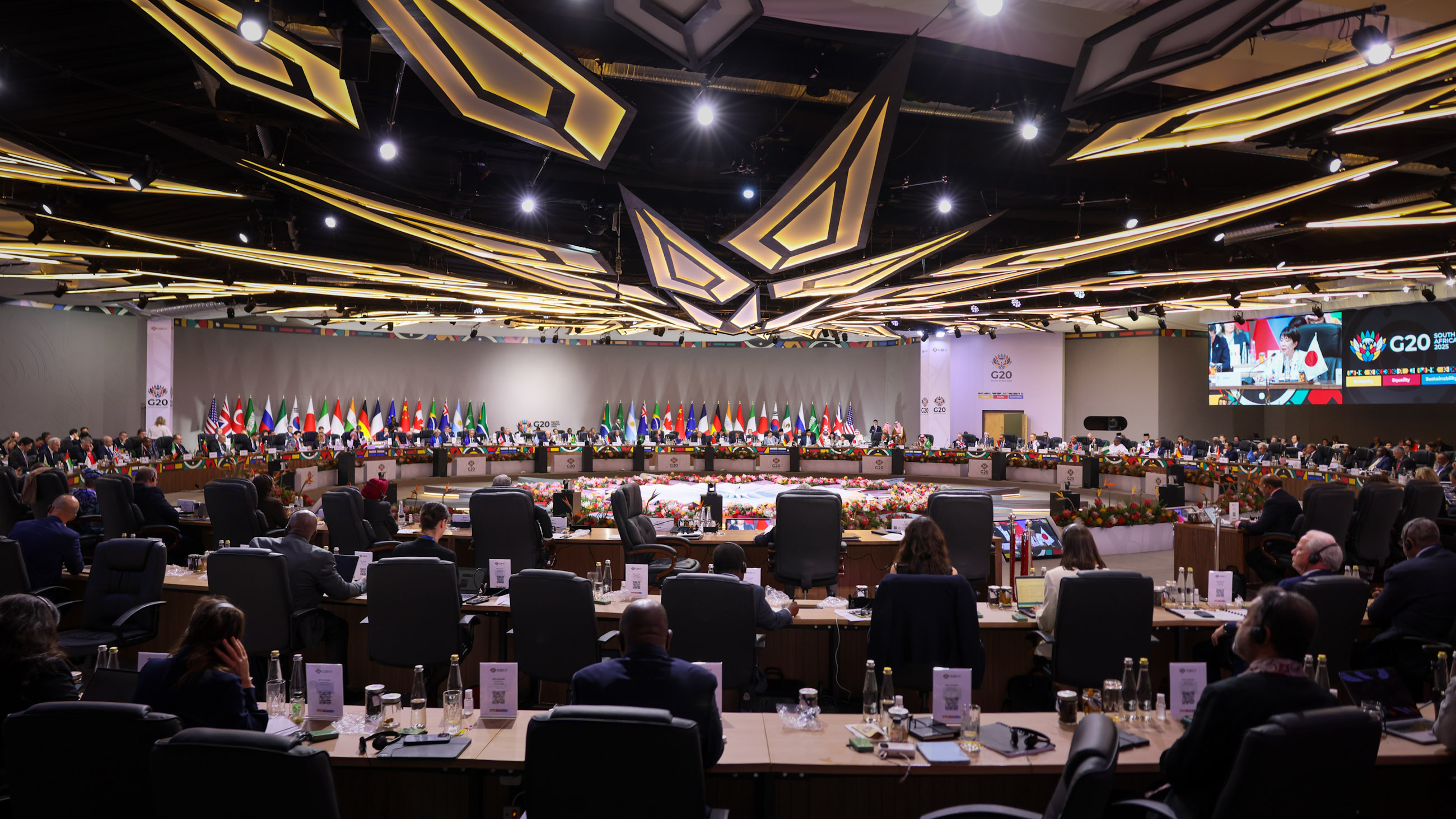
Session of the 2025 G20 Leaders' Summit

The G20 Sherpa Track oversees discussions, discusses the topics that make up the summit's agenda, and coordinates the majority of the work under the direction of the G20 presidents' personal representatives. The Director-General of the Department of International Relations and Cooperation, Mr. Zane Dangor, was appointed as the Sherpa by the South African government. Two Sous-Sherpas, Advocate Nokukhanya Jele and Ambassador Xolisa Mabhongo, deputised the Sherpa.

The Sherpa track is constituted of 15 Working Groups:

1. Agriculture
2. Anti-corruption
3. Culture
4. Development
5. Digital Economy
6. Disaster Risk reduction
7. Education
8. Employment
9. Empowerment of Women Working Group
10. Energy Transitions
11. Environment and Climate Sustainability
12. Health
13. Research and Innovation
14. Tourism
15. Trade and Investment

== Participating leaders ==
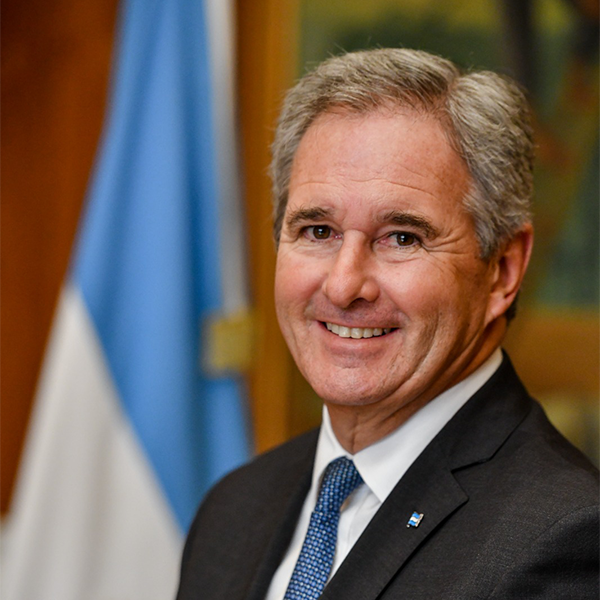
Argentina
Pablo Quirno,
Minister of Foreign Affairs, International Trade and Worship

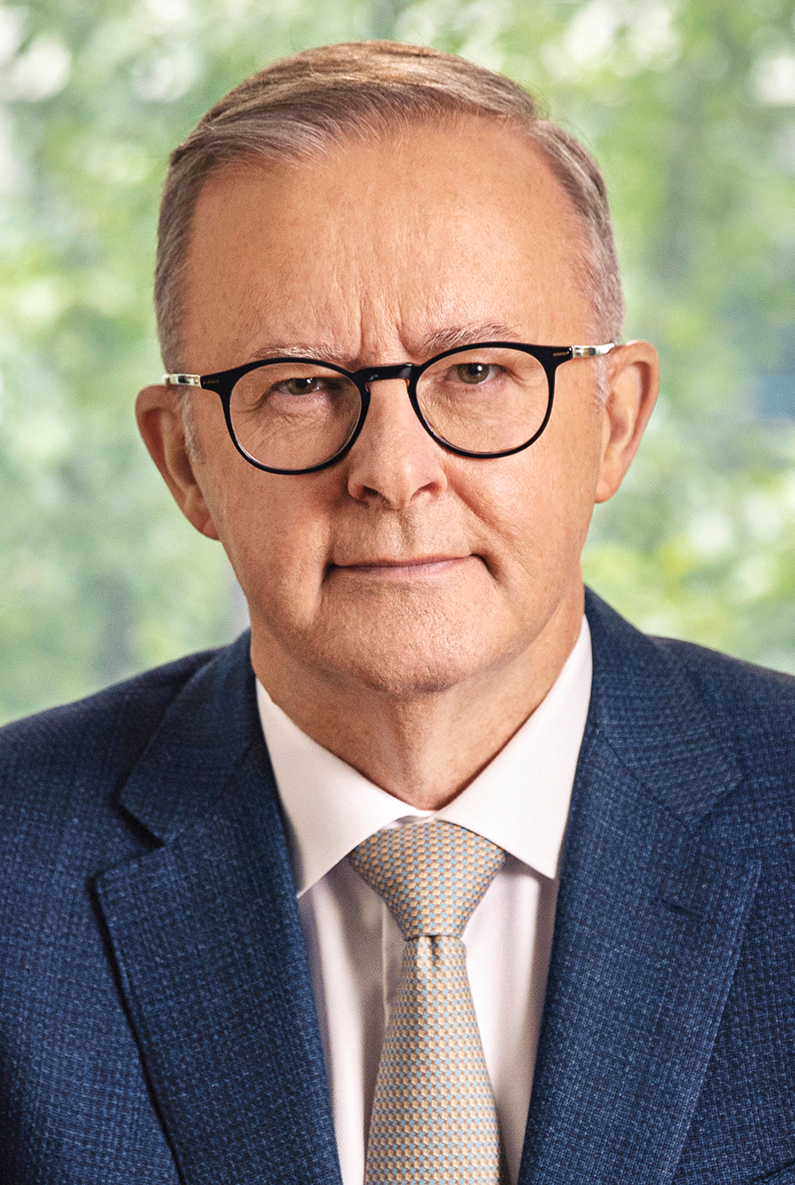
Australia
Anthony Albanese,
Prime Minister

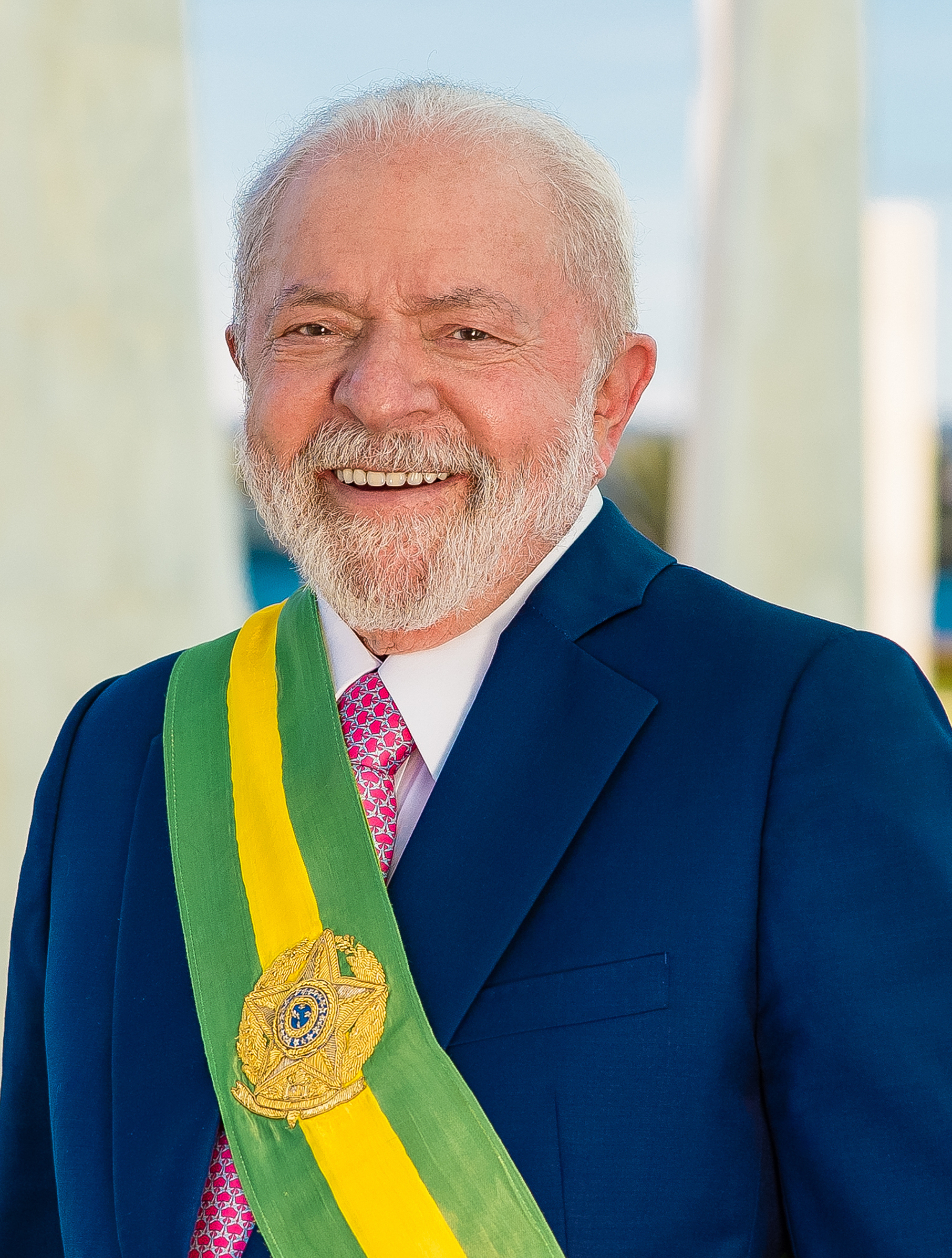
Brazil
Luiz Inácio Lula da Silva,
President

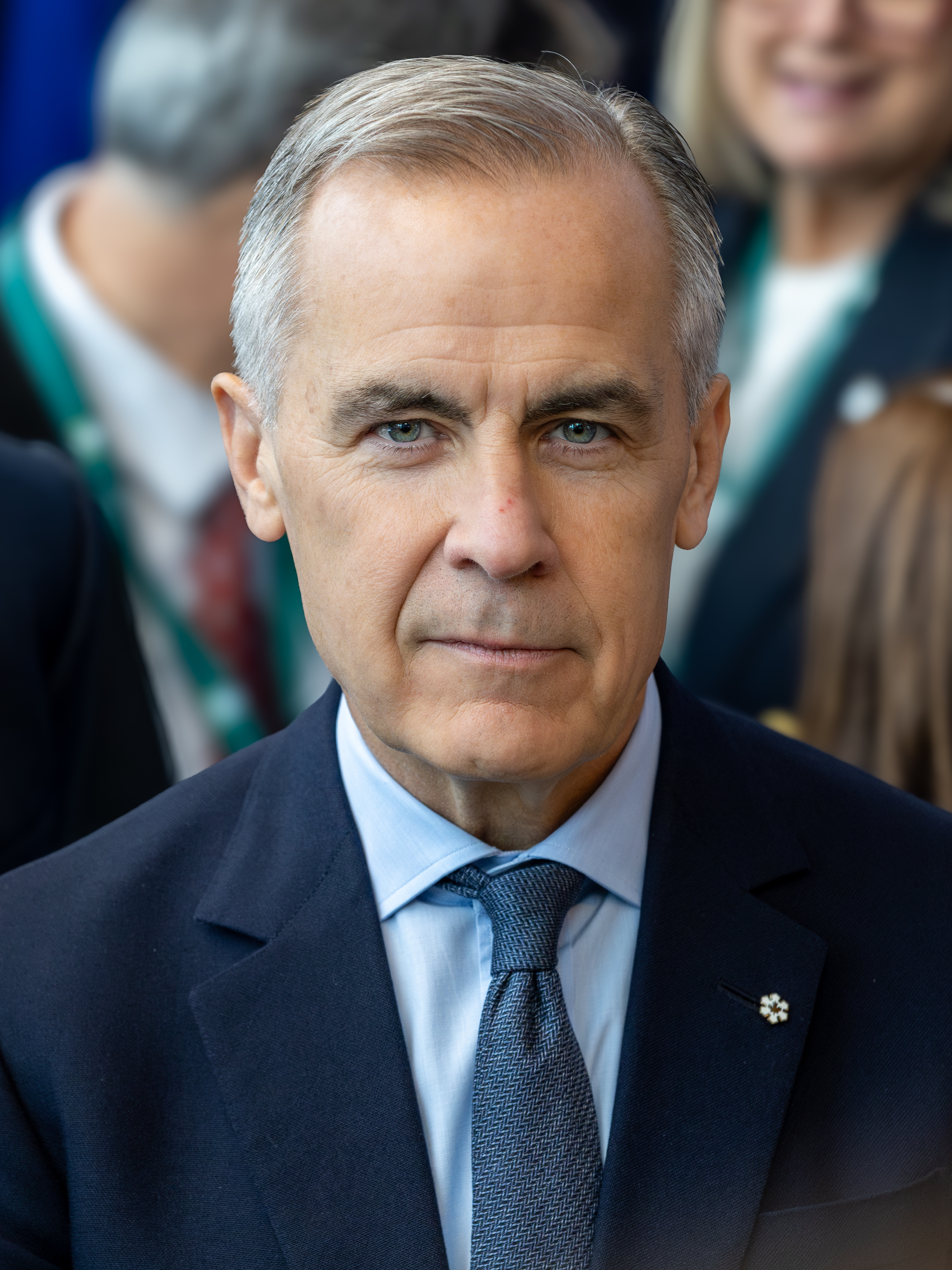
Canada
Mark Carney,
Prime Minister

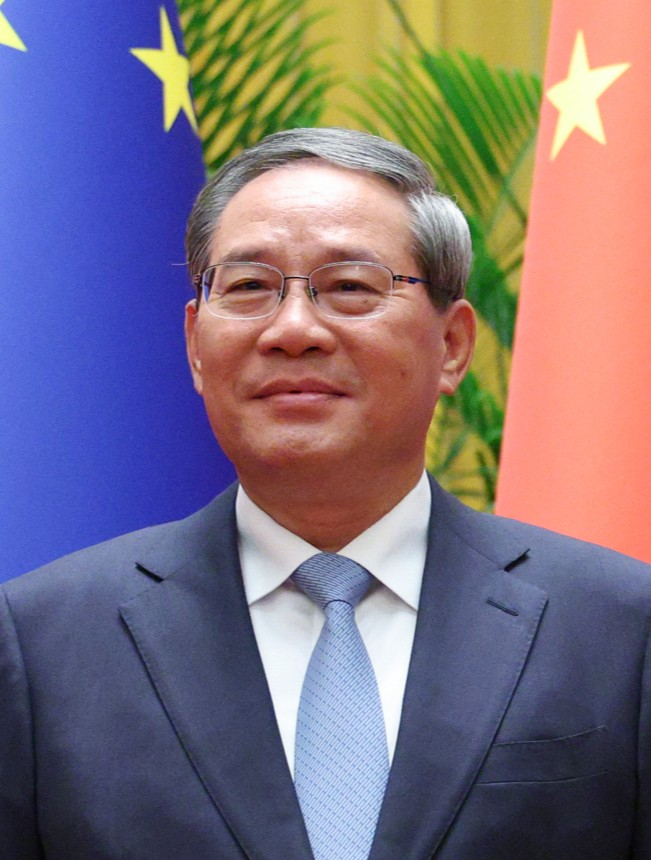
China
Li Qiang,
Premier

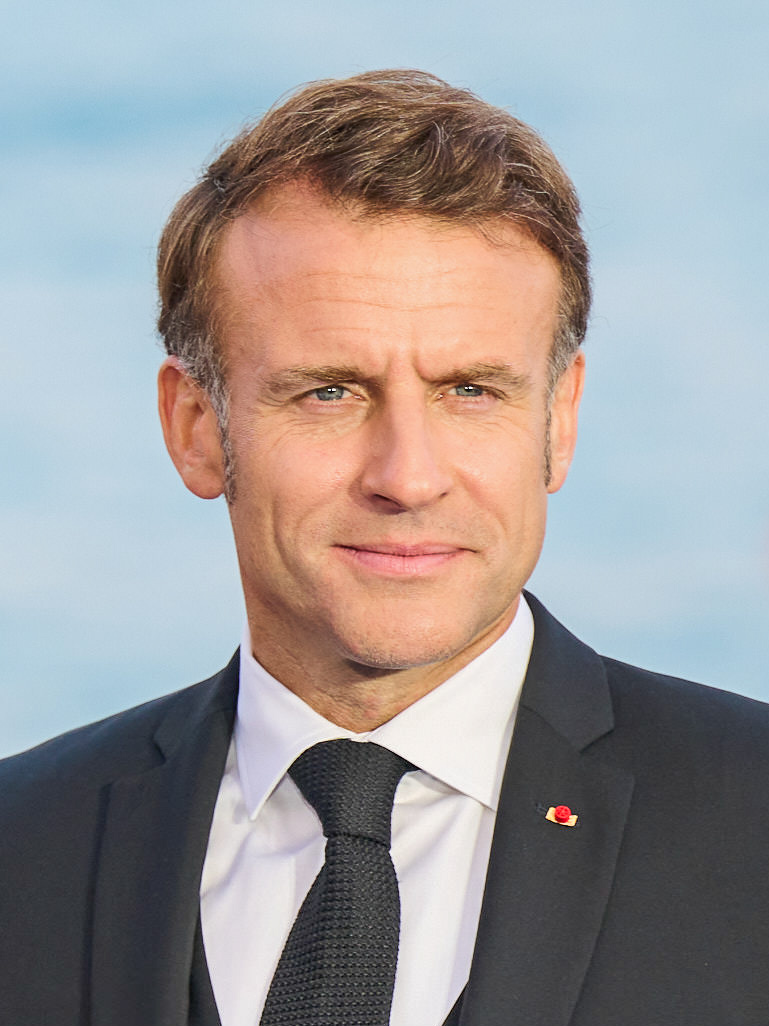
France
Emmanuel Macron,
President

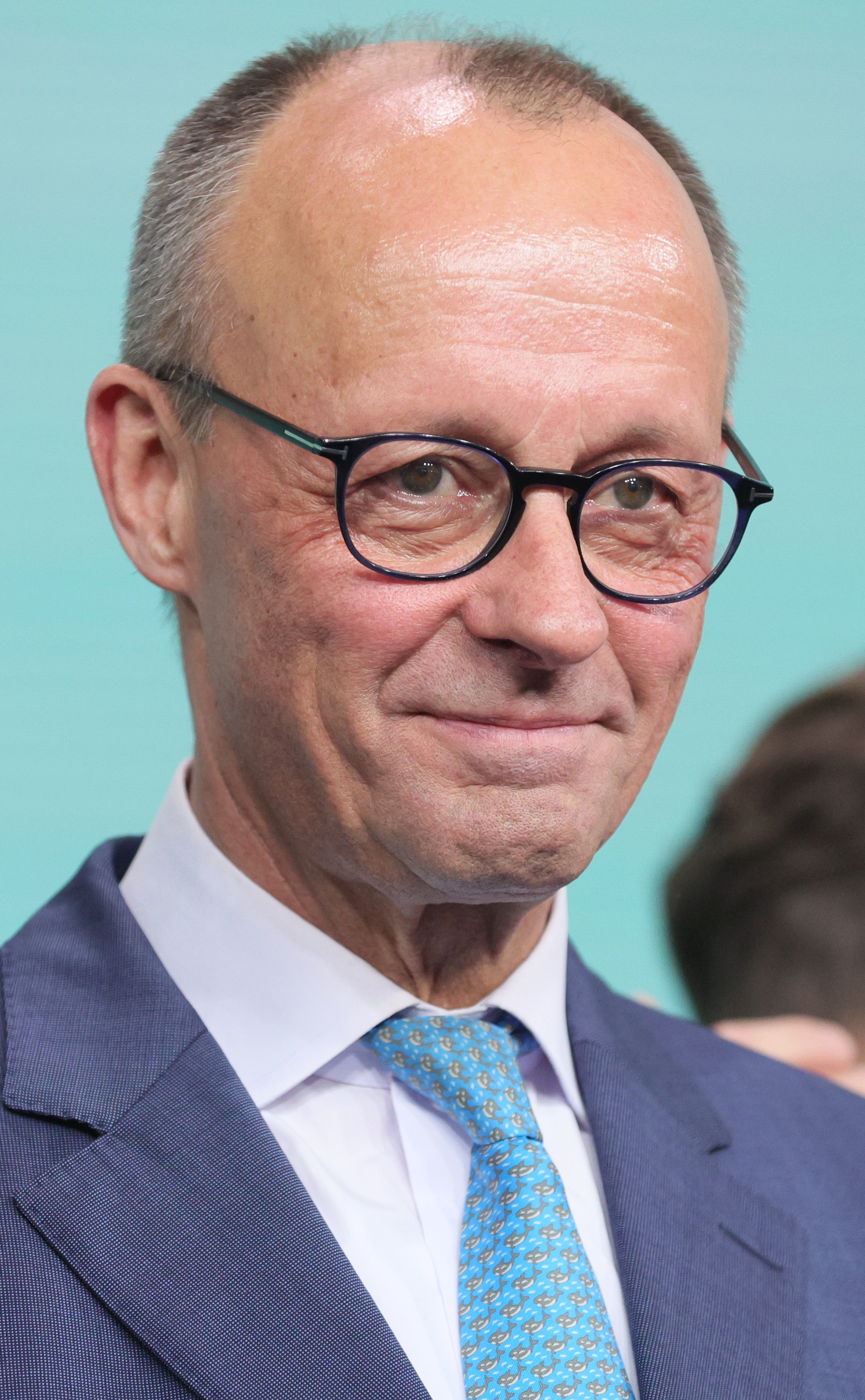
Germany
Friedrich Merz,
Chancellor

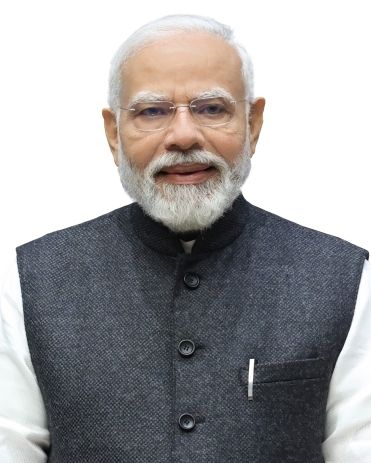
India
Narendra Modi,
Prime Minister

Indonesia
Gibran Rakabuming Raka,
Vice President

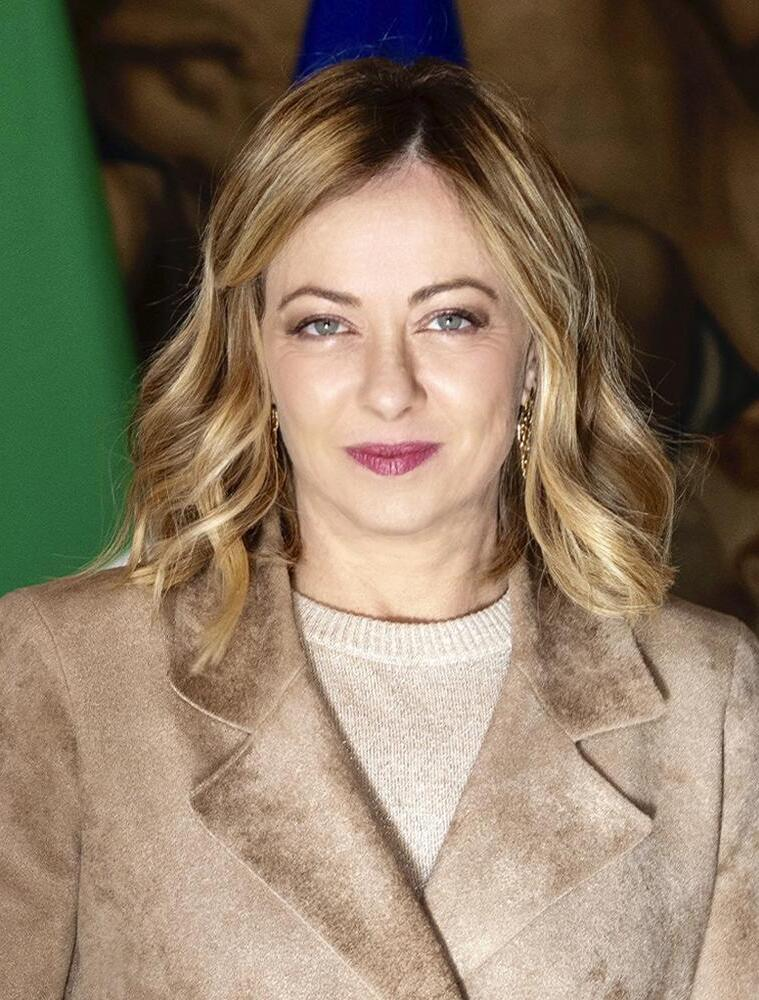
Italy
Giorgia Meloni,
Prime Minister

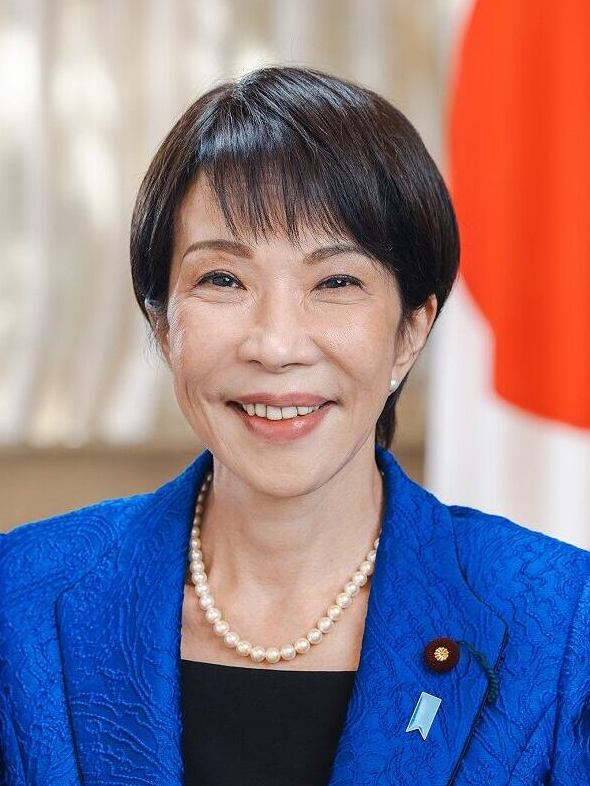
Japan
Sanae Takaichi,
Prime Minister

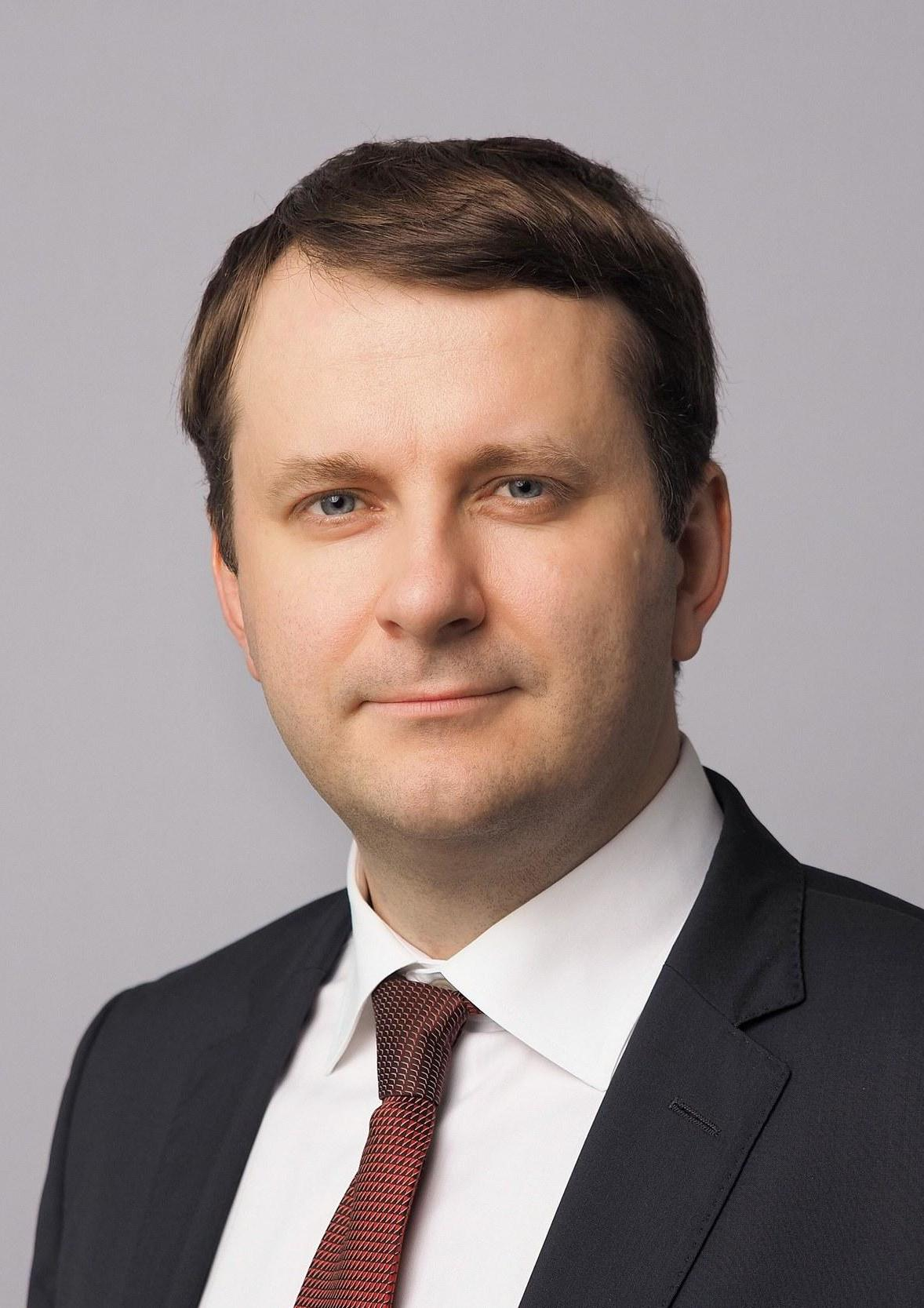
Russia
Maxim Oreshkin,
Deputy Chief of Staff of the Presidential Executive Office

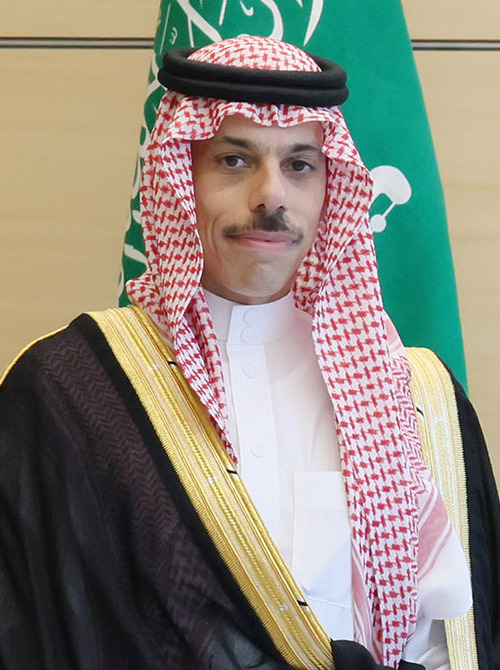
Saudi Arabia
Faisal bin Farhan Al Saud,
Minister of Foreign Affairs

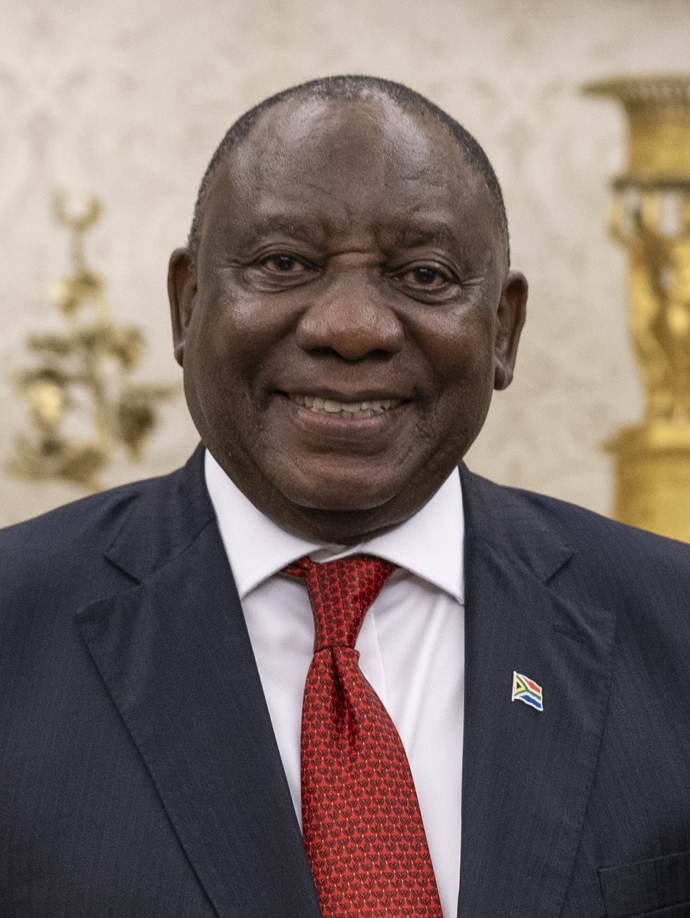
South Africa
Cyril Ramaphosa,
President
(Host)

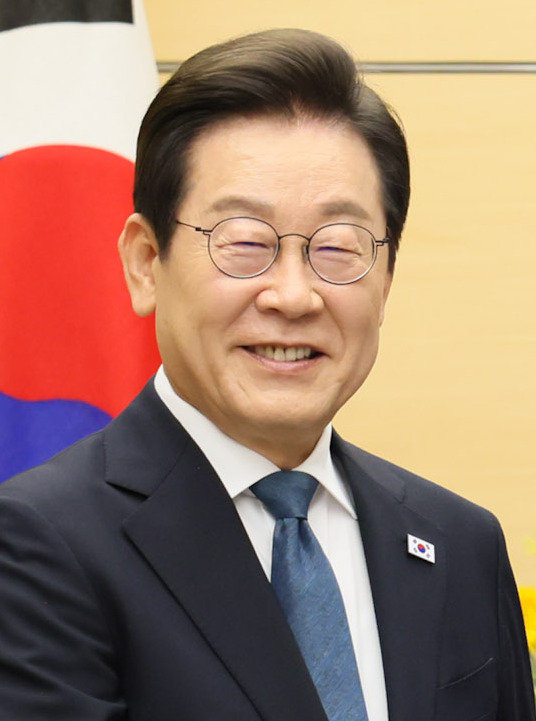
South Korea
Lee Jae Myung,
President

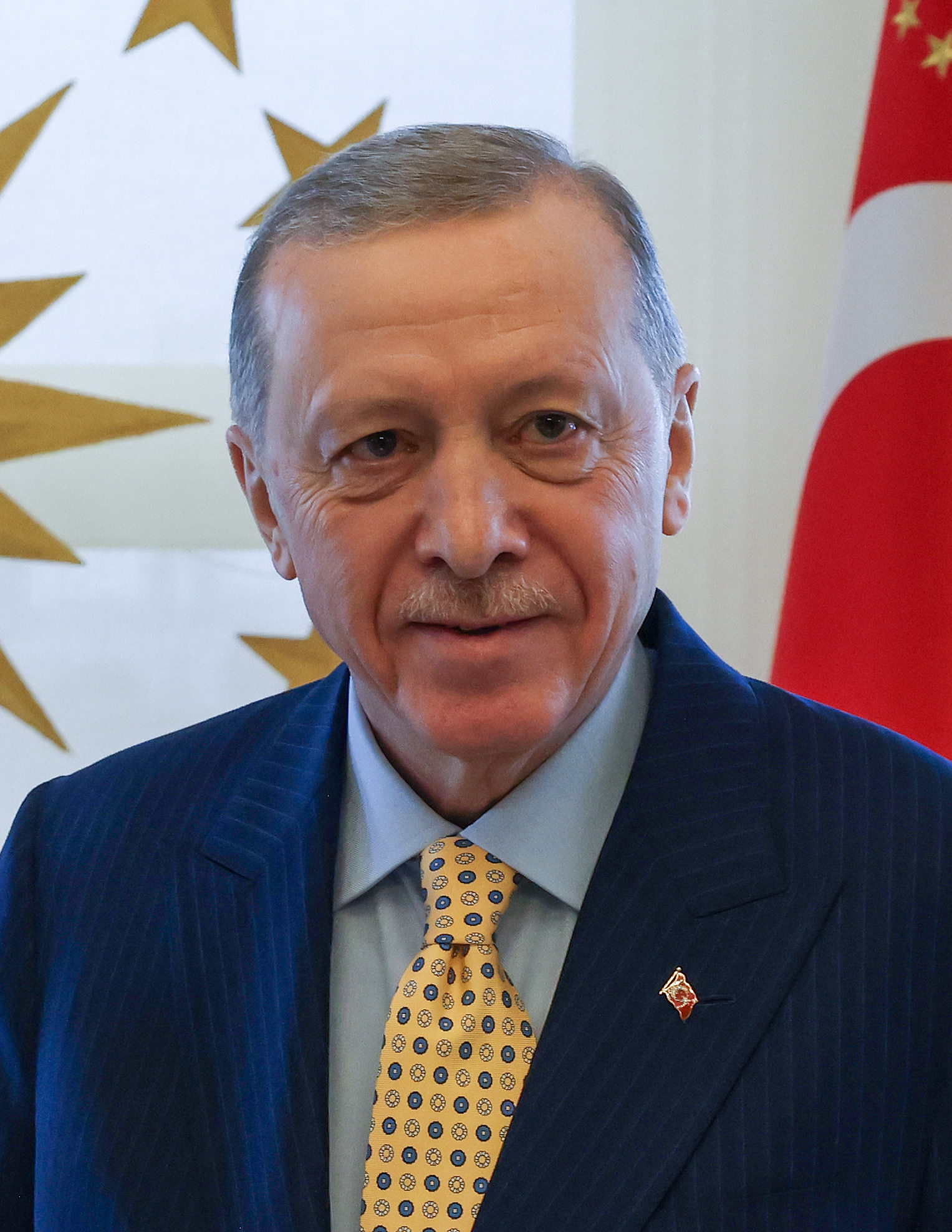
Turkey
Recep Tayyip Erdoğan,
President

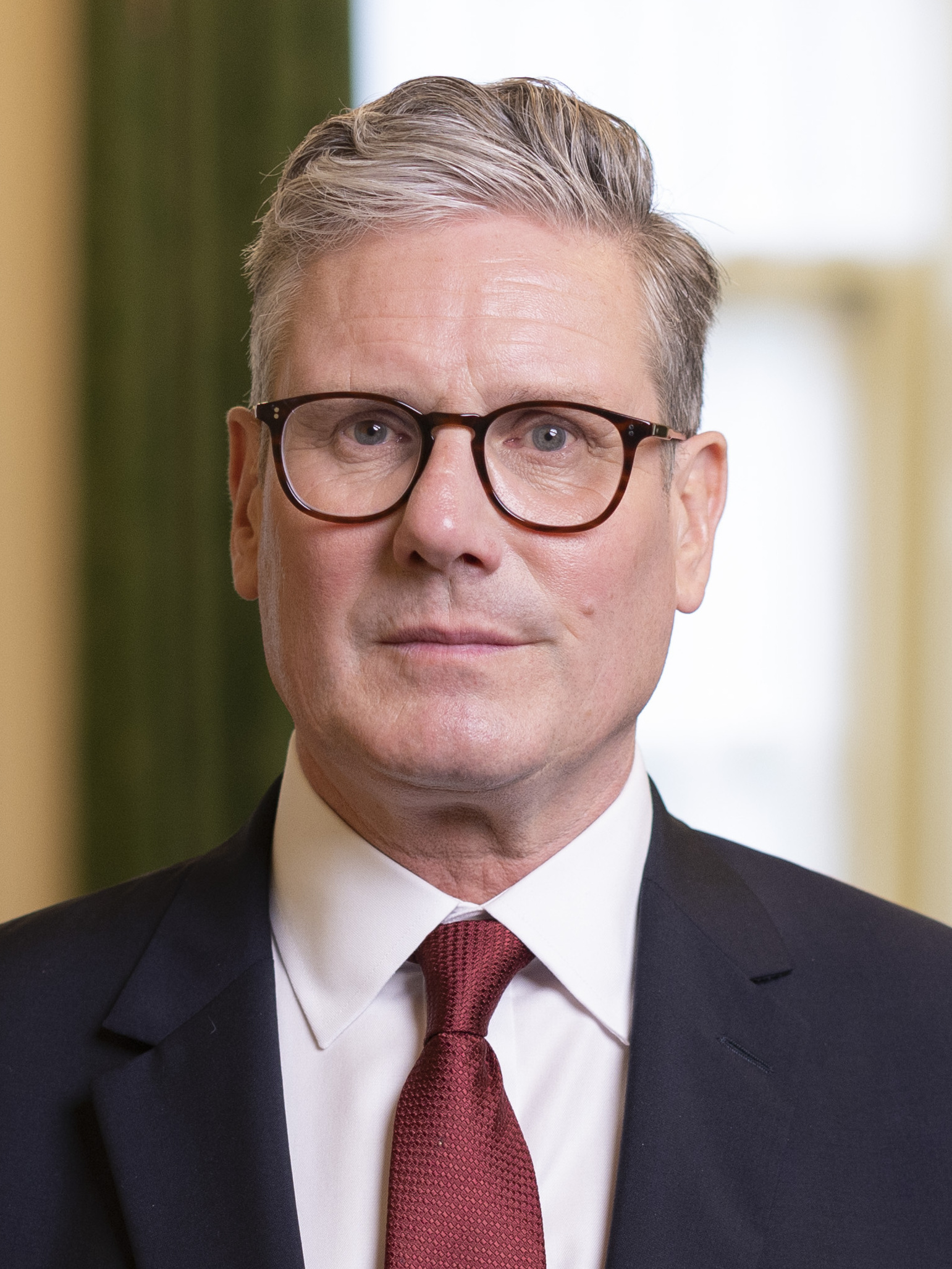
United Kingdom
Keir Starmer,
Prime Minister

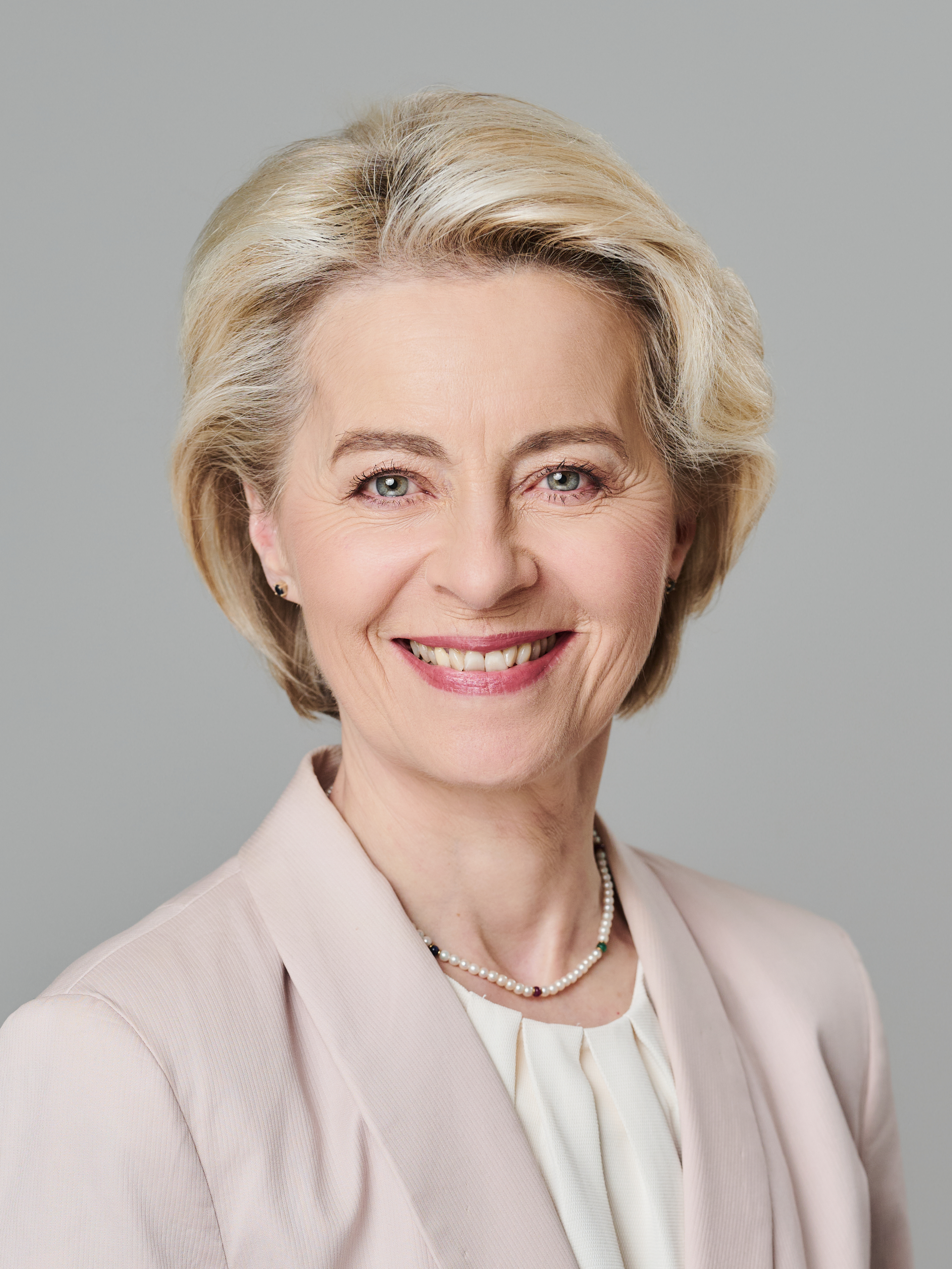
European Union
Ursula von der Leyen,
President of the European Commission

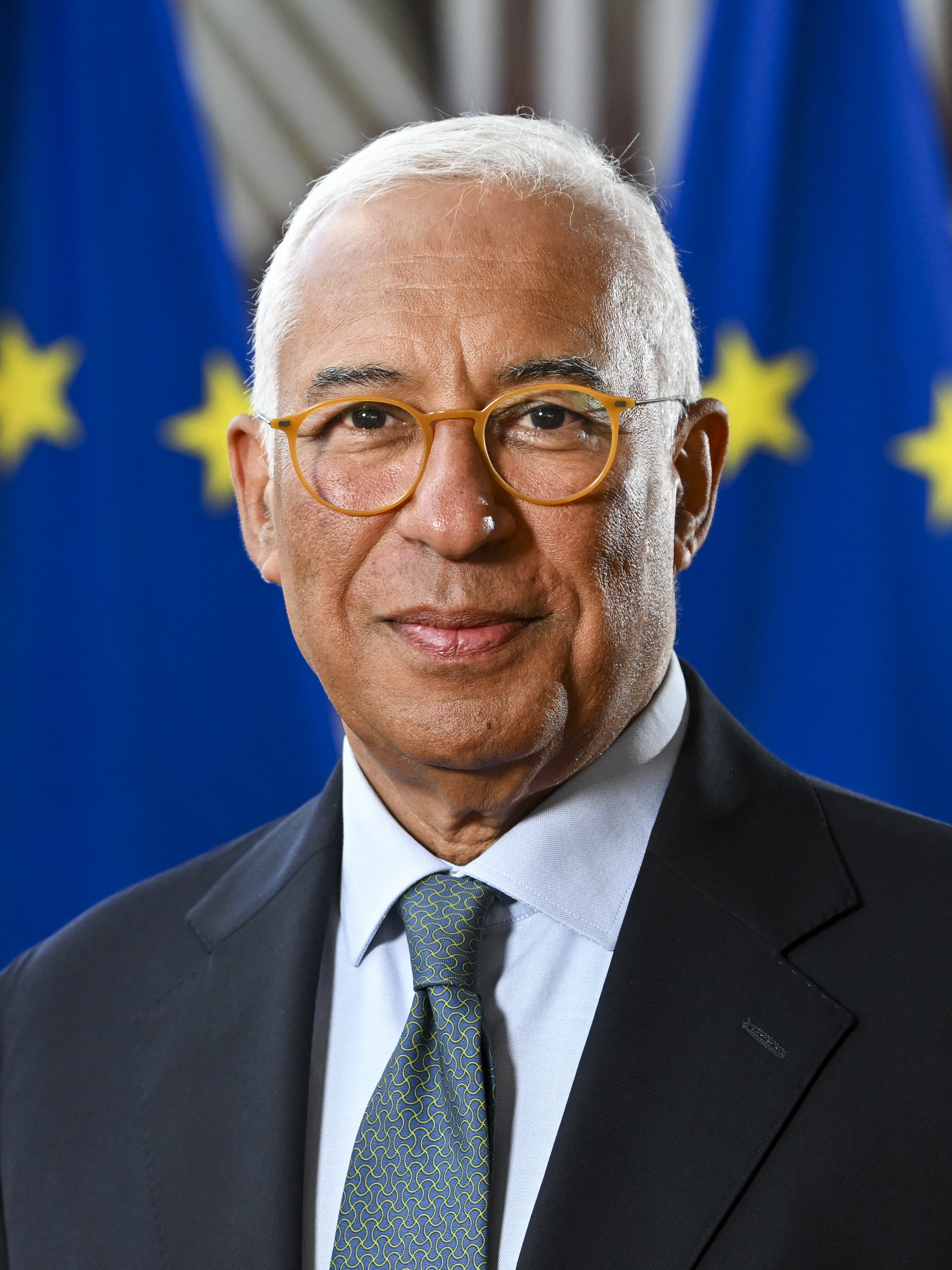
European Union
Antonio Costa,
President of the European Council

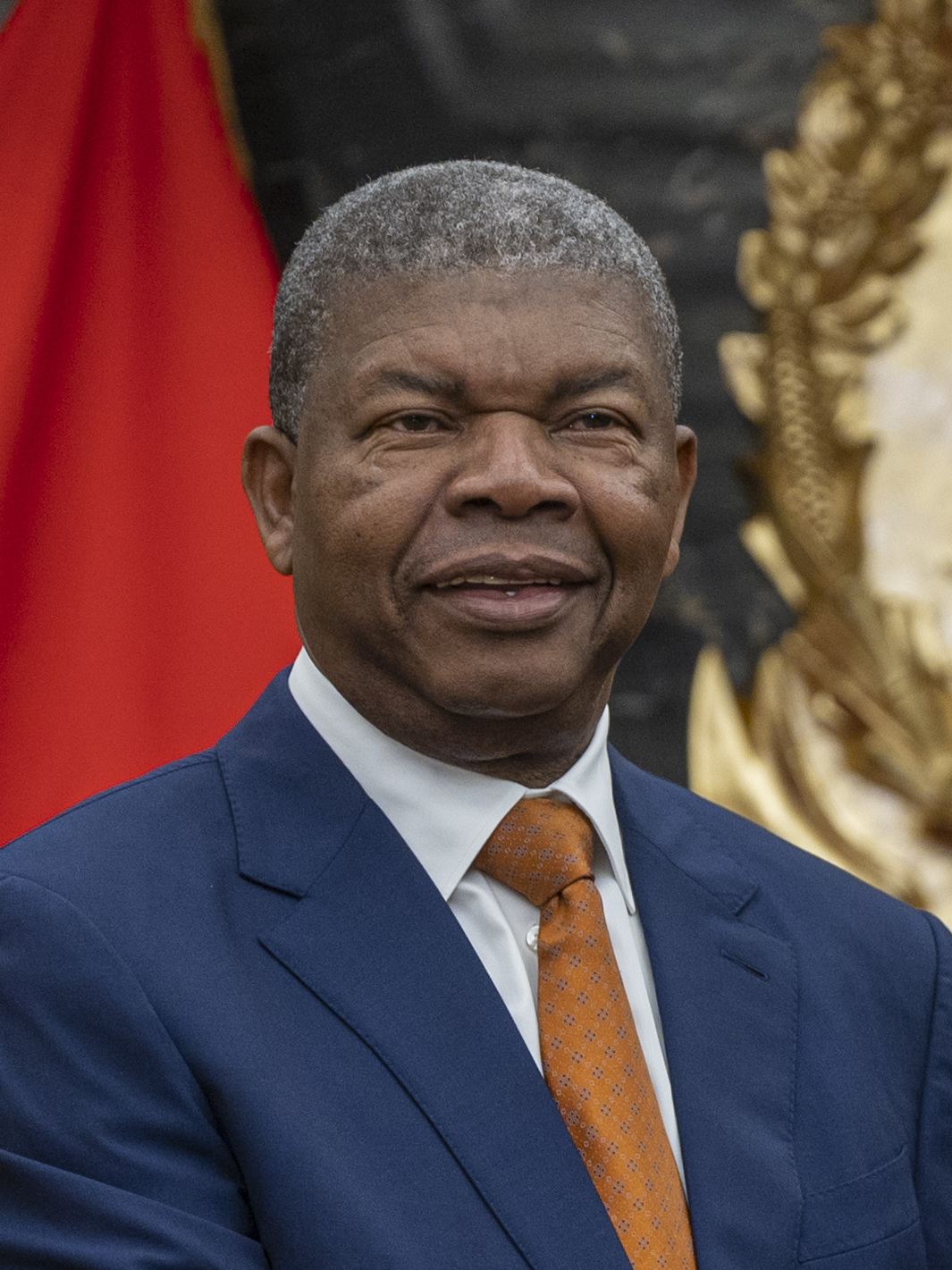
African Union
Angola
João Lourenço,
Chairperson and President

=== Notable non-participation ===
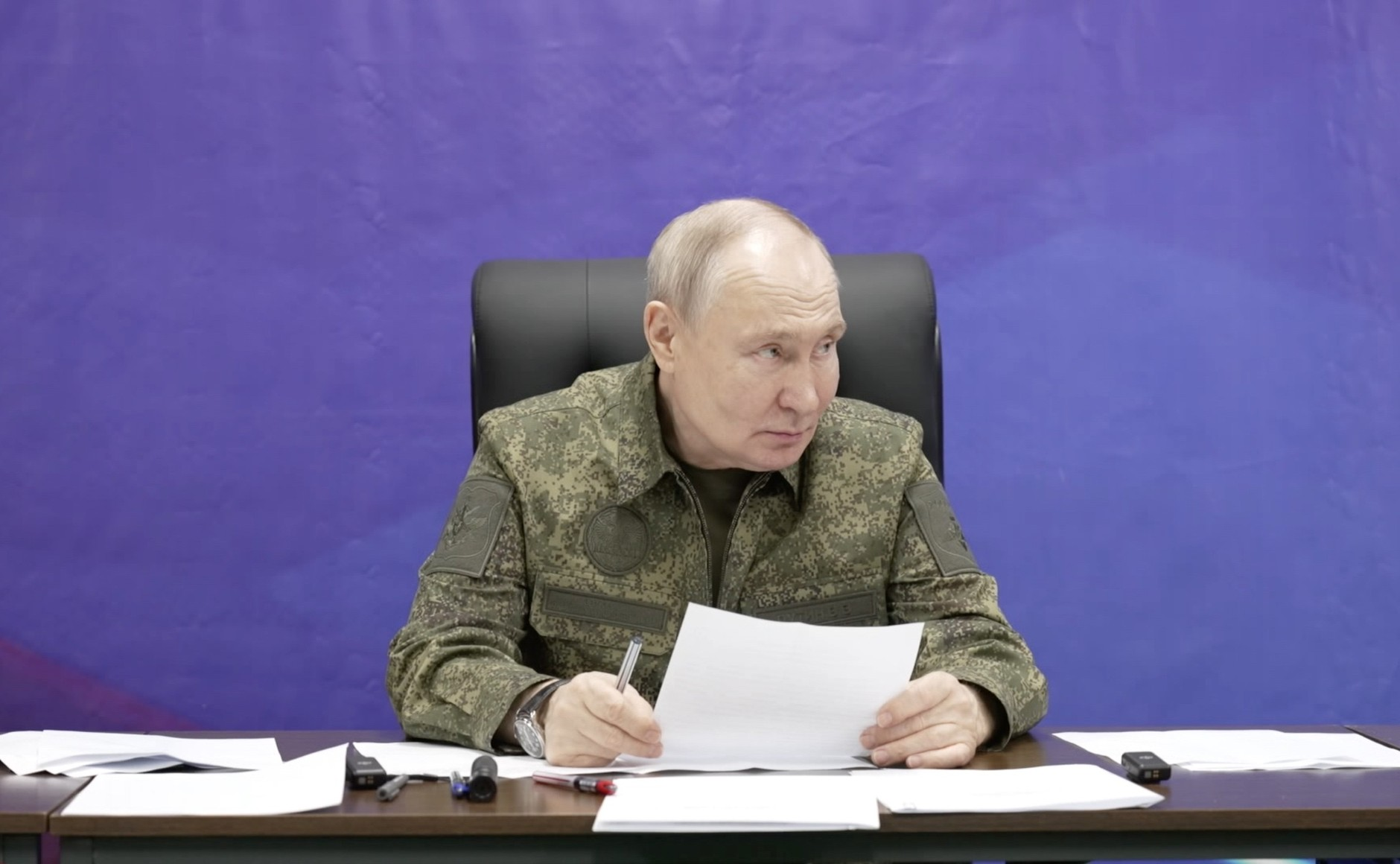
South Africa is legally obliged to arrest Russian President Vladimir Putin if he enters the country

US President Donald Trump was boycotting the event and not sending any representative, citing claims of violence against and killings of Afrikaners in South Africa and labelling the hosting of the summit there "a total disgrace". In support of Trump, Argentina's President Javier Milei also joined the boycott, designating Foreign Minister Pablo Quirno as his substitute.

Chinese leader Xi Jinping also did not go to South Africa, with Chinese Premier Li Qiang attending instead. Mexican President Claudia Sheinbaum also did not attend, while Russian President Vladimir Putin could not travel to South Africa due to the outstanding arrest warrant issued against him by the International Criminal Court (ICC). South Africa is legally obliged to arrest Putin if he enters the country, as it is a signatory to the Rome Statute of the ICC.

In a later development, Indonesian President Prabowo Subianto also decided not to attend the summit in South Africa and instead sent Vice President Gibran Rakabuming Raka to represent Indonesia. Saudi Crown Prince Mohammed bin Salman Al Saud likewise withdrew from participation, assigning Foreign minister Faisal bin Farhan Al Saud to lead his delegation instead.

These absences left the summit with neither of the two largest global economies represented by their top leaders, and seven of the G20's nineteen member countries not sending their heads of state or government. French President Emmanuel Macron warned that the absence of approximately one-third of full leadership participation posed a serious risk to the future relevance and effectiveness of the G20 as a global governance forum.

Canadian Prime Minister Mark Carney declared: "the world can move on without the United States." Despite President Trump's administration boycotting the meeting, Carney argued that the consensus reached at the G20 retained legitimacy. He emphasized that countries representing three-quarters of the world's population, two-thirds of global GDP, and three-quarters of world trade participated—even without the U.S. present.

The following leaders were invited to the summit:

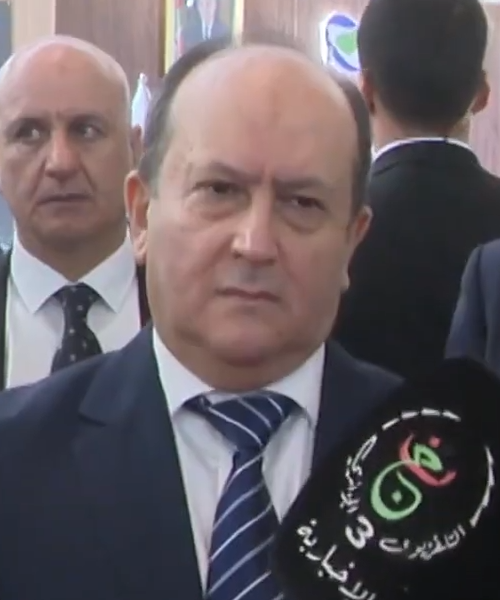
Algeria
Sifi Ghrieb,
Prime Minister

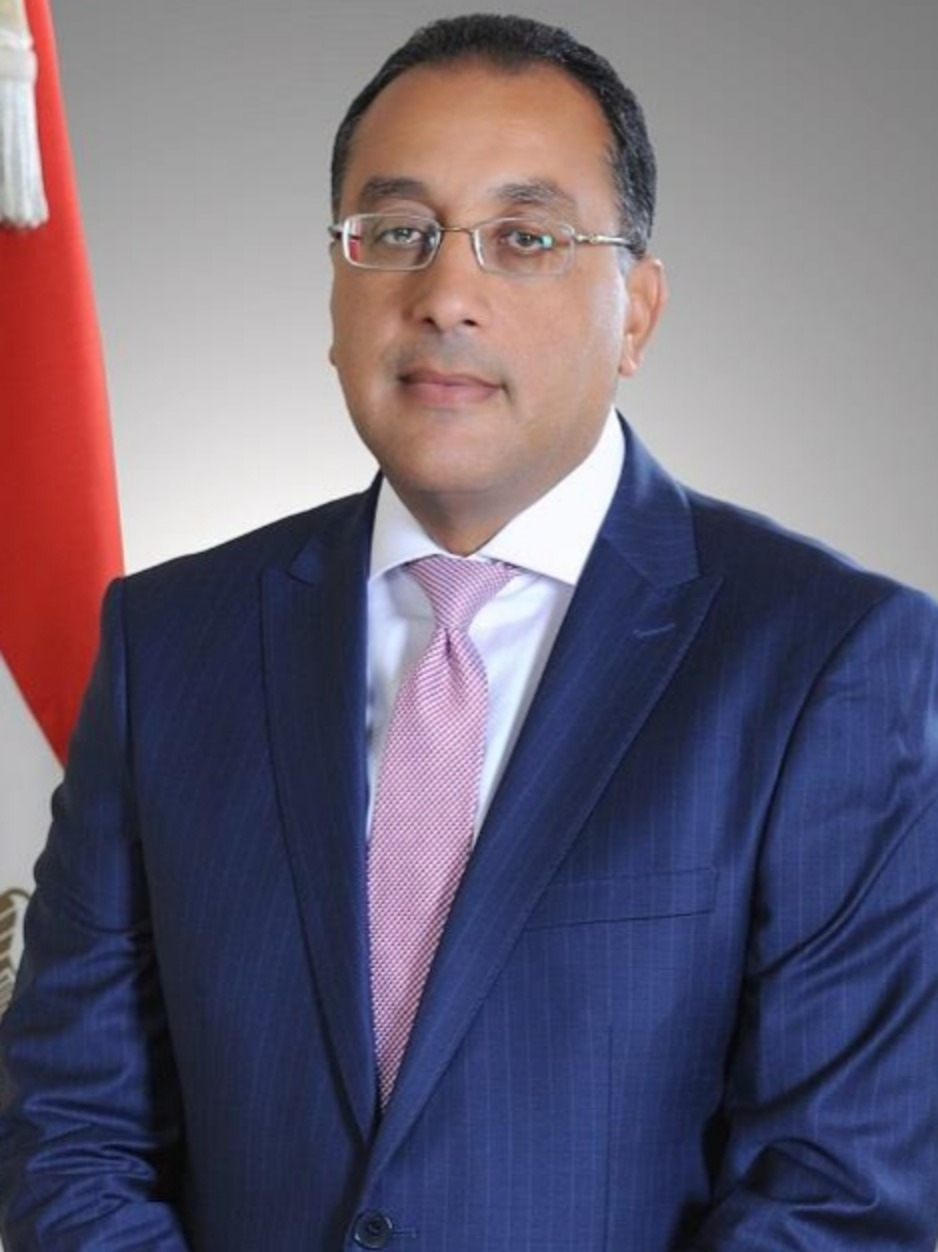
Egypt
Mostafa Madbouly,
Prime Minister
2025 chairperson of the New Partnership for Africa's Development

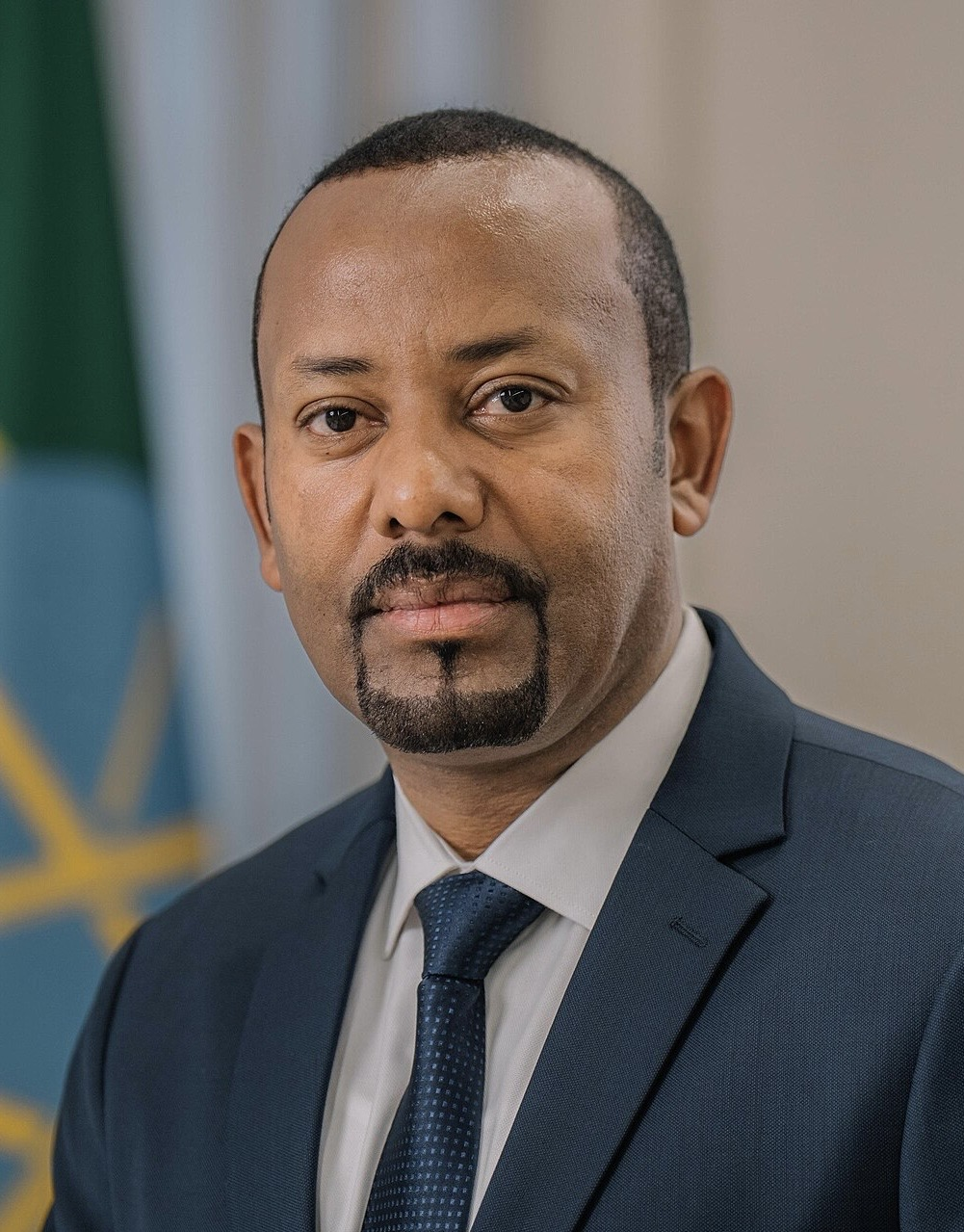
Ethiopia
Abiy Ahmed,
Prime Minister

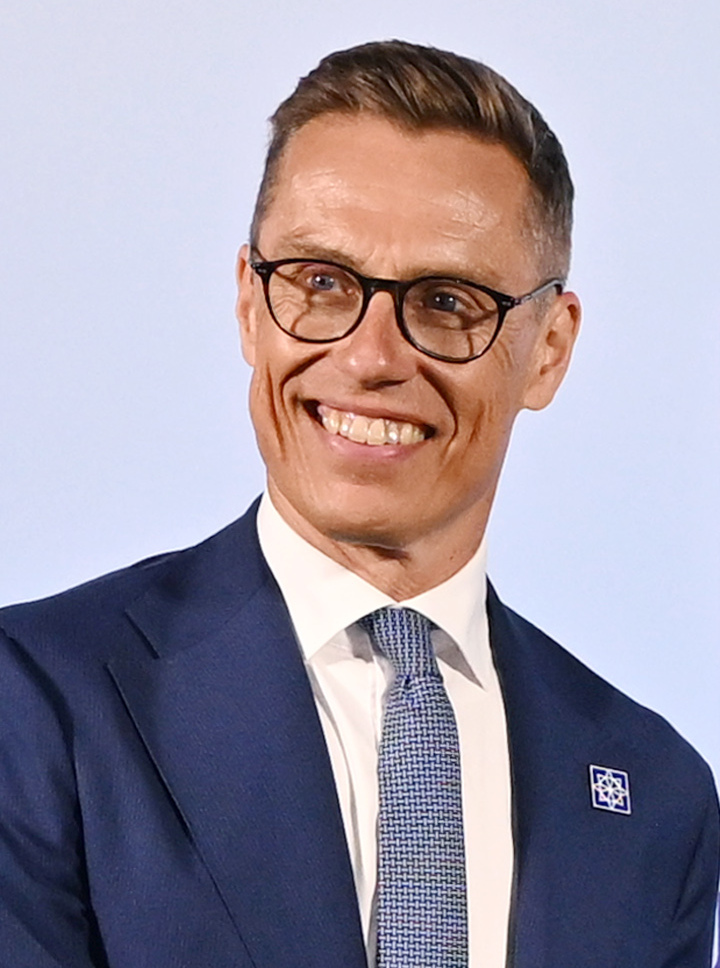
Finland
Alexander Stubb,
President

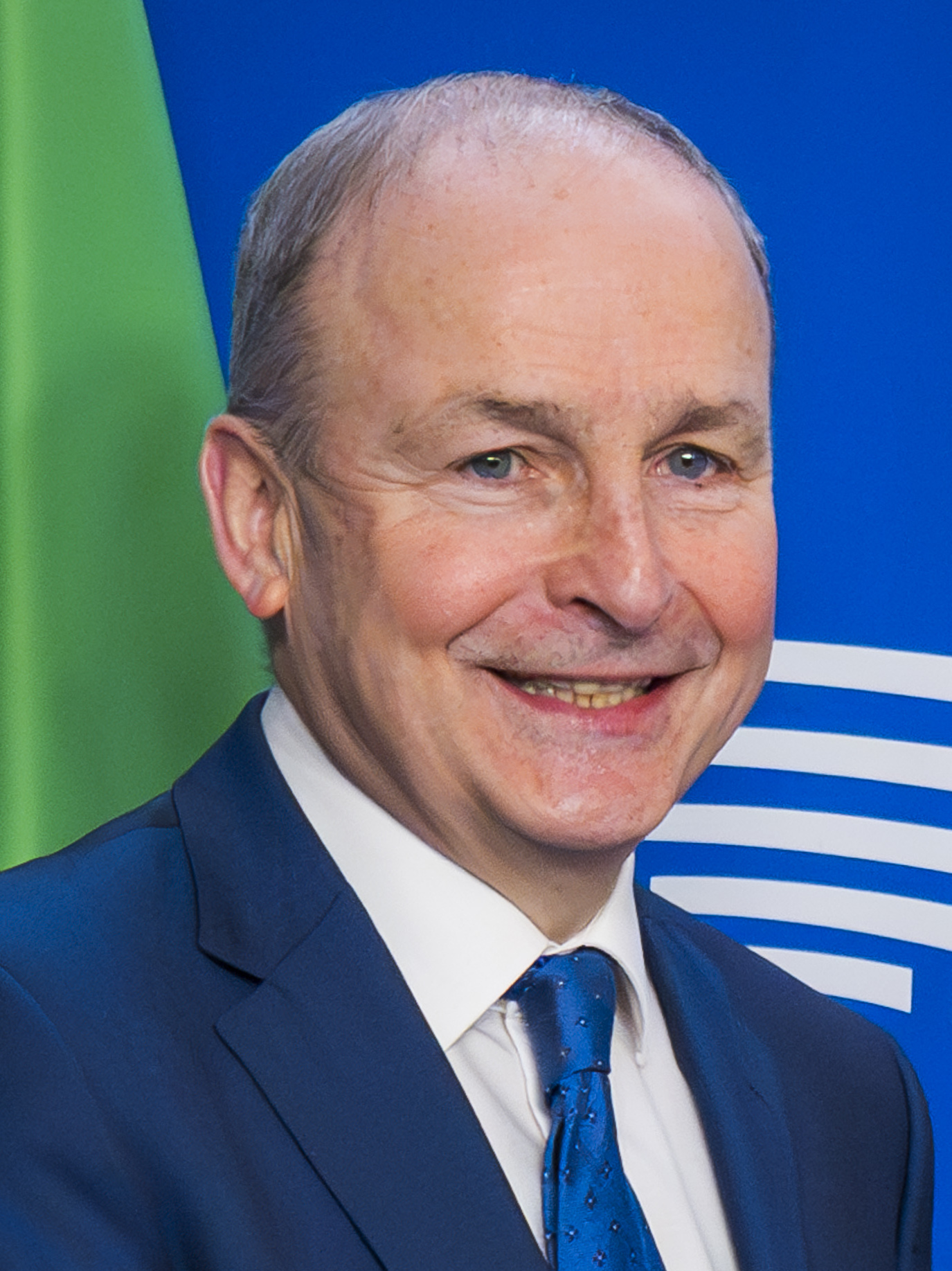
Ireland
Micheál Martin,
Taoiseach

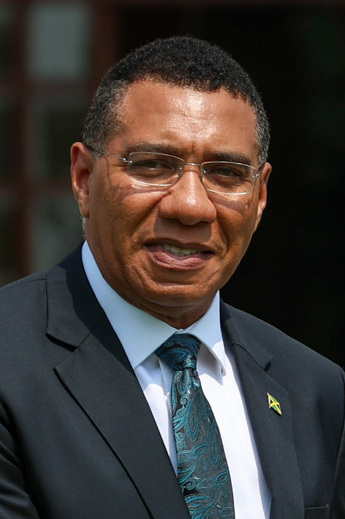
Jamaica
Andrew Holness,
Prime Minister

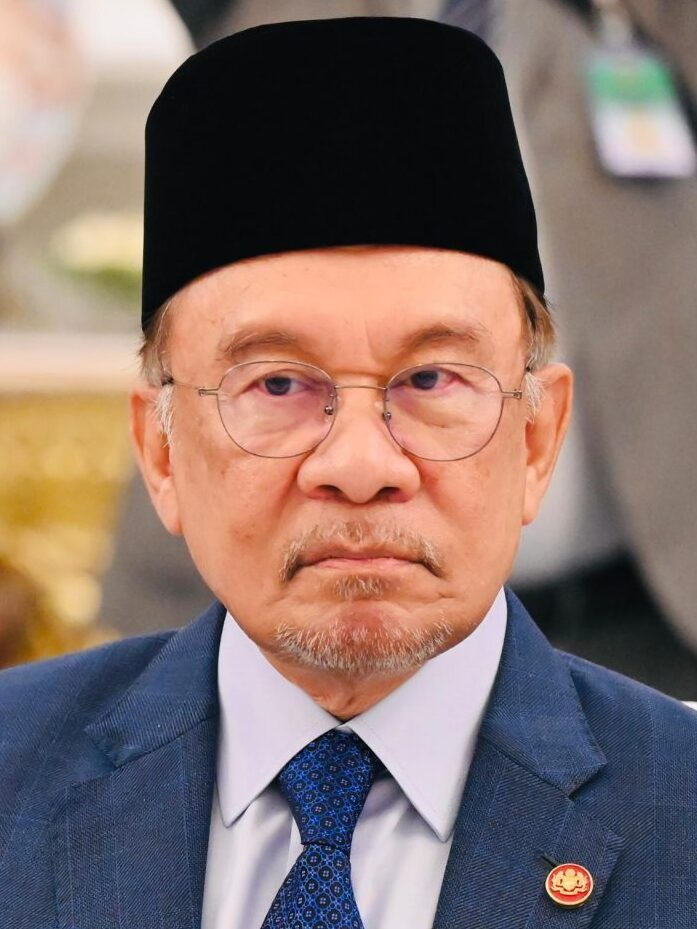
Malaysia
Anwar Ibrahim,
Prime Minister
2025 Chairperson of the Association of Southeast Asian Nations

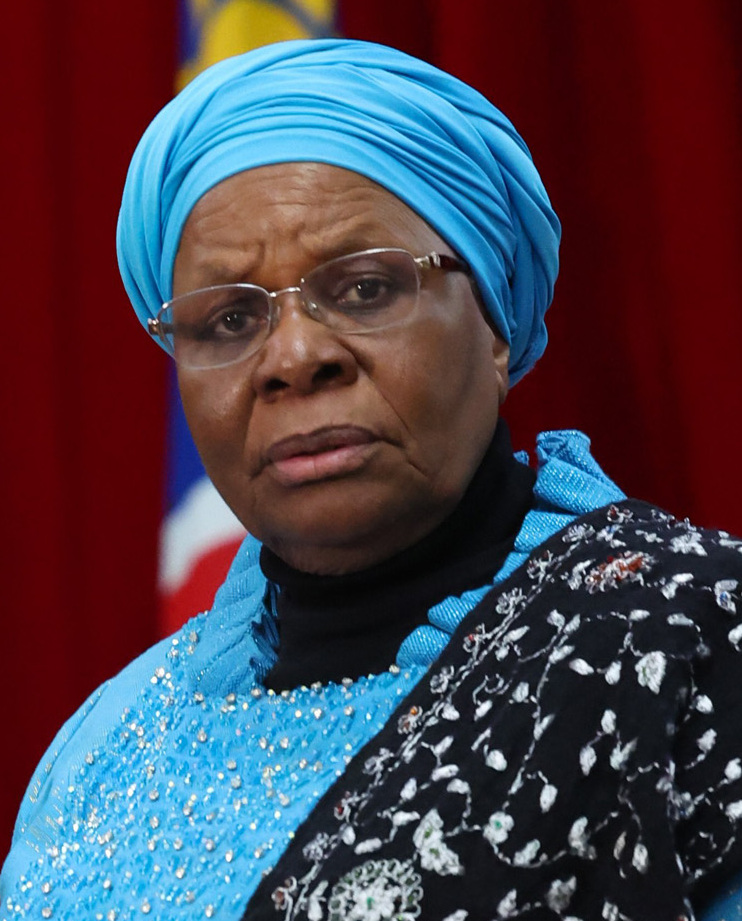
Namibia
Netumbo Nandi-Ndaitwah,
President

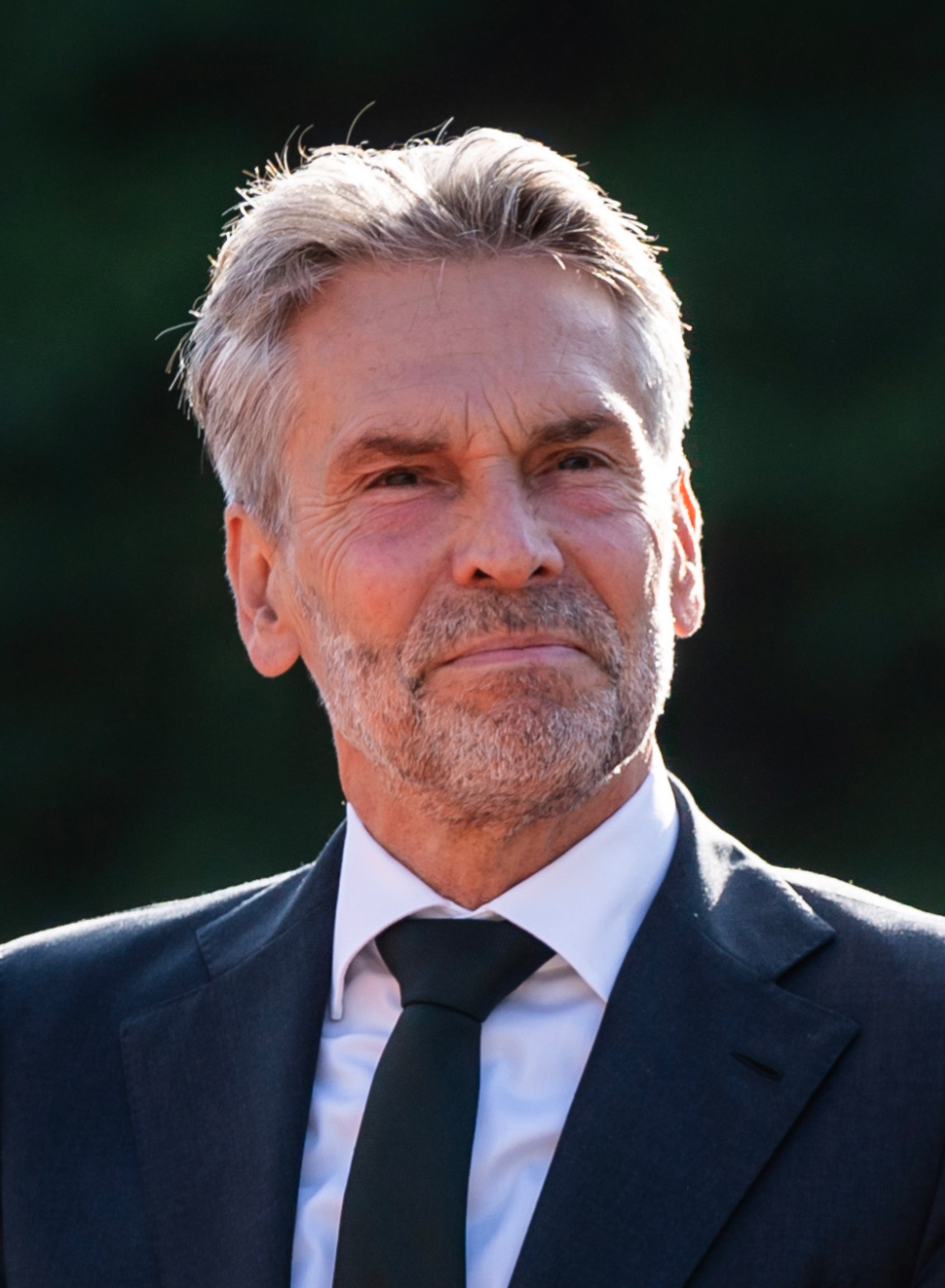
Netherlands
Dick Schoof,
Prime Minister

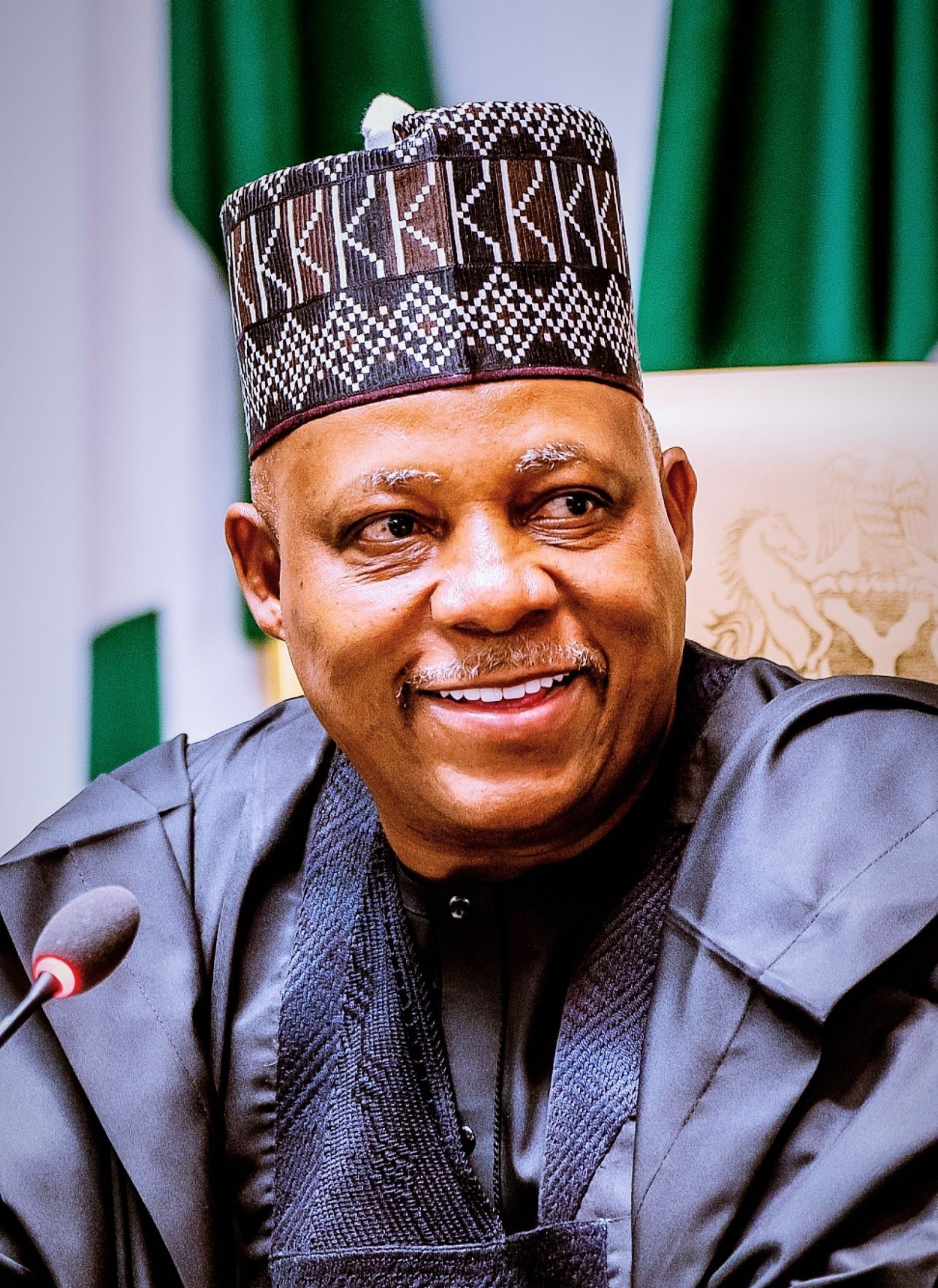
Nigeria
Kashim Shettima,
Vice President

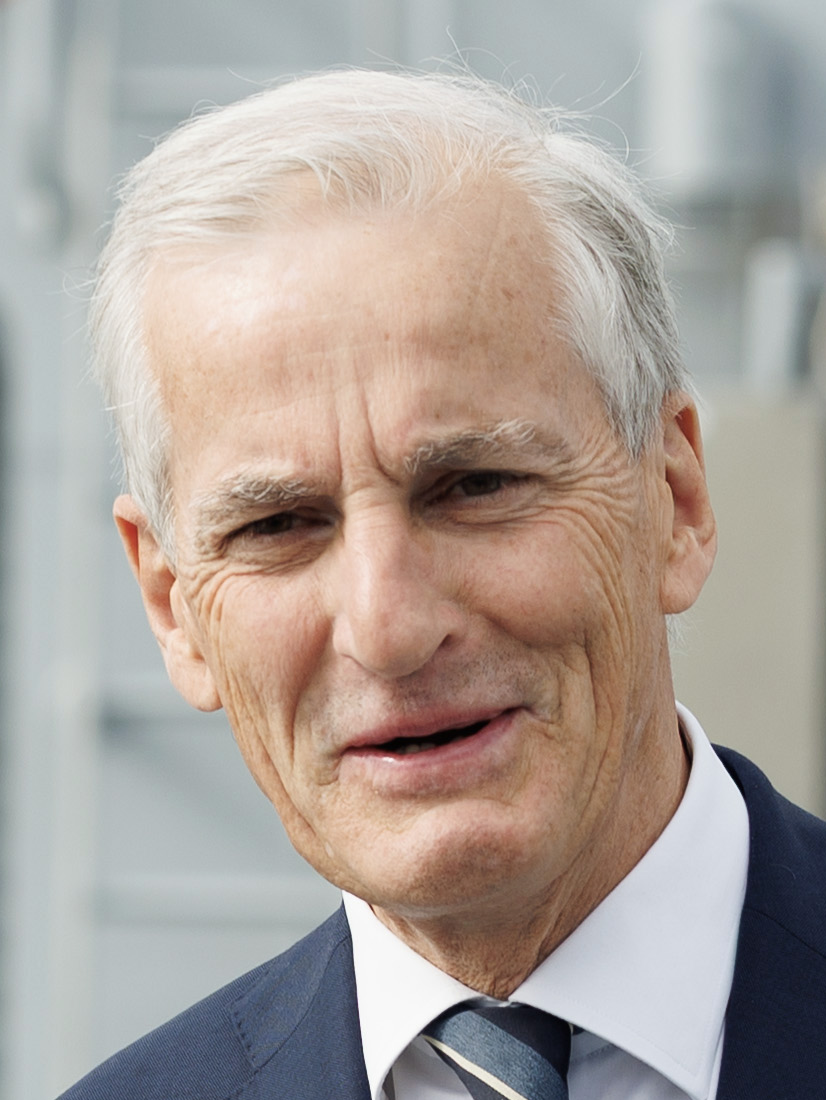
Norway
Jonas Gahr Støre,
Prime Minister

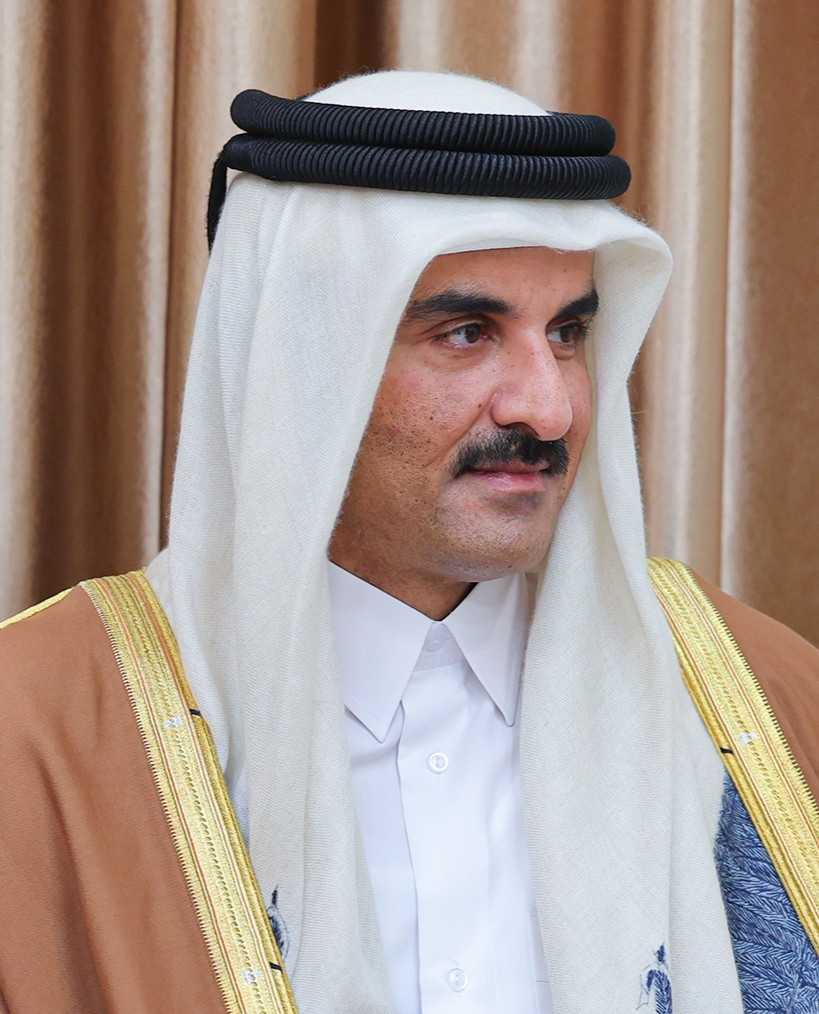
Qatar
Tamim bin Hamad Al Thani,
Emir

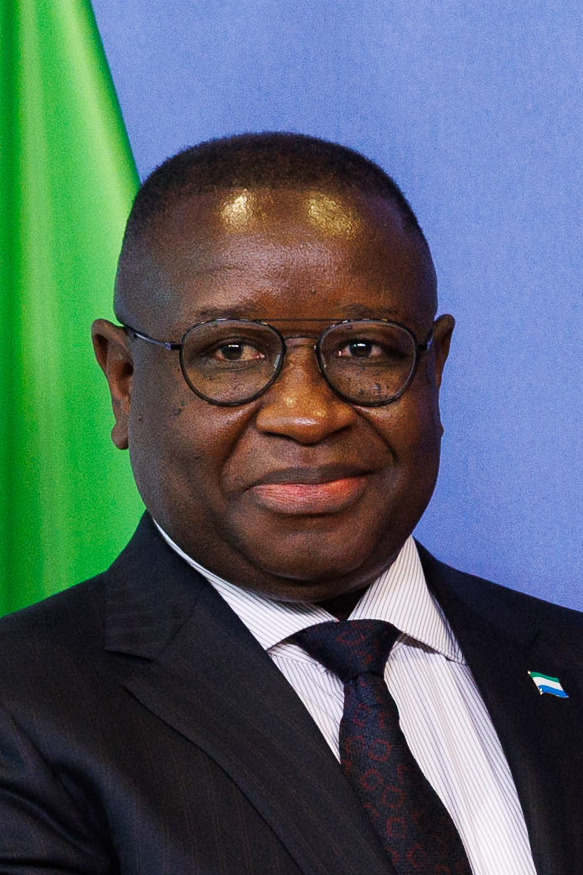
Sierra Leone
Julius Maada Bio,
President
Chairman of Economic Community of West African States

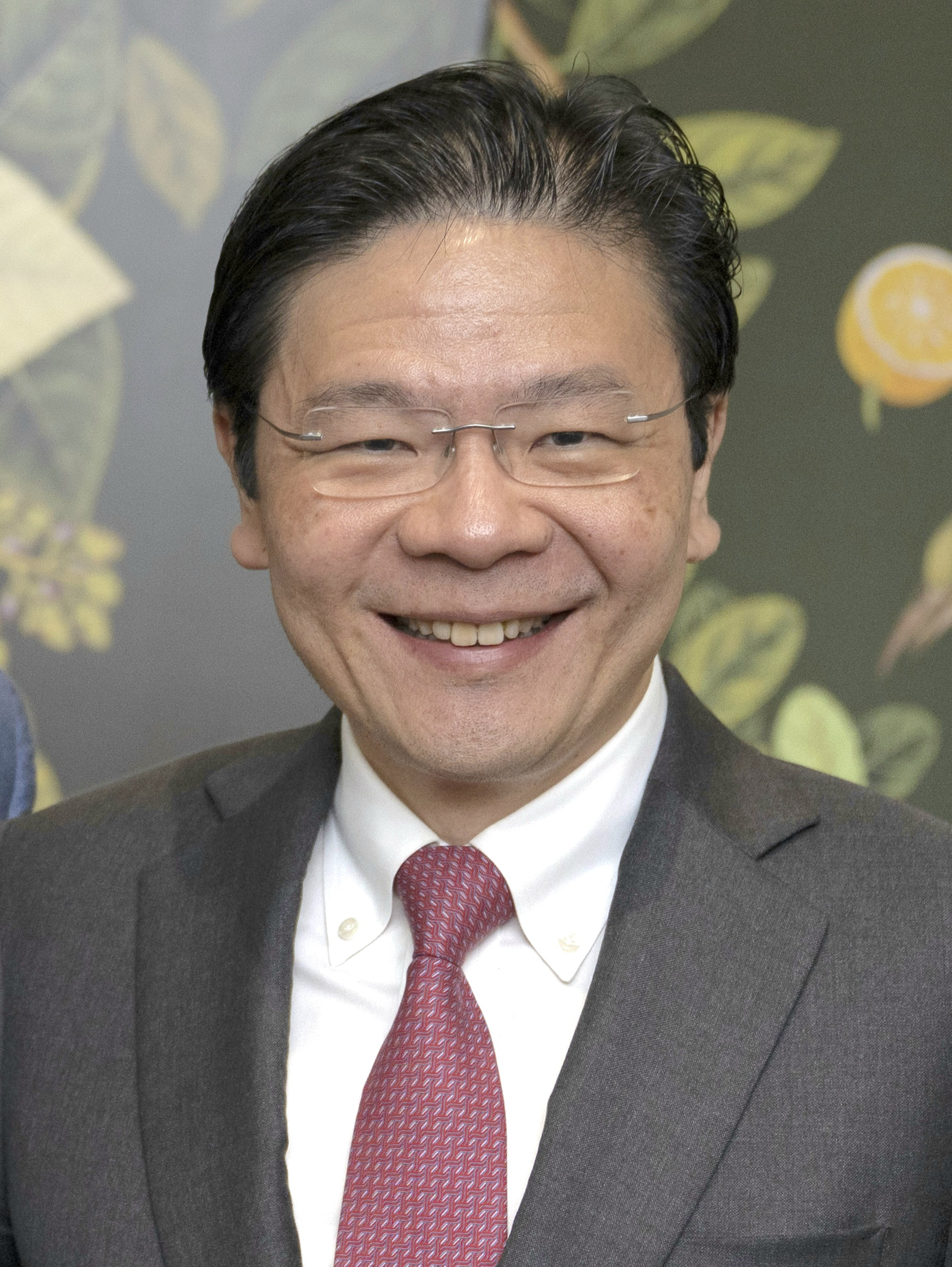
Singapore
Lawrence Wong,
Prime Minister

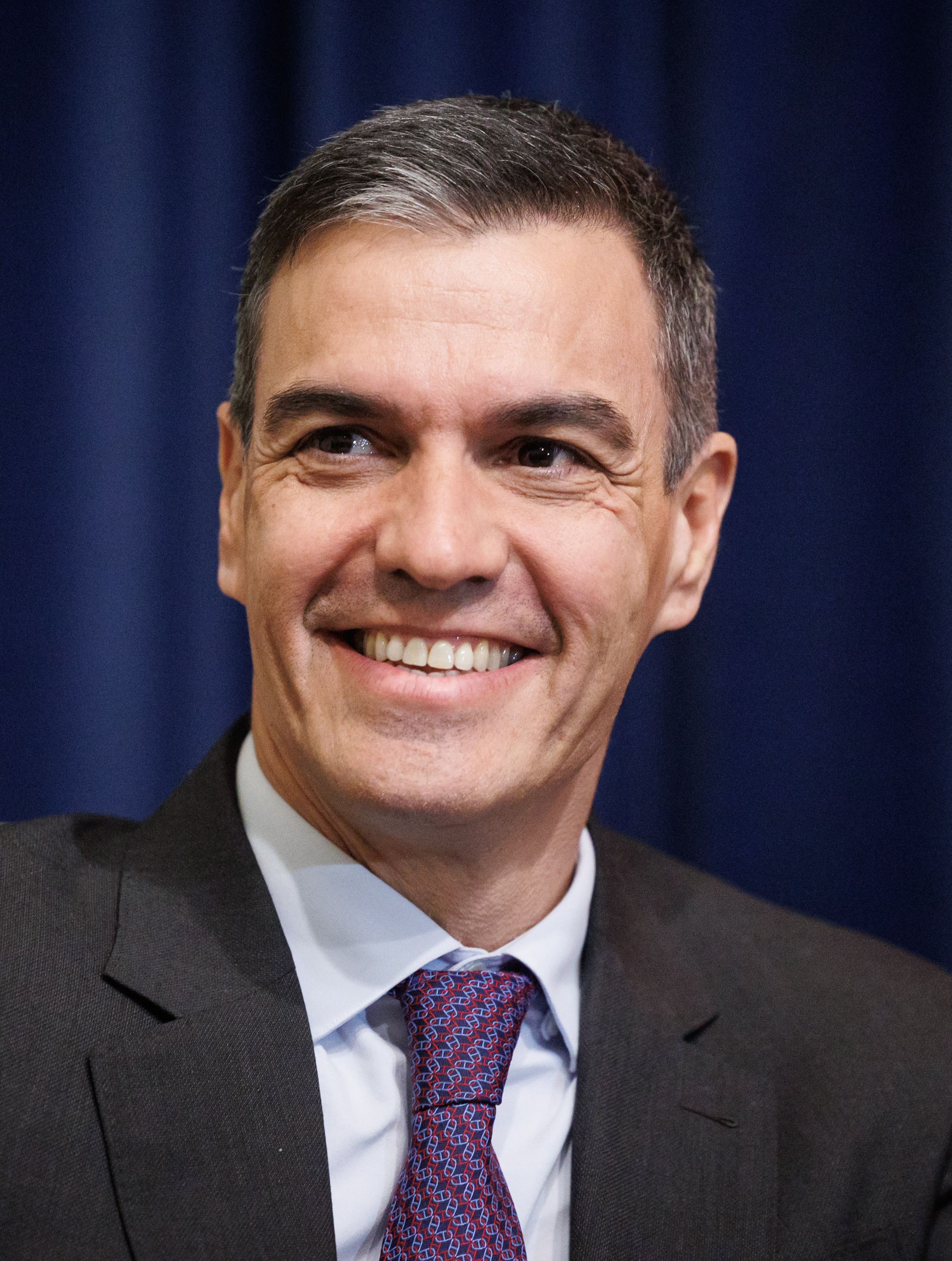
Spain
Pedro Sánchez,
Prime Minister

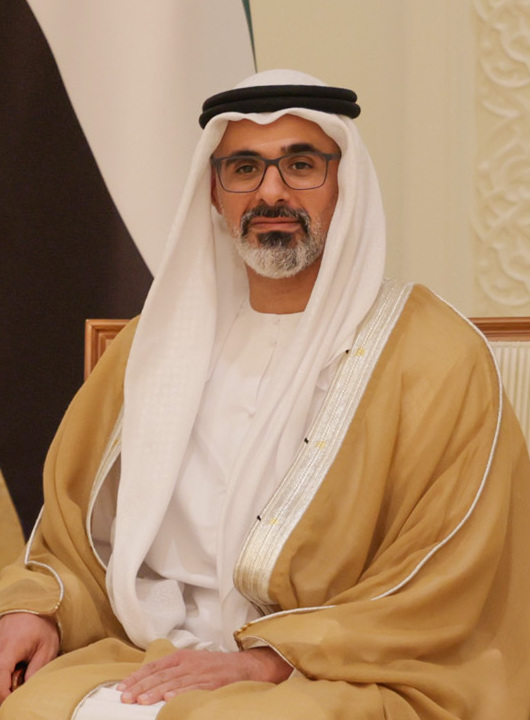
United Arab Emirates
Khaled bin Mohamed Al Nahyan,
Crown Prince of Abu Dhabi

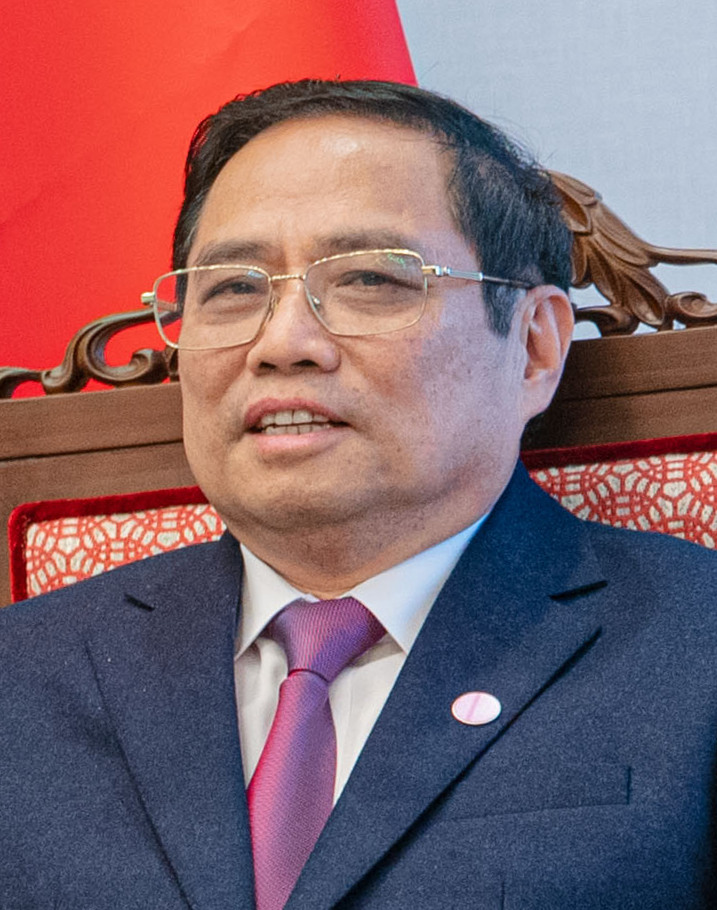
Vietnam
Phạm Minh Chính,
Prime Minister

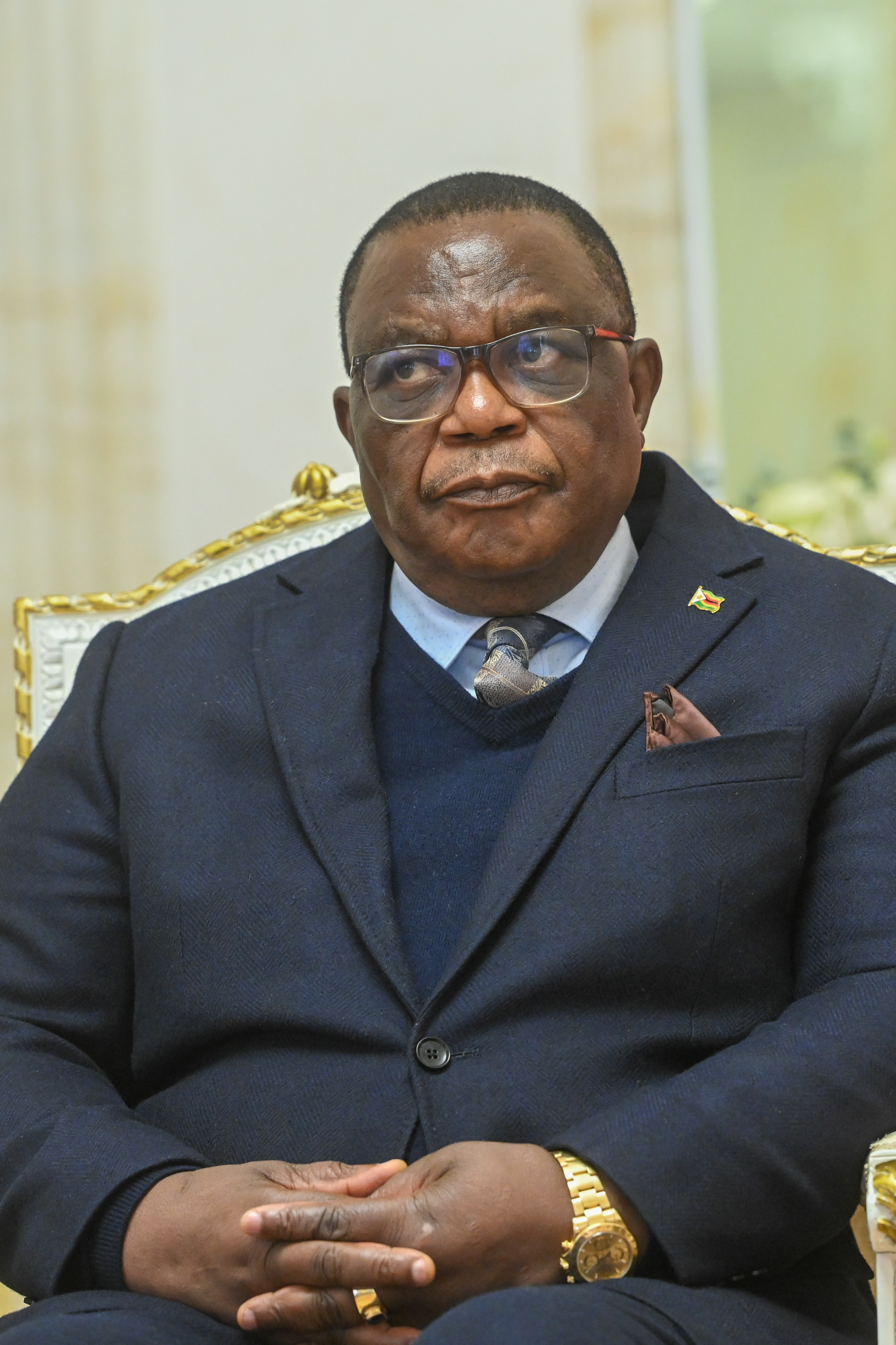
Zimbabwe
Constantino Chiwenga,
Vice-President

== Participating international organisation guests ==
The following organisation leaders were invited to the summit:

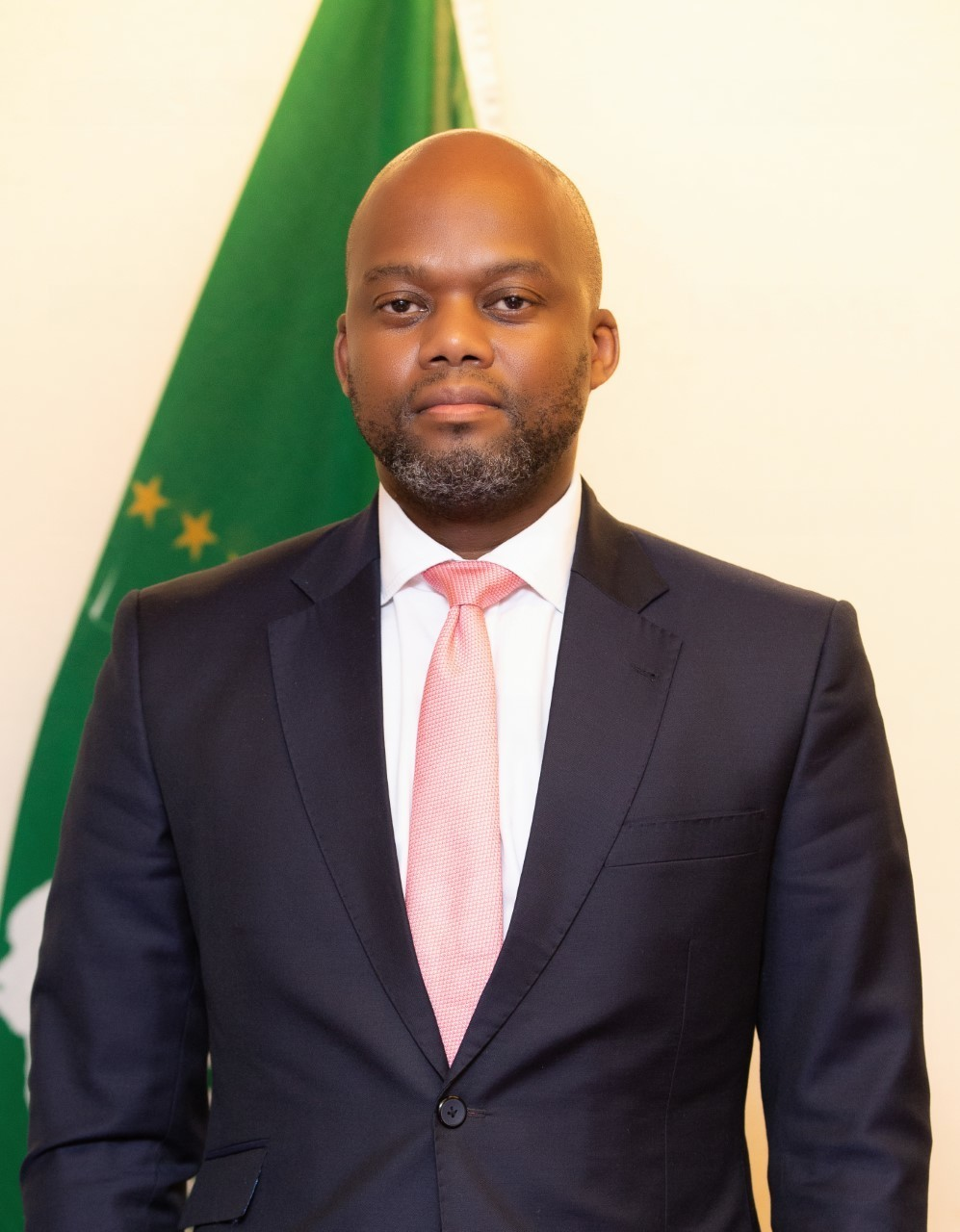
African Continental Free Trade Area
Wamkele Mene,
Secretary-General

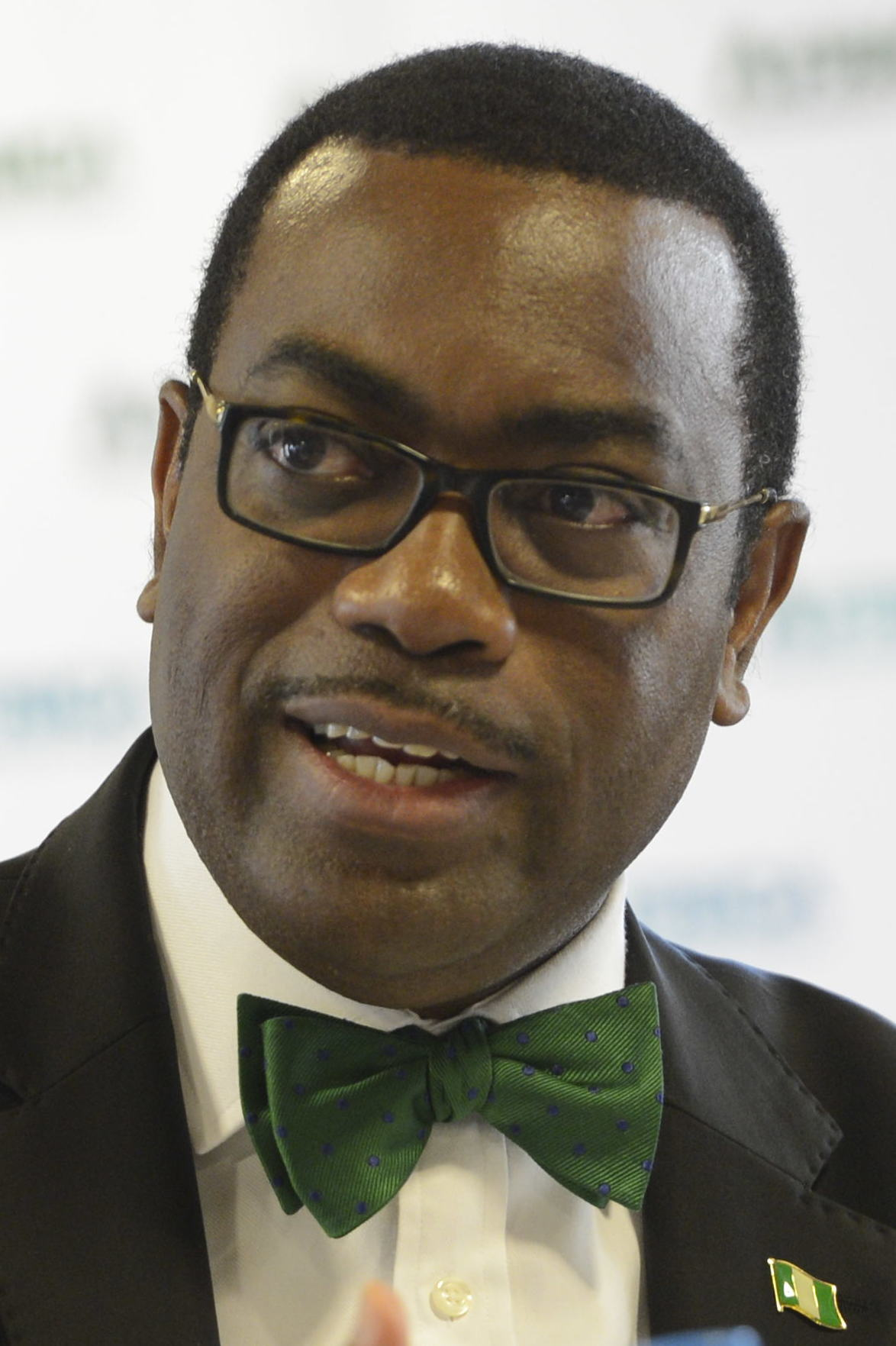
African Development Bank
Akinwumi Adesina,
President

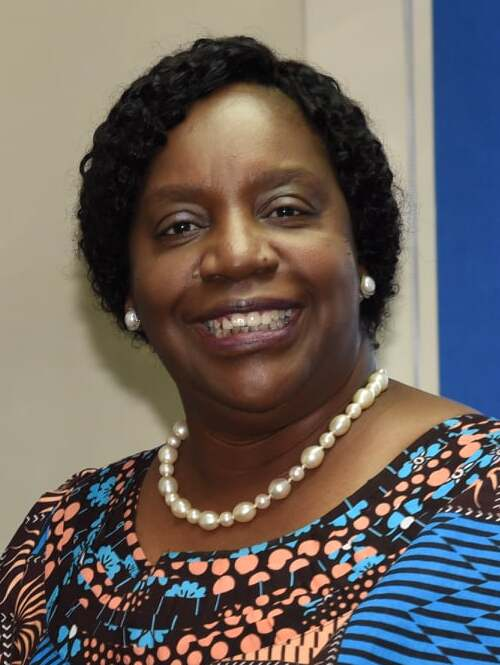
Common Market for Eastern and Southern Africa
Chileshe Kapwepwe,
Secretary General

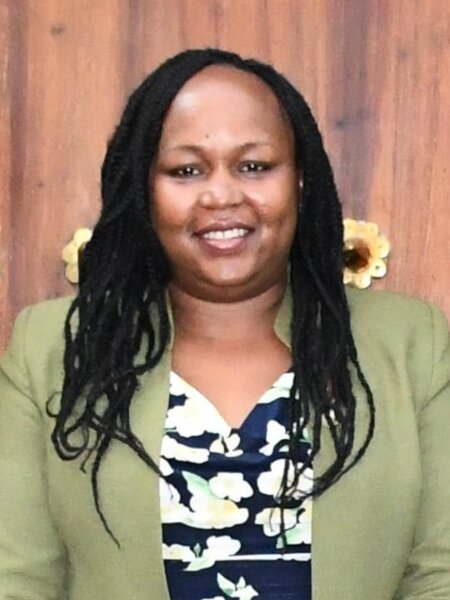
East African Community
Veronica Nduva,
Secretary General

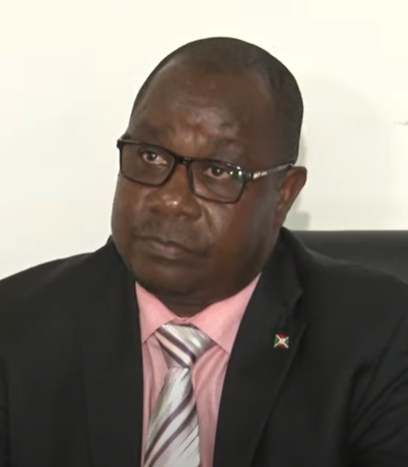
Economic Community of Central African States
Ezéchiel Nibigira,
Commission President

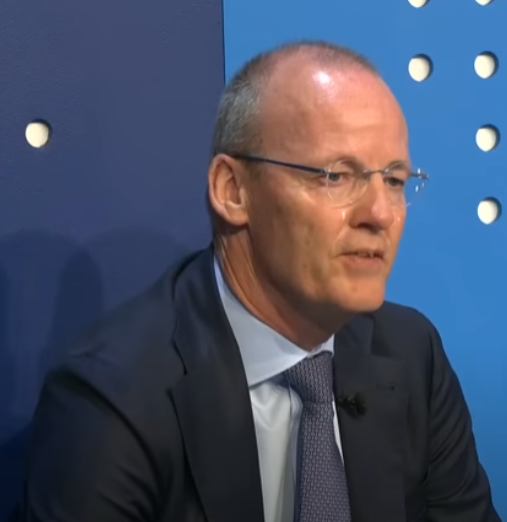
Financial Stability Board
Klaas Knot,
Chair

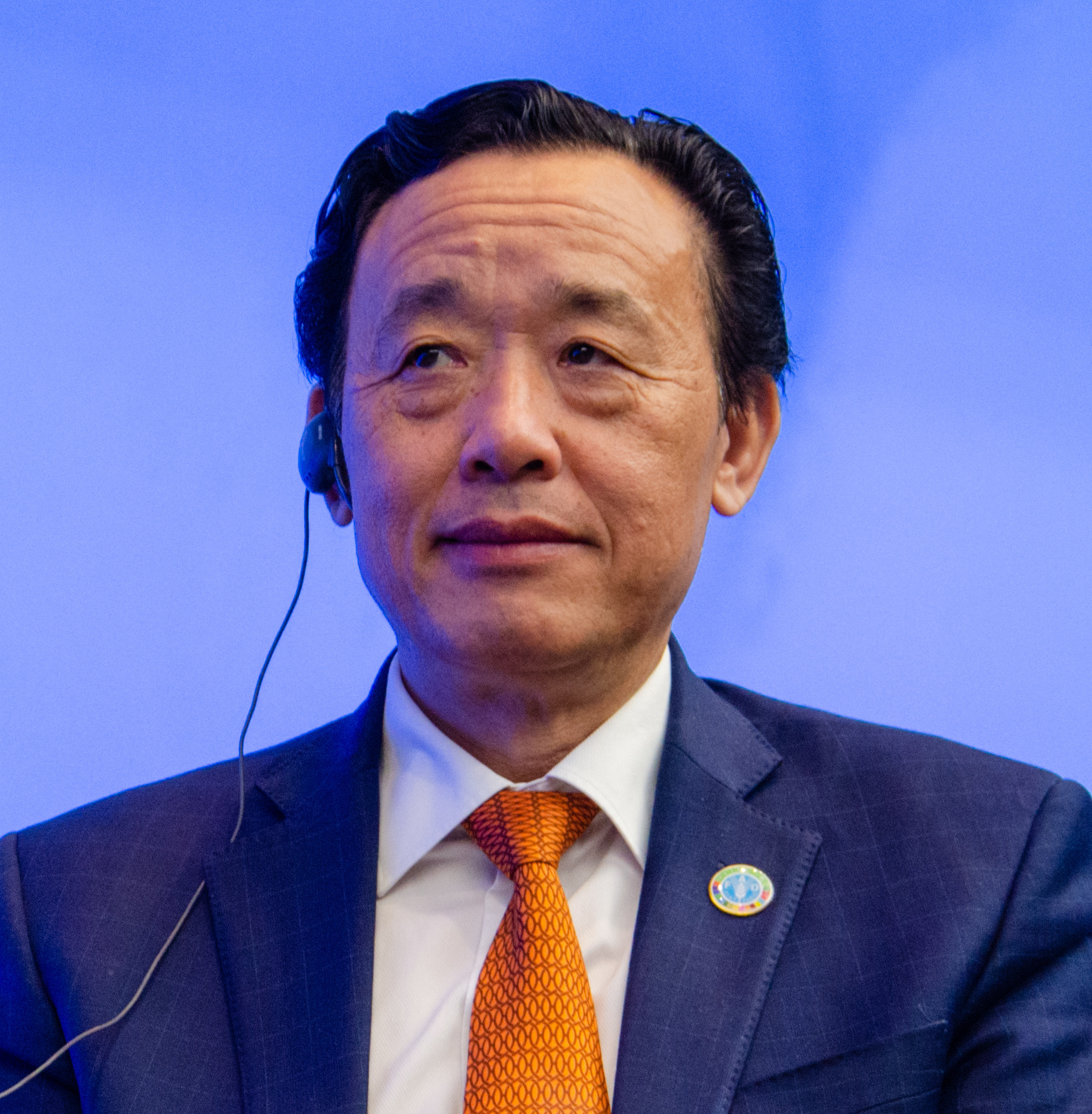
Food and Agriculture Organization of the United Nations
Qu Dongyu,
Director-General

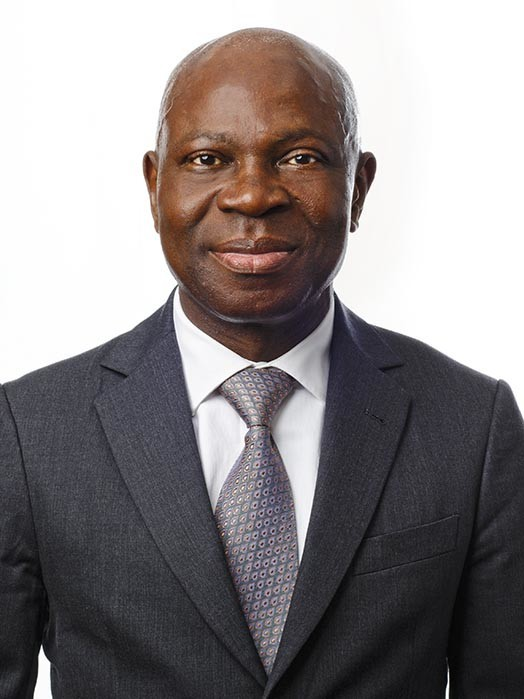
International Labour Organization
Gilbert Houngbo,
Director-General

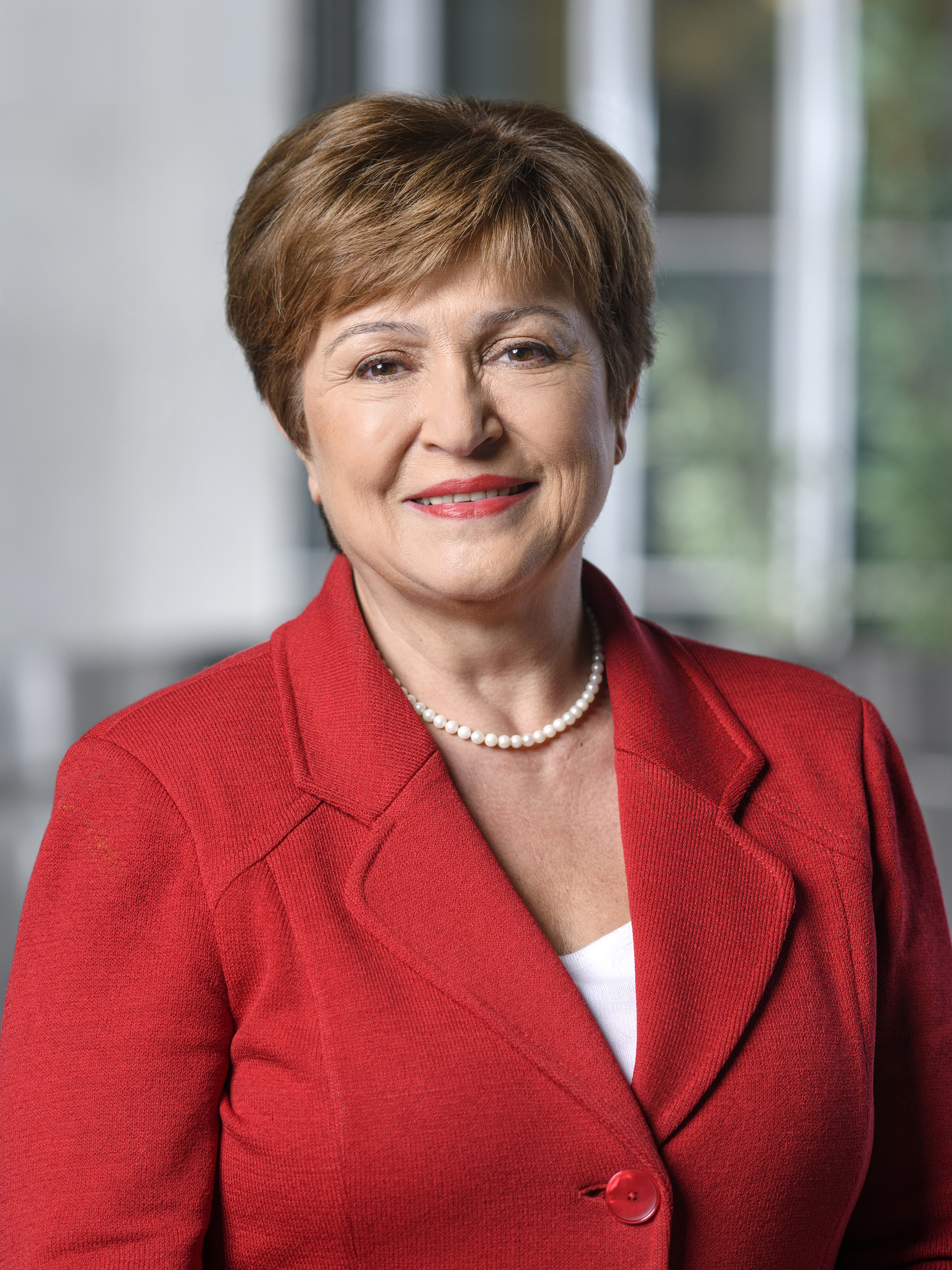
International Monetary Fund
Kristalina Georgieva,
Managing Director

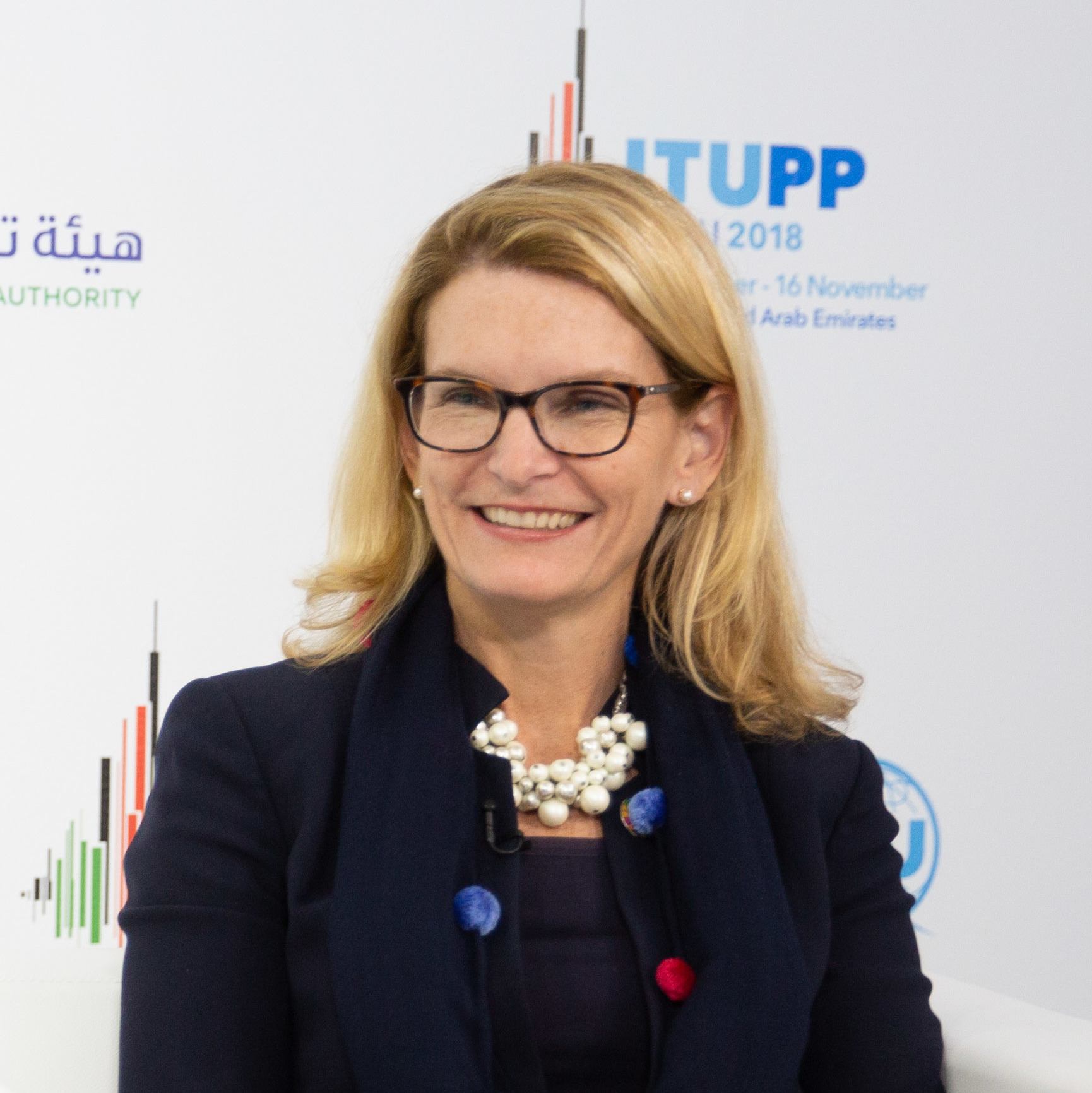
International Telecommunication Union
Doreen Bogdan-Martin,
Secretary-general

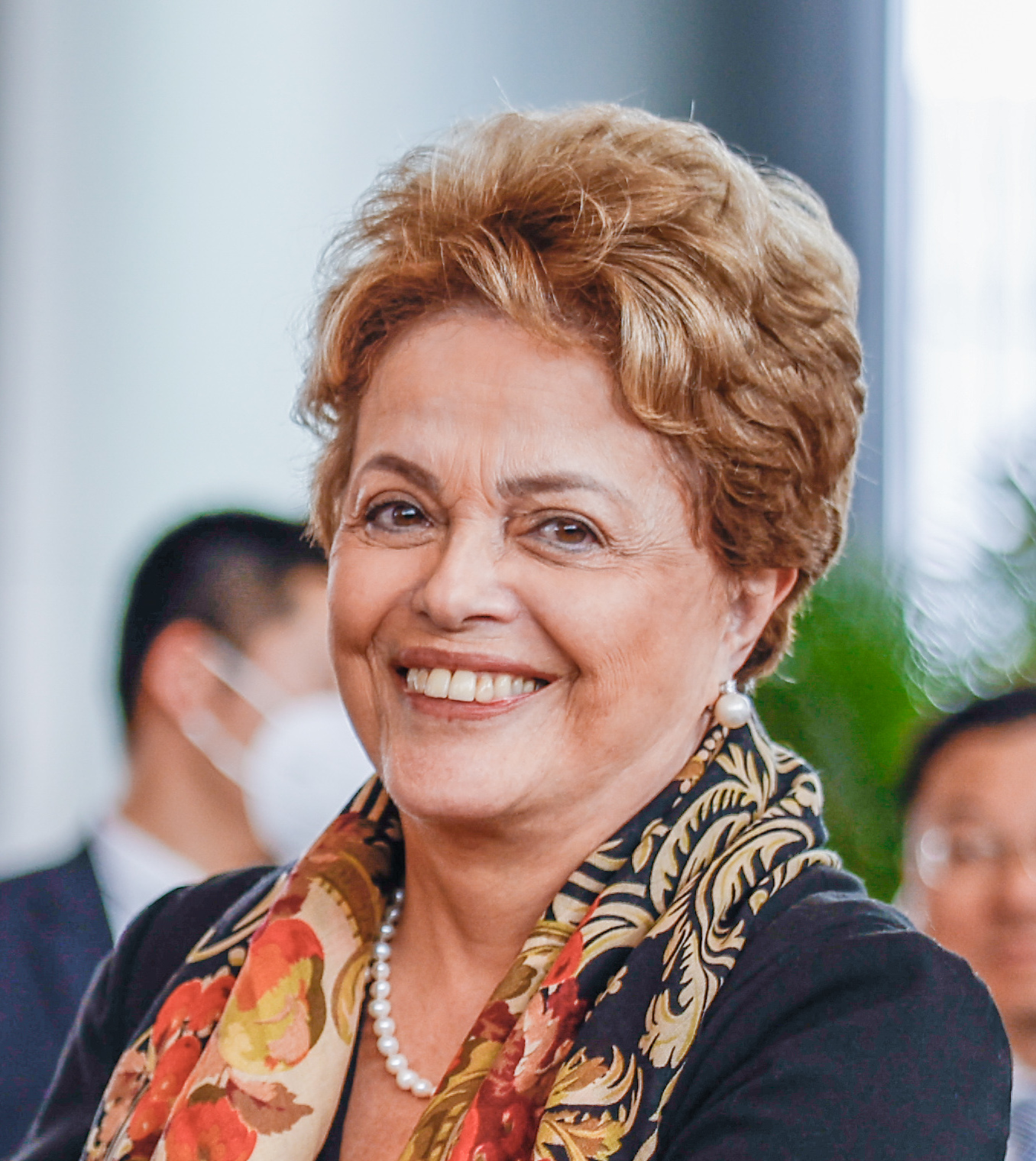
New Development Bank
Dilma Rousseff,
President

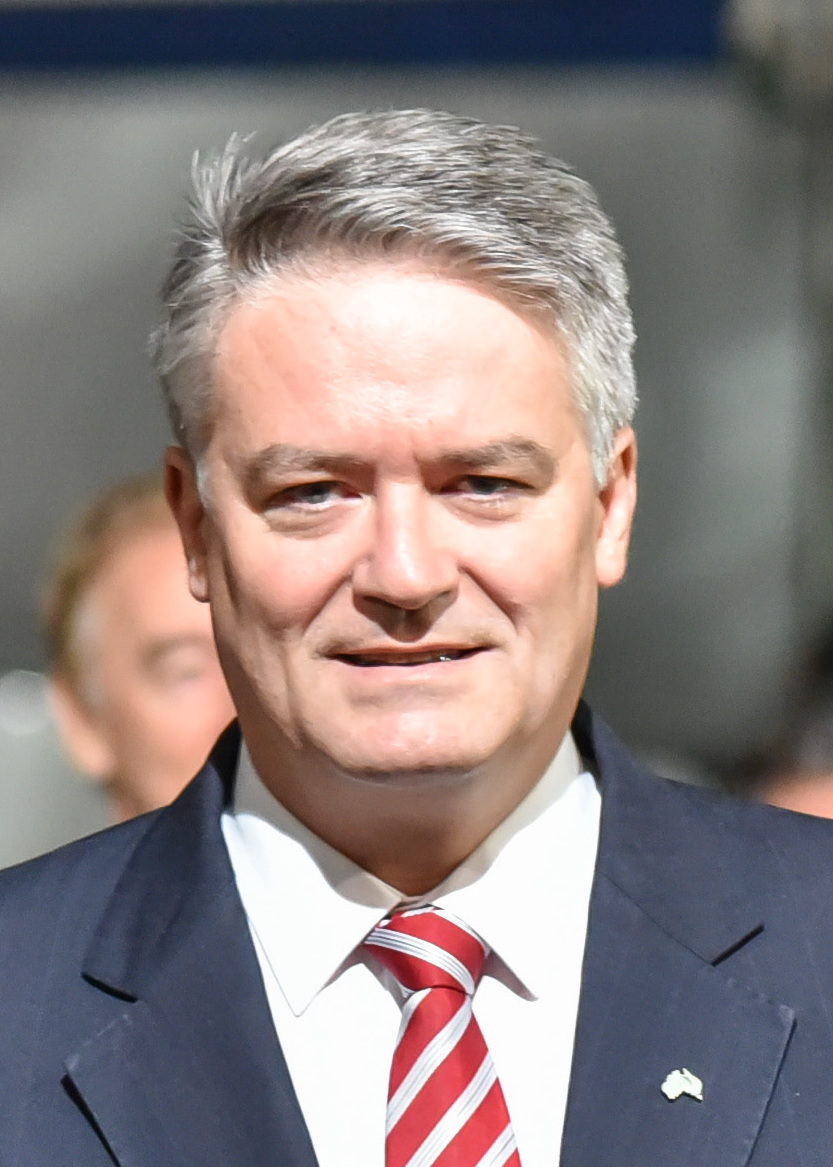
Organisation for Economic Co-operation and Development
Mathias Cormann,
Secretary General

South Centre
Carlos M. Correa,
Executive Director

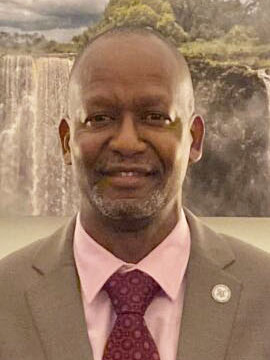
Southern African Development Community
Elias Magosi,
Executive Secretary

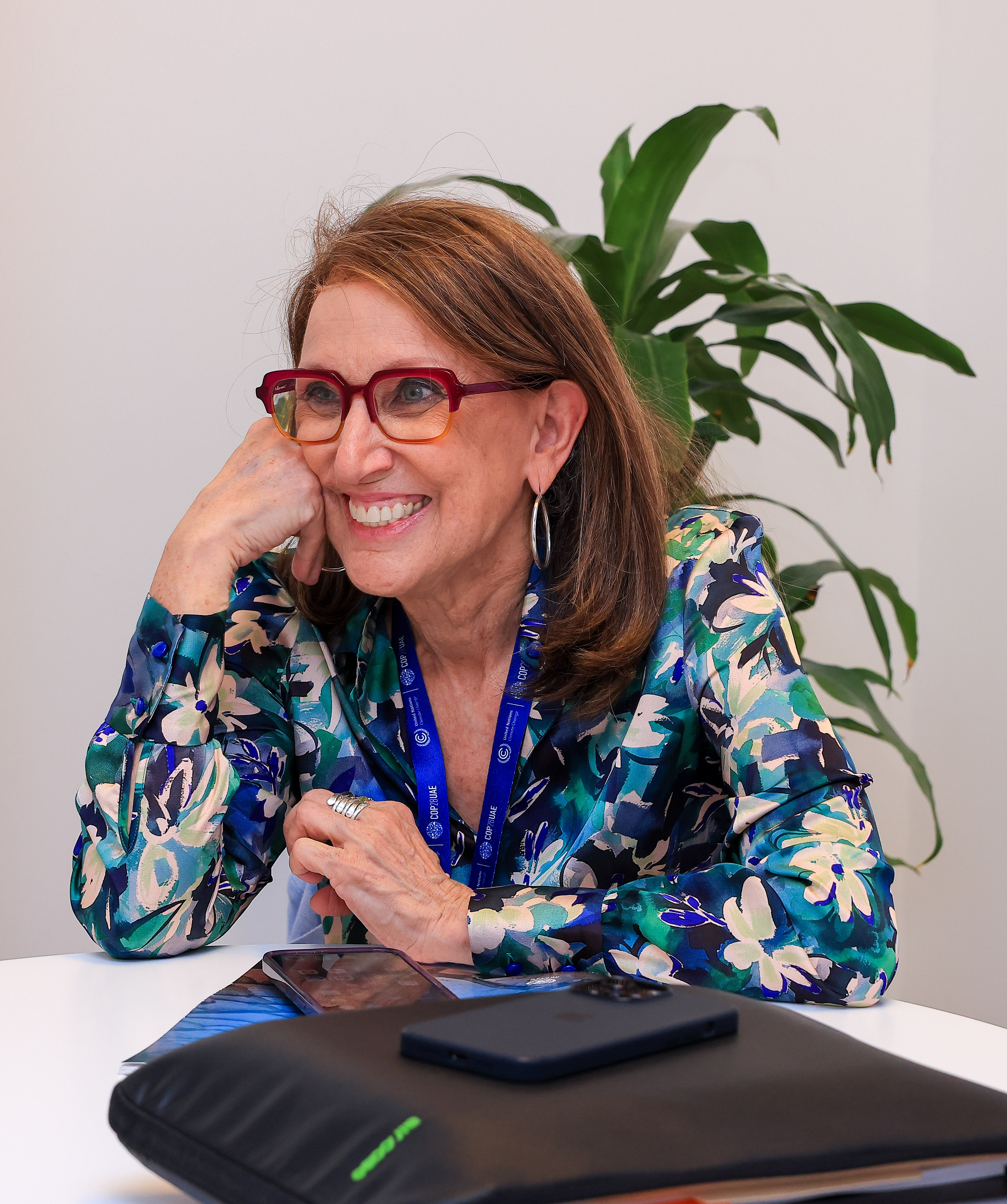
UN Trade and Development
Rebeca Grynspan,
Secretary-General

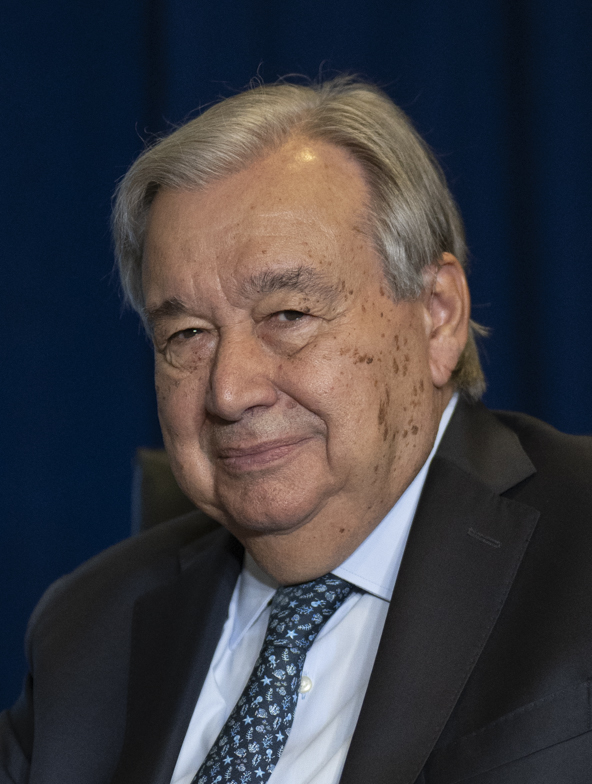
United Nations
António Guterres,
Secretary-General

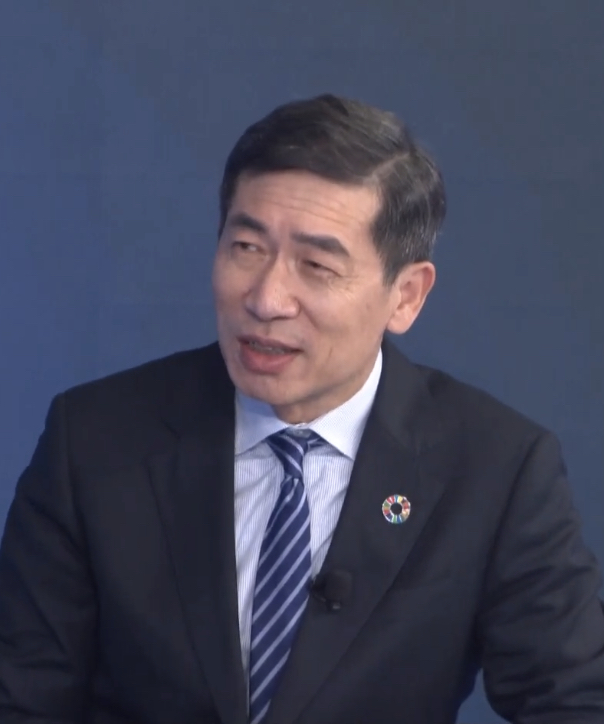
United Nations Development Programme
Haoliang Xu,
Administrator (acting)

United Nations Economic Commission for Africa
Claver Gatete,
Executive Secretary

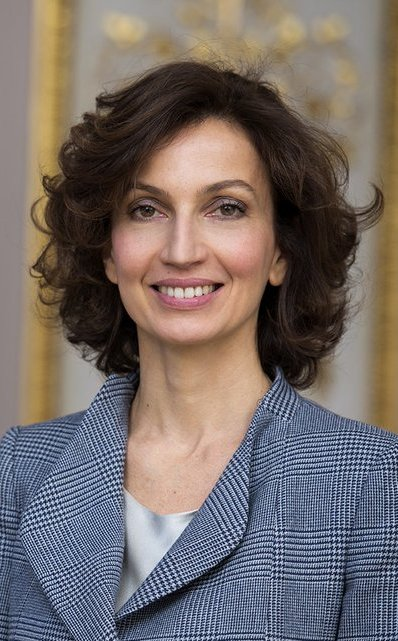
(UNESCO) United Nations Educational, Scientific and Cultural Organization
Audrey Azoulay,
Director-General

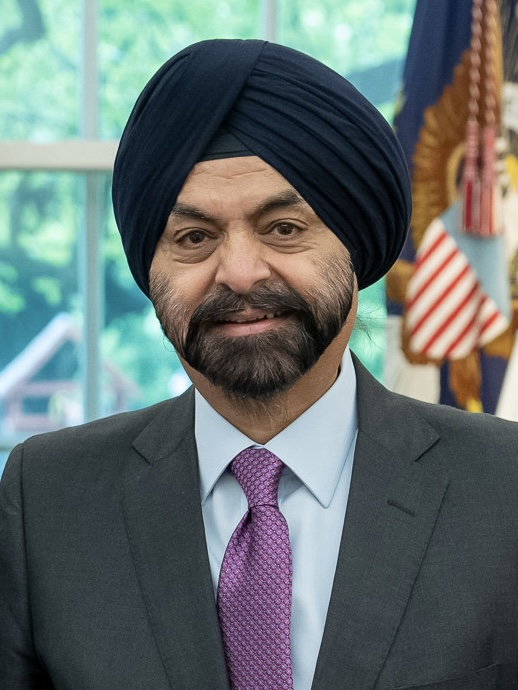
World Bank
Ajay Banga,
President

World Customs Organization
Ian Saunders,
Secretary General

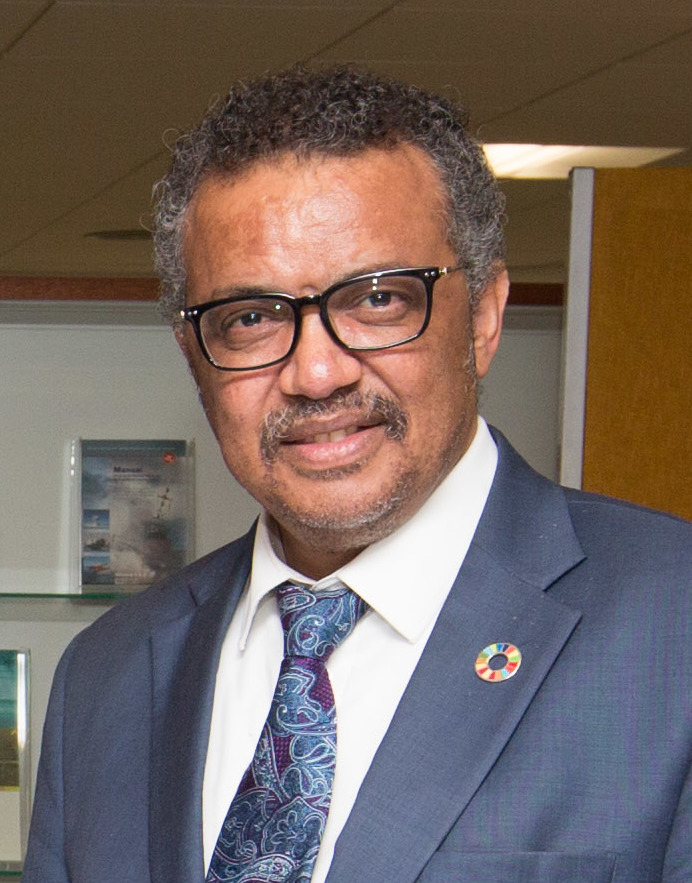
World Health Organization
Tedros Adhanom Ghebreyesus,
Director-General

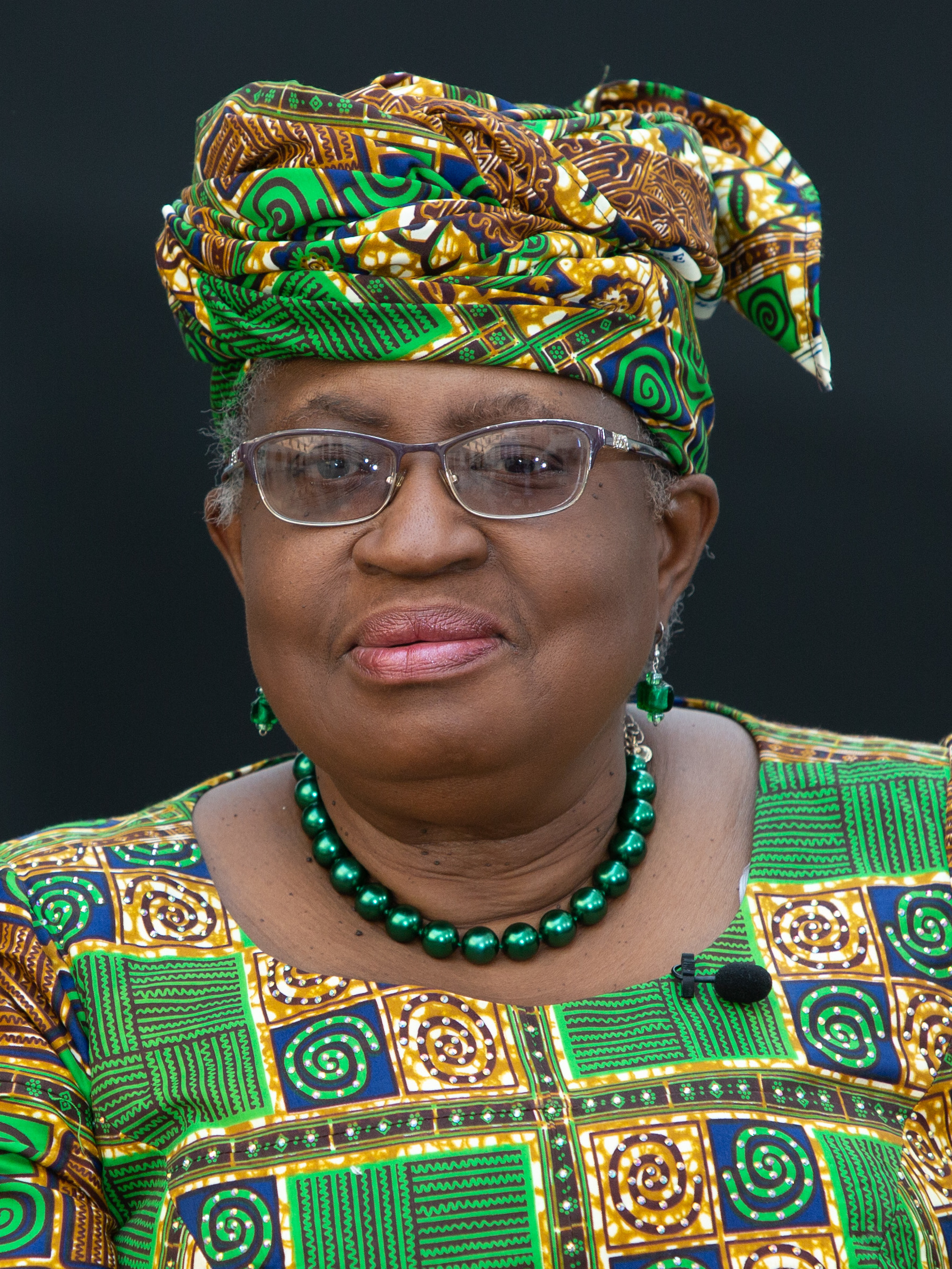
World Trade Organization
Ngozi Okonjo-Iweala,
Director-General

== Outcomes ==
=== Summit Declaration ===
Breaking with tradition, the South Africa G20 presidency tabled a Leader's statement at the beginning of the Johannesburg Summit. The Declaration of the first G20 summit hosted on African soil reflected its context, giving more visibility to African and Global South concerns. Despite a U.S. boycott, the declaration was adopted, underscoring a shift toward G20 unity around development, climate, and reform, in the spirit of multipolarity.

The leaders in attendance adopted a 122-point declaration which focused on advancing global equity, multilateral reform, and sustainable development. Argentina was the only nation not to subscribe to the document, with FM Quirno arguing that "context and geopolitical facts" were missing in the issue of the Middle East and the G20 call for conditions in Palestine. Centred on theme of "Solidarity, Equality, Sustainability", the declaration pushes for:

- Food security: Recognizing volatile food prices, supporting smallholder farmers, and endorsing “Ubuntu Approaches” to nutrition and price stability.
- Debt relief and financial reform: Restructuring international financial systems and addressing unmanageable debt in low- and middle-income nations.
- Climate resilience and energy transition: Scaling up climate finance, disaster risk reduction, and just transitions to clean energy.
- Inequality and global governance: Reforming global institutions (IMF, development banks) to better reflect Global South voices and reduce wealth disparities.
- Inclusive industrialisation: Promoting value chains in critical minerals, especially in Africa, rather than just raw exports.
- Peace and stability: Calling for just, lasting peace in conflict areas such as Ukraine, Sudan, DRC, and Palestine.
- Digital transformation: Recognizing the role of AI and technology in economic and social development (as noted in Ramaphosa's opening remarks).

== Participants ==
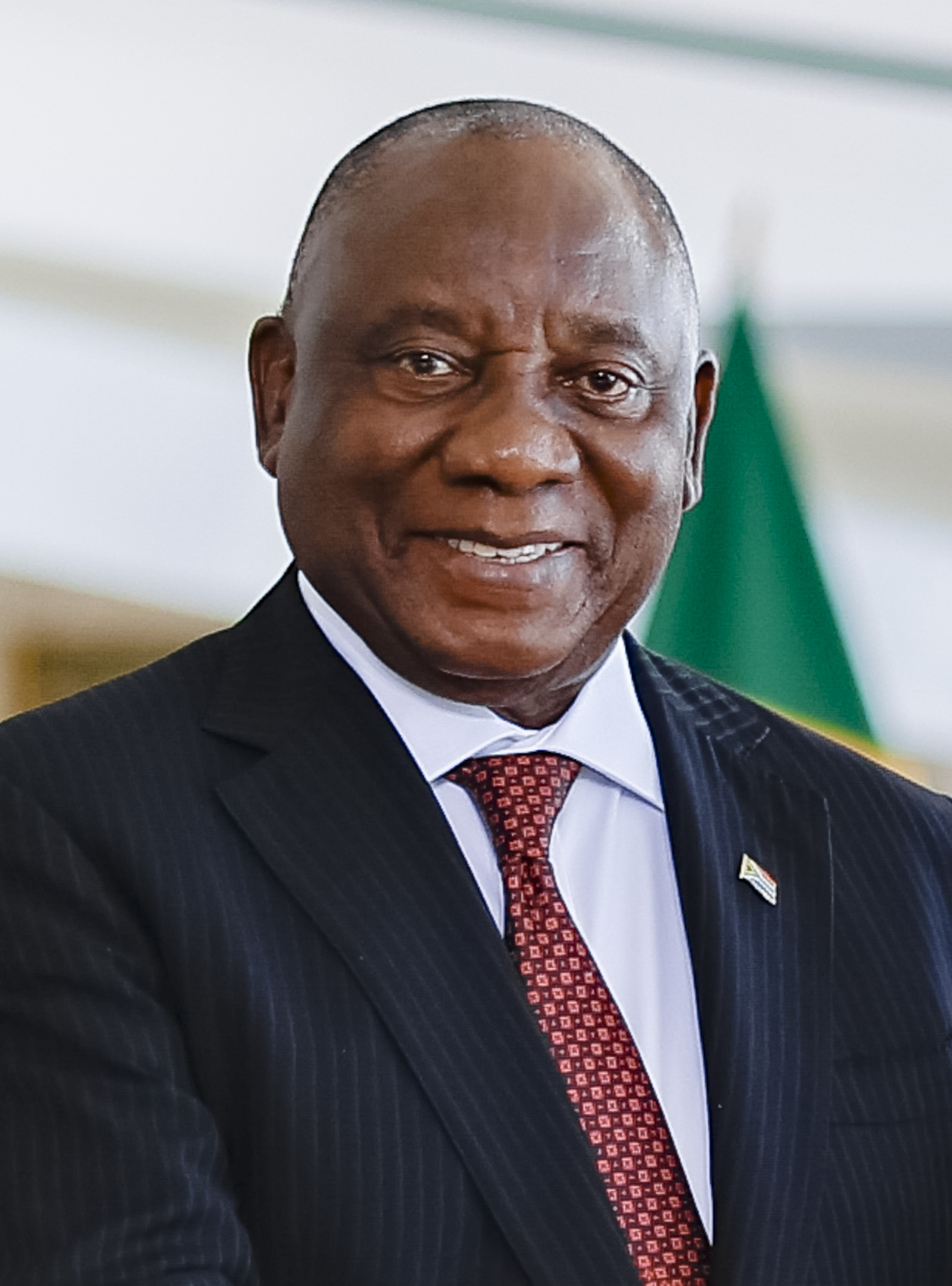
Cyril Ramaphosa chaired the 20th G20 summit.

=== Participating leaders and representatives ===
G20 members The host state and leader are shown in bold text. Population and economic figures are 2025 estimates. Nominal GDP is expressed in billions of United States dollars.
Member	Represented by	Title	Area (km²)	Population (2025)	Density (per km²)	GDP per capita (PPP, 2025)	Nominal GDP (2025, US$ billion)	HDI	Currency
Argentina	Pablo Quirno	Foreign Minister	2,780,400	45,851,000	16	$31,500	$683.4 billion	0.865	Argentine peso
Australia	Anthony Albanese	Prime Minister	7,692,024	27,500,000	4	$72,100	$1,881.0 billion	0.958	Australian dollar
Brazil	Luiz Inácio Lula da Silva	President	8,515,767	212,812,000	25	$22,600	$2,307.0 billion	0.786	Brazilian real
Canada	Mark Carney	Prime Minister	9,984,670	40,127,000	4	$65,100	$2,283.0 billion	0.939	Canadian dollar
China	Li Qiang	Premier	9,596,961	1,416,096,000	148	$28,900	$19,534.0 billion	0.797	Renminbi
France	Emmanuel Macron	President	643,801	66,549,000	103	$62,400	$3,283.0 billion	0.920	Euro
Germany	Friedrich Merz	Chancellor	357,600	84,075,000	235	$70,400	$4,922.0 billion	0.959	Euro
India	Narendra Modi	Prime Minister	3,287,263	1,463,866,000	445	$11,500	$4,187.0 billion	0.685	Indian rupee
Indonesia	Gibran Rakabuming Raka	Vice President	1,904,569	285,721,000	150	$17,300	$1,493.0 billion	0.728	Indonesian rupiah
Italy	Giorgia Meloni	Prime Minister	301,340	59,146,000	196	$59,400	$2,459.0 billion	0.915	Euro
Japan	Sanae Takaichi	Prime Minister	377,975	123,104,000	326	$54,900	$4,389.0 billion	0.925	Japanese yen
Mexico	Édgar Amador Zamora	Finance Minister	1,964,375	131,947,000	67	$27,000	$1,863.0 billion	0.789	Mexican peso
Russia	Maxim Oreshkin	Deputy Chief of Staff of the Presidential Executive Office	17,098,246	143,997,000	8	$45,900	$2,541.0 billion	0.832	Russian ruble
Saudi Arabia	Faisal bin Farhan Al Saud	Foreign Minister	2,149,690	34,700,000	16	$74,300	$1,084.0 billion	0.900	Saudi riyal
**South Africa (host)**	**Cyril Ramaphosa**	**President**	**1,221,037**	**64,747,000**	**53**	**$16,700**	**$410.0 billion**	**0.741**	**South African rand**
South Korea	Lee Jae Myung	President	100,210	51,667,000	516	$62,500	$1,947.0 billion	0.937	South Korean won
Turkey	Recep Tayyip Erdoğan	President	783,562	87,485,000	112	$43,200	$1,437.0 billion	0.853	Turkish lira
United Kingdom	Keir Starmer	Prime Minister	243,610	69,551,000	285	$61,700	$3,730.0 billion	0.946	Pound sterling
African Union	João Lourenço	African Union Chairperson	30,221,532	1,550,000,000	51	$7,500	$3,100.0 billion	—	Multiple currencies
European Union	António Costa	Council President	4,233,262	450,400,000	106	$60,400	$20,640.0 billion	—	Euro and other currencies
European Union	Ursula von der Leyen	Commission President	4,233,262	450,400,000	106	$60,400	$20,640.0 billion	—	Euro and other currencies
**Invited guests**
Country	Represented by	Title	Area (km²)	Population (2025)	Density (per km²)	GDP per capita (PPP, 2025)	Nominal GDP (2025, US$ billion)	HDI	Currency
Algeria	Sifi Ghrieb	Prime Minister	2,381,741	47,435,000	20	$18,000	$268.9 billion	0.763	Algerian dinar
Egypt	Mostafa Madbouly	Prime Minister	1,010,408	118,366,000	117	$21,000	$347.3 billion	0.754	Egyptian pound
Equatorial Guinea	Teodoro Obiang Nguema Mbasogo	President	28,051	1,938,000	69	$24,000	$12.8 billion	0.674	Central African CFA franc
Ethiopia	Abiy Ahmed	Prime Minister	1,104,300	135,472,000	123	$4,400	$205.1 billion	0.497	Ethiopian birr
Finland	Alexander Stubb	President	338,455	5,623,000	17	$62,900	$320.0 billion	0.948	Euro
Ireland	Micheál Martin	Taoiseach	70,273	5,458,000	78	$150,000	$708.0 billion	0.949	Euro
Jamaica	Andrew Holness	Prime Minister	10,991	2,837,000	258	$13,500	$21.8 billion	0.720	Jamaican dollar
Kenya	Lee Kinyanjui	Cabinet Secretary for Investments, Trade and Industry	580,367	57,532,000	99	$7,800	$132.0 billion	0.628	Kenyan shilling
Malaysia	Anwar Ibrahim	Prime Minister	330,803	35,978,000	109	$43,000	$488.0 billion	0.819	Malaysian ringgit
Namibia	Netumbo Nandi-Ndaitwah	President	825,615	3,092,000	4	$12,000	$14.7 billion	0.665	Namibian dollar
Netherlands	Dick Schoof	Prime Minister	41,865	18,346,000	438	$84,800	$1,273.0 billion	0.955	Euro
Nigeria	Bola Tinubu	President	923,768	237,528,000	257	$6,900	$253.0 billion	0.560	Nigerian naira
Norway	Jonas Gahr Støre	Prime Minister	385,207	5,623,000	15	$107,000	$504.0 billion	0.970	Norwegian krone
Qatar	Tamim bin Hamad Al Thani	Emir	11,586	3,115,000	269	$121,000	$222.0 billion	0.886	Qatari riyal
Sierra Leone	Julius Maada Bio	President	71,740	8,819,000	123	$3,100	$7.4 billion	0.467	Sierra Leonean leone
Singapore	Lawrence Wong	Prime Minister	735	5,871,000	7,988	$156,000	$565.0 billion	0.946	Singapore dollar
Spain	Pedro Sánchez	Prime Minister	505,990	47,890,000	95	$53,600	$1,799.0 billion	0.918	Euro
United Arab Emirates	Khaled bin Mohamed Al Nahyan	Crown Prince of Abu Dhabi	83,600	11,346,000	136	$90,000	$569.0 billion	0.940	United Arab Emirates dirham
Vietnam	Phạm Minh Chính	Prime Minister	331,212	101,599,000	307	$17,000	$506.0 billion	0.766	Vietnamese đồng
Zimbabwe	Constantino Chiwenga	Vice President	390,757	16,950,000	43	$4,400	$38.0 billion	0.598	Zimbabwe Gold

=== G20 member not represented ===
Member	Leader	Title	Status
United States	Donald Trump	President	Boycotted the summit and sent no representative

== See also ==
- 17th BRICS summit – 2025 international summit in Rio de Janeiro, Brazil
- 51st G7 summit – 2025 international leader meeting in Canada
- G20, a 2025 American film about a fictional G20 summit held in Cape Town, South Africa
- 7th European Union–African Union Summit – 2025 international summit in Luanda, Angola
