= List of countries by tax rates =

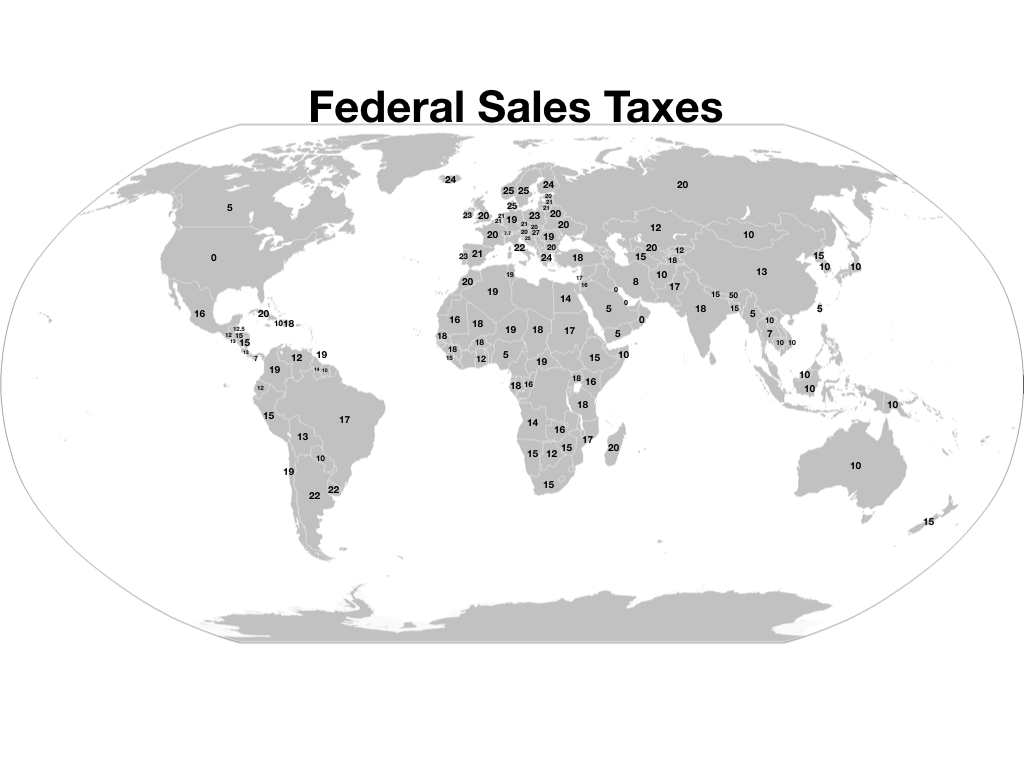
Map of the world showing national-level sales tax / VAT rates as of October 2019

Comparing tax rates across countries is difficult and somewhat subjective, as tax laws in most countries are extremely complex and the tax burden falls differently on different groups in each country and sub-national unit. The list focuses on the main types of taxes: corporate tax (excluding dividend taxes), individual income tax, capital gains tax, wealth tax (excluding property tax), property tax, inheritance tax and sales tax (incl. VAT and GST).

Personal income tax includes all applicable taxes, including all unvested social security contributions. Vested social security contributions are not included, as they contribute to personal wealth and will be repaid upon retirement or emigration, either as a lump sum or as a pension. Only social security contributions without a ceiling can be included in the highest marginal tax rate, as only those are effectively a tax for general distribution among the population.

The table is not exhaustive in representing the true tax burden to either the corporation or the individual in the listed country. The tax rates displayed are marginal and do not account for deductions, exemptions, or rebates. The effective rate is usually lower than the marginal rate. The tax rates given for federations (such as the USA and Canada) are averages and vary by state or province. Territories with different rates from their respective nations are in italics.

== Tax rates by countries and territories ==
| Tax jurisdiction | Corporate | Individual income | | Capital gains | Wealth | Property | Inheritance / Estate | VAT or GST or Sales | Further reading |
| Tax jurisdiction | Corporate | Lowest | Highest | Capital gains | Wealth | Property | Inheritance / Estate | VAT or GST or Sales | Further reading |
|---|---|---|---|---|---|---|---|---|---|
| Afghanistan | 20% | 0% | 20% | | | | | 0% (however, in Taliban run areas pre-Taliban rule, small fees were illegally added to groceries) | Taxation in Afghanistan |
| Albania | 15% | 0% | 23% | 15% | | | | 20% (standard); 6% (tourism services) | Taxation in Albania |
| Algeria | 19–26% | 0% | 35% | 15%(resident) 20% (non-resident) | | | | 19% (standard); 9% (basic items) | Taxation in Algeria |
| American Samoa | 34% | 4% | 6% | | | 0% | | 0% | Taxation in American Samoa |
| Andorra | 10% | 0% | 10% | | | | | 4.5% (standard); 9.5% (banking services); 2.5%, 1% or 0% (reduced rates) | Taxation in Andorra |
| Angola | 30% | 0% | 17% | 10% | | | | 14% | Taxation in Angola |
| Anguilla | 0% | 0% | | | | | | 0% | Taxation in Anguilla |
| Antigua and Barbuda | 25% | 0% | | | | | | 15% | Taxation in Antigua and Barbuda |
| Argentina | 35% (residents); 15% (non-residents) | 9% | 35% | 15% | | | | 21% | Taxation in Argentina |
| Armenia | 18% | 22% | 22% | 10–20% | | | | 20% | Taxation in Armenia |
| Aruba | 25% | 7% | 58.95% | | | | | 1.5% (turnover tax) | Taxation in Aruba |
| Australia | 30% (standard); 25% (base entity) (Note: Businesses with annual turnover above A$2 million pay 30%, all other business pay the lower 26% rate.) | 0% | 45% (Note: Excludes 2% Medicare levy.Excludes 1.5% Medicare Levy Surcharge Previously 50.5%, which included an additional 2% 'deficit levy' which expired in June 2017.) | 0–45% | No | | 0% | 10% (standard); 0% (essential items) | Taxation in Australia |
| Austria | 23% | 0% | 55% | 27.5% | No | | No, but stamp duty for inherited real estate. | 20% (standard); 13% (tourism services); 10% (basic items) | Taxation in Austria |
| Azerbaijan | 20% | 14% | 25% | | | | | 18% | Taxation in Azerbaijan |
| Azores | 13.6% (SMEs, up to a taxable profit of €15,000) 16.8% (general) | 0% (for monthly salaries up to €654 + social security charges) | 36.2% (for monthly salaries above €25,200 + social security charges) | | | | | 4% (reduced) 9% (intermediate) 16% (standard) | Taxation in Portugal |
| Bahamas | 0% | 0% | 8.8% (social security tax) | | | | | 12% (standard) | Taxation in the Bahamas |
| Bahrain | 0% | 0% | | | | | | 10% (standard rate); 0% (essential goods) | Taxation in Bahrain |
| Bangladesh | 32.5% | 0% | 25% | | | | | 15% | Taxation in Bangladesh |
| Barbados | 5.5% (under BBD$1 million); 3.0% (BBD$1–20 million); 2.5% (BBD$20–30 million); 1.0% (over BBD$30 million) | 25% | 38% | | | | | 17.5% (standard); 7.5% (hotel services) | Taxation in Barbados |
| Belarus | 20% | 43.37% (12% + 1% mandatory insurance + 35% social security) | | | | | | 20% (standard); 10% (reduced) | Taxation in Belarus |
| Belgium | 25% | 55%(single/secluded); 50% (legally married) | 60.45% (13.07% (mandatory social security tax), 50% (federal), 3–9% (municipal)) | 10% | No | | 80% | 21% (standard); 12% (restaurants); 6% (essential and selected goods) | Taxation in Belgium |
| Belize | 25% (general) 1.75% (small businesses with income below BZ$ 300.000) 19% (tourism related companies - incl. hotels and restaurants) 37.5% (banks and other financial institutions) | 25% | | 0% (except in some specific cases) | No | | | 12.5% | Taxation in Belize |
| Benin | 35% | 10% | 35% | | | | | 18% | Taxation in Benin |
| Bermuda | 0% | 0% | | | | | | 0% | Taxation in Bermuda |
| Bhutan | 26% | 0% | 25% | | | | | —N/a | Taxation in Bhutan |
| Bolivia | 29% | 0% | 25% | | | | | 13% | Taxation in Bolivia |
| Bosnia and Herzegovina | 10% | 10% | | | | | | 17% | Taxation in Bosnia and Herzegovina |
| Botswana | 22% | 0% | 25% | 25% | | | | 14% | Taxation in Botswana |
| Brazil | 40% (highest rate for financial institutions, insurance and capitalisation companies); 24–34% (general); 15% (+10% in profits exceeding BR$ 20.000 + 9% Social Contribution Tax or 15% for financial institutions, insurance and capitalisation companies) | 0% | 27.5% | 22.5% | | | 8% | 20–30.7% | Taxation in Brazil |
| Brunei | 1% (sole proprietorships and partnerships) 18.5% (all other businesses) | 0% | | 0% | | | | —N/a | Taxation in Brunei |
| Bulgaria | 10% (+5% on distribution of profit) | 10% | 10% | | | | | 20% (9% on hotel and camping accommodation) | Taxation in Bulgaria |
| Burkina Faso | 27.5% | 0% | 25% | | | | | 18% | Taxation in Burkina Faso |
| Burundi | 35% | 0% | 35% | | | | | 18% | Taxation in Burundi |
| Cambodia | 20% | 0% | 20% | | | | | 10% | Taxation in Cambodia |
| Cameroon | 31.5% | 10% | 35% | | | | | 19.25% | Taxation in Cameroon |
| Canada | 26.5–31% (higher); 9–13% (lower) | 18% (14% federal + 4% in Nunavut) 25.69% (11.69% federal + 14% in Quebec) | 54.8% (33% federal + 21.8% in Newfoundland and Labrador) 44.5% (33% federal + 11.5% in Nunavut) | 27.4% | No | | No, however the deceased is considered to have sold all of their capital property for Fair Market Value immediately prior to death. Gains are added to income of the deceased on their final return. | 5% (5% federal tax in Alberta and the territories) to 15% (5% federal tax + 10% provincial tax in New Brunswick, Newfoundland and Labrador, and Prince Edward Island) | Taxation in Canada |
| Cape Verde | 25% | 16.5% | 27.5% | | | | | 15% | Taxation in Cape Verde |
| Cayman Islands | 0% | 0% | | | | | | 0% (Note: While there is no sales tax or GST, the Cayman Islands impose various import duties on goods imported to the island nation.) | Taxation in the Cayman Islands |
| Central African Republic | 30% | —N/a | 50% | | | | | 19% | Taxation in the Central African Republic |
| Chad | 20% | —N/a | —N/a | —N/a | | | | —N/a | Taxation in Chad |
| Chile | 25–27% | 0% (for monthly taxable incomes under US$950) | 40% (for monthly taxable incomes over US$190,000) | 10% | No | | 25% | 19% | Taxation in Chile |
| China | 25% (standard) 15% (concession rate for high-tech companies) | 0% | 45% | 20% | | 0% - The Chinese government owns all lands in China and the government does not tax homeowners. | 0% | 13% (standard); 9% (energy, books, transportation, etc.); 6% (other services); 0% (goods and services for export) | Taxation in China |
| Colombia | 35% | 0% | 35% (non-labor income); 39% (labor income) | 10% (standard); 20% (lotteries, gaming, or similar activities) | Yes | | | 19% (standard); 5% or 0% (reduced rates) | Taxation in Colombia |
| Comoros | 35% | —N/a | —N/a | —N/a | | | | —N/a | Taxation in the Comoros |
| Cook Islands | 20–30% | 18.5% | 30% | | | 0% | | 15% | Taxation in the Cook Islands |
| DR Congo | 35% | 0% | 40% | | | | | 5–20% | Taxation in the Democratic Republic of the Congo |
| Congo | 30% | —N/a | —N/a | | | | | 18.9% | Taxation in the Republic of the Congo |
| Costa Rica | 30% | 0% | 25% | | No | | | 13% (standard); 4% (private healthcare and plane tickets); 2% (medicines and private education); 1% (essential foods and agriculture) | Taxation in Costa Rica |
| Croatia | 18% (over 3 million kn); 12% (under 3 million kn) | 12% | 40% | 10% | | | 5% | 25% (standard); 13% (certain essential groceries) | Taxation in Croatia |
| Cuba | 30% | 15% | 50% | | | | | 2.5–20% | Taxation in Cuba |
| Curaçao | 22% | 9.75% | 46.5% | | | | | 6%, 7% or 9% | Taxation in Curaçao |
| Cyprus | 15% | 0% | 35% | 20% | | | | 19% (standard); 9%, 5%, 3% or 0% (reduced rates) | Taxation in Cyprus |
| Czech Republic | 21% | 20.1% (15% deductible tax + 45% healthcare and social security if an employee, 22.5% if self-employed) | 45.7% (peaks for employee gross annual income of $90,000 or more); 39% (for gross annual income of $450,000 or more) | 15% | No | | | 21% (standard); 12% (reduced) | Taxation in the Czech Republic |
| Denmark | 22–25% (depending on business) | 39.86% (34.63% for unemployed; first DKK46,000 / US$7,245 / €6,172 per year is deductible) | 52.07% | 42% | No | | 15% | 25% | Taxation in Denmark |
| Djibouti | 25% | —N/a | —N/a | | | | | —N/a | Taxation in Djibouti |
| Dominica | 25% | 0% | 35% | | | | | 15% | Taxation in Dominica |
| Dominican Republic | 27% | 0% | 25% | 27% | | | | 18% | Taxation in the Dominican Republic |
| Timor-Leste | 10% | —N/a | —N/a | | | | | —N/a | Taxation in East Timor |
| Ecuador | 25% | 0% | 35% | 35% | | | 35% | 12% (standard); 15% (luxury goods); 0% (exports) | Taxation in Ecuador |
| Egypt | 22.5% (on taxable corporate profits) (+ 5% on distribution of profit) | 0% | 27.5% | | | | | 14% (standard); 10% (professional services); 0% (exports) | Taxation in Egypt |
| El Salvador | 30% | 0% | 30% | | | | | 13% | Taxation in El Salvador |
| Equatorial Guinea | 35% | 0% | 35% | | | | | 15% | Taxation in Equatorial Guinea |
| Eritrea | 34% | —N/a | —N/a | | | | | —N/a | Taxation in Eritrea |
| Estonia | 0% (20% on distribution or 14% on distribution below the 3 previous years average) | 6.9% (for minimum wage full-time work in 2024; excluding social security taxes paid by the employer) | 23.6% (for employees earning over €25,200 per year in 2024: includes 20% flat income tax + 2% mandatory pension contribution + 1.6% unemployment insurance paid by employee); excluding social security taxes paid by the employer and taxes on dividends | 20% | No | | 0% | 24% (standard); 9% (reduced) | Taxation in Estonia |
| Eswatini (Swaziland) | 27.5% | 0% | 33% | | | | | 15% | Taxation in Eswatini |
| Ethiopia | 30% | 0% | 35% | | | | | —N/a | Taxation in Ethiopia |
| Falkland Islands | 26% | 0% | 26% | 15% | | | | 0% | Taxation in the Falkland Islands |
| Faroe Islands | 18% | 20% | | | | 0% | | | Taxation in the Faroe Islands |
| Federated States of Micronesia | 21% | —N/a | —N/a | | | | | —N/a | Taxation in Micronesia |
| Fiji | 20% | 0% | 20% | | | | | 9% | Taxation in Fiji |
| Finland | 20% 18% (from 2027) | 8.4% (social security tax) | 53.61% (in Halsua for the members of the Orthodox Church of Finland: 31.25% national tax rate + 23.5% municipal tax + 9.9% social security tax + 2.1% church tax) | 34% | No | | 33% | 25.5% (standard); 14% (food and fodder); 10% (medicines and public transport) | Taxation in Finland |
| France | 25% | 0% | 55.34% (45% IR + 4% CEHR + 9.2% CSG + 0.5% CRDS + 0.4% Old-age insurance + 6% PER) | 31,4% (+4% for high earners) | Yes | | 0-60% | 20% (standard); 10% (restaurants, transportation and tourism services); 5.5% (utilities); 2.1% (press) | Taxation in France |
| French Polynesia | 25% | —N/a | —N/a | | | | | —N/a | Taxation in French Polynesia |
| Gabon | 35% | 5% | 35% | | | | | 18% | Taxation in Gabon |
| Gambia | 31% | 0% | 30% | | | | | —N/a | Taxation in the Gambia |
| Germany | 30% (15% corporate tax (+ 5.5% solidarity surcharge) + 7% to 17% trade tax) | 19.6% (social security contributions) 0% (earning under €11,604 per year) | 45% (+ 39.2% social security contributions up to €90,600 per year, half paid by employer (14.6% health + 18.6% pension + 3.4% care + 2.6% unemployment)) | 25% | Inactive | Yes | 50% | 19% (standard); 7% (reduced) | Taxation in Germany |
| Georgia | 0% (15% on distribution of profit) | 20% (5% on dividend, interest and royalty) | | | | | 0% | 18% | Taxation in Georgia |
| Ghana | 25% | 25% | —N/a | | | | | 3% | Taxation in Ghana |
| Gibraltar | 10% | 17% | 40% | | | | | 0% | Taxation in Gibraltar |
| Greece | 22% | 9% (zero tax for annual income under €8633,33) | 44% | 15% | No | | 20% | 24% (standard); 13% (food, health and tourism services); 6% (theater tickets, books and medicine); VAT is reduced by 30% for the islands of Leros, Lesvos, Kos, Samos, Chios (i.e., 17%, 9%, 4%). | Taxation in Greece |
| Greenland | 25% | | 44% | | | 0% | | 0% | Taxation in Greenland |
| Grenada | 28% | —N/a | —N/a | | | | | —N/a | Taxation in Grenada |
| Guatemala | 25% | 5% | 7% | | | | | 12% | Taxation in Guatemala |
| Guernsey | 0% | 0% (earning under £658.67 per month) | 20% (+ 6.6–11.3% Social Security) | | | | Document duty charged on real estate transfers from estates. | 0% | Taxation in Guernsey |
| Guinea | 35% | —N/a | —N/a | | | | | —N/a | Taxation in Guinea |
| Guinea-Bissau | 35% | —N/a | —N/a | | | | | —N/a | Taxation in Guinea-Bissau |
| Guyana | 30% | 25% (chargeable income under $3,120,000 GYD) | 35% (chargeable income over $3,120,000 GYD) | | | | | 14% (standard); 0% (reduced) | Taxation in Guyana |
| Haiti | 30% | 0% | 30% | | | | | 10% | Taxation in Haiti |
| Honduras | 25% | —N/a | —N/a | | | | | —N/a | Taxation in Honduras |
| Hong Kong | 16.5% (over HK$2 million); 8.25% (under HK$2 million) | 0% | 15% | | | | 0% | 0% | Taxation in Hong Kong |
| Hungary | 9% | 15% (+ 18.5% social security + 13% social contribution tax) | | 15% | No | | 18% | 27% (standard); 18% (reduced); 5% (certain foods, internet service, restaurant services, medicines and books) | Taxation in Hungary |
| Iceland | 20% | 31.48% (On income up to 446.136 ISK) | 46.28% | 22% | No | | 10% | 24% (standard); 11% (reduced) | Taxation in Iceland |
| India | 15–22% (excludes surcharge & cess) | 0% (₹ 0 - 400,000 + 12% of basic salary for epf or social security) | 39% (including Surcharge & Health and Education Cess for Income greater than Rs.20,000,000) | 12.5% (LTCG) 20% (STCG) | | | 0% | 40% (Luxury and Sin Goods rate) 18% (standard) 5%, 0% (Essential Goods & Services rate) (varies by commodity; see GST rates in India) | Taxation in India |
| Indonesia | 22% | 5% | 35% | | | | | 11% | Taxation in Indonesia |
| Iran | 25% | 0% | 35% | | | | | 0–9% | Taxation in Iran |
| Iraq | 15% | 3% | 15% | | | | | 300% (Alcohol and tobacco) 15% (Cars and travel) 20% (Mobile recharge cards and internet) 10% (Deluxe and first class restaurants and hotels) | Taxation in Iraq |
| Ireland | 12.5% | 20% (first €1,650 per year is deductible) | 52.1% (40% + 12.1% social insurance contributions on incomes above €44,000) | 33% | No | | 33% | 23% (goods); 9–13.5% (services); 0% (certain items of food) | Taxation in Ireland |
| Isle of Man | 0% | 0% (First 17000 GBP is tax free) | 21% | | | | | 20% (standard rate); 5% (home renovations) | Taxation in the Isle of Man |
| Israel | 23% | 0% (for monthly income under 6,330₪) | 50% | 25% | No | | 0% | 18% (standard); 0% (fruits and vegetables) | Taxation in Israel |
| Italy | 27.9% (24% + 3.9% on tax-adjusted EBITDA) | 23% (first €8,500 per year is deductible); + municipal and local taxes (0-3%) | 43% (+ municipal and local taxes (0-3%)) | 26% | No | | 4% | 22% (standard); 10% (reduced rate on certain products e.g. food); 4% (on products of first necessity) | Taxation in Italy |
| Ivory Coast | 25% | —N/a | —N/a | | | | | —N/a | Taxation in the Ivory Coast |
| Jamaica | 33.3% (standard); 25% (reduced rate for small companies) | 0% (on income up to J$1,774,554) | 30% (on income over J$6,000,000) | | | | | 20% (services); 16.5% (goods) | Taxation in Jamaica |
| Japan | 29.74% | 15.105% (10% local + 5.105% national) | 50.5% (45% national + 10% local) | 20.315% | No | | 55% | 10% (standard); 8% (groceries and takeout food and subscription newspaper) | Taxation in Japan |
| Jersey | 0% | 0% | 20% | | | | Stamp duty on probate starting at £50, rising progressively. | 5% | Taxation in Jersey |
| Jordan | 20% | 0% | 25% | | | | | 16% | Taxation in Jordan |
| Kazakhstan | 20% | 10% | 10% (residents); 15% (non-residents) | | | | | 16% | Taxation in Kazakhstan |
| Kenya | 30% | 10% | 35% | | | | | 16% (standard); 12% (electricity and fuel); 0% (food) | Taxation in Kenya |
| Kiribati | 35% | —N/a | —N/a | | | | | —N/a | Taxation in Kiribati |
| Kosovo | 10% | 0% | 10% | | | | | 0% | Taxation in Kosovo |
| Kuwait | 7.5–16% (Rate of 15% typically applies except for regions under Saudi control where it's 7.5% tax, plus add a possible 1% tax for Zakat) | 0% | | | | 0% | | 0% | Taxation in Kuwait |
| North Korea | 25% | 0% | 20% | | | | | 10% | Taxation in North Korea |
| Kyrgyzstan | 10% | 10% | | | | | | 12% (standard); 1–5% | Taxation in Kyrgyzstan |
| Laos | 35% | —N/a | —N/a | | | | | —N/a | Taxation in Laos |
| Latvia | 0% (20% on distribution of profit) | 20% | 31.4% | 20% | No | | | 21% (standard); 12% (Medical products, domestic public transport); 5% (Fresh fruits and vegetables, books, newspapers) | Taxation in Latvia |
| Lebanon | 17% | 2% | 25% | | | | | 11% | Taxation in Lebanon |
| Lesotho | 25% | —N/a | —N/a | | | | | —N/a | Taxation in Lesotho |
| Liberia | 25% | —N/a | —N/a | | | | | —N/a | Taxation in Liberia |
| Libya | 24.5% (20% + 4% Jehad tax + 0.5% corporate income tax to pay for stamp duties) | —N/a | —N/a | | | | | —N/a | Taxation in Libya |
| Liechtenstein | 12.5% | 3% | 22.4% | 0% (share sales) 24% (real estate) | | | | 8.1% (standard); 3.8% (lodging services); 2.5% (reduced) | Taxation in Liechtenstein |
| Lithuania | 15% | 31.2% | 42.77% | 15% | No | | | 21% (standard); 9% (publications, accommodation services etc.); 5% (medicine, newspapers and magazines etc.); 0% (certain goods and services) | Taxation in Lithuania |
| Luxembourg | 28.69% (17% income tax + 1.19% unemployment fund contribution + 6.0–10.5% municipal trade tax | 8% | 44.2% (42% + 3.78% unemployment fund surcharge) | | No | | 0% | 17% (standard); 3% (reduced) | Taxation in Luxembourg |
| Macau | 12% | 0% | 12% | | | | | 0% | Taxation in Macau |
| Madagascar | 20% | —N/a | —N/a | | | | | —N/a | Taxation in Madagascar |
| Madeira | 5% (licensed companies in the International Business Centre of Madeira). 13% (SMEs, applicable up to a taxable profit of €15000) 20% (general) | 0% (for monthly salaries up to €659) + social security charges | 45.1% (for monthly salaries above €25,275 + social security charges) | | | | | 5% (reduced) 12% (intermediate) 22% (standard) | Taxation in Madeira |
| Malawi | 30% | 0% | 35% | | | | | —N/a | Taxation in Malawi |
| Malaysia | 18–24% | 0% | 30% (+ 11% for EPF + 0.5% for SOCSO) | 2-10% | | | | 10% (standard rate for goods); 7% (services); 5% (reduced rate for goods) | Taxation in Malaysia |
| Maldives | 8–15% | 0% | 0% (expatriates) 15% (nationals) | | | | | 6% | Taxation in the Maldives |
| Mali | 30% | —N/a | —N/a | | | | | —N/a | Taxation in Mali |
| Malta | 35% (unless eligible for 30% rebate) | 0% | 35% | | | 0% | 0% | 18% _{(7% and 5% for certain goods and services)} | Taxation in Malta |
| Marshall Islands | 0.8–3% | 0% | 12% | | | | | 2–4% | Taxation in the Marshall Islands |
| Mauritania | 25% | —N/a | —N/a | | | 0% | | —N/a | Taxation in Mauritania |
| Mauritius | 15% | 0% | 15% | | | | | 15% | Taxation in Mauritius |
| Mexico | 30% | 1.92% | 35% (+ reduction of deductions (topes)) | | No | | 0% | 16% | Taxation in Mexico |
| Moldova | 12% | 12% | 12% (+ 24% for social security) | | | | | 20% (standard); 10% (HoReCa) | Taxation in Moldova |
| Monaco | 0% (25% for companies generating more than 25% of their turnover outside Monaco) | 0% | | | | | | 20% (standard) 10% (reduced) 5.5% (basic products) | Taxation in Monaco |
| Mongolia | 10% | 10% | | | | | | 10% | Taxation in Mongolia |
| Montenegro | 9% | 9% (first €720) | 12.65% (11% national tax + 15% municipality surtax on income tax) 15% (entrepreneurs on their worldwide income) | | | | | 21% 7% (essential goods - basic foodstufs, water, pharmaceuticals, books, tourism services, etc.); 0% (postal services, education, social security services, healthcare, insurance, etc.) | Taxation in Montenegro |
| Montserrat | 20% | —N/a | —N/a | | | | | —N/a | Taxation in Montserrat |
| Morocco | 10–31% | 0% | 38% | | | | | 20% (standard); 14%, 10%, 7% (reduced rates) | Taxation in Morocco |
| Mozambique | 32% | —N/a | —N/a | | | | | —N/a | Taxation in Mozambique |
| Myanmar | 22% | —N/a | —N/a | | | | | —N/a | Taxation in Myanmar |
| Namibia | 32% | 0% | 37% | | | | | 15% | Taxation in Namibia |
| Nauru | 25% | —N/a | —N/a | | | | | —N/a | Taxation in Nauru |
| Nepal | 30% (higher rate for financial companies); 25% (standard); 20% (reduced rate for manufacturing companies) (+ 5% on profit distribution + 10% mandatory bonus to employees) | 0% (+ 1% social security tax) | 36% (Including 20% additional tax) | | | | | 13% (standard); 288% (for imported vehicles) | Taxation in Nepal |
| Netherlands | 25.8% (on EBT surplus over €200,000); 19% (on EBT under €200,000) | 0% (first €8,700 per year is tax free) | 49.5% | 36% | No | | 40%, 36%, 20% (total value > €154.179); 20%, 18%, 10% (total value < €154.179) (Note: Rates are for other inheritors, grandchildren & further descendants, and partners & children respectively.) | 21% (standard); 9% (essential and selected goods) | Taxation in the Netherlands |
| New Zealand | 28% | 10.5% | 39% | | No | | 0% | 15% | Taxation in New Zealand |
| New Caledonia | 30% | 0% | 40% (residents); 25% (non-residents) | | | | | —N/a | Taxation in New Caledonia |
| Nicaragua | 30% | —N/a | —N/a | | | | | —N/a | Taxation in Nicaragua |
| Niger | 30% | —N/a | —N/a | | | | | 7% | Taxation in Niger |
| Nigeria | 30% | 7% | 24% | | | | | 7.5% | Taxation in Nigeria |
| Niue | 0% | —N/a | —N/a | | | | | 12.5% | Taxation in Niue |
| Norfolk Island | 0% | —N/a | —N/a | | | 0% | | —N/a | Taxation in Norfolk Island |
| North Macedonia | 10% | 10% | 18% | | | | | 18% (standard); 5% (reduced) | Taxation in North Macedonia |
| Norway | 22% | 0% (for yearly income under 100,000 NOK) | 47.4% | 37.84% | Yes | Varies by municipality | 0% | 25% (standard rate); 15% (food and drink); 12% (transportation, cinema and hotel services) | Taxation in Norway |
| Oman | 15% | 0% | | | | | | 5% | Taxation in Oman |
| Pakistan | 1.25% (minimum) 20% (small) 29%(corporate) | 0% (under Rs 600,000 per annum) | 45% (over Rs 5.6 Million per annum) | 15% | | Exempt | 0% | 18% (+3% for non-registered goods) 15% (services); 0% (basic food items) | Taxation in Pakistan |
| Palau | 12% | —N/a | —N/a | | | 0% | | —N/a | Taxation in Palau |
| Palestine | 15% | 5% | 15% | | | | | 14.5% | Taxation in Palestine |
| Panama | 25% | 0% | 27% | | | | | 7% (standard); 15% (tobacco); 10% (alcohol and hotels); 5% (essential goods) | Taxation in Panama |
| Papua New Guinea | 30% | —N/a | —N/a | | | | | —N/a | Taxation in Papua New Guinea |
| Paraguay | 10% | 8% | 10% | | No | | | 10% | Taxation in Paraguay |
| Peru | 30% | 0% | 30% | | | | | 16% (standard) + 2% (municipal promotional tax) + 0–118% (impuesto selectivo al consumo: liquor, cigarettes, etc.) | Taxation in Peru |
| Philippines | 30% | 0% | 35% | 5-10% | | | 6% | 12% (standard); 0% (reduced) | Taxation in the Philippines |
| Pitcairn Islands | 0% | 0% | | | | | | 0% | Taxation in the Pitcairn Islands |
| Poland | 19% (9% for small taxpayer, those with revenue in a given tax year not exceeding the equivalent of €1.2 million and that have "small taxpayer" status) | 9% (under 30.000 złotych per year, 0% income tax, 9% Health Insurance(non-deductible)) | 41% or 45% (32% + 9% health insurance + 4% solidarity tax above 1.000.000 złotych per year) 23.9% or 27.9% (self employed: not deduction first 30.000 złotych, 19% + 4.9% health insurance +4% solidarity tax above 1 million złotych) | 19% | No | | 7% | 23% (standard); 8% or 5% (reduced rates) | Taxation in Poland |
| Portugal | 20% (in mainland) | 13% | 56.03% (48% income tax + 5% solidarity rate + 11% social security) | 28% | No | | 0% | 23% (standard); 13% (intermediate); 6% (reduced) | Taxation in Portugal |
| Puerto Rico | 20% | 0% (16% proposed) | 33.34% | | | | | 11.5% | Taxation in Puerto Rico |
| Qatar | 10% | 0% | | | | | | 0% | Taxation in Qatar |
| Romania | 16% (or 1% revenue for micro-entities with at least one employee, or 3% for micro-enterprises with no employees) | 35% (25% social security (CAS) + 10% health insurance (CASS) + 0% income tax for people with disabilities. 0% income tax for IT workers earning less than 10000 RON). | 45% (25% social security (CAS) + 10% health insurance (CASS) + 10% income tax after CAS and CASS) Self employed (PFA): (25% CAS if earning more than 12 minimum wages in a year + 10% CASS, taxable sum capped at 12 minimum wages per year, e.g. you pay a maximum of 2280 RON as CASS contribution in 2018 if you earn over RON 22,800 for the whole year + 10% income tax) | 10% | | | | 19% (standard); 9% (food, medicines, books, newspapers and hotel services); 5% (reduced) | Taxation in Romania |
| Russia | 20% | 13% | 22% (earning over 50 million roubles a year) 35% (non-residents) | | | | 0% | 22% (standard); 10% (books, certain items of food and children goods); 0% (house or flat) | Taxation in Russia |
| Rwanda | 30% | 0% | 30% | | | | | 18% | Taxation in Rwanda |
| Saint Kitts and Nevis | 33% | 0% | | | | | | —N/a | Taxation in Saint Kitts and Nevis |
| Saint Barthélemy | 0% | 0% | 0% | | | | | 0% | Taxation in Saint Barthélémy |
| Saint Lucia | 30% | —N/a | —N/a | | | | | —N/a | Taxation in Saint Lucia |
| Saint Martin | 20% (10% for small taxpayer, those with revenue in a given tax year not exceeding the equivalent of €40,000) | —N/a | —N/a | | | | | —N/a | Taxation in Saint Martin |
| Saint Pierre and Miquelon | 33.3% (15% for small taxpayer, those with revenue in a given tax year not exceeding the equivalent of €600,000) | —N/a | —N/a | | | | | —N/a | Taxation in Saint Pierre and Miquelon |
| Saint Vincent and the Grenadines | 30% | —N/a | —N/a | | | | | —N/a | Taxation in Saint Vincent and the Grenadines |
| Samoa | 27% | —N/a | —N/a | | | | | —N/a | Taxation in Samoa |
| San Marino | 17% | 9% | 35% | | | | | 0% (standard); 17% (imported goods) | Taxation in San Marino |
| São Tomé and Príncipe | 25% | —N/a | —N/a | | | | | —N/a | Taxation in São Tomé and Príncipe |
| Sark | 0% | 0% | 0% | 0% | There are taxes on property and personal capital, maximum at £6,500. | | Document duty charged on real estate transfers from estates performed by a Guernsey Advocate. | 0% | Taxation in Sark |
| Saudi Arabia | 2.5% (fully Saudi national owned businesses) 2.5–15% (taxed at Zakat rate 2.5% for the Saudi percentage of ownership, 15% for all other ownership) | 0% | | | | | | 15% (standard) 5% (real estate transactions rate) | Taxation in Saudi Arabia |
| Senegal | 25% | 0% | 50% | | | | | 20% | Taxation in Senegal |
| Serbia | 15% | 10% | 25% (additional contributions for state health, pension and unemployment funds) | 15% | | | 0% | 20% (standard); 10% or 0% (reduced rates) | Taxation in Serbia |
| Seychelles | 33% | 15% | | | | | | 15% | Taxation in the Seychelles |
| Sierra Leone | 25% | —N/a | —N/a | | | | | —N/a | Taxation in Sierra Leone |
| Singapore | 17% | 0% | 22% (+20% tax on pension) | | | | 0% | 9% | Taxation in Singapore |
| Sint Maarten | 34.5% | 12.50% | 47.50% | | | | | 5% | Taxation in Sint Maarten |
| Slovakia | 21% (over €100,000); 15% (under €100,000) | 21% | 25% | 25% | No | | 0% | 23% (standard); 19% (electricity, non-basic foodstuffs, selected catering services); 5% (basic foodstuffs, books, medicines, accommodation services) | Taxation in Slovakia |
| Slovenia | 19% | 16% | 50% | 27.5% | No | | 0% | 22% (standard)9.5% (food, building and renovation, transport, tickets, media) 5% (books, newspaper) | Taxation in Slovenia |
| Solomon Islands | 30% | —N/a | —N/a | | | | | —N/a | Taxation in the Solomon Islands |
| Somalia | 30% | 0% | 18% | | | | | 0% | Taxation in Somalia |
| South Africa | 28% | 0% (below threshold) | 45% | 18% | | | 25% | 15% | Taxation in South Africa |
| South Georgia and the South Sandwich Islands | —N/a | 7% | | —N/a | —N/a | —N/a | —N/a | —N/a | Taxation in South Georgia and the South Sandwich Islands |
| South Korea | 24.2% | 7.8% (6% + 1.8%) | 53.4% (42% + 11.4%) | | No | | 50% | 10% | Taxation in South Korea |
| South Sudan | 30% | —N/a | —N/a | | | | | —N/a | Taxation in South Sudan |
| Spain | 25% (mainland); 4% (Canary Islands) | 0% (first €5,550 per year is tax free) | 52.3% 47% (State tax) 3.75% (Regional tax in Valencia) 6.45% (Social security, worker contribution) | 26% (residents); 19% (non-residents) | Yes | | 34% | 21% (standard); 10% or 4% (reduced rates) | Taxation in Spain |
| Sri Lanka | 15–30% | 0% | 36% (if annual income is more than LKR 3 million) | 10% | | | | 12% (standard); 8% or 0% (reduced rates) | Taxation in Sri Lanka |
| Sudan | 5% (special exempt companies) 15% (most other companies) | | | | | | | | Taxation in Sudan |
| Suriname | 36% | 8% (first SRD2,646 per year is deductible) | 38% | | | | | —N/a | Taxation in Suriname |
| Svalbard | 16% | 8% | 22% | 0% | | | 0% | 0% | Taxation in Norway |
| Sweden | 20.6% | 7.1% (first 25,100 SEK per year is deductible) | 48% to 54% (depending on municipality) | 30% | No | | 0% | 25% (standard); 12% or 6% (reduced rates) | Taxation in Sweden |
| Switzerland | 17.92% | 0% | 62.855% 10.6%(mandatory social security contributions); 11.5% (federal); 28.025% (cantonal, Geneva); 9.69% (communal, Avully and Chancy, both canton of Geneva); 3.04% (church tax, roman catholic and protestant in Geneva) | | Yes | | 0% | 8.1% (standard); 3.8% or 2.5% (reduced rates) | Taxation in Switzerland |
| Syria | 22% | 5% | 15% | | | | | —N/a | Taxation in Syria |
| Taiwan | 20% | 5% | 40% | | | | 20% | 5% | Taxation in Taiwan |
| Tajikistan | 13% (residents); 25% (non-residents) | 5% | 13% (residents); 25% (non-residents) | | | | | 18% | Taxation in Tajikistan |
| Tanzania | 30% | 15% | 30% | | | | | 14% | Taxation in Tanzania |
| Thailand | 20% | 0% | 35% | | | | | 7% | Taxation in Thailand |
| Togo | 27% | —N/a | —N/a | | | | | —N/a | Taxation in Togo |
| Tokelau | 0% | —N/a | —N/a | | | | | —N/a | Taxation in Tokelau |
| Tonga | 25% | —N/a | —N/a | | | | | —N/a | Taxation in Tonga |
| Trinidad and Tobago | 30% | 0% (personal allowance of $90,000 per year) | 25% (annual chargeable income less than $1 million), 30% (annual chargeable income over $1 million) | | n/a | | n/a | 12.5% (VAT) | Taxation in Trinidad & Tobago |
| Tunisia | 30% | 0% | 35% | | | | | 18% (standard); 12% or 6% (reduced rates) | Taxation in Tunisia |
| Turkey | 25% | 15% | 40% | | No | | 1–30% | 20% (standard); 10% (clothing); 1% (certain food items) | Taxation in Turkey |
| Turkmenistan | 8% | —N/a | —N/a | | | | | —N/a | Taxation in Turkmenistan |
| Turks and Caicos Islands | 0% | —N/a | —N/a | | | | | —N/a | Taxation in the Turks and Caicos Islands |
| Tuvalu | 30% | —N/a | —N/a | | | | | —N/a | Taxation in Tuvalu |
| Uganda | 30% | —N/a | —N/a | | | | | 18% | Taxation in Uganda |
| Ukraine | 18% | 0% | 18% (common rate); 20% (some activities); 22% (social security) | | | | 18% | 2% (non-refundable turnover tax during martial law) | Taxation in Ukraine |
| United Arab Emirates | 0% (free zone companies, as well as mainland companies with less than 375,000 AED a year in profit, may need to fill out a tax return) 9% (for mainland companies with a net profit over AED 375,000 annually, taxation paid to other countries credited towards UAE taxation, tax return required) | 0% | | 0% | | | | 5% | Taxation in the United Arab Emirates |
| United Kingdom | 19–25% | 0% (up to £12,570) | 47% (45% + 2% employee National Insurance, Scotland is even 48%+2%) | 24% | No | | 40% | 20% (standard); 5% (home energy and renovations); 0% (life necessities, public transport, children's clothing, books and periodicals) | Taxation in the United Kingdom |
| United States | 21% (federal) up to 21% (with credit of tax paid towards other countries) | 10% (federal) + 0–3.07% (state) + 0–3.735% (local) (federal standard deduction of 16100 USD for single taxpayers) | 51.776% New York City (37% (federal) + 10.9% (state)) + 3.876% (city)) 37% Nine states with no state income tax (37% + 0%) | 20% | No | 0–3.64% | 18–40% (federal with offset against individual State Estate and Inheritance Taxes) | 0–11.5% | Taxation in the United States |
| Uruguay | 25% | 0% | 36% | | | | | 22% (standard); 11% (lowest); 0% (extent) | Taxation in Uruguay |
| Uzbekistan | 12% (standard); 20% (banks and mobile communication operators) | 12% | | | | | | 0–15% | Taxation in Uzbekistan |
| Vanuatu | 0% | 0% | 0% | | | | | 15% | Taxation in Vanuatu |
| Venezuela | 34% | 0% | 34% | | | | | 16% (standard); 8% (reduced) | Taxation in Venezuela |
| Vietnam | 20% | 5% | 35% | | | | 10% | 10% | Taxation in Vietnam |
| British Virgin Islands | 0% | 0% | | | | | | —N/a | Taxation in the British Virgin Islands |
| U.S. Virgin Islands | 21–38.50% | | | | | | | | Taxation in the United States Virgin Islands |
| Wallis and Futuna | 0% | 0% | 0% | | | | | 0% | Taxation in Wallis and Futuna |
| Yemen | 20% | 10% | 15% | | | | | 2% | Taxation in Yemen |
| Zambia | 30% | 10% | 30% | | | | | 16% | Taxation in Zambia |
| Zimbabwe | 25% | 0% | 45% | | | | | 15% (standard); 0% (on selected items) | Taxation in Zimbabwe |

== See also ==
- Corporate haven
- List of countries by social welfare spending
- List of countries by tax revenue
- Tax Freedom Day
- Tax haven
- Tax rates in Europe
- VAT rates around the world
- Welfare state
