= Taxation in Georgia =

Taxation in Georgia may refer to:

- Taxation in Georgia (country)
- Taxation in Georgia (U.S. state)
