= Taxation in Bermuda =

Bermuda is considered a tax haven; however, Bermuda does levy a number of taxes, such as a payroll tax on employers and land taxes. The corporate tax rate is 15% for multinational companies with revenues greater than $750 million, and a company is considered a tax resident of Bermuda if it is incorporated in the country. Bermuda has not entered into any double tax agreements.

== Payroll tax ==
Payroll tax is payable by employee, employers and self-employed persons at progressive rates on total remuneration paid, up to a maximum of $900,000 of remuneration per annum per person. Employers may withhold from an employee's salary a progressive rate starting at 1.5% up to 9.5% of the amounts paid to an employee.

Payroll tax payable is based on the size of an employer's annual payroll and the income of individual employees. Revenue from payroll tax in 2021/22 was $447.7 million.

== Customs duties ==
Customs duties in Bermuda are levied on almost all goods arriving in the island. Import tax is quite heavy in Bermuda. Almost everything in Bermuda is imported including food. Consequently, prices are high in Bermuda and the cost of living in Bermuda is far higher than many other countries, and is a major source of government revenue. In 2021/22 fiscal year, government revenues were $998.9 million, of which custom duties were $200.6 million.

== Land tax ==
A land tax is payable on land owned or rented. Non-Bermudians can buy only top-end properties and at a price far higher than what a Bermudian would pay, and usually cost in millions.

The tax amount is based on an annual rental value (ARV) of the property and has 6 bands or tiers. In the lowest band which is up to an ARV of $11,000, the land tax is 0.8%. For the highest band, of ARV over $120,000, the land tax is 47%. Revenue from land tax in 2021/22 was $78.8 million.

== Licence fees ==
Companies incorporated in Bermuda are either local companies or exempted companies. Local companies must be at least 60% owned by Bermudians and directors must be Bermudians. Exempted companies can be entirely owned by non-Bermudians and are exempt from exchange controls. Bermuda companies do not pay tax on income or capital gains, and there is no branch profits tax in Bermuda.

All companies pay an annual company fee, based on share capital levels. For exempted companies the fees vary between $1,995 and $31,120; and for local companies the fees are lower.

Where an exempted company manages a unit trust scheme, the fee is $2,905 in respect of each unit trust scheme managed by the company.

Exempted companies that wish to establish a place of business in Bermuda require a permit and are subject to the annual company fee indicated above. Where the company's principal business is raising money from the public by the issue of bonds or other securities or insurance business or open-ended mutual fund business, the fee is $4,125.

Revenue from fees from exempted companies in 2021/22 was $69.4 million.

== Stamp duty ==
Stamp duty in Bermuda is applicable on legal instruments, such as property deeds, affidavit of property, agreement, bonds, etc. The rate of stamp duty varies for various instruments. Revenue from stamp duties in 2021/22 was $124 million.

== Income taxes ==
- Corporate income tax - Nil.
- Income tax - Nil.

== Other income ==
- Taxation of investment income and capital gains - not taxed.
- Dividends, interest, and rental income - not taxed; and there is no withholding tax on such payments.
- Gains from employee stock option exercises - stock option gains are subject to the payroll tax. Capital gain on disposition of shares not taxed.
- Foreign exchange gains and losses - not taxed.
- Principal residence gains and losses - not taxed.
- Capital losses - not applicable.
- Foreign property reporting - not taxed.
- Non-resident trusts - not taxed.

== See also ==
- Economy of Bermuda
- List of countries by tax rates
