= Taxation in Greenland =

Taxation in Greenland has differed from the taxes in Denmark since the grant of home rule in 1979. The tax system is relatively simple, based on a flat-rate taxation of labor income and certain capital income.

== Income taxation ==
All citizens of Greenland are subject to personal taxation on the basis of full or limited tax liability. The government tax rate is up to 44%, depending on the municipality of taxation. There are some tax deductions in Greenland. A deduction for foreign workers also exists, and this deduction can be as high as 35%. Deductions are also available to students and parents.

Fully tax liable individuals and individuals with limited tax liability from employment and employment related income are entitled to an allowance of DKK 48,000 a year (2016 amount). Persons with full tax liability to Greenland are further entitled to an extra allowance of DKK 10,000 a year (2016 amount). The amounts can be subject to adjustment every year, but have been stable for a number of years.

== VAT and business taxes ==
Greenland is one of the very few areas in the world that do not charge value-added tax (VAT). This means that citizens of Greenland and who purchase goods outside Greenland—and taking or sending goods to Greenland—have the opportunity to get VAT refunded.

== Tax administration ==
Citizens subject to taxation use the calendar year as the income tax/fiscal year. Permission can be granted to use a 12-month period other than the calendar year, provided that the period starts on the first day of a calendar month. Generally, the income period for companies follows the accounting year, which has to be no longer than 12 months. However, the first accounting year can vary from 6 to 18 months.
