= Taxation in Belgium =

Taxation in Belgium consists of taxes that are collected on both state and local level. The most important taxes are collected on federal level, these taxes include an income tax, social security, corporate taxes and value added tax. At the local level, property taxes as well as communal taxes are collected. Tax revenue stood at 48% of GDP in 2012.

The amount of taxes a person in Belgium has to pay depends on whether you are or you are not a resident of the country. For a resident (a person whose work or family home is in Belgium) it is clear. But in the case of non-resident, there are two scenarios. If you are non-resident who lives in Belgium for at least six months of the year (183 days) and you are registered with your local commune, you are classified as resident. It means you are taxed by Belgium income tax on your worldwide income. But if you are a non-resident who lives in Belgium for fewer than 6 months (183 days) during the year, you have to pay Belgium income tax only on income you earned in Belgium (including rents and capital gains).

The tax topics and laws are managed by government through the Ministry of Finance. The power to levy taxes has only the parliament. After the law is signed by the king, it is published in the official gazette.

The effective taxation rate in Belgium is commonly cited as among the highest in the world; see list of countries by tax rates.

== Income taxation ==
=== Filing taxes ===
The Belgian tax year for personal income runs from 1 January to 31 December. Both, residents of Belgium as well as non-residents who pay tax on their income (as mentioned above), have to file an annual Belgian tax return. A tax return associated with your income in previous year is generally delivered in May or June. Typically, it has to be returned by the end of June (exact date can be found on the particular tax return). In case you don't submit your return by the deadline, you will receive a fine. Moreover, tax authorities can determine the amount of tax you have to pay.

As regards regular income tax payments, it is quite simple. If you are employed, your employer will regularly (every month) deduct your income tax payment from your salary. With self-employed workers or paid company directors, the process is similar – tax is paid in advance on monthly basis through collecting agency or bank. In Belgium, it is also possible to pay taxes via post or online (using Belgian government's tax portal). For non-residents with Belgian-earned income, it is a bit more complicated. A tax return is delivered as soon as they inform competent tax collectors office. On the other hand, they can also pay with the use of post or online.

=== Income tax rates ===
Income tax is calculated by applying a progressive tax rate schedule to taxable income, with rates that go from 25% to a maximum rate 50%. The rates, as of 2015, were as follows:

Annual income	Tax rate	
From 0 to €10,860	25%	€2,715
From €10,860 to €12,470	30%	€483 (€3,198 aggregate)
From €12,470 to €20,780	40%	€3,324 (€6,522 aggregate)
From €20,780 to €38,080	45%	€7,785 (€14,307 aggregate)
In excess of €38,080	50%	

From 2019, the rates have changed, with the 30% rate eliminated. An exemption of €10,570 is applied before tax is imposed. That tax-free allowance can increase under certain circumstances, f.ex. when the taxpayer has dependent children. As of 2025, the rates are as follows:

Annual taxable income	Tax rate	
From €0 to €15,820	25%	€3,955
From €15,820 to €27,920	40%	€4,840
From €27,920 to €48,320	45%	€9,180
In excess of €48,320	50%	

Communes/municipalities also can levy a surcharge on income tax that varies from 2.5% to 9.0%, with most municipalities assessing at a rate of 6-8%. This is paid along with income tax.

Employment income is also subject to social security contributions. Employee contributions are 13.07% and are deducted by the employer. In addition, the employer contributes about 35% of employee's wage. No ceiling for contributions apply on contributions for either employee and employer.

=== Deductions from income tax ===
Furthermore, a long list of tax allowances can be deducted from both the employer and the employee, including a general deduction, benefits deduction, and a deduction for dependents. Tax deductions are granted according to the following table:

Examples of some benefits
Benefit Type	Employee Deduction	Employer Deduction
Child	---	7%
Unemployment	0.87%	1.46%
Medical Care/Sickness	1.15%	2.35%
Occupational Illness	---	1%
Industrial Accidents	---	0.3%

== Business taxation ==
In Belgium, there are many taxes connected with business such as corporate income tax (more specified in the Income Tax Code), payroll taxes on remuneration paid to employees and directors, VAT, transfer tax, insurance premium tax. Occasionally, certain regional or local taxes might appear, depending on the area where the firm operates.

Taxes also differ depending on the fact whether a certain company is resident or nonresident. In the case of resident company, corporate income tax is levied on company's capital gains, worldwide profits and income. Non-resident companies have to pay tax on Belgian-sourced income.

The standard corporate tax rate is 25%. Small companies meeting stringent conditions are sometimes eligible for a reduced 20% rate on up to 100000€ in taxable revenue.

According to Deloitte study Taxation and Investment in Belgium 2017, taxable income can be defined this way: “The taxable income of resident company comprises its annual worldwide income, less allowable deductions. Income derived by a resident company from foreign real estate or branches located in countries with which Belgium has concluded a tax treaty is exempt. Although subsidies are, in principle, part of taxable income, certain job creation subsidies, capital grants and interest rate subsidies are exempt for corporate income tax purposes.” However, during the process of calculating taxable income, companies can deduct all business expenses that can be considered as legitimate and arm's length. Expenses that can be taken as deductions are for example royalties, fees, investments, employer-funded pension contributions, some of the employee benefits and in some cases also interest paid on loans.

By selling tangible and intangible fixed assets company generates capital gains that are usually taxed at the standard 25% corporate tax rate. "However, taxation of capital gains on such assets can be deferred if the assets were held for more than five years before the disposal and the entire sale reinvestment, the tax due will be spread over the life of the asset in which the sale proceeds have been reinvested." And further: "Capital gains from fixed income securities are taxed as profits. However, gains derived from shareholdings in other companies are exempt if: (i) the shares meet the „subject to tax“ requirement for application of the dividends received deduction; and (ii) the shares have been held in full ownership for an uninterrupted period o fat least one year."

Belgium Tax Facts for Companies
Corporate income tax rate	25% (20% for eligible SME's)
Fairness tax	5%
Secret commissions tax	50%/100%
Branch tax rate	25% (20% for eligible SME's)

== Indirect taxes ==
Value added tax (VAT) is a consumption tax “placed on a product whenever value is added at each stage of the supply chain, from production to the point of sale. The amount of VAT that the user pays is on the cost of the product, less any of the costs of materials used in the product that have already been taxed.” VAT is not levied on exports and the standard VAT rate is 21%. But for certain cases, the rates might be a bit different – 0% rate in case of daily and weekly publications and certain recycled goods, 6% rate applies to most basic goods (water, food,...), 12% rate is associated with social housing and restaurant services. A value added tax return is obliged to be filed monthly or quarterly. As regards the payments, typically, tax due must be paid at the time VAT return is being filed and sometimes advance payments may be required. The Belgian VAT is part of the European Union value added tax system. Most smaller businesses with a turnover lower than €25000 can request an exemption as of 01/01/2016.

There is transfer tax in Belgium.

In case of capital tax, there is only a fixed fee 50 EUR.

In Belgium, there are also some environmental taxes associated mainly with energy usage.
