= Taxation in Zambia =

In Zambia, the Zambia Revenue Authority, a body under the Ministry of Finance, is in charge of collecting taxes on behalf of the Zambian Government.

Income in Zambia is taxed on the source principle or deemed source basis in some instances. Residents are taxed on domestic source of income and certain types of foreign income, non-residents are normally taxed on Zambian source of income. Zambia has the following direct taxes: Company Income Tax, Personal Income Tax, Withholding Tax, Presumptive Tax and Property Transfer Tax.

== Corporate Income ==
- Company Income Tax

The general rate is 35 percent for both resident and non-resident companies. For companies involved in agriculture, manufacture of chemical fertilizer and non-traditional exports, the rate is 15 percent while that for mining is 30 percent and 40 percent on bank profits above K250 million

Reduced Rates and Suspension of Corporate Income Tax on profits from manufacturing of ceramic products. The table below gives a breakdown of the 2022 tax rates.

Breakdown of Tax Reformation 2022 - 2023
	Tax Rate 2023	Tax Rate 2022	Prev. Rate	Notes
Standard Corporate Income Tax Rate	30.0%	▼30.0%	35.0%	
Telecoms Companies	▼35.0%	40.0%	40.0%	2022: Rate with income exceeding ZMW 250,000. 2023: Plan to abolish two-tier taxation system in sector.
Manufacture of Ceramic Products	0.0%	0.0%	N/A	Suspended for the 2022 and 2023 Charge years
Gemstone Industry Value Addition: Lapidary and Jewellery facilities	▼25.0%	▼30.0%	35.0%	
Land based (brick and mortar) betting companies presumptive tax	▼15.0%	25.0%	25.0%	
Corn Starch Agro Processor				Operating in Multi-Facility Economic Zone (MFEZ), Industrial Park and Rural Area. Corporate Income Tax to be graduated from 2023 to 2038 Withholding Tax on dividends to be waived from 2023 to 2033

Additional Breakdown of Tax Reformation 2022 - 2023
	Rate 2023	Rate 2022	Prev. Rate	Note
Public Private Partnership (PPP) Wear and Tear Allowance	▲100%			on Implements, Plant and Machinery to be specifically used on a PPP Project
Rental Income and Turnover Tax	▼0.0%			on first ZMW 12,000 (annually) Balance at applicable tax rate
Farm Improvement Allowance	▲ZMW 100,000	ZMW 20,000		Allowable Deduction on construction cost of employee housing

Reintroduction of tax incentives for companies operating Multi Facility Economic Zone (MFEZ) or Industrial Parks. The table below gives a breakdown of the Incentives

2022 Budget Incentive
Category	Notes
Dividend Withholding Tax Relief	0% for a period of 10 years starting from the year of commencement of operations on profits derived from exports.
Corporate Income Tax for companies operating in a MFEZ or Industrial Park will be charged at the following rates on profits derived from exports	0% for a period of 10 years from first year of commencement of works
Corporate Income Tax for companies operating in a MFEZ or Industrial Park will be charged at the following rates on profits derived from exports	50% or profits taxed from 11th to 15th year
Corporate Income Tax for companies operating in a MFEZ or Industrial Park will be charged at the following rates on profits derived from exports	75% of profits taxed from 14th to 15th year

== Mineral Royalty ==
In 2022, for Mining Companies, the deductibility of mineral royalty for corporate income tax assessment purposes was reintroduced.

Mineral Royalty Tax Regime with respect to Copper 2023 Onward
Price Range	Taxable Amount	Rate %
Less than US$4,000 per tonne	The first US$4,000	4.0
US$4,001 per tonne up to US$5,000 per tonne	The next US$1,000	6.5
US$5,001 per tonne up to US$7,000 per tonne	The next US$2,000	8.5
US$7,001 per tonne or more	The Balance	10

== Import Taxes on Mining Equipment and Machinery ==
In September 2022, under Statutory Instrument (SI) No. 50 of 2022, the government offered additional tax exemptions by suspending import taxes on mining equipment and machinery.

== Personal Income Tax ==
- Personal Income Tax

All individuals are liable to tax on personal income after deducting personal relief at a graduated rate from 0 percent for incomes of K39600 per Annum (K3300 per month) and below. The rest at rates of 25 percent, 30 percent and 37.5 percent.

Changes were made to the PAYE tax brackets. The below table shows the breakdown.

Pay As You Earn 2022
Current Income Band (ZMW)	Tax Rate % 2022	Prev. Income Band (ZMW)	Tax Rate % Prev.
0 - 4,500	0	0 - 4,000	0
4,501 - 4,800	25	4,001 - 4,800	25
4,801 - 6,900	30	4,801 - 6,900	30
Above 6,900	37.5	Above 6,900	37.5

Pay As You Earn 2023
Upcoming Income Band (ZMW)	Tax Rate % 2023 -	Prev. Income Band (ZMW)	Tax Rate % Prev.
0 - 4,800	0	0 - 4,500	0
4,801 - 6,800	▼20	4,501 - 4,800	25
6,801 - 8,900	30	4,801 - 6,900	30
Above 8,900	37.5	Above 6,900	37.5

Pay As You Earn 2024 Onward
Upcoming Income Band (ZMW)	Tax Rate % 2023 -	Prev. Income Band (ZMW)	Tax Rate % Prev.
0 - 5,100	0	0 - 4,800	0
5,101 - 7,100	20	4,801 - 6,800	20
7,101 - 9,200	30	6,801 - 8,900	30
Above 9,200	▼37	Above 8,900	37.5

== Turnover Tax ==
- Turnover Tax

The rate of 5 percent (from Jan 2025) is charged on business income for small scale businesses below a turnover threshold of K5 million per annum

- Property Transfer Tax

This is charged at the rate of 5 percent of the open market value realised from the sale of any land and building and shares issued by a company incorporated in Zambia.

Tax Reformation 2022 - 2023
	Rate 2023	Rate 2022	Prev. Rate	Notes
Transfer of Mineral Rights	▼7.5%	10.0%	10.0%	Held by Exploration Companies
Transfer of Land, Shares and Intellectual Property	▲7.5%	5.0%	5.0%	
Share in Mining Right and an Interest in Mineral Processing License	Golden			
Forfeiture or Surrender of Shares	▼0.0%	5.0%	5.0%	Exempt from PPT
Disposal of a Distressed Property by a Financial Services Provider	Realized Value			Realized Value to be the Actual Price Received

== Withholding Tax ==
- Withholding Tax

Withholding tax of 10 percent on rental income (final tax) and 20 percent on dividends, interest payments, royalties, commissions, management and consultancy fees and payments to subcontractors. Payments made to non-residents are also subject to withholding tax at 20 percent in all cases except where there is a double taxation agreement in effect Zambia also charges Indirect taxes: Import Duty, Excise Duty and VAT (Value Added Tax). VAT rate is at 16%, with some items being exempted or zero-rated. The table below gives a breakdown of the Withholding Tax rate reforms.

Tax Reformation 2022 - 2023
	Rate 2023	Rate 2022	Prev. Rate	Notes
Withholding tax on interest earned by individuals from loans advanced by members under the savings groups such as co-operatives and village banking.	▼0.0%	15.0%	15.0%	
Withholding tax on investment income on life insurance funds	▼0.0%	15.0%	15.0%	
Withholding tax interest income earned on green bonds listed on the securities exchange in Zambia with maturity of at least 3 years	▼0.0%	20.0%	20.0%	
Withholding tax on re-insurance including retrocession	▼0.0%	20.0%	20.0%	
Withholding tax on winnings from gaming and betting	▼15.0%	20.0%	20.0%	

== Value Added Tax ==
Value Added Tax on Goods and Services is rated at 16% unless otherwise specified.

In September 2022, the UPND government reinstated Diesel and Petrol VAT rate.

The table below gives a breakdown of the VAT rate reforms.

Tax Reformation 2022 - 2023
	Rate 2023	Rate 2022	Prev. Rate	Notes
Select ICT and Telecommunications Equipment	▼0.0%	16.0%	16.0%	
Supply of Milk Cans, Churns and Milking Machines	▼0.0%	16.0%	16.0%	
Gaming, Betting and Lotteries	▼0.0%	16.0%	16.0%	
Imports of Game Animals (Breeding Stock)	▼0.0%	16.0%	16.0%	
Public Private Partnership (PPP) Projects Imported Machinery	▼0.0%			VAT relief where duty is waived under the customs and excise regulations
Public Private Partnership (PPP) Projects Special Purpose Vehicle (SPV)	Claim			Input VAT for first four (4) years

== Customs and Excise ==
In September 2022, the UPND government reinstated Diesel and Petrol excise duty. In December 2022, the government amended the customs duty rate in Chapter 27 of the Customs and Excise Act Cap 322 from 25% to free rate (0%). This applied to importation of petrol and low Sulphur gas oil and came into effect on 1 January 2023.

The table below gives a breakdown of the Custom and excise rate reforms.

Tax Reformation 2022 - 2023
	Rate 2023	Rate 2022	Prev. Rate	Notes
Tourism: Customs Duty on Importation of Safari Vehicles	▼0.0%	▼0.0%		Suspended till 31 December 2025
Tourism: Customs Duty on Select Imported Capital Equipment, Machinery, Fittings and Fixtures	▼0.0%			Suspended till 31 December 2025
Agriculture: Customs Duty on Biological Agents	▼0.0%	5.0%	5.0%	Removed
Agriculture: Customs Duty on Greenhouse Plastics	▼0.0%			Suspended till 31 December 2025
Agriculture: Customs Duty on Machinery, Equipment and Articles used in Aquaculture	▼0.0%			Suspended till 31 December 2025
Agriculture: Customs Duty on Vegetable Seedling Growing Media, Peat Moss	▼0.0%			Removed
Agriculture: Customs Duty on Select Tree Crop Seedlings	▼0.0%	5.0%	5.0%	Removed
Customs duty on gas cylinders for liquefied petroleum gas	▼0.0%	15.0%	15.0%	
Customs duty on electric vehicles	▼15.0%	30.0%	30.0%	
Customs duty on electric motorbikes	▼15.0%	25.0%	25.0%	
Customs duty on bicycles	▼15.0%	25.0%	25.0%	
Construction and Infrastructure: Customs duty on Plant, Machinery and Equipment for PPP	▼0.0%			Removed
Construction and Infrastructure: Customs duty on Pre-Fabricated Buildings	▼0.0%	25.0%	25.0%	
ICT and Telecommunications Equipment	▼0.0%	25.0%		Suspended till 31 December 2025
Financial Services: Automated Teller Machines (ATMs)	▼0.0%	15.0%		Suspended till 31 December 2023

== See also ==
- Economy of Zambia
- Bank of Zambia
- Zambian Kwacha
