= Taxation in the Czech Republic =

The tax system of the Czech Republic is similar in its main features to the systems of developed and especially European countries.

Czech Republic's current tax system was put into administration on 1 January 1993. Since then, an updated VAT act was introduced on 1 May 2004 when Czech Republic joined the EU and the act had to correspond to EU law. In 2008, the administration also introduced Energy Taxation. Changes to tax laws are quite frequent and common in the Czech Republic due to a dynamic economy. The highest levels of revenue are generated from income tax, social security contributions, value-added tax and corporate tax. In 2015, total revenue stood at CZK 670.216 billion which was 36.3% of GDP. The tax quota of the Czech Republic is lower than the EU average. Compared to the averages of the OECD countries, revenues generated from taxes on social security contributions, corporate income and gains and value added taxes account for higher proportions of total taxation revenue. Personal income tax lies on the other end of the spectrum where the revenue is proportionally much lower than the OECD average. Taxes on property also account for lower levels of revenue.

== Tax system structure and Tax Rates ==
The Czech tax system consists of direct and indirect taxes. Direct taxes include income tax (both corporate and personal), road tax, real estate and real estate transfer tax, inheritance tax and gift tax. In between indirect taxes belong value added tax (VAT), duties, ecotaxes and excise taxes. Tax revenues come roughly equally from indirect and direct taxes.

Tax system structure in Czech Republic (2024)

Czech tax system	Direct Taxes	Direct pension taxes: Personal Income Tax; Corporate Income Tax
Czech tax system	Direct Taxes	Direct property taxes: Real Estate Tax; Road Tax
Czech tax system	Direct Taxes	Gambling Tax
Czech tax system	Indirect Taxes	Value Added Tax
Czech tax system	Indirect Taxes	Ecological Tax: Tax on natural gas and certain other fuels; Tax on solid fuels; Tax on electricity
Czech tax system	Indirect Taxes	Excise Tax: Tax on mineral oils; Tax on alcohol; Tax on beer; Tax on wine and intermediate products; Tax on raw tobacco; Tax on heated tobacco products; Tax on other tobacco products; Tax on tobacco-related products

=== Indirect Taxes ===
==== Value Added Tax ====
The sale of goods, provision of services and imports is taxed using the VAT just like in all EU countries. There are three VAT rates in the Czech Republic with the standard rate at 21%. This rate is applied to all goods and services which are not listed on a special roster for reduced taxes. The First reduced rate is 15% and is applied on the things listed on Annex 3 to the Law No. 235/2004 Collection. Examples of goods taxed by 15% are grocery and non-alcoholic beverages, plants and animals, music notes, books and some drugs. The second reduced rate is 10%. Under this tax falls for example baby food and radiopharmaceuticals. In the case of imported goods the standard rate is usually used, when at least one type of good fits into Harmonized description and number labeling system and when there is a uniform duty rate. The exception is when the goods value is lower than 22 EUR, than it is exempted from tax - according to § 71, Law No. 235/2004 Coll.

The reduced VAT rate from 2024 is now unified at 12%. Some products and services are cheaper (food purchases, construction work orders, medical supplies, pet food and funeral services), while other categories are more expensive from the original VAT rate of 10% (medicines, infant formula, heat and water supplies, accommodation services, public transport, catering services, purchases of newspapers, magazines and tickets for cultural and sporting events).

VAT rates (2024)

Type of rate	Rate	Goods
Standard rate	21 %	most goods and services
Reduced rate	12 %	food, some medical supplies, public transport, etc.
Zero rate	0 %	book sales, postal services, financial insurance services, health and social care, broadcasting and education

==== Excise Tax ====
Objects of the excise tax in the Czech Republic are engine oils, alcoholic beverages as wine and beer and other distillates and tobacco products. The excise tax is a fixed amount per the label of good with the exception of cigarettes where the amount taxed is calculated as the fixed amount plus proportional amount of the final retail price. The difference between excise tax and VAT is that VAT is imposed on every good while excise tax is imposed just on goods that are harmful for our health, morally hazardous or are harmful or costly for society. Another name for this tax is a "sin tax". From excise tax are exempted tobacco products destined for test of quality and samples taken by customs office.

The excise tax is collected by selling stamps. These stamps are used for marking alcohol and cigarettes and it's forbidden to sell it without these stamps.

The reason for the introduction of excise tax is to regulate the prices of certain commodities in an attempt to increase state budget revenues or to reduce the quantity of goods sold, the consumption of which is harmful to health.

Since 2004, excise tax has been administered by the Customs authorities, whereas previously they were administered by the Tax office.

==== Ecotaxes ====
Ecotaxes were accepted as a part of Czech law system on 1 January 2008 as a consequence of being a part of the EU. They are modified in the law no. 261/2007 Coll. (Slightly changed on 1 October 2013 by the law No. 169/2013 Coll.) Types of ecotaxes in the Czech Republic are air protection (air pollution fee), water protection (fee for the discharge of wastewater into surface water), protection of the rock environment, soil protection, and waste and packaging management (waste disposal fee). Objects of the ecotax are natural gas, black and brown coal, coke and other hydrocarbons peat and electricity.

One example of ecotax is registration fee for vehicles complying with lower European emission standards. The fee varies: free of charge for vehicles satisfying Euro 3, 4, 5 and 6; 3,000 CZK for vehicles satisfying Euro 2; 5,000 CZK for vehicles satisfying Euro 1. For vehicles that do not comply with any European emission standards the fee is 10,000 CZK – it is not often worth to pay it, so the vehicle is ecologically disposed of.

Energy Tax is another ecotax and it is imposed on natural gas and other gases, electricity and solid fuels. The tax is levied to the sellers of energy or the operators of distribution or transmission systems.

Ecological tax rates 2024

Object		Quantity	Tax
Electricity		1 MWh	28,30 CZK
Natural gas	engine drive	1 MWh	264,80 CZK
Natural gas	heat production	1 MWh	30,60 CZK
Solid fuels		1 GJ	8,50 CZK

The energy tax base is expressed as the amount of product consumed in units of energy.

To determine the energy content, the heat of combustion has been chosen, which is determined by a laboratory test. This applies to solid and gaseous fuels. For electricity, the amount of heat is expressed in MWh.

=== Direct taxes ===
==== Corporate Income Tax ====
Corporate income tax is paid by all legal entities, i.e. companies and commercial companies, such as limited liability companies or joint stock companies, but also by non-profit organisations - on income that is subject to taxation (some income of non-profits is exempt from tax).

Legal Entities residing in the Czech Republic need to pay corporate income tax on their worldwide income. Foreign companies are taxed on income that is sourced in Czech Republic only. The standard corporate tax rate is 21%. Investment funds have a special tax rate of 5% and for pension funds the rate is 0%. A 15% rate is levied on dividend income of Czech tax resident entities from non-resident entities.

Every corporate taxpayer can choose between straight-lined and accelerated depreciation of tangible assets. The depreciation period varies between three and fifty years, depending on the depreciation group.

==== Personal Income Tax ====
Individuals that are considered as tax residents in the Czech Republic are levied a flat personal income tax rate of 15% from gross income (used to be calculated from super-gross income which was cancelled in January 2021) and for individuals with yearly incomes exceeding 48 times the average monthly salary within the calendar year there is a solidarity surcharge of 7%. A progressive tax was introduced at the end of 2020 to replace the solidarity surcharge that had been in place since 2013. The progressive tax of 23% applies to personal income above the statutory limit, which has been set at 36 times the average monthly salary in 2024. Therefore, if an individual's income exceeds 36 times the average wage, they must pay 23% tax on this excess income instead of the basic 15% tax.

Own-account workers can apply a so-called lump sum tax, i.e. the amount of the levy is not calculated directly on their income. There are several flat-rate tax bands.

Non-tax residents are levied only for income sourced in Czech Republic. Taxable income includes income from employment, entrepreneurial income, capital (interest, dividends, etc.), rent and other forms of income.

==== Social Security contributions ====
In Czech Republic, all workers are liable to Czech social and health insurance payments. State social security system covers health care provisions; pensions, employment insurance and sickness pay as well as child-related benefits and other social services. Both employers and employees contribute to the social security system.

Social Security Contributions 2019

Insurance Policy	Employee	Employer
Pension Insurance fund	6.5%	21.5%
Sickness Insurance fund	0.0%	2.1%
Employment Insurance	0.0%	1.2%
Health Insurance	4.5%	9.0%
Total in %	11.0%	33.8%

Social Security Contributions 2024

Insurance Policy	Employee	Employer
Pension Insurance fund	6,5 %	21,5 %
Sickness Insurance fund	0,6 %	2,1 %
Employment Insurance	0,0 %	1,2 %
Health Insurance	4,5 %	9,0 %
Total in %	11,6 %	33,8 %

(does not apply to employers of paramedics or members of a fire brigade unit)

==== Real Estate Tax and Real Estate Acquisition Tax ====
Tax is levied on land as well as buildings and units. Real Estate Tax is paid annually, usually levied to the owner and in special instances to the lessee. The tax on buildings is based on the area of land occupied. The Building and unit tax ranges from CZK 2 to CZK 10 per square meter and in some cases can increase by 0.75 CZK per square meter with every floor exceeding 1/3 of the building built up area. The levy on agricultural land is 0.75% of its value. Other types of land are levied based on their area ranging from CZK 2 to CZK 5 per square meter for business activities and CZK 0.20 in other cases. Previously there was also an acquisition tax that was levied to the buyer at a flat rate of 4%. This was abolished as of 18 September 2020. Cms Law

However, there is still an obligation to pay tax on the sale of the property as this income is assessed under the Income Tax Act. The gain made on the sale of the property compared to its purchase price is then taxed.

==== Gift tax ====
Gift tax is transferred from free transfer of property (both movable and immovable). It is levied on a person who was given a property. The tax rates are based on the scheme where there are illustrated groups of kinship and on the size of property. There are several people exempt from the gift tax: wife/husband, relatives, and people who lived with the testator in one household for the duration of at least one year. Also, gifts from one person with total value less than 15,000 CZK given in the same tax period are exempt from this tax.

Gift tax no longer formally exists today, as it was abolished in 2014. Today, it falls under income tax and so is taxed as ordinary income. The rules for exempting this income from taxation are similar to the original gift tax. From 2024, the threshold below which this income is not taxed is 50,000 CZK.

==== Inheritance tax ====
The object of this tax is movable and immovable property inherited by law or by will. The taxpayer is the individual heir, who has acquired the inheritance thanks to the decision of the court.

The inheritance tax rate depends on the relationship to the deceased and the value of the inherited property. Heirs are divided into three groups depending on their relation with the deceased. First group is formed by the closest relatives—husband or wife, kids, grandchildren, parents and grandparents. Second group is formed by side-lined relatives (siblings, aunts and uncles, nieces and nephews and persons living together in household for more than one year. Third group is formed by persons without any kinship.

Inheritance tax was abolished in 2014, inheritance is now perceived as a gratuitous acquisition and is exempt from income tax.

==== Road Tax ====
Road Tax is a tax, that is supposed to be paid by everyone who uses his/her car or another vehicle, registered and operated at the territory of the Czech Republic, for a business purpose. Vehicles used exclusively for personal use are tax-exempt. It's one-off fee. The level of tax for personal vehicles is determined by the engine capacity, whereas for lorries by the maximum authorized weight per axle and the number of axles. Exceptions are so-called ecological cars (electric, gas,...) and some are totally exempted from the fee.

There is also a special fee for using the highways which is obligatory to pay for all the vehicles using highways which is since 2021 in electronic form. Electric, hybrid or hydrogen-based vehicles fully exempted from paying this fee. Vehicles powered by natural gases are partially exempted and pay lower fees (half of the original fee).

==== Gambling Tax ====
Since 2017, gambling operators or notifiers are obliged to pay gambling tax. It does not apply to gamblers whose potential winnings are taxed under the Income Tax Act. The tax covers games of chance such as lotteries, odds betting, sweepstakes, bingo, technical games, raffles, live games (poker, craps), etc. The tax rate varies between 30% and 35%, depending on the type of gambling. This part of the profit is paid by the gambling operator. The tax base can simply be understood as the difference between the gambling revenue and the winnings paid out, as long as the actual tax do not go below the minimum sub-tax.

== Tax Administration ==
There are several levels of administrative bodies within the financial administration in Czech Republic.

=== Tax Offices and Specialised Tax Offices ===
Tax Offices are placed on the first level of the financial organisational hierarchy. Their main role is based around performing the administration of particular taxpayers and taxes. They transfer collected tax incomes and have several other roles surrounding the control, monitoring and supervision of the tax system and specific regions within the economy to prevent issues. A specialized tax office administers taxes of the law-stipulated tax subjects. There are also Territorial Branches that are organizational units of Tax Offices and their role corresponds to the same activities of Tax Offices.

=== Appellate Financial Directorate ===
"Appellate Financial Directorate (AFD) was established by Act No. 456/2011 Coll., on the Financial Administration of the Czech Republic as of 1. 1. 2013. The Appellate Financial Directorate carries out its activity for the whole territory of the Czech Republic and the seat of the Appellate Financial Directorate is in Brno. The Director of the Appellate Financial Directorate is appointed and removed by the Director-General of the General Financial Directorate."

AFD is responsible for performing the role of an administrative body and methodical management of the tax authorities. It follows up and makes decisions on the proceedings and appeals about administrative offences.

=== Ministry of Finance of the Czech Republic ===
The main role of the Ministry of Finance in the tax system is to supervise other lower tax authorities, because it is on the top of the administrative hierarchy. Otherwise the Ministry has more functions—not just supervising taxes. Its organization chart is divided into eight sections. Each section takes care of one area e.g. there is a section specializing in Financial management and audit, Public Budgets, International Relations and Financial Markets etc. The Ministry is also responsible for the state budget, the state final account and foreign-exchange policy.

The Ministry was established according to the Act No. 2/1969 Coll.

== History ==
The tax system in the Czech lands during Middle Ages developed similarly as in other European countries. The tax collecting was fully in the power of the reigning monarch.

During the reign of Charles IV. there were many possible tax reliefs, for example not paying any taxes from newly established vineyards for a period of twelve years. But there were also a special tax for Jewish minority. They had to pay an annual fee which was almost twice as high as the tax for the rest of the population for using land and protection from the king.

In 1546, there was implemented a tax from selling beer. This tax kept increasing till the end of the 16th century.

During the Austrian Empire in the 18th and 19th centuries, the Bohemian Kingdom (what is now the Czech Republic) carried a significant part of the tax burden, as one of the most industrialized parts of the empire, paying 32% of all taxes in the Austrian territories in 1750.

Since the break with the Soviet Union, multiple reforms have been done to bring the economy from a government run economy to a free market economy. This also brought a long range of tax reforms, including the introduction of a flat tax, and shift from direct taxes over to indirect taxes and large amounts of tax simplifications. In 1990, the Czech Republic introduced a long range of environmental charges, including air emission charges, CFC product charges, water extraction and pollution charges, sewage charges, charges for waste disposal, land conversion charges, and an airport noise tax.
