= Taxation in Morocco =

Like most states, Morocco is a tax state which means that government spending is mainly financed through payments by citizens or enterprises. The administrative organization responsible for tax policy in Morocco is called the Directorate General of Taxes (DGI).

== The main taxes in Morocco ==
Today, Moroccan taxes are divided into 4 main parts: direct taxes, value-added taxes, registration fees and stamps.

=== Income tax ===
Income tax applies to the income and profits of natural persons and partnerships that have not opted for corporate income tax. Concerned are the incomes:

- Wages and assimilated;
- Professional;
- Agricultural;
- Income and property profits;
- Income and profits from movable capital;

| Tranches of total taxable net income (per year) | Tax rate (2025) |
|---|---|
| Between 1 and 40 000 MAD | 0% |
| Between 40 001 and 60 000 MAD | 10% |
| Between 60 001 and 80 000 MAD | 20% |
| Between 80 001 and 100 000 MAD | 30% |
| Between 100 001 and 180 000 MAD | 34% |
| More than 180 001 MAD | 37% |

=== Housing tax ===
| Annual rental value | Rate |
|---|---|
| Between 0 and 5 000 MAD | 0% |
| Between 5 001 and 20 000 MAD | 10% |
| Between 20 001 and 40 000 MAD | 20% |
| More than 40 001 MAD | 30% |

=== Corporate tax ===
Morocco introduced a corporate tax reform in 2023, with changes being implemented gradually until 2026. Corporate tax is levied on the income and profits of corporations, public institutions and other legal entities that carry out lucrative transactions and irrevocable option for partnerships.

| Types | Tax Rate |
|---|---|
| Standard rate for insurance companies, banks and financial institutions | Up to 40% (financial institutions) |
| From 0 to 300 000 MAD | 17.5% |
| From 300 001 to 1 000 000 MAD | 20% |
| 1 000 001 to 100 000 000 MAD | 22.75% |
| Above 100 000 000 MAD | 34% |
| Leasing companies and credit institutions | 40% |
| Opt-in tax for contractors engaged in engineering, construction or assembly projects relating to industrial or technical installations | 8% of the contract price (net VAT and other similar taxes) |
| Companies operating in free trade zones (after five years of total exemption) | 8.75% |
| Companies with regional or international head offices as recognised by the Casablanca Finance City regime | 10% |
| Companies operating in specific regions in the North and in the South | 17.5% |
| Companies exporting goods and services whose tax-exempt statuses have expired after 5 years | 17.5% |
| Reduced rate for the first 5 years for agricultural income earners subject to corporate tax, family businesses, mining companies, hotels, private schools and educational institutions | 17.5% |
| Holding companies | 500 USD per year for the first 15 years |

==== Tax rate for foreign companies ====
Moroccan tax applies territorially. Foreign companies are liable on Moroccan-sourced income if they have a permanent establishment in Morocco. There is an opt-in tax for qualifying activities of 8% of contract amount (see rate table), which requires the submission of a tax declaration before 1 April of each fiscal year. Otherwise, tax incentives apply equally to resident and foreign companies. Moroccan residency status applies if a company is incorporated in Morocco or its place of effective management is in Morocco.

==== Capital gains taxation ====
Capital gains derived from the disposal of immovable property generally are subject to a 20% tax. Higher rates are applicable in some specific cases. Capital gains derived from the disposal of shares are subject to tax at 20%. Capital gains derived from the disposal of a residence used as principal residence for at least six years are exempt from taxation.

==== Main allowable deductions and tax credits ====
Expenses incurred in connection with business activities are generally deductible unless specifically excluded. The development as well as incorporation expenses shall be capitalised and depreciated for tax purposes over a period of five years. Interest on loans granted by direct shareholders is deductible if the capital is fully paid in.
Charitable contributions made by companies are deductible only if they are granted to foundations and societies explicitly provided by law. The contributions made to the community enterprise are deductible at up to 0.2% of the company turnover. Tax losses may be carried forward for a period of four years from the end of the loss-making accounting period. However, the portion of a loss that relates to depreciation may be carried forward indefinitely. The carry back of losses is not permitted. Foreign tax relief is provided for foreign-sourced income. Morocco offers tax incentives in the form of tax exemption or taxation at more advantageous rates for local and foreign investors. Newly incorporated companies are exempt from the business tax for a period of five years. Exporting companies and businesses operating tourism facilities (subject to certain conditions) are exempt from corporation tax for the first five years of activity and are subject to lower rates beyond that period. Certain companies established in free trade zones are exempt from the business tax for a period of 15 years, and from corporation tax during the first five years of activity (followed by a taxation at a rate of 8.75% after these five years for a period of 20 years).

==== Other corporate taxes ====
A Payroll tax (called professional training tax) is imposed on the gross monthly remuneration of employees that are subject to social security contributions, at a rate of 1.6%.
Registration duties are due on all written or verbal conventions, such as property transfer of real estate, shares, or rights; company set up; equity increase; and goodwill transfer. The rates of registration duties range from 1% to 6%. A flat rate of 200 MAD is also applicable to specific operations and conventions. The company set up and the capital increase are subject to registration duties at the rate of 1%. The transfer of non-listed shares is subject to registration duties at the rate of 4%. However, a 6% rate is applicable to the transfer of shares of real estate companies. The applicable rate for the transfer of goodwill is 6%.
A municipal tax is levied at a rate of 10.5% of the rental value of properties located in urban areas and 6.5% for properties located on the outskirts of cities. The business tax consists of a tax on the rental value of business premises (rented or owned) and fixed assets. The tax rates range from 10% to 30%, with exemption for the five first years of activity. The rental value is exempted for the portion of cost exceeding 50 million MAD.

=== Value added tax ===
The normal rate is 20%. The reduced rates are 7% for certain consumer products, 10% for certain food products, beverages and the hotel industry in particular and 14% for other products.

=== Taxable gross income (TGI) ===
Taxes in Morocco depend on taxable gross income. Indeed, being made up of the total amount of salaries and wages received, as well as all the benefits in cash or in kind granted in addition to the salary.

=== Net taxable income (NTI) ===
Net taxable income (NTI) is deducted from the gross taxable income (TGI): A lump sum for expenses inherent to the profession. This amount amounts to 20% of the gross taxable income (except special cases, such as journalists, miners, merchant marine crew, etc.) with a ceiling of 30,000 MAD.

== Tax level in Morocco compared to other African countries ==
According to the OECD's Revenue Statistics in Africa 2018, Morocco’s tax-to-GDP ratio, including social security contributions, amounted to 26.4% in 2016. One of the highest ratios, following Tunisia (29.4%) and South Africa (28.6%).

This represents an increase of just under half a percentage point from 2015 (26.1% of GDP), when Morocco was second after Tunisia (30.3%). However, Morocco’s tax-to-GDP ratio remains below the OECD average (34.3%).

== See also ==
- Economy of Morocco
