= Taxation in Slovakia =

In Slovakia, taxes are levied by the state and local governments. Tax revenue stood at 19.3% of the country's gross domestic product in 2021. The tax-to-GDP ratio in Slovakia deviates from OECD average of 34.0% by 0.8 percent and in 2022 was 34.8% which ranks Slovakia 19th in the tax-to-GDP ratio comparison among the OECD countries. The most important revenue sources for the state government are income tax, social security, value-added tax and corporate tax.

== Income tax ==
Slovakia has a singular tax system that applies uniformly across the entire country, meaning there are no regional variations or local taxes on income.

=== On individual (personal) income ===
A person considered a tax resident in Slovakia is obligated to pay taxes on their global income, regardless of whether it's brought into Slovakia. On the other hand, individuals classified as Slovak tax non-residents are only taxed on income sourced within Slovakia. This includes earnings from work done within the country, such as director's fees or income from a business operated through a permanent establishment (PE). Additionally, income from services provided in Slovakia, interest, license fees, and revenue from selling or renting property located in Slovakia are also considered Slovak-source income.

==== Rates ====
There are two main personal income tax rates levied in Slovakia: a 19% rate on income up to 176.8 times the subsistence level, which is EUR 41,445.49 as of 2023, and a 25% rate for the exceeding part of the income.

Revenue generated from capital gains falls within a special tax bracket, which is subject to taxation at a rate of 19%.

==== Allowances ====
Individuals in Slovakia are entitled to personal allowances, which are calculated based on a multiple of the minimum subsistence amount declared on January 1 each year. This allowance is applicable to those whose annual taxable income falls below a specified threshold. However, if an individual's taxable income exceeds this threshold, the personal allowance is gradually reduced to zero using a predetermined formula.

For the year 2023, the personal allowance stands at EUR 4,922.82, determined by the minimum subsistence amount in effect on January 1, 2023. Individuals whose taxable income for 2023 surpasses EUR 21,754.18 cannot utilize the entire non-taxable personal allowance. Instead, their allowance diminishes progressively, with those earning an annual income equal to or exceeding EUR 41,445.46 in 2023 forfeiting any entitlement to personal allowance.

Moreover, tax residents of Slovakia with permanent residency can also claim a dependent spouse allowance, which is up to 19.2 times the minimum subsistence amount, provided their spouse's income does not exceed a specified threshold (EUR 4,500.86 in 2023). The exact amount of this allowance is contingent upon the incomes of both the individual and their spouse for the year 2023, determined by a predefined formula. However, if an individual's taxable income equals or exceeds EUR 41,445.46 in 2023, they are ineligible for the spouse allowance. Non-residents in Slovakia are eligible for the spouse allowance only if 90% of their worldwide income originates from Slovak sources.

Both personal and dependent spouse allowances can only reduce income derived from employment, business, or self-employment activities. Additionally, the spouse allowance is only applicable if the spouse resides with the taxpayer in the same household and meets specific criteria, such as caring for a dependent child (annual child tax bonus is EUR 282.84 as of 2022), receiving a nursing allowance, actively seeking employment with a labour office, or being classified as disabled.

==== Private business deductions ====
Private entrepreneurs are eligible to deduct standard business expenditures essential for the operation, security, and revenue generation of their businesses, provided they maintain accurate records of their earnings and expenditures. When it comes to rental income, expenses should be meticulously documented in sequential order.

Alternatively, entrepreneurs who are not registered as Slovak VAT payers have the option to claim a flat-rate deduction of 60% of their income (up to a maximum annual limit of EUR 20,000) to calculate their taxable income. However, under this arrangement, actual business expenses or rental costs are not eligible for tax deductions.

==== Exceptions ====
Certain types of income are exempt from taxation or are not subject to taxation under Slovak tax laws. Examples include scholarships provided from the state budget or by higher education institutions, as well as similar benefits from abroad. Additionally, financial resources from grants issued based on international treaties, binding Slovakia, are exempt from taxation. Benefits received from health and social insurance, including old-age savings, are also not subject to taxation. Per diems and employer contributions to employee board expenses, up to amounts specified by law, fall under this exemption. Furthermore, income derived from employment within the territory of Slovakia by a taxpayer with restricted tax liability, employed by a foreign-based employer, is exempt from taxation if the duration of such work does not exceed 183 days within any 12-month period. Tax liability is contingent upon the taxpayer's residency status, with unrestricted tax liability applying to individuals with permanent residence or domicile in Slovak Republic, or those who usually stay there for at least 183 days in a calendar year. Conversely, taxpayers with restricted tax liability, including individuals without permanent residency in Slovakia or those who stay in the country for less than 183 days per year, are only taxed on income earned within the country.

=== On corporate income ===
Slovakia primarily follows the OECD's guidelines and principles regarding the system of corporate taxation. All companies, including foreign company branches, are subject to the Corporate Income Tax (CIT) on their profits.

Slovak tax residents, including companies meeting the criteria for tax residency in the Slovak Republic, are obligated to pay taxes on their global income. They have the option to utilize either the exemption or credit method to alleviate double taxation on income taxed abroad, depending on the provisions outlined in the applicable double tax treaty (DTT) and the nature of the income. A company is considered a tax resident in Slovakia if it has its registered seat here, its effective place of management is Slovakia where key management decisions are made or accepted, or if it is not considered a tax resident in another contractual country according to the relevant DTT.

Non-residents in Slovakia are only taxed on income derived from Slovak sources. This includes various types of income specified by local tax regulations, such as business profits from permanent establishments (PEs) and passive income like royalties, interest, and proceeds from asset sales.

==== Corporate Income Tax (CIT) Rates ====
The standard CIT rate for the year 2023 is 21%. However, a reduced CIT rate of 15% is available for corporate taxpayers, entrepreneurs, and self-employed individuals whose taxable revenues does not exceed EUR 49,790 for the respective tax period.

==== Withholding Tax (WHT) Rates ====
Certain taxable dividend payments to individuals may be subject to a withholding tax (WHT) of 7%. Additionally, specific types of income, such as interest or royalties, may incur a WHT rate of 19%. Notably, a distinct WHT rate of 35% applies to payments made to taxpayers from non-cooperative jurisdictions or in cases where the beneficial owners of the income cannot be identified, including taxable dividend payments. Non-cooperative jurisdictions are those without a DTT or Tax Information Exchange Agreement (TIEA), listed in the EU's List of Non-Cooperating Countries, or where no Corporate Income Tax (CIT) is applicable, or a zero CIT rate is enforced.

==== Deductions ====
Corporate income tax deductions encompass various expenses and allowances that contribute to reducing taxable income for companies operating in Slovakia. These deductions include depreciation and amortization of tangible fixed assets, with different depreciation periods assigned to assets categorized into six tax depreciation groups. Start-up expenses are also deductible in the period incurred, while interest expenses incurred to generate taxable income are generally tax deductible, subject to thin capitalization rules. Provisions for bad debts and contributions to supplementary pension savings are deductible under certain conditions, while penalties and fines are generally not tax deductible. Charitable contributions are treated as gifts and are not tax deductible, and certain expenses, such as entertainment costs and certain provisions, are specifically non-deductible. Additionally, net operating losses can be carried forward and utilized over a specified period, and deductions may be claimed for payments to foreign affiliates, subject to certain limitations.

== Social Security contributions ==
All employment income is mandated to pay into various social funds by law. In 2021 the rate for the employee is 13.4% and the employer contribution 35.2% of corresponding salary. Maximum monthly income base is 7,644 euros.

Persons resident in the EU are subject to the provisions of EC Regulation 883/2004, which provide for the applicable social security regulation in the case of cross-border activities. If non-EU residents work in Slovakia or Slovak nationals work in a third country, a bilateral social security agreement may provide for the applicable social security legislation.

Contribution for	Max. monthly ceiling	Employee	Employer	Sole entrepreneur
State Pension Insurance	€7,644	4.00%	14.00%	18.00%
Disability Insurance	€7,644	3.00%	3.00%	6.00%
Reserve fund	€7,644	-	4.75%	4.75%
Incapacity Insurance	€7,644	1.40%	1.40%	4.40%
Unemployment Insurance	€7,644	1.00%	1.00%	2.00%
Guarantee fund	€7,644	-	0.25%	-
Injury Insurance	No maximum	-	0.80%	-
Health care Insurance	No maximum	4.00%	10.00%	14.00%
Total in %		13.40%	35.20%	49.15%

== Value-added tax ==
Value added tax in Slovakia is provided by the Act No. 227/2007 Coll. on the value added tax and other amendments. This legal framework is based on the Sixth Council Directive 77/388/EEC and other European legal acts. The standard rate for value-added tax is 20% but there are exceptions where the reduced rate of 10% can be applied. The reduced VAT rate applies to goods such as pharmaceutical health products, printed materials and media and important groceries like bread, milk, and meat, which are classified under selected codes of the Common Customs Tariff.

Since 2009, domestic businesses have to register for value added tax if their turnover for the past 12 months has reached 49,790 Euro. Foreign businesses have to register before starting their activities that will be accounted in the value added tax. There are cases where the obligation of value added taxes is passed to a domestic purchaser and in this form the registration of this business entity is avoided. Considering long distance exchanges, the business must register for the value added tax in the case the value of goods supplied is more than 35,000 Euro per year.

=== General information about VAT ===
The VAT rules are based on the principles of the Council Directive 2006/112/EC on the Common System of VAT. Subject to VAT are legal entities and individuals that carry on an economic activity.

==== Taxable events ====
1. the supply of goods and services for consideration within the territory of Slovakia by taxable persons acting as such
2. the intra-Community acquisition of goods for consideration within the territory of Slovakia from another EU Member State
3. the importation of goods into Slovakia

==== Taxable amount ====
Total consideration charged for the supply, excluding VAT but including any excise duties or other taxes and fees.

==== Tax period ====
The tax period for VAT is monthly or quarterly, based on turnover for the previous 12 consecutive calendar months. The compulsory tax period for new registered VAT payers is calendar months.

=== VAT Refund ===
A foreign entity that is not registered in the VAT system in the Slovak Republic can ask for a refund of VAT paid on services or goods provided by VAT payer in the territory of the country. It is important for VAT returns to be filed within 25 days from the last day of the taxable period. Value Added Tax returns must be filed every month. When the turnover does not exceed 100,000 Euro, tax can also be filed once every three months (quarterly based). In the scenario of excess value added tax, the refund is issued by the tax authorities within 30 days of the deadline for the VAT return.

== Corporate income taxes ==
=== General information about corporate income tax ===
==== Residence ====
In Slovakia a company is treated as resident if it has its legal seat or place of effective management in the Slovak Republic.

==== Tax period ====
The calendar year is the most common tax period. The business (fiscal) year may occur as well.

==== Taxable income ====
Companies which are resident in Slovakia are taxable on their worldwide income, including capital gains. This holds always, unless the company is exempted from tax. The taxable income is computed on the basis of the accounting profits and is adjusted for several items as described in the tax law.

==== Tax returns and assessment ====
All taxpayers have to calculate the tax due in the corporate income tax return (self-assessment). The deadline for filing the return is by the end of third month following the end of the tax period. The filling deadline may be extended from three to six months if part of the taxpayer's tax base consists of foreign-source income.

==== Advance tax payment ====
Advance tax refers to paying part of the taxes before the end of the financial year. It is also called the "pay-as-you-earn" scheme. Taxpayers can pay quarterly if the tax paid for previous year was between EUR 5,000 – EUR 16,600, or monthly, if the tax paid for previous year was higher than EUR 16,600. A new business entity established during the tax year (except if it is established by conversion, merger or division) is not required to make advance tax payments.

==== Deductions in taxes ====
There is a general rule for deductions. Expenses incurred in obtaining, ensuring and maintaining taxable income are fully deductible, unless they are listed as non-deductible items or items which are deductible only up to a limit set by the law.

==== Carry-forward of losses ====
Tax losses derived from 1 January 2014 to 31 December 2019 can be carried forward uniformly for four tax years. Tax losses derived before 2014 can no longer be carried forward.

With respect to tax loss reported for the tax period which begins no earlier than on 1 January 2020, new rules apply. The condition of equality of tax loss deduction shall not apply anymore and at the same time, the period for its deduction is extended from four years to five years. However, during the tax period, tax loss deduction of up to 50% of the tax base will be possible only, unless the taxpayer meets the definition of a “micro-taxpayer”.

==== Intercompany dividends ====
Dividends which were paid out of profits gained from 1 January 2004 are not subject to any tax in the hands of the shareholders. Other dividends are taxed at the standard tax rate of 21% if distributed after 31 December 2013. New conditions for reduced corporate income tax rate of 15% were introduced on 1 January 2020. If these conditions are fulfilled then the reduced rate should be applied.

=== Corporate income tax ===
Corporate income tax is levied at a rate of 21%. However, since 1 January 2021 taxpayers with taxable revenues up to EUR 49,790 per tax period are entitled to apply the reduced tax rate of 15%. This is the final tax burden on 2021 corporate profits in some cases because dividends paid out of 2021 profits are not taxed in the hands of shareholder if the shareholders are corporate and based in other than non-cooperating states.

Starting on 1 January 2018, a minimum corporate tax (so-called tax licenses), which was introduced in 2014, is abolished.

When setting up a business, there are some points that should be ensured:

- Prepare the registration for company income tax
- Record accounting
- Prepare company tax return for income tax
- Meet the payments deadline for income tax
- Meet the deadline for filing company tax return

Taxable profits of a corporation include:

- Money that comes from doing business or any other activity
- Money that comes from selling assets for a higher price than their costs
- Money that comes from other utilization of the property of the company

If the corporation is based in the Slovak Republic, the object of taxation is income from domestic and foreign sources. If the corporation is not based in the Slovak Republic, the object of taxation is only income from domestic sources.

=== International facets ===
==== Resident companies ====
===== Foreign income and capital gains =====
Resident companies are subject to taxation. They have to tax their worldwide income and capital gains. Calculation of the taxable amount is the same as in the case of domestic income.

===== Dividend income paid by non-resident company =====
Dividends paid out of profits generated starting on 1 January 2004 until 31 December 2016 are not subject to any Slovak tax.

Dividends paid out of profits generated before 1 January 2004 are included in the taxable base of the recipient and taxed at a standard tax rate of 21%, or since 2020 there is a reduced rate of 15% which is applicable, unless rules implementing the EU Parent-Subsidiary Directive apply.

Dividends paid out of profits generated from 1 January 2017 should be included in a separate tax base and then taxable at 35% tax rate. This applies only if the distributing company is based in a non-cooperating state; otherwise, there are exemptions which can be applied.

===== Double taxation relief =====
There is no one-sided double taxation relief provided. Double taxation relief can only be applied on the basis of tax treaties.

==== Non-resident companies ====
===== Taxable income =====
Non-resident companies are subject to tax only on income gained from Slovak sources. All the taxation is provided by applying the same rules which are applicable to residents.

===== Withholding tax =====
There are two withholding tax rates levied in Slovakia. The first is the generally applied tax rate of 19%. The second is an increased tax rate of 35% which applies if the recipient is a resident of a non-cooperating state. If the state is a non-cooperating state, it is not on the white-list. This white-list is published by the Slovak Ministry of Finance. Countries which are not on the white-list in Slovakia include: Bahamas, Barbados, British Virgin Islands, Cayman Islands, Panama, Seychelles, Kenya, Oman, etc.

===== Dividend paid by resident companies to non-resident =====
There is no withholding tax on dividends which are paid to non-resident companies out of profits derived by the distributing company from 1 January 2004 until 31 December 2016.

Dividends paid out of profits which were generated before 1 January 2004 are (unless rules implementing the EU Parent-Subsidiary Directive apply) subject to a 19% final withholding tax, unless a reduced rate applies under a tax treaty.

Dividends paid out of profits which were generated from 1 January 2017 should be a subject to a 35% withholding tax, however, only if the recipients are foreign companies based in a non-cooperating state.

== Property tax ==
Property or real estate tax is imposed on individuals or companies that are owners of a building, flat, land and non-residential spaces. According to the type of property there are three kinds of tax classifications: tax on land (land tax), tax on buildings (building tax) and tax on apartments (apartment tax). The amount of annual property tax is mainly dependent on the area of the occupied land (measured in square meters), purpose of the property, number of floors etc. The amount of annual tax rate is highly effected by the specific tax rates that are set by municipal authorities. The property tax is compensated by the legal registered owner. In the case that this registered owner is not determined, the burden of the tax falls to the person who uses the property. The property tax is under the rule of the Act on Local Taxes.

== Tax reform after the Communist era ==
After the end of communism, a wide range of reforms were made to bring the country from a government-run economy to a free-market economy. A large tax reform was enacted in the year 2003. It included a wide range of reforms including abolishing most deductions on the income tax, and bringing it down to a flat rate of 19% instead of a progressive rate from 10% to 38%. The corporate tax rate fell from 25% to 19%. Furthermore, the two rates of VAT 14% and 20% were merged into one band of 19%. All inheritance and gift taxes were also abolished.

== Road tax and toll ==
Road tax and toll payment in Slovakia is compulsory. These are paid for with vignettes, purchased for periods of one week to one year. Cost is determined by the weight of the vehicle. Additional costs are incurred for trailers attached to vehicles.

=== Vehicles below 3.5 tons ===
Persons travelling on a highway or speedway in Slovakia with a vehicle with a maximum permissible total weight below 3.5 tons are obliged to pay road tax by buying a vignette. There is a traffic sign on each border crossing informing the driver of this obligation but no further reference within the country.

==== Types of vignettes ====
On 1 December 2015 the Slovak Republic commissioned the electronic system of vignette payment collection and records (hereinafter referred to only as the “electronic vignette system”) for the use of the specified sections of motorways and expressways (hereinafter referred to as the "specified road sections"). Switching the system of vignette payment collection and records into electronic form meant a change in the vignette form – the physical motorway stickers were replaced by vignettes in electronic form.

Currently, there are three types of electronic vignettes:

- 1-year vignette - valid from 1 January of the relevant calendar year (or the day of payment for the vignette by the customer in the relevant calendar year) until 31 January of the following calendar year
- 365-day vignette - valid for 365 days (including the day of starting date) from the date specified by the customer for the next 365 days.
- 30-day vignette - valid for 30 days (including the day of starting date) from the date specified by the customer
- 10-day vignette - valid for 10 days (including the day of starting date) from the date specified by the customer

If a trailer category O1 or O2 is attached (to a tractor vehicle within the vehicle categories M1, N1 or N1G, and the maximum permissible weight of the vehicle and trailer exceed 3.5 tons, drivers have to buy additional vignette for heavy vehicle combinations.

==== Prices ====
For 2021 the prices (including VAT) are the following:

- 1-year vignette - EUR 50
- 365-day vignette - EUR 50
- 30-day vignette - EUR 14
- 10-day vignette - EUR 10

=== Vehicles over 3.5 tons ===
Since January 1, 2010 all vehicles above 3.5 tons maximum permissible total weight (including busses) must pay electronic toll when driving in Slovakia. Information about this obligation is stated by a traffic sign on each border crossing. Generally all main corridors (national roads) and highways are toll liable. A company named SkyToll A.S. runs a system based on a combination of GPS, GSM and DSRC technology. Each driver has to stop at one of the distribution points located on each border crossing used by heavy traffic and register the vehicle. The driver obtains an electronic on-board unit.
