= Taxation in the Faroe Islands =

Taxation in the Faroe Islands has differed from the taxes in Denmark since home rule was granted in 1948. This gives the Faroe Islands control over their own taxes.

== Income taxation ==
All citizens of the Faroe Islands are subject to personal taxation. The government tax rate on incomes up to DKK 500,000 is 20%. Incomes higher than this pay a fixed amount, always resulting in a higher percentage. There are multiple tax deductions in the Faroes. This includes a 14% deduction for fishermen. However, this is limited to 14% of DKK 470,000 corresponding to a maximum annual deduction of DKK 65,800. A deduction for foreign workers also exists, and this deduction can be as high as 30%. Deductions are also available to students and parents.

== VAT and business taxes ==
The VAT or Value Added Tax, is a tax on imports and sales paid to the Faroese treasury. The VAT is deductible for income purposes. Companies that don't pay a VAT must pay an employer's tax. The corporate tax rate in the Faroe Islands stands at 18%.

== Tax administration ==
Citizens subject to taxation use the calendar year as the income tax/fiscal year. Generally, the income period for companies follows the accounting year, which has to be no longer than 12 months. However, the first accounting year can vary from 6 to 18 months.
