= Taxation in Kazakhstan =

The main legal act establishing and regulating taxation in Kazakhstan is the Code of the Republic of Kazakhstan On Taxes and Other Obligatory Payments to the Budget (the “Tax Code”). The Tax Code was adopted on 10 December 2008 and came into effect as of 1 January 2009.

== Historical Development ==
Kazakhstan declared its sovereignty as a member of the USSR in October 1990, and following the dissolution of the Soviet Union the country declared independence in December 1991. The first piece of Tax Legislation of the sovereign republic was the 1991 decree “On Taxes from Enterprises, Associations and Organizations”.

In 1995 the President issued a Decree “On Taxes and Other Obligatory Payments to the Budget" (the “Decree”), which regulated the tax system in Kazakhstan. The Decree only provided for general information on taxes and referred to several instructions which provided for specific information on each of the taxes.

In 2002 the Code of the Republic of Kazakhstan On Taxes and Other Obligatory Payments to the Budget (the “2002 Tax Code”) came into force. The 2002 Tax Code was a more comprehensive legal act than the Decree. In fact, the 2002 Tax Code regulated the relationships between the state and the taxpayer and provided for procedures on calculation and payment of taxes.

In 2008 the President announced that the Republic of Kazakhstan requires a new tax code, which should provide for lower tax rates and simplified tax administration procedures. As a result, the Code of the Republic of Kazakhstan On Taxes and Other Obligatory Payments to the Budget (the “Tax Code”) was adopted on 10 December 2008 and came into force as of 1 January 2009.

== Types of Taxes ==
Corporate income tax	The corporate income tax rate amounts to 20% in 2010, both for resident legal entities and non-resident legal entities operating in Kazakhstan through a registered permanent establishment (for non-residents also see branch profit tax below).
Value added tax	The value added tax rate is 16% and applies to sales turnover in Kazakhstan and to imports of goods and services to Kazakhstan. The turnover threshold for registering as a value added tax payer is KZT 38,190,000 or, approximately EUR 195,000. Export of goods is subject to 0% value added tax rate.
Personal income tax	Personal income tax is 10% for residents and 15% for non-residents.
Social tax	The social tax rate is paid by legal entities and amounts to 11% of salaries and in-kind benefits of employees.
Branch profit tax	A branch profit tax of 15% has to be paid on the net income after corporate income tax of permanent establishments of foreign legal entities operating in Kazakhstan.
Income tax withheld at source of payment	Income tax withheld at source of payment is levied on the income of non-residents from Kazakhstani sources. The tax rate is currently 15% in most cases. For residents of “tax havens” the tax rate is 20%. A lower tax rate of 5% applies to income from insurance premiums payable in accordance with reinsurance risk agreements and to income from international transportation services
Property tax	Property tax applies only to the buildings and the tax rate is 1,5% for legal entities.
Excise	Excise tax applies to alcohol (up to EUR 3 per liter), liquors (up to EUR 2,5 per liter), tobaccos (up to EUR 0,5 per piece), gasoline (up to EUR 25 per ton), crude oil (EUR 0 per ton), gas condensate (EUR 0 per ton) vehicles with engine volume of over 3 liters (EUR 0,5 per cubic centimeter of engine volume) produced in Kazakhstan or imported to Kazakhstan.
Rental tax on exports	The rental tax applies to export of crude oil, gas condensate and coal. The tax rate depends on the market price of crude oil and gas condensate (from 0% when the market price of one barrel is US$20 to 32% when market price for one barrel is US$200 or higher).
Subsurface use taxation	The subsurface use taxes include signature bonus and commercial discovery bonuses, payments to compensate historic costs, tax on the production of minerals and an excess profit tax.
Vehicle tax	The vehicle tax is levied based on engine volume, vehicle weight or quantity of seats.
Land tax	Land tax applies to legal entities possessing plots of land or the right to use them.
Other taxes, state fees and dues	Other taxes include among others special taxes for gambling businesses. The state further levies different kinds fees on registration, licensing, environment pollution, for the use of water resources, forests etc.
