= Taxation in Poland =

Taxes in Poland are levied by both the central and local governments. Tax revenue in Poland is 33.9% of the country's GDP in 2017. The most important revenue sources include the income tax, Social Security, corporate tax and the value added tax, which are all applied on the national level.

Income earned is generally subject to a progressive income tax, which applies to all who are in the workforce. For the year 2014, two different tax rates on income apply.

In Poland, people with the highest incomes are required to pay a solidarity levy, often referred to as the third tax bracket. It amounts to 4% on annual income exceeding 1,000,000 PLN. The funds collected are allocated to the Solidarity Support Fund for Disabled Persons.

== Value added tax (VAT) ==
In 1993, Poland implemented its Value Added Tax system. Polish VAT is overseen by VAT acts and the Fiscal Penal Code, and is enforced by the Ministry of Finance.

Value-Added Tax applies to most trade in goods in Poland. 23% is the basic rate. Lower rates of 8% and 5% also apply for foodstuffs. Furthermore, some services are taxed at 0% tax rate or exempted from value-added tax (eg. financial and postal services).

== Income tax scale before 2017 ==
Annual income	Tax rate
3091-85,528 PLN	18% of the income - 556,02 PLN
over 85,528 PLN	14,839.02 PLN + 32% of the surplus over 85,528 PLN

== Income tax scale in 2017 ==
In 2017, tax rates were changed. podatki.gov.pl - Stawki i limity Now, the tax is calculated using two tables. The first table does determine the amount of tax.

Annual income	Income tax
0 PLN - 85,528 PLN	18% of income minus tax-reducing amount
over 85,528 PLN	15,395.04 PLN + 32% of the surplus over 85,528 PLN minus tax-reducing amount

The second table is used to determine the tax-reducing amount from the tax.

Annual income	Tax-reducing amount(amount to subtract from the tax)
0 PLN - 6,600 PLN	1,188 PLN
6,600 PLN - 11,000 PLN	$631.98 \times (income - 6,600) \over 4,400$ PLN
11,000 PLN - 85,528 PLN	556.02 PLN
85,528 PLN - 127,000 PLN	$556.02 \times (income - 85,528) \over 41,472$PLN
over 127,000 PLN	0 PLN

== Income tax scale in 2018 ==
In 2018, the tax scale was again changed. Income tax was calculated as follows:

Annual income	Income tax
0 PLN - 85,528 PLN	18% of income minus tax-reducing amount
over 85,528 PLN	15,395.04 PLN + 32% of the surplus over 85,528 PLN minus tax-reducing amount

The second table is used to determine the tax-reducing amount from the tax.

Annual income	Tax-reducing amount (amount to subtract from the tax)
0 PLN - 8,000 PLN	1,440 PLN
8,000 PLN - 13,000 PLN	$883.98 \times (income - 8,000) \over 5,000$ PLN
13,000 PLN - 85,528 PLN	556.02 PLN
85,528 PLN - 127,000 PLN	$556.02 \times (income - 85,528) \over 41,472$PLN
over 127,000 PLN	0 PLN

== Income tax scale in 2019 ==
In 2019, the tax scale was again changed. Income tax in 2019 is calculated as follows:

Annual income	Income tax
0 PLN - 85,528 PLN	17.75% of income minus tax-reducing amount
over 85,528 PLN	15,181.22 PLN + 32% of the surplus over 85,528 PLN minus tax-reducing amount

The second table is used to determine the tax-reducing amount from the tax.

Annual income	Tax-reducing amount (amount to subtract from the tax)
0 PLN - 8,000 PLN	1,420 PLN
8,000 PLN - 13,000 PLN	$871.70 \times (income - 8,000) \over 5,000$ PLN
13,000 PLN - 85,528 PLN	548.30 PLN
85,528 PLN - 127,000 PLN	$548.30 \times (income - 85,528) \over 41,472$PLN
over 127,000 PLN	0 PLN

== Income tax scale in 2020 ==
In 2020, the tax scale was changed again. Income tax in 2020 is calculated as follows:

Annual income	Income tax
0 PLN - 85,528 PLN	17% of income minus tax-reducing amount
over 85,528 PLN	14,539.76 PLN + 32% of the surplus over 85,528 PLN

The second table is used to determine the tax-reducing amount from the tax in 2020.

Annual income	Tax-reducing amount (amount to subtract from the tax)
0 PLN - 8,000 PLN	1,360 PLN
8,000 PLN - 13,000 PLN	$834.88 \times (income - 8,000) \over 5,000$ PLN
13,000 PLN - 85,528 PLN	525.12 PLN
85,528 PLN - 127,000 PLN	$525.12 \times (income - 85,528) \over 41,472$PLN
over 127,000 PLN	0 PLN

== Income tax scale in 2022 ==
in 2022, there were significant changes in the tax-free amount and in taxes.

The tax-free amount has been increased to 30,000 PLN year (6,600 Euro per year), for every income and is deducted from salary every month

Annual Income	Income Tax
0 PLN - 120,000 PLN	12% minus tax reducing amount (3,600 PLN, 300 PLN every month)
over 120,000 PLN	3,600 PLN + 32% of the surplus over 120,000 PLN

There is also a non-deducted health care rate for each income of 9% and a reduction for the flat tax (for the self-employed) of 4.9%. This makes everyone pay the fee even if their income is in the free amount.

== Income tax scale in 2023 ==
In 2023 tax-free amount remains at level of 30,000 PLN year for every income and is deducted from salary every month

Annual Income	Income Tax
0 PLN - 120,000 PLN	12% minus tax reducing amount (3,600 PLN, 300 PLN every month)
over 120,000 PLN	10.800 PLN + 32% of the surplus over 120,000 PLN

== Social security contributions in 2014 ==
Furthermore, a range of social security contributions apply to all in the workforce, and are shared by the employee and the employer. These insurance contributions are paid by both private and public employees until a given ceiling. For the year 2014, the rates in the following table apply

Insurance policy	Total	Employee %	Employer %
Pension Fund	19.52%	9.76%	9.76%
Disability Fund	8.00%	1.5%	6.5%
Bridging Pension Fund	-	-	0-1.5%
Illness Fund	2.45%	2.45%	-
Accident Fund	0.67%-3.86%	-	0.67%-3.86%
Employees Benefits Fund	0.10%	-	0.10%
Labor Fund	2.45%	-	2.45%
Total (up to limit)	19.48%-24.17%	13.71%	19.48%-24.17%
Total (past limit)	5.67%–8.86%	2.45%	3.22%–6.41%

Overall worker tax rate and mandatory insurance amount to 53%.

== Social security contributions in 2023 ==
The cap of salaries in 2023, for which rates below apply, is PLN 208,050.

Insurance policy	Total	Employee % (of total gross salary)	Employer % (of total gross salary)
Pensions and disability insurance	27.52%	11.26%	16.26%
Sickness insurance	2.45%	2.45%	-
Accident insurance	0.67%-3.33%	-	1.67%(up to 9 employees), 0.67%-3.33% (more than 9 employees - rate depends on the business sector
Labour Fund	2.45%	-	2.45%
Employee Guaranteed Benefits Fund	0.10%	-	0.10%

== See also ==
- Economy of Poland
