= Taxation in Bulgaria =

Taxes in Bulgaria are collected on both state and local levels. The most important taxes are collected on state level, these taxes include income tax, social security, corporate taxes and value added tax. On the local level, property taxes as well as various fees are collected. All income earned in Bulgaria is taxed on a flat rate of 10%. Employment income earned in Bulgaria is also subject to various social security insurance contributions. In total the employee pays 13.78% and the employer contributes what corresponds from 18.92% to 19.62%. Corporate income tax is also a flat 10%. Value-Added Tax applies at a flat rate of 20% on virtually all goods and services. A lower rate of 9% applies on only hotel services.

Bulgarian state taxes are administered by the National Revenue Agency (NRA). The National Assembly has the power to lay and collect Taxes, Duties, Imposts, and Excises. The municipal council shall determine the rate of local taxes.

== History ==
Taxation in Bulgaria has shifted depending on which government was in control. During the First Bulgarian Empire taxes were paid in kind while during the Second Bulgarian Empire taxation was monetary. Under the Ottoman control of Bulgaria, Christian citizens were subject to a tax called the dhimmi, levied by the Ottoman authority. During the socialist period of planned economy, taxation was similar to that of the rest of the Soviet, often with a turnover tax and taxes on government run businesses. After the end of the Soviet era, large privatization took place and the turnover tax was replaced with an ordinary Value-Added Tax.

Upon joining the European Union in 2007, Bulgaria initiated reforms aimed at reducing the share of economic activity outside the tax system. These included a flat corporate tax rate of 10% starting in 2007, a flat personal income tax rate of 10% in 2008, and cuts to social security contributions and taxes on dividends.

== Income tax ==
Income tax in Bulgaria is levied according to the Income Tax on Natural Persons Act. Beginning in 2008, this introduced sweeping changes to the tax system, including eliminating the previous progressive taxation rates and replacing them with a flat tax with no tax-free threshold. This applies a tax of 10% on the taxable income of both employees and sole proprietors.

Individuals can receive a number of deductions from their taxable income, including for raising children, for charitable donations, and for their mandatory contributions to social security or voluntary ones to pension and health and life insurance plans. Individuals' business income also receives deductions based on pre-estimated rates of expenses for different fields, for example farmers deduct 60% of their income from this profession from their tax base, and lawyers deduct 40%.

== Social security contributions ==
Employers in Bulgaria must withhold mandatory social security contributions from the salaries of their employees, as well as paying the required employer contributions. This applies to all employees within the Bulgarian social security system who earn the minimum wage or above, though only up to the maximum social security income (3,750 BGN per month in 2024).

Employers must withhold 13.78% from an employee's gross remuneration, and directly pay an additional 18.92-19.62%, with the exact amount depending on the type of the employer's economic activity. The total amount of 32.70-33.40% is allocated in the following way:

- 19.8% is paid to the Pension Fund or for pension insurance;
- 3.5% is paid to the General Disease and Maternity Fund;
- 1% is paid to the Unemployment Fund;
- 0.4-1.1% is paid to the Accident at Work and Occupational Diseases Fund; and,
- 8% is paid to health insurance.

== Corporate income tax ==
Corporate income tax rates in Bulgaria have been decreased gradually from 40% in 1996, until differences in rates between small and large businesses were abolished and a flat rate of 10% was introduced in 2007.

== Literature ==
- Tax law and tax process – Ivan G. Stoyanov (Feneia, Sofia 2012) ISBN 9789549499902
- Taxation 2015 Commentory – Rosen Ivanov (Ciela, Sofia 2015) ISBN 978-954-28-1647-8
