= Taxation in the Bahamas =

Taxation in the Bahamas is collected by the Government of the Bahamas. The Bahamas are considered a tax haven given the lack of income tax, capital gains tax, inheritance tax or company tax. Government tax revenue is instead derived from consumption, property and import taxes as well as licence fees.

The country's lack of income and corporate profit taxes has seen it become a popular drawcard for high net-worth individuals moving to the Bahamas and becoming residents for tax purposes to avoid high taxes in their home countries, including a number of high profile people such as Eugenie Bouchard and Sean Connery. Tax residency certificates are issued to individuals who spend at least 90 days in the Bahamas and under 184 days in any other single country and purchase a property worth in excess of $1.5 million.

Tax revenues made up 22.4% of gross domestic product (GDP) in the Bahamas in 2016. The Bahamas has not entered into any double tax agreements.

== Income and individual taxes ==
The Bahamas does not impose income tax, inheritance tax or wealth tax. Social security tax is payable to the National Insurance Board at 3.9% by employees and 5.9% by employers, or 9.8% for self-employed individuals, up to maximum amounts.

== Property taxes ==
Property tax is imposed on all properties, with the rate for residential properties dependent on whether the home was occupied by its owner for at least six months of the calendar year, under reforms introduced in 2019. If the residency requirement is met, the first $250,000 of property value is exempted, while the value up to $500,000 is taxed at a rate of 0.75% and at 1% on value in excess of $500,000. If the residency requirement is failed, a 1% tax is imposed for the value up to $500,000 of assessed value and 2% for the value in excess of $500,000. Prior to 2019, property taxes were capped annually at $500,000.

Furthermore, stamp duty is payable on the transfer of realty and marina slips, at 2.5% for valuations under $100,000 and 10% over $100,000.

== Corporate taxes ==
There is no corporate tax, withholding tax, payroll tax or transfer tax levied on businesses in the Bahamas. However, businesses require a licence to operate, which is charged at either a flat-rate of $100 or at up to 3% of turnover depending on the amount of revenue generated.

== Value added tax (VAT) ==
A value added tax applies to a majority of transactions at a rate of 10%. The VAT was increased from 7.5% in 2018. The VAT was introduced in 2015, replacing a 10% tax on hotel lodgings. A number of essential items, such as grocery staples, medicines and property insurance, are exempt from VAT.

== Import duties ==
Import duties are applied to a wide variety of goods being brought into the Bahamas. The Ministry of Finance maintains a list of commonly imported items, each with its own import duty payable before release to the owner, which can range from zero to 75% of the item's value. VAT, stamp duties and fixed-price environmental levies are also applicable to some imported goods applied at various rates.
