= Taxation in Bosnia and Herzegovina =

Taxation in Bosnia and Herzegovina includes both federal and local taxes. Tax revenue in Bosnia and Herzegovina stood at 28.6% of GDP in 2013. Most important revenue sources include the income tax, Social Security contributions, corporate tax, and the value added tax, which are all applied on the federal level.

Income tax is applied on a flat tax rate of 10% on income from both employment, interest, royalties, and capital gains. Social Security apply to most employment income. The employee pay 33% of gross salary, while the employer contribute 10.5% in addition. The Value-added tax in Bosnia is 17% as standard rate. Various Goods are services are exempt from VAT, including medical care, posting services, financial services, education and various smaller occasions.

Stamp duties apply on various verifications of public documents. For incorporation purposes, stamp duties may range from EUR 50 to EUR 100. Corporate Taxes in Bosnia is levied at a flat rate of 10%.

== History ==
Taxation in Bosnia has shifted over time, depending on the government that was in power. During the Yugoslav era taxation was similar to that of the Soviet, which typically relied heavily on a turnover tax and taxes paid by enterprises. In case of this two taxes they respectively made up 50% and 5% of total revenue in 1963.
