= Taxation in Denmark =

Taxation in Denmark consists of a comprehensive system of direct and indirect taxes. Ever since the income tax was introduced in Denmark via a fundamental tax reform in 1903, it has been a fundamental pillar in the Danish tax system. Today various personal and corporate income taxes yield around two thirds of the total Danish tax revenues, indirect taxes being responsible for the last third. The state personal income tax is a progressive tax while the municipal income tax is a proportional tax above a certain income level.

== History ==
=== Overview ===
The types and levels of taxation in Denmark have changed dramatically since the state's inception. In the sixteenth century, Denmark primarily obtained state income through taxes excised on feudal Demesne lands and the Sound Dues, which required foreign ships to pay a toll when passing through the Øresund bordering Denmark. In fact, the Dues comprised two-thirds of Denmark's tax revenue throughout the sixteenth and seventeenth centuries. The costs of warfare, such as those of the Thirty Years' War, were further fulfilled by Denmark's heavily agricultural economy. In later conflicts such as the Scanian War and the Great Northern War, however, Denmark ceded much of its territory, resulting in monetary losses that prompted higher tax rates and the introduction of an initially small income tax. Massive population growth resulted in expansion of agriculture and consequently an expansion of taxes gained from tariffs on exports and wheat sales. By 1897, Denmark's income tax encompassed 15.00% of the state's total revenue, far surpassing any other European country at the time. From 1897 to the present, Denmark continued to boast exceptionally high income tax rates, never dropping below the top five countries in Europe in terms of percentage revenue earned from income taxes. Following World War II, as with many other countries, Denmark began to enact several social welfare programs, including aid for the sick and the unemployed. These, along with expansion of the public sector (schools, teachers, etc.) contributed to the income tax being a staple of Denmark's tax revenue.

=== Changes in the 20th and 21st Centuries ===
The exact form of income tax has varied through the past century. Between 1903 and 1966, income tax was levied only on "assessed" income, which did not include personal taxes that were spent on other areas, such as to the church. After 1966, income tax was changed to be levied on taxable income, which included personal taxes spent on other areas and later also included income received from stocks and interest. In recent years, public sentiment towards taxes has leaned towards limiting the welfare state and consequently the income tax. In 2001, a "tax freeze" that prevented the further increase of taxes was administered by the then liberal-conservative government of Denmark. The tax freeze could only be waived in particular times of crisis, and a tax could only be increased at the expense of a different form of tax. Furthermore, the Danish Tax Reform of 2010 gradually cut taxes "to increase labour supply in the medium to long term and at same time contribute to soften the effects of the global economic crises in the short run." The tax cuts impacted the high, middle, and low classes, and resulted in a net cut of 30 billion DKK between 2010 and 2019. Despite these policies, income taxes have stabilized at providing around 50% of Denmark's total revenue since 1990. According to the World Happiness Report, Denmark ranks among the top two in terms of happiness, indicating a general contentedness with the state's welfare state and the benefits provided. The World Happiness Report also states that happiness is correlated to social equality. The official Denmark website remarks that "most Danes will tell you that they are happy to pay taxes because they can see what they get in return," including free tuition, healthcare, and social security.

== Taxes on income ==
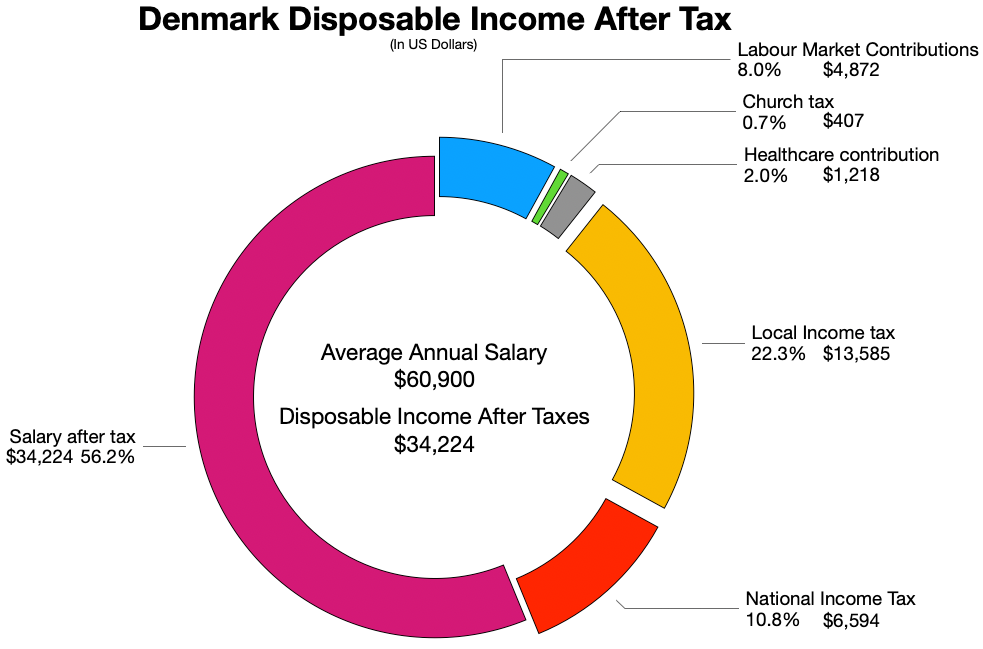
Denmark disposable income after tax Not including Value-added tax or Property tax

=== Municipal & National income tax ===
All income from employment or self-employment is taxed at 8% before income tax. This tax is termed a "labour market contribution" (Danish: arbejdsmarkedsbidrag) or colloquially a "gross tax" (Danish: bruttoskat). The funds levied through this tax support the functions related to the labour market including subsidising the semi-private salary insurance called Dagpenge.

Income below DKK 50,543 (~US $8,300) (2021-level, adjusted annually) is income tax-free, but subject to the gross tax.

The state (i.e., national) income tax has two income brackets (bottom and top). In 2016, around 10% of all tax payers had sufficiently high taxable incomes to be eligible for the top-bracket tax.

In 2023 the Social Democratic-liberal coalition government of Prime Minister Mette Frederiksen passed a tax reform that split the previous top-income tax bracket into three brackets:

- First bracket: the so-called “Middle tax” (Danish: mellemskat) of an additional 7,5% on the margin levied on income between 618.400 and 750.000 DKK
- Second bracket of 7,5% additional marginal tax levied on income between 750.000 and 2.5 million DKK
- Third bracket: the so-called “Top-top tax” of an additional 5% marginal tax on income above 2.5 million DKK. However this has been criticized for being easily evadable by the individuals it is supposed to target

This tax reform is intended to increase long term labour supply, specifically in the light of the labour shortages experienced within various high skilled jobs, especially within fields like IT, engineering and health services

There is also a municipal income tax varies from municipality to municipality, with rates varying from 22.5% to 27.8% in 2019. Interest paid is deductible in the municipal tax. Interest expenses up to DKK 50,000 per individual (DKK 100,000 for couples) receive a further deduction of 8%. The great majority of tax payers have interest expenses below this threshold, implying that the tax value of interest expenditures for most tax payers is ca. 33%.

There exist a number of other important deductions in the municipal tax. Commuting exceeding 24 kilometres per day (15 mi/d) receives a DKK 1.98 per kilometre (DKK 3.19/mi) tax deduction. For most commutes exceeding 120 kilometres per day (75 mi/d), the rate is reduced to DKK 0.99 per kilometre (DKK 1.59/mi) above that threshold. A number of other deductions apply. Furthermore, union fees not exceeding DKK 6,000 annually are tax deductible as well as some other job-related expenses. Furthermore, most contributions to funded pension funds are deductible in both national and municipal taxes.

The sum of municipal and national tax percentages cannot exceed 52.05% (2019) – the so-called "tax ceiling" (Danish: skatteloft). Including the labour market contribution of 8%, the maximal effective marginal tax rate on labour income in 2019 is 55.9% (=0.08 + 0.92*0.5205). For capital income, there is a separate, lower maximum tax rate of 42% (Before inflation. Meaning real gains above inflation is effectively taxed higher than 42% because the tax is not adjusted for inflation).

The following table displays a summary of taxes paid to the national government, although the tax bases for each may be different.

National Income Tax Rates (2021)*
Income (DKK)	Gross (LMC)	State Tax	Effective Marginal Rate
0 – 50,542	8%	0%	8%
50,543 – 544,799	8%	12.16%	8% – 18.15%
544,800+	8%	15%	18.15% – 22.99%

*The table displayed above does not include the municipal income taxes, each of which have their own rates and income thresholds.

==== Researcher Tax Scheme ====
Certain people who have moved to Denmark to take up work as Researchers or Highly Paid Employees can become members of the Tax Scheme for Researchers. Members of the Scheme are exempt from normal taxation, but instead pay a 32.84% flat tax, inclusive of Labour market contributions.

Members of the Researcher Tax Scheme do not have tax cards as they are exempt and not part of the normal income tax system. They also do not pay Social Contributions or Municipal Taxes (except for taxes on wealth and property).

Members of the Scheme are only able to use it for taxes paid on their income at source, such as Payroll tax. If a member earns income that they have to report the tax on themselves (such as shares or at a side business) they have to pay tax on it through the normal system. When a member pays tax through the Researcher Scheme and through the normal taxation scheme the Government ignores their income from the Researcher Scheme when calculating their tax bands and tax rate.

Researcher Tax Scheme (2024)
Income Tax	Labour Market Contributions	Effective Rate
27%	8% after tax	32.84%

=== Social Security Contributions ===
There are also flat amounts in social contributions to particular funds in Denmark. These payments are set amounts in DKK, rather than a per cent of an individual's income. Both the employer and the employee are required by law to pay into these social funds, with the employee paying a total of DKK 1135 annually. The requirements for employers are displayed in the following table:

Social Security Contributions Summary
Fund	Employer Contribution (Average)
Mandatory Pension Scheme	DKK 2270
Educational Scheme	DKK 2780
Occupational Injury	DKK 215–5140
Pension Finance Scheme	DKK 590
Maternity Leave Fund	DKK 1150
Industrial Injury Insurance	DKK 1035–23470
Total	~ DKK 14900

=== Church tax ===
Members of the Danish National Church (about 75% of the Danish population) additionally pay an approximately 0.7% of their income to cover the expenditures of the National Church – the so-called church tax (Danish: kirkeskat). The exact rate depends on the municipality. Whereas the collection of the church tax is administered by the Danish tax authorities and the tax rate is levied upon the same official income concept as the municipal tax, the church tax is not regarded as a proper tax by e.g. Statistics Denmark, but as a "voluntary transfer from households to the state". One can be exempted from paying the church tax by opting out of being a member of the National Church.

=== Tax on owner-occupied dwellings ===
In Denmark a special tax is levied upon the imputed income of owner-occupied dwellings. Its purpose is to create symmetry in the tax system by taxing the imputed rent of house owners. In 2019 the official tax rate is 1% (3% above a certain threshold) of the assessed value of the dwelling. However, the official assessment value is currently rather low compared to the average real market value of the dwellings. In 2017 the Danish parliament Folketinget agreed upon a housing tax reform, according to which the effective tax rate from 2021 onward will be 0.44% (1.1% above a threshold) of a reformed and supposedly realistic assessment value.

=== Other income taxes ===
The Danish corporate tax rate from 2016 onward is 22% of taxable corporate income, almost exactly equal to the average corporate income tax rate in all OECD countries in 2018. Personal income from shares (dividends as well as realized capital gains) are taxed at 27% below ca. DKK 50,000 and at 42% above the threshold.

The annual yields of most pension scheme assets is subject to a special tax of 15.3%. As assets in funded pension schemes make up a considerable part of national wealth in Denmark, this tax gives a considerable—and growing—revenue, amounting to DKK 32 billion in 2017 or around 3% of total tax revenues.

== Indirect taxation ==
The revenue from indirect taxes constituted around one third of the total Danish tax revenue in 2016. The single most important indirect tax as regards revenue is the Danish VAT, but Denmark also levies a land value tax on all privately owned land and a number of excise taxes.

=== VAT ===
Year	VAT level (Denmark)	Name
1967	10%	MOMS
1968	12.5%	MOMS
1970	15%	MOMS
1977	18%	MOMS
1978	20.25%	MOMS
1980	22%	MOMS
1992	25%	MOMS

Denmark has a non-deductible value added tax (VAT) of 25% abbreviated as MOMS (Danish: merværdiafgift, formerly meromsætningsafgift). The tax is subject to the European Union value added tax Directives.

In Denmark, VAT is generally applied at one rate, and with few exceptions is not split into two or more rates as in other countries (e.g. Germany), where reduced rates apply to essential goods such as foodstuffs. A number of services are not subject to VAT, however, for instance public transportation of private persons, health care services, publishing newspapers, rent of premises (the lessor can, though, voluntarily register as VAT payer, except for residential premises), and travel agency operations.

=== Land value tax ===
The Danish grundskyld (part of the Municipal Property Tax) is a land value tax, which taxes the base value of the land according to either:

- The total value of the property minus the value of improvements or
- The value of the property last tax year, altered by a growth/decline percentage.

Whichever of those two assessments is lower results in the base land value. This base land value is taxed at between 1.6 and 3.4% in 2019. Agricultural land is taxed as well, but at lower rates.

=== Registration fee on motorized vehicles ===
Like in Singapore, Brazil, and Norway, Denmark has a very high public taxation fee on buying motorized vehicles (cars, motorcycles, commercial vehicles). The motorized vehicle registration tax for private households is over 100% of approximately the first 100,000 DKK of the auto dealer's price, and 150% on the amounts over appr. 100.000 DKK of the auto dealer's price on the vehicle. Commercial enterprises and two-seater vehicles for private household buyers (no passenger seats in the back) pay a lower registration fee. An additional tax is required if commercial vehicles are used for private purposes. If this tax is not paid, and the vehicle is used privately, the tax penalty is severe.

== Denmark's tax structure in international comparison ==
The tax structure of Denmark (the relative weight of different taxes) differs from the OECD average. In 2016, the Danish tax system was characterized by substantially higher revenues from taxes on personal income, whereas on the other hand, no revenues at all derive from social security contributions. A lower proportion of revenues in Denmark derive from taxes on corporate income and gains and property taxes than in OECD generally, whereas the proportion deriving from payroll taxes, VAT, and other taxes on goods and services correspond to the OECD average.

According to OECD, Denmark had the highest tax to GDP ratio of all its member countries in 2021 with a ratio of 47,4%. This is partly due to various tax-funded social transfer schemes such as pensions and unemployment benefits also being taxable when received by beneficiaries. Additionally, due to the Danish universal welfare model, most Danish welfare schemes are tax funded as opposed to insurance-based, being calculated as a percentage of one's income tax instead of a lump sum contribution.

Professor of Economics at Princeton University Henrik Kleven has suggested that three distinct principles of policies in Denmark and its Scandinavian neighbours imply that the high tax rates cause only relatively small distortions to the economy: widespread use of third-party information reporting for tax collection purposes (ensuring a low level of tax evasion), broad tax bases (ensuring a low level of tax avoidance), and a strong subsidization of goods that are complementary to working (ensuring a high level of labour force participation).
