= Taxation in Georgia (country) =

Taxes in Georgia are collected on both national and local levels. The most important taxes are collected on national level, these taxes include an income tax, corporate taxes and value added tax. On local level property taxes as well as various fees are collected. There are 6 flat tax rates in Georgia: corporate profit tax, value added tax, excise tax, personal income tax, import tax and property tax.

Personal income tax in Georgia are collected at a flat rate of 20% on local-source income. Foreign-source personal income is tax-exempt. However, the definition of "foreign-source" is widely mis-represented, and further reading of the tax code reveals that income from abroad, earned through active work (on a laptop, for example) while physically present in Georgia, would be considered Georgian-source even if said income was never remitted to Georgia or derives from a foreign source. Personal income tax for interest, dividend and royalty is 5%. There are few allowances deductible.

Value-added tax (VAT) is collected at a flat rate of 18%.There are few exceptions, nearly all goods and services are subject to VAT. Medical care, exports and education are exempt from VAT. Regardless of turnover a taxpayer have to register for VAT if it produces or imports goods. Turnovers of less than 100,000 GEL is exempt.

Corporate taxes are levied at a flat rate of 15%, which was enacted in 2008. From 2017 onward, non-distributed profits are exempt from taxation. Very few deductions are accessible. This system was set up to attract foreign investment. Furthermore, excise taxes are on some luxury and environmentally damaging goods, such as gasoline. Customs apply to some imported goods, too. Only six different taxes apply.

Corporate profit tax	Value added tax (VAT)	Excise tax	Personal income tax (local income)	Personal income tax (foreign income)	Import tax	Property tax	Property sell tax
15%	18%	On few selected goods	20%	Tax exempt (in limited cases, see below)	0%, 5%, 12%	Up to 1%	5%

== Special Tax Regimes ==
=== Free Industrial Zone Entities ===
Free Industrial Zone entities are created for production / manufacturing, processing, provision of any kind of services within Free Industrial Zone. Therefore, their aim is to create a platform for manufacturing, processing of goods and their export from Georgia.

Free Industrial Zone entities are exempt from almost all taxes within the income received from mentioned eligible activities. Namely, if conditions are met - Free Industrial Zone entities might be subject to 0% tax on Corporate Income Tax, 0% Dividend tax, 0% Property tax, 0% Import tax and 0% VAT, 0% Reverse Charge VAT.

=== Entities with international company Status ===
New type of International Company status was introduced in 2020, changing the old status of International Financial Company. New International Company status gives reduced tax rates for eligible entities. In order to obtain respective status the company shall either itself has been providing allowed activities for a period of more than 2 years, or the company whose representative it is.

==== Permitted activities for IT sector ====
In IT sector, the enterprise has the right to render the activities listed below:

- Software release;

- Releasing of computer games;

- Releasing of other software;

- Computer programming, consulting and related activities;

- Computer programming activities;

- Consulting activities in the field of computer technology;

- Computer management activities;

- Other activities related to information technologies and computer services;

- Other activities in IT sector:

- production and / or delivery of digital products, including software support and delivery of updated versions of software;
- website development and / or delivery;
- web hosting, remote maintenance of software and hardware;
- software and related updates;
- provide images, texts and information to ensure access to a database;
- remote system administration;
- online delivery of allocated memory capacity;
- grant access to or download software (including purchasing / accounting software or antivirus software) and updates;
- Banner ads blocking programs;
- download drivers, such as software that connects computers to peripherals (such as a printer);
- automatic online installation of filters on websites;
- automatic online installation of firewalls.

==== Permitted Activities for Maritime Industry ====
Permitted Activities for Enterprises in maritime sector are commercial and maintenance services by a shipowner and / or those related to ship-ownership, including:

- ship rental with or without a crew (bareboat charter)
- route planning and / or analysis;
- giving route instructions to a ship's captain as agreed with the charterer of vessels;
- the counting of stallia, disbursement report analysis and management;
- managing disputes over cargo-related claims, commercial and legal issues, and written chartering agreements;
- organizing new shipbuilding orders and / or the service of buying and selling used ships;
- supervising the physical condition of a ship and / or supplying a ship with relevant technical parts and/or food products;
- coordinating shipbuilding, ship docking and repair activities, and conducting inspections in accordance with the requirements of industry regulators;
- ensuring compliance with the ISM Code, an international standard for the safe management and operation of ships and for pollution prevention, with the requirements of state control over flags and ports, and with the rules of a classification association.

==== Tax rates ====
The following tax incentives are set by Georgian Tax Code for international companies:

- Corporate income tax: 5% (instead of regular 15%),
- Employees' personal income tax: 5% (instead of regular 20%),
- Withholding tax on dividends: 0% (instead of regular 5%),
- Property tax (other than land): exempted, in case the property is used only for the activities allowed under the status (instead of regular percentage which is up to 1% depending on type of the property and the exemption does not include property tax on lands).

== Real Estate Taxes ==
Property owners in Georgia are subject to the following taxes:

- Property tax
- Income tax
- VAT (in some cases)

=== Property tax ===
Anyone who owns a property (real estate or movable property) and whose income from the Georgian sources exceeds 40,000 Georgian Laris have to pay an annual property tax which in most cases is 1% of the market value of the property.

=== Income tax on real estate in Georgia ===
Income tax is paid in two different cases:

1. When the owner of the real estate sells the property within two years from the buying, your income from the sale is subject to a 5% tax. Income is determined as the difference between the purchase and the selling price. If the owner sells property after two years, no income tax is applied.
2. When the owner of the property rents out the real estate 5% tax on rent (if rented for a living purposes). To do so, you need to register with the Tax Service Portal and obtain a taxpayer identification number. Otherwise, you will be required to pay 20% of the difference between your income and expenses, as well as a penalty. Renting out commercial real estate is subject to a 20% tax on the difference between income and expenses.

=== VAT on real estate ===
==== Rental ====
In case rental income for the last 12 months exceeds 100,000 GEL, then the owner of the properties are subject to mandatory VAT payer registration and will need to pay VAT for the income you generate from the rent.

==== Sale ====
VAT on selling apartment is paid only in case the property owner sell as a business. Meaning that buying and selling apartments is a business. For individuals selling their real estate, there's no VAT registration or pay obligation.
