= Sibebe Survivor =

Annual hike in Eswatini

Coordinates: 26.154098°S 31.101722°E

- Date: July
- Location: Mbuluzi, Eswatini
- Event type: scenic walk/run
- Distance: 10K
- Established: 2004
- Website: www.sibebe.co.sz

Sibebe Survivor is an annual hike in Mbuluzi, Eswatini, involving a climb to the top of Sibebe, the world's second largest single granite monolith. Initiated by the Rotary Club of Mbabane-Mbuluzi in July 2004, the Sibebe Survivor hike follows a course from Mbuluzi High School to the top of the rock and back.

The number of participants has increased annually, with almost 3,300 climbers in 2011. Due to growing interest in the event, a website has been created for online registration to avoid long queues on registration day. People from all around the world are motivated to join in the annual climb of Sibebe Rock, which is always scheduled for the last Sunday in July. In 2012, the climb was even undertaken by an amputee using his wheelchair and crutches. In 2011, the event raised over 501 thousand Emalangeni (Swazi currency), equivalent to approximately 50,000 Euros.

Participants are required to carry at least 1 litre of water, which is supplied at the start of the hike. The Rotary Club also provides a pre-hike breakfast and presents participants with certificates and prizes afterwards.

== Details of the event ==
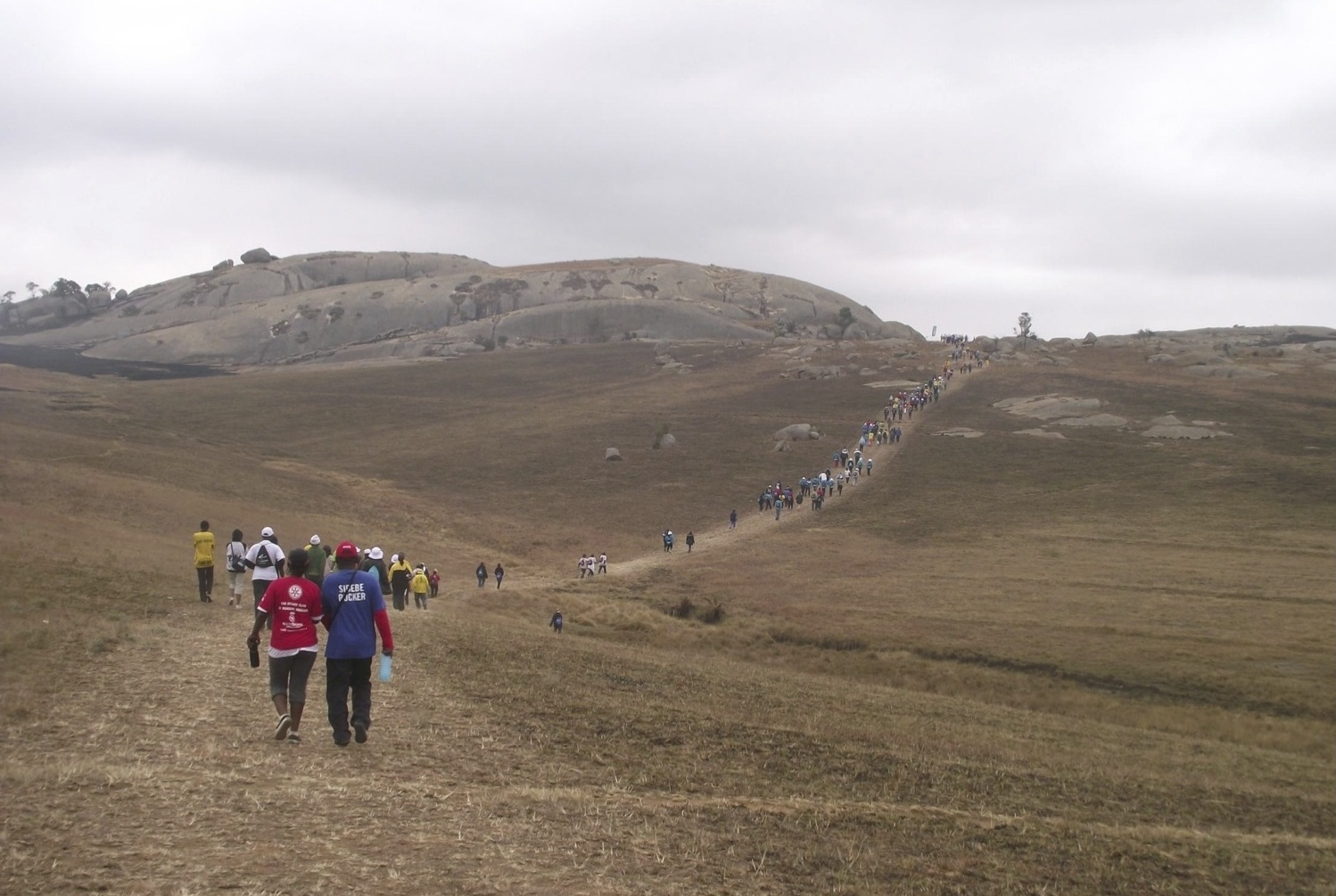
Thousands of participants walk up to Sibebe Rock

"Sibebe Rock", an 800-meter-high monolith in Eswatini, is the second largest exposed monolith in the world (after Ayers Rock in central Australia).

The Sibebe Survivor walk is a 10 km walk that starts from Mbuluzi High School, where participants can park their cars. Hikers climb the rock in an average time of 3 or 4 hours. Though Sibebe Survivor is a race, most of the participants just come to enjoy the views from Sibebe Rock and help people in need. The funds raised by the event are used to finance Rotary Foundation projects such as the distribution of wheelchairs and support for government hospitals. There is no cash reward for the winner of the race. The number of participants has gradually increased since the event was first held in July 2004. Whereas 1,500 hikers made the climb in 2008, the 2011 event drew 3,284 hikers. In 2012, the Rotary club limited the number of participants to a maximum of 4,000 people in order to limit the event's impact on the environment.

Sibebe Survivor is not only a walk but a popular social event in Eswatini. Some activities are prepared before the run, such as parties in restaurants and clubs. For example, in 2011, the event featured an African night at the Greans Restaurant where African food was served and people were allowed to compete at playing drums. DJ Toxik provided lively dance music. The many other parties organized in clubs included a Sibebe Survivor Party featuring DJ Cybos at House on Fire. By means of these warm-up parties and Facebook ads, participation in the hike is encouraged.

== Location ==
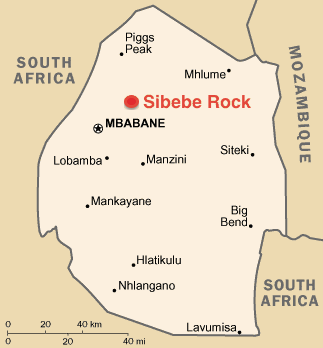
Location of Sibebe Rock

The Sibebe Survivor event allows many people to discover the remarkable Sibebe Rock, which remains relatively unknown outside of Eswatini due to a decline in foreign tourism in the post-apartheid era. Rising 1,378 meters above sea level, Sibebe Rock is the second largest rock in the world. In Eswatini, it is commonly compared to the Uluru Rock, or Ayers Rock, in Australia. However, the Sibebe rock is much older, having an estimated age of 3 billion years. According to the archaeologist Peter Beaumont, some artifacts discovered in the late 20th century in caves of the Sibebe valley also date from the Middle Ages. The valley has an altitude of 1,400 meters. A unique Swazi beer, Sibebe Lager, has also been named after Sibebe Rock, honoring it as a symbol of Eswatini.

== History ==
The annual Sibebe Survivor event began in 2004 under the leadership of Dudu Dhlamini of the International Rotary Club of Mbabane-Mbuluzi. His main purpose was to raise money for various community projects in Mbuluzi, Eswatini. For example, they have helped children from Fonteyn Primary School to buy school uniforms, financed free eye-testing for Swazi citizens, and donated wheelchairs to people who could not afford them in rural towns. They have also financed projects for deaf people, helped provide scholarships for OVCs (Orphans and Vulnerable Children), and supported causes such as breast cancer.

== Organization ==
=== Participants ===
Anyone can participate in the climb, with hikers ranging in age from children to elderly people. In 2011, the oldest participant was 76 years old. At the end of the event, participants are ranked either by groups or individually. Recognition is given in various categories, such as to the oldest and youngest participants, for cultural distinctions such as “Best National Dress,”, and for the largest team registered by one company.

=== Sponsors ===
Sibebe Survivor is sponsored by various companies, each donating some of their products to the Sibebe Survivor Challenge.

- Money: Nedbank, Eswatini Beverages and Eswatini Electricity company (EEC)
- Adverts: The Swazi Times, The Eswatini Observer and Eswatini TV
- Water and other drinks: Eswatini Beverages, Water Corporation and Sibebe Lager
- Goody bags: Real Image
- Food: Fedics
- Tents: Grand Air Investments
- T-shirts: Dixies
- Transport: African Distributors
