= Network of Tax Organizations =

Network of Tax Organisations

Network of Tax Organisations
- Abbreviation: NTO
- Formation: August 2018
- Type: NGO
- Headquarters: Bonn, Germany
- Region served: Worldwide
- Members: Regional tax organizations
- Main organ: Secretariat
- Website: www.nto.tax

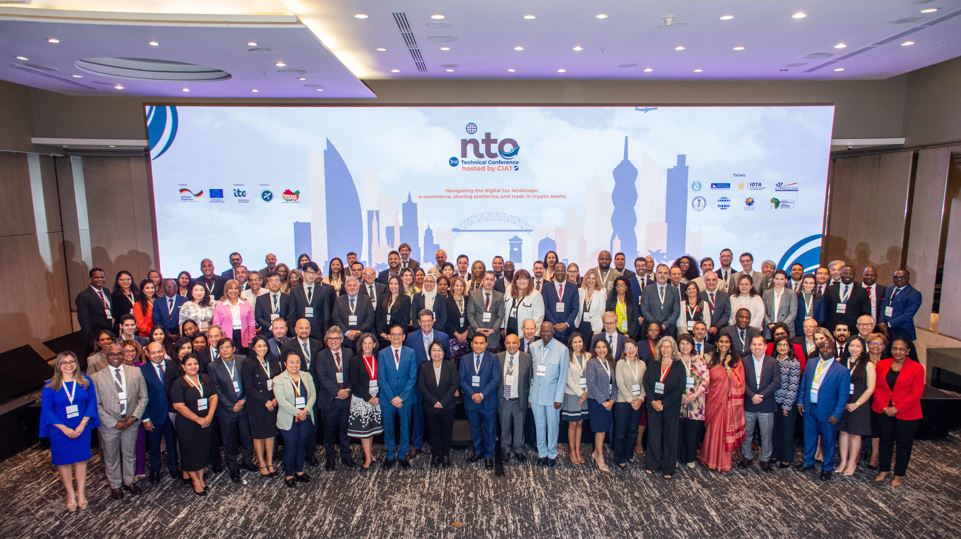
Network of Tax Organizations, Biannual assembly in Panama City, 18-20 February 2025

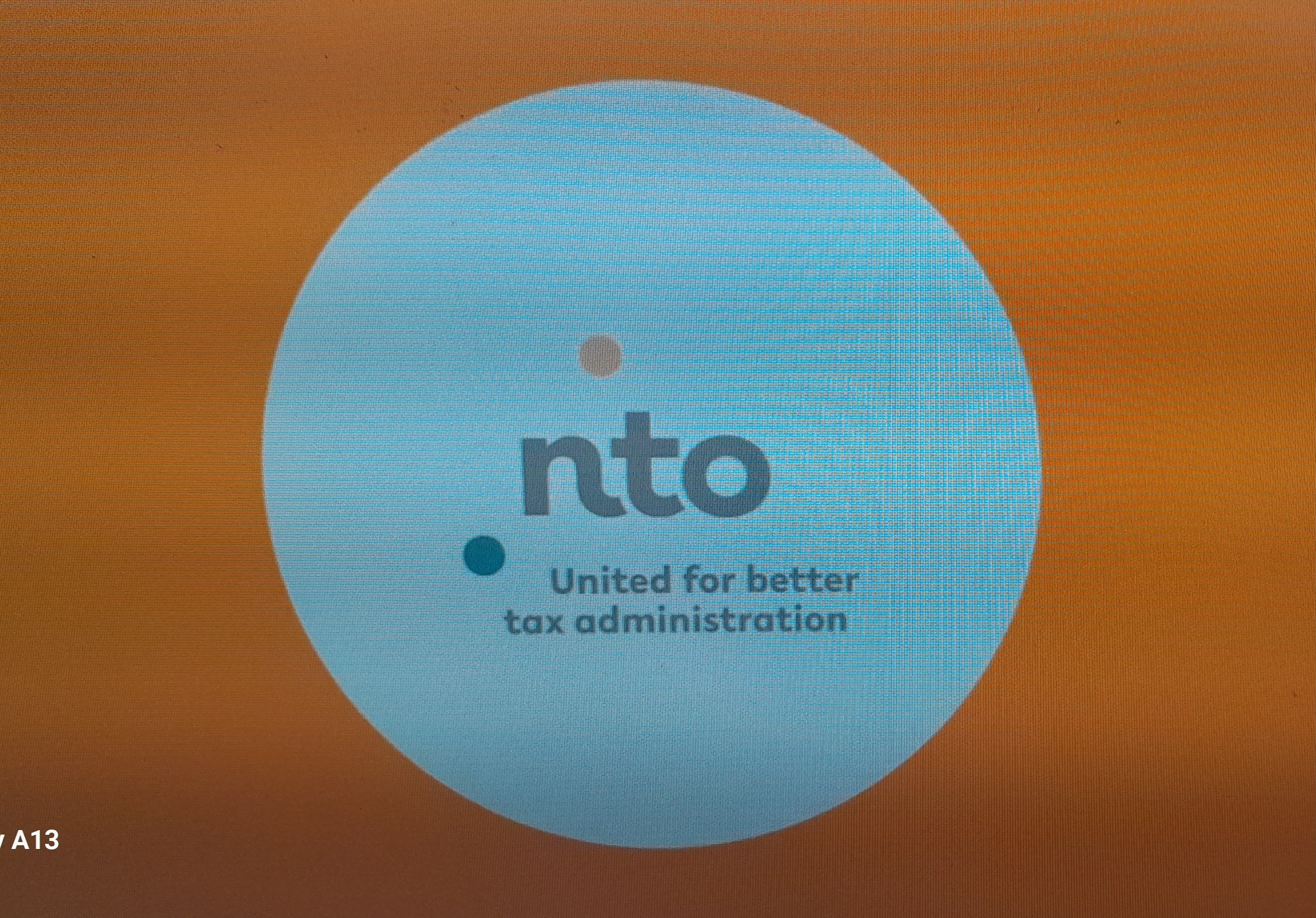
Network of Tax Administrations logo

The Network of Tax Organisations (NTO), is a non-profit intergovernmental organisation, which provides a forum to assist Regional Tax Organizations to improve their functionality. The NTO Secretariat is located in Bonn, Germany.

== Factsheet ==
The Network of Tax Organisations (NTO) is a network of regional and international tax organisations that aims to develop a global platform to strengthen tax systems around the world and improve coordination between member countries. The NTO was founded in May 2018 in Ottawa, Canada, and brings together 10 member organisations that represent over 180 national tax administrations worldwide. Jointly, NTO aims to develop the capacity of NTO members and foster international collaboration and dialogue on tax in support of effective Domestic Revenue Mobilisation (DRM).

== Activities and Publications ==
In August 2024, a comprehensive Data Governance course, including translations of the "Data Governance for Tax Administrations: A Practical Guide" manual into French and Spanish, and three online events were held by the NTO to further knowledge through practical case studies and real-time exchanges with international experts.

On 18-20 February 2025, the NTO Technical Conference took place in Panama City, Panama. The three-day Conference of the Network of Tax Organisations (NTO), under the theme “Navigating the digital tax landscape: E-commerce, sharing platforms, and trade in crypto assets”, allowed international tax experts and tax administrations worldwide to discuss these challenges, share experiences, and explore practical approaches The NTO Presidency is now chaired by the Commonwealth Association of Tax administrators (CATA) for the period 2025-2026.

== Structure and funding ==
NTO membership is voluntary. The main governing bodies of the NTO are the NTO Assembly, the NTO Council, the Head of Council, the Focal Points, the Working Groups, and the NTO Secretariat. The NTO Secretariat is facilitated by the International Tax Compact (ITC) which is funded by the German Federal Ministry for Economic Cooperation and Development (BMZ) and co-funded by the European Union. The ITC is implemented by the Deutsche Gesellschaft für Internationale Zusammenarbeit (GIZ) GmbH.

== Membership ==
The following organizations are full members of the Network of Tax Administrations:

- African Tax Administration Forum (ATAF)
- Association of Tax Authorities of Islamic Countries (ATAIC)
- Caribbean Organization of Tax Administrators (COTA)
- Inter-American Center of Tax Administrations (CIAT)
- Cercle de Réflexion et d'Échange des Dirigeants des Administrations Fiscales (CREDAF)
- Commonwealth Association of Tax Administrators (CATA)
- Intra-European Organisation of Tax Administrations (IOTA)
- Pacific Islands Tax Administrators Association (PITAA)
- Study Group on Asia-Pacific Tax Administration and Research (SGATAR)
- West African Tax Administration Forum (WATAF)

== See also ==
- Inter-American Center of Tax Administrations
- Intra-European Organisation of Tax Administrations
- List of countries by tax rates
- List of countries by tax revenue to GDP ratio
