= Sibebe =

Granite mountain in Swaziland, second-largest monolith in the world

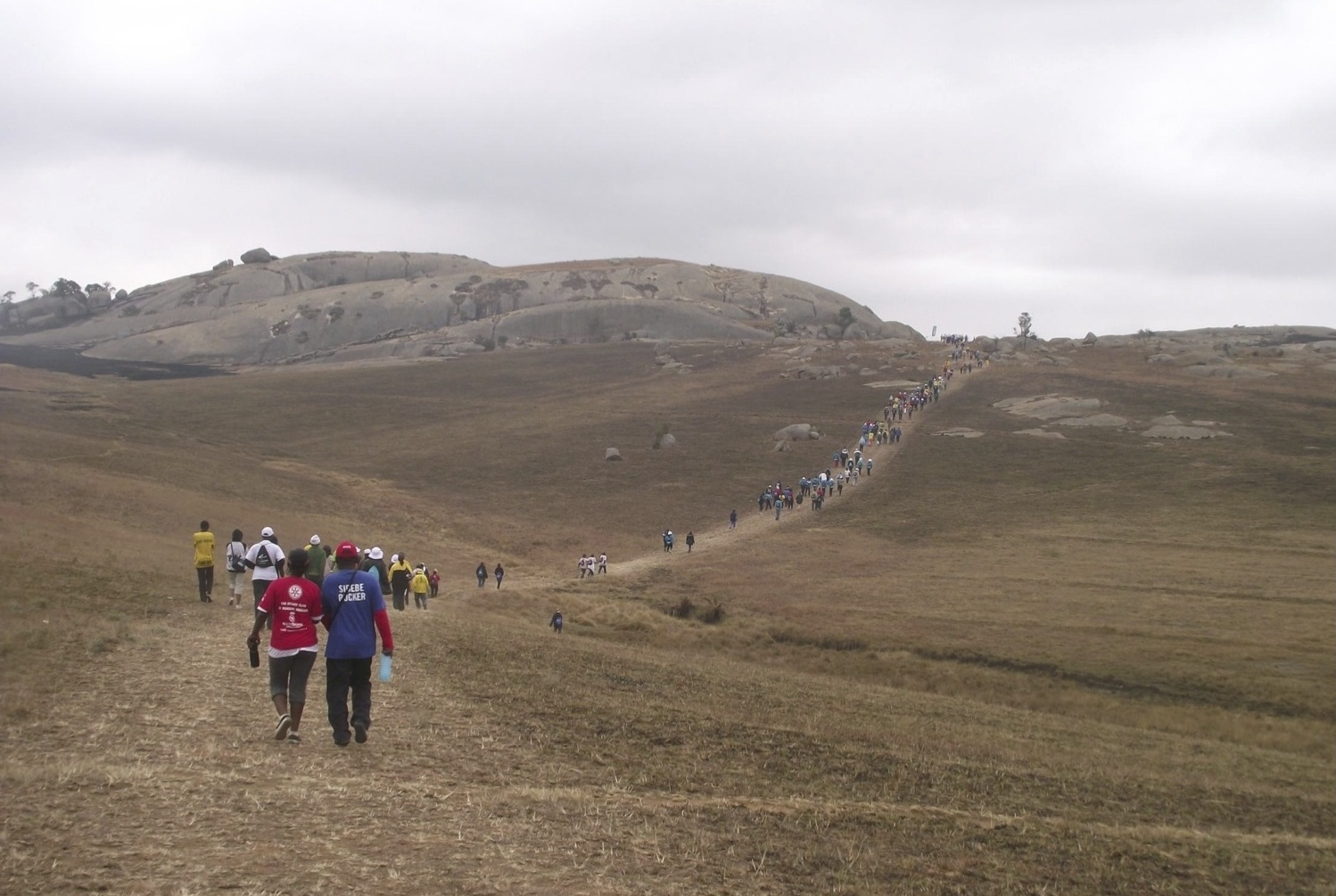
Hikers on the Sibebe Survivor walk

Sibebe is a granite mountain in Eswatini, located 10 km from the capital city Mbabane. It is the second-largest monolith in the world and the largest exposed granite pluton, rising 350m above the valley of the Mbuluzi River. It is also known as 'Bald Rock'.

The Mbabane-Mbuluzi Rotary Club organises an annual fund-raising walk up Sibebe Rock, called the Sibebe Survivor. Several thousand people take part each year.

Sibebe also gives its name to a lager produced by Eswatini Beverages Ltd, called Sibebe Premium Lager.
