= Economy of America (disambiguation) =

Economy of America comprises the economy of the United States of America.

Economy of America may also refer to:

- Economy of the Americas, comprises the economies on all sovereign countries located on the American continent
- Economy of North America, comprises the economies of all sovereign countries geographically located in North America, Central America, and the Caribbean
- Economy of South America, comprises the economies of all sovereign countries geographically located in South America
