= Mick Moore (political economist) =

British political economist

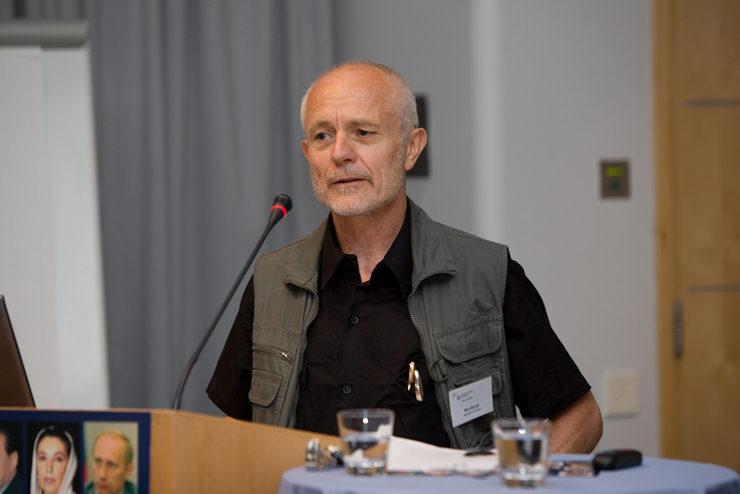
- Occupation: political economist
- Children: 2

Philosophical work
- Institutions: Institute of Development Studies, International Centre for Tax and Development
- Main interests: Governance, Public policy, State-building, Economic inequality, Tax reform

Mick Moore is a political economist and professorial fellow at the Institute of Development Studies at the University of Sussex. He is also the founding CEO of the International Centre for Tax and Development.

== Awards and honours ==
- 2021: Professor Moore has been appointed as an Officer of the Most Excellent Order of the British Empire (OBE) in the New Year 2021 Honours List for his services to international development.

== Research ==
Moore has conducted field research in Asia and Africa, particularly Sri Lanka, India, and Taiwan, and has taught at the Massachusetts Institute of Technology. He was previously the director of the Centre for the Future State, and is a member of the OECD Task Force on Tax and Development. His main research interests are the domestic and international dimensions of good and bad governance in developing countries, particularly those relating to taxation. He focuses on the process by which widening the tax base in low-income countries can help foster a social contract between citizens and the government through associated demands for public services. In contrast to receiving revenue from foreign aid or natural resources, governments who rely on taxes have to bargain with their citizens, and have incentives to promote their prosperity, thereby enhancing good governance. As an expert on these issues, he has been called several times to speak as a witness for the UK Parliament International Development Committee.

His book Taxing Africa: Coercion, Reform and Development was published by Zed Books in July 2018. Co-authored with Wilson Prichard and Odd-Helge Fjeldstad, the book offers a comprehensive and accessible introduction to the crucial debates around taxation and development in Africa. It examines issues from tax evasion by multinational corporations and African elites to how ordinary people navigate complex webs of ‘informal’ local taxation, examining the challenges and the potential for reform.

== Scholarly work ==
Mick Moore has published extensively on the issue of governance in the developing world, and his work has been widely cited, demonstrated by his h-index of 48 on Google Scholar.

=== Selected publications ===
- Mick, Moore; Brautigam, Deborah; Fjeldstad, Odd-Helge (2008). Taxation and State-Building in Developing Countries: Capacity and Consent. Cambridge University Press. ISBN 9780521888158.
- Moore, M. & Justino, P. (2015). Inequality: Trends, Harms, and New Agendas. Institute of Development Studies Evidence Report 144.
- Moore, M., Fjeldstad, H. O., Isaksen, J., Lundstøl, O., McCluskey, R. and Prichard, W.(2015) "Building Tax Capacity in Developing Countries" IDS Policy Briefing 96
- Moore, M. (2014). Revenue Reform and Statebuilding in Anglophone Africa. World Development, 60, 99-112.
- Moore, M. (2014). Will Changes to the International Tax System Benefit Low-Income Countries? IDS Rapid Response Briefing 6
- Moore, M. (2013) "Obstacles to Increasing Tax Revenues in Low Income Countries" ICTD Working Paper 15
- Moore, M. (2011). The governance agenda in long term perspective: globalisation, revenues and the differentiation of states. IDS Working Papers, 2011(378), 1-35.
- Mathew, S., & Moore, M. (2011). State incapacity by design: Understanding the Bihar story. IDS Working Papers, 2011(366), 1-31.
- Fjeldstad, O. H., & Moore, M. (2009). Revenue authorities and public authority in sub-Saharan Africa. The Journal of Modern African Studies, 47(01), 1-18.
- Moore, M. (2008). Between coercion and contract: competing narratives on taxation and governance. Taxation and state-building in developing countries, 34-63.
- Mick, Moore (2008). The State and Peasant Politics in Sri Lanka. Cambridge University Press. ISBN 9780521047760.
- Moore, M., & Schmitz, H. (2008). Idealism, realism and the investment climate in developing countries. IDS Working Paper 307.
- Fjeldstad, O. H., & Moore, M. (2008). Tax reform and state building in a globalized world. Taxation and State-Building in Developing Countries: Capacity and Consent, 235-260.
- Moore, M. (2007). How does taxation affect the quality of governance? IDS Working Paper 280.
- Acharya, A., De Lima, A. T. F., & Moore, M. (2006). Proliferation and fragmentation: Transactions costs and the value of aid. The journal of development studies, 42(1), 1-21.
- Moore, Mick; Reis, Elisa, eds. (2005). Elite Perceptions of Poverty and Inequality. Zed Books. ISBN 9781842776391.
- Lledo, V., Schneider, A., & Moore, M. (2004). Governance, taxes, and tax reform in Latin America. IDS Working Paper 221
- Joshi, A., & Moore, M. (2004). Institutionalised co-production: unorthodox public service delivery in challenging environments. Journal of Development Studies, 40(4), 31-49.
- Moore, M. (2004). Revenues, state formation, and the quality of governance in developing countries. International Political Science Review, 25(3), 297-319.
- Acharya, A., Fuzzo de Lima, A., & Moore, M. (2004). Aid Proliferation: how responsible are the donors? IDS Working Paper 214
- Hossain, N., & Moore, M. (2002). Arguing for the poor: elites and poverty in developing countries, IDS Working Paper 148.
- Moore, M. (2001). Political Underdevelopment: What causes ‘bad governance’. Public Management Review, 3(3), 385-418.
- Joshi, A., & Moore, M. (2000). Enabling environments: Do anti-poverty programmes mobilise the poor?. Journal of Development Studies, 37(1), 25-56.
- Moore, M., Leavy, J., Houtzager, P., & White, H. (1999). Polity qualities: How governance affects poverty.
- Moore, M., & Putzel, J. (1999). Thinking strategically about politics and poverty. CIIR.
- Moore, M. (1990). Economic liberalization versus political pluralism in Sri Lanka?. Modern Asian Studies, 24(02), 341-383.
- Moore, M. (1984). Institutional development, the World Bank, and India's new agricultural extension programme. The Journal of Development Studies, 20(4), 303-317.
- Dyson, T., & Moore, M. (1983). On kinship structure, female autonomy, and demographic behavior in India. Population and Development Review, 35-60.
