= African Tax Administration Forum =

- Abbreviation: ATAF
- Formation: August 2008
- Type: IGO
- Headquarters: Pretoria, South Africa
- Region served: Africa
- Executive Secretary: Logan Wort
- Main organ: Secretariat
- Staff: 26
- Website: ataftax.org

Map of Africa, with members of the African Tax Administration Forum highlighted in green.

The African Tax Administration Forum (ATAF) is an international organisation which provides a platform for cooperation among African tax authorities. First conceived during a meeting of 30 African tax commissioners with representatives of the Organisation for Economic Co-operation and Development in August 2008, it was launched in November 2009 in Kampala, Uganda. Through mutual cooperation between member states, ATAF works towards increasing the level of voluntary tax compliance whilst combating tax evasion and avoidance. ATAF is supported by a group of donors including the UK's Department for International Development, the Norwegian Agency for Development Cooperation, the African Development Bank, the Deutsche Gesellschaft für Internationale Zusammenarbeit, Irish Aid, the Ministry for Foreign Affairs (Finland), the Ministry of Foreign Affairs (Netherlands), the OECD, and the Swiss State Secretariat for Economic Affairs. It collaborates with African regional economic organisations, the Commonwealth Association of Tax Administrations, the Inter-American Center of Tax Administrations, the Centre de Rencontres et d'Etudes des Dirigeants des Administrations Fiscales, the Intra-European Organisation of Tax Administrations, and the International Centre for Tax and Development.

== Member nations ==
As of October 2015, there are 37 member nations:

- Angola
- Benin
- Botswana
- Burkina Faso
- Burundi
- Cameroon
- Chad
- Comoros
- Côte d'Ivoire
- Egypt
- Eritrea
- Gabon
- Ghana
- Kenya
- Lesotho
- Liberia
- Madagascar
- Malawi
- Mauritania
- Mauritius
- Mozambique
- Namibia
- Niger
- Nigeria
- Rwanda
- Senegal
- Seychelles
- Sierra Leone
- South Africa
- Sudan
- Swaziland
- Tanzania
- The Gambia
- Uganda
- Zambia
- Zimbabwe

== Capacity building ==
ATAF offers an online course in tax treaties as well as an executive master's in taxation, in partnership with two Senegalese schools and the Mauritius Revenue Authority. It also offers short courses on taxation and development in partnership with the International Centre for Tax and Development. In 2015, ATAF launched the African Tax Research Network (ATRN), which will hold an annual congress for researchers to share their work. In collaboration with the International Centre for Tax and Development, it will also offer research methods training and dissemination workshops to members of the ATRN.

== Technical working groups ==
ATAF hosts technical working groups on Base Erosion and Profit Shifting, Indirect Taxes, Exchange of Information, and Transfer pricing. In April 2015 it held a consultative conference on BEPS, and provided feedback from its members to the OECD. On exchange of information, ATAF has begun a three-year pilot program which aims to help African countries meet the standards to join the Global Forum on Transparency and Exchange of Information for Tax Purposes.

== Conferences ==
In October 2015, ATAF held its second international conference on tax in Africa, with the theme "Tax Compliance and Limiting Illicit financial flows".
