= Eswatini Revenue Service =

- ERS Logo

Agency overview
- Formed: 2008
- Jurisdiction: Government of Eswatini
- Headquarters: Portion 419 of Farm 50, Along MR103, Ezulwini, Eswatini
- Minister responsible: Minister of Finance
- Agency executive: Brightwell Nkambule, Commissioner General
- Parent department: Ministry of Finance
- Website: ers.org.sz

The Eswatini Revenue Service (ERS) is the revenue administration agency of the Kingdom of Eswatini. It administers the country's tax system and customs service, and enforces compliance with related legislation. It is governed by the Revenue Authority Act No. 1 of 2008 (as amended), which established it as a semi-autonomous body operating within the broad framework of government but outside the civil service. The ERS is structured as a corporate entity and is headed by a Commissioner General, with oversight provided by a Governing Board appointed by the Minister of Finance.

== Overview ==
The ERS is mandated to assess and collect all revenue on behalf of the government, administer and give effect to the laws set out in its enabling legislation, promote compliance with revenue laws, and take measures to counteract tax and revenue fraud and evasion. It ensures that all revenue collected is credited, as soon as reasonably practicable, to the Eswatini Government General Account.

Its headquarters is located at Portion 419 of Farm 50, along MR103, in Ezulwini. The organisation operates Monday to Friday, from 8am to 5pm.

== History and Establishment ==
The ERS was established through the Revenue Authority Act No. 1 of 2008, under the name Swaziland Revenue Authority, and began operations in May 2010. Unlike a conventional government department, it was designed to function as a semi-autonomous corporate entity outside the civil service, affording it a significant degree of operational independence while remaining under the policy oversight of the Minister of Finance.

Dumisani Masilela served as the founding Commissioner General from May 2010, leading the organisation through its first decade of operations and guiding it through a period of sustained institutional development. He served for nearly 12 years — one of the longest tenures of any revenue authority chief executive in the region — before departing in March 2022 to join the International Monetary Fund as a Revenue Administration Specialist. He was subsequently appointed Executive Secretary of the Southern African Customs Union (SACU).

Brightwell Nkambule succeeded Masilela as Commissioner General in 2022. Under his leadership, the ERS has pursued an accelerated programme of digital transformation, voluntary compliance improvement, and institutional expansion. He was commended alongside Finance Minister Neal Rijkenberg by African Tax Administration Forum Executive Secretary Mary Baine for driving compliance rates from 61 percent to 66.6 percent.

== Functions ==
Under its enabling legislation, the main functions of the ERS are to:

- Assess and collect all revenue on behalf of the government
- Administer and give effect to applicable revenue laws
- Promote voluntary compliance with tax and customs obligations
- Counteract tax and revenue fraud and other forms of evasion
- Ensure all collected revenue is credited to the Government General Account
- Facilitate legitimate trade through customs service operations

The ERS administers several categories of tax, including income tax (personal and corporate), value-added tax (VAT), presumptive tax, withholding taxes, customs and excise duties, alcohol and tobacco levies, fuel tax, and employment-related levies such as Pay-As-You-Earn (PAYE).

In September 2025, the ERS formally expanded its mandate by taking over additional revenue collection responsibilities under the Second Schedule of the Revenue Act of 2008, consolidating government revenue operations previously managed by line ministries and the Treasury. Earlier phases of this expansion included collection of Trading Licence and Company Registration fees; Phase II brought remaining revenue laws from the Treasury under ERS management.

== Tax Administration ==
=== Income Tax ===
The ERS administers personal and corporate income tax in Eswatini. Key provisions include self-assessment returns, taxation of employee benefits in kind, retirement and redundancy benefits, part-time employment income, withholding taxes, and the taxation of diplomats and consular staff. Guidance is available for new businesses and for the appointment of public officers under income tax legislation.

=== Value Added Tax ===
VAT administration covers registration, exempt supplies, zero-rated goods and services, reverse charge mechanisms, and a VAT refund scheme operated in cooperation with South Africa. Taxpayers can verify VAT registration status through the ERS online portal.

=== Customs and Excise ===
The ERS manages Eswatini's customs and excise functions, including general import and export rules, customs tariffs, procedure codes, bonded warehouses, rebate stores, and free trade and preferential trade agreements. It also administers the Sekulula VAT tourist refund scheme, the Authorised Economic Operator programme, and participates in the EU Registered Exporter System. Customs offices and their operating hours are published on the ERS website.

In June 2026, the ERS and FNB Eswatini completed a payment integration that allows trade payments to reflect on client accounts in near real time within the ASYCUDA customs declaration system, making the declaration process faster and more convenient for traders. FNB Eswatini was the first bank to complete the integration, with further phases planned to cover domestic tax payments.

=== Practice Notes and Guidelines ===
The ERS issues practice notes to clarify the application of tax law. In March 2026, Commissioner General Brightwell Nkambule issued four draft Practice Notes, opened for public consultation ahead of their planned entry into force on 1 July 2026. These cover:

- Benefits in kind and allowances (Practice Note No. LEGAL-IT/01/23): Sets out how employer-provided benefits, including housing, company vehicles, domestic workers, utilities, educational assistance, soft loans, and medical contributions, are to be valued for inclusion in an employee's gross income. The note replaces Legal Notice No. 157 of 2007.
- Interest deductibility (Practice Note No. COM-IT/02/26): Limits interest deductions for companies within a group to 30 percent of tax EBITDA per year of assessment, with banking and insurance companies exempt. Undeducted interest may be carried forward for up to three years.
- Losses carried forward (Practice Note No. COM-IT/01/26): Provides that unexhausted losses lapse after five consecutive years of assessment and ring-fences losses by activity type. Exceptions apply to timber plantation farmers and orchard farmers.
- Retirement fund contributions (Practice Note No. COM-IT/03/26): Sets employee contribution rates at between five and 15 percent of pensionable salary, with employer contributions capped at 20 percent.

=== High-Net-Worth Individual Taxation ===
In June 2026, the ERS began working with experts from the African Tax Administration Forum (ATAF) to develop a dedicated framework for taxing high-net-worth individuals (HNWIs). ATAF specialists Paul Khanare and Michael Mwaura from the Kenya Revenue Authority worked alongside ERS to build a HNWI taxation framework tailored to Eswatini's economic and social context, covering the definition and identification of HNWIs, strengthening legal and administrative frameworks, improving taxpayer data use and compliance risk management, and developing a country-specific HNWI strategy. The mission followed the publication of ATAF's Guide to Implementing an Effective High-Net-Worth Individual Taxation Regime in Africa, which listed Eswatini as a case study country.

== Revenue Performance ==
Domestic tax collections in Eswatini have grown substantially over the past decade. In the 2025/26 financial year, the ERS recorded total domestic revenue of E15.72 billion, representing a 7.6 percent increase from the prior year and more than triple the E4.79 billion collected in 2012/13.

In the 2024/25 financial year, the ERS collected E14.61 billion, a 12.2 percent increase over the prior year and the second consecutive year the country surpassed its annual revenue target. The country's tax-to-GDP ratio grew from 15.9 percent to 16.7 percent during this period, surpassing the regional average. Finance Minister Neal Rijkenberg credited ERS's digital transformation and taxpayer education campaigns for making it easier for citizens to meet their obligations.

The 2023/24 financial year saw ERS collect E14.6 billion, its highest revenue growth since the COVID-19 era. Head of Business Development Strategy Edward Groening noted that the organisation had outperformed nominal GDP growth of 8.7 percent and credited improvements in voluntary compliance and the deployment of the new 'Tax Is' system. Trade facilitation also showed growth, with ERS handling E83 billion worth of goods through local borders and processing over 660,000 declarations during the year. The average declaration processing time fell from 29 to 28 minutes. The collection cost stood at just 3.34 cents for every Lilangeni collected.

During 2025/26, the ERS paid out E3.49 billion in refunds, of which E3.48 billion comprised VAT refunds and E6.37 million income tax refunds. Refund payments have grown year-on-year, from E2.53 billion in 2023/24 to E3.02 billion in 2024/25, before reaching E3.49 billion in 2025/26.

Southern African Customs Union (SACU) receipts, a major component of government revenue, declined by 20.4 percent in 2025/26, falling from E13.07 billion to E10.40 billion. The volatility of SACU income has reinforced the importance of domestically generated revenue as a more stable fiscal anchor.

=== Revenue Collections ===
Financial Year	Domestic Revenue (E' Billions)	Year-on-Year Growth
2012/13	4.79	
2023/24	14.60	—
2024/25	14.61	12.2%
2025/26	15.72	7.6%

=== Voluntary Compliance ===
Voluntary compliance has been a central measure of ERS performance. Compliance rates rose from 61 percent to 66.6 percent, a development commended by Mary Baine, Executive Secretary of the African Tax Administration Forum, at the ERS Client Appreciation Day in July 2025. Baine described the trend as evidence of growing trust between citizens and government.

The ERS recorded a Net Promoter Score of 83.96 percent for 2025/26, up from 77.3 percent the previous year and from 49.40 percent in 2022/23, reflecting sustained improvement in taxpayer satisfaction. The NPS had stood at just 6.7 percent at the start of the current improvement trajectory in 2022.

== Digital Transformation ==
The ERS has pursued an active agenda of digital transformation across its operations. The 'Tax Is' system was deployed to simplify compliance processes for taxpayers, contributing to the registration of 4,600 new taxpayers in 2023/24, with individuals making up nearly half of this figure. ERS also expanded its digital outreach, reaching over two million people through social media platforms and attracting 13,000 followers during the same period.

In June 2026, the ERS signed a Memorandum of Understanding with the University of Eswatini (UNESWA) for the UNESWA AI Academy to deliver a specialised institutional AI training programme for ERS employees. The programme is coordinated under the Faculty of Science and Engineering and is designed to equip staff with AI literacy, data skills, and the ethics and governance required for responsible AI adoption in a revenue administration environment. UNESWA Vice Chancellor Professor Justice M. Thwala, who co-signed the agreement, said the partnership was a timely step in preparing institutions for an AI-driven age.

== Service Delivery Expansion ==
In September 2025, the ERS launched a partnership with the Eswatini Posts and Telecommunications Corporation (EPTC) to expand revenue collection access points across the country. EPTC's network of over 30 post offices was designated as additional collection points under the initiative, with Phase I beginning on 20 October 2025 at 16 post offices across the country's four regions. The programme was designed to reduce travel for citizens, improve accessibility, and streamline revenue collection processes nationwide.

== Governance and Structure ==
The ERS is headed by the Commissioner General, who serves as the chief executive of the organisation. A Governing Board appointed by the Minister of Finance provides oversight. The Board's HR and Ethics Committees also receive reports from the Internal Affairs Division on fraud, corruption, and internal governance matters.

=== Commissioners General ===
Commissioner General	Start of Term	End of Term	Notes
Brightwell Nkambule	2022	Incumbent	
Dumisani Masilela	May 2010	March 2022	Founding Commissioner General; departed to join the International Monetary Fund as a Revenue Administration Specialist; subsequently appointed Executive Secretary of the Southern African Customs Union

== Organisational Values ==
The ERS is guided by five core values:

- Performance Excellence — striving for professionalism and continuous improvement
- Relationships — delivering high-level customer service and recognising the impact of actions on stakeholders
- Innovation — continuously implementing new ideas that re-engineer service delivery
- Integrity — promoting honesty, trust, and openness
- Transparency and Accountability — open operations and communication with responsibility for actions and decisions

== Internal Affairs ==
The Internal Affairs Division is charged with devising strategies to prevent and combat fraud and corruption within the ERS. It reports to the Commissioner General and, on matters of business risk and vulnerability, to the HR and Ethics Committees of the Governing Board.

The Division operates through three strategic pillars:

- Detection and Investigation — investigating internal fraud and corruption, with referrals to disciplinary processes or law enforcement as appropriate
- Integrity and Ethics Awareness — sensitising staff and the public on the dangers of corruption, and promoting whistleblowing platforms
- Corruption Preventative Oversight — regulating staff practices considered to carry ethical risk, including gifts, outside interests, and conflicts of interest

Whistleblowing channels include a toll-free line (800 000), Slido at www.slido.com with passcode 8008000, cellphone number 76063107, and a landline at 24048549.

== International Alliances and Agreements ==
The ERS is a member of several international organisations including the African Tax Administration Forum, the World Customs Organization, and the Commonwealth Association of Tax Administrators. It collaborates with the International Monetary Fund using the Tax Administration Diagnostic Assessment Tool to benchmark performance against other revenue administrations globally.

=== Double Taxation Agreements ===
Country
South Africa
United Kingdom
Mauritius
Seychelles
Taiwan (Republic of China)
Botswana
Lesotho

=== Tax Information Exchange Agreements ===
Territory
Isle of Man
States of Guernsey

=== Cooperation Agreements with Other Revenue Authorities ===
Country	Notes
South Africa	Includes VAT Refund Scheme
Mozambique	
Mauritius	
Lesotho	
Botswana	
Seychelles	
Tanzania	
Zimbabwe	

=== Multilateral Agreements ===
- African Tax Administration Forum Agreement on Mutual Assistance in Tax Matters
- SADC Agreement on Assistance in Tax Matters
- Multilateral Convention on Mutual Administrative Assistance in Tax Matters
- SADC Amended Protocol on Trade, Annex II — Customs Cooperation within SADC
- International Convention on Mutual Administrative Assistance for the Prevention, Investigation and Repression of Customs Offences

== Community and Regional Engagement ==
=== National Outreach ===
The ERS conducts public engagement through its Sondzela Sikhulume (meaning "come, let us talk") national outreach programme and a national debt outreach campaign, through which it engages taxpayers across the country on their obligations and available relief measures.

=== Client Appreciation Day ===
The ERS holds an annual Client Appreciation Day to recognise compliant taxpayers and report on performance. The event held at Happy Valley Hotel in Ezulwini in July 2025 featured the announcement of the 2024/25 revenue results and was attended by ATAF Executive Secretary Mary Baine, Finance Minister Neal Rijkenberg, and key stakeholders. Ubombo Sugar was recognised as the country's top taxpayer at the event.

=== Southern African Inter-Revenue Administration Games ===
The ERS participates in the Southern African Inter-Revenue Administration Games (SAIRAG), a multi-sport tournament bringing together revenue authorities from across the region, including Zambia, Lesotho, Botswana, Angola, South Africa, and Namibia. Following the conclusion of SAIRAG 2026 in Swakopmund, Namibia, held from 3 to 5 April 2026, the ERS was confirmed as the host of SAIRAG 2027. Zambia won the overall title at SAIRAG 2026, while Lesotho also had a strong showing with gold in darts and multiple podium finishes across athletics, volleyball, basketball, and tug of war.

== See also ==
- South African Revenue Service
- Southern African Customs Union
- African Tax Administration Forum
- Ministry of Finance, Eswatini
- University of Eswatini
