= Inter-American Center of Tax Administrations =

- Abbreviation: CIAT
- Established: 1967
- Type: International organization
- Headquarters: Panama City
- Products: CIATData, CIATalk, Digital News
- Services: Training, Technical Assistance
- Executive Secretary: Márcio F. Verdi
- Website: www.ciat.org

The Inter-American Center of Tax Administrations (CIAT) is an international organization specialized in training and exchanges of information between national tax administrations.

The CIAT is an international public, non-profit organization that provides specialized technical assistance for the updating and modernization of tax administrations. It is a founding member of the Network of Tax Organizations (NTO), a network of regional and international tax administrations that aims to develop and promote effective and fair tax systems around the world.

== Organization of international conferences ==
The CIAT holds its General Assembly in April of each year. This event brings together the tax administration authorities of all member and associate member countries and invited organizations, to discuss common challenges, share experiences and foster cooperation among member countries. In 2024, the event took place in Foz do Ignaciu (Brazil) on the theme "Mechanisms for the prevention and resolution of conflicts and promotion of voluntary compliance"

CIAT also organizes an annual international Technical Conference in October. The next scheduled Technical Conference, focused on "Avoidance and general anti-abuse rules: casuistry and tax justice", which will be held in Lima, Peru, on October 15-17, 2024.

== Member countries and partners ==
Created in 1967, the CIAT groups currently 42 member countries and associate member countries: 32 American countries, five European countries, four African countries and one Asian country. Angola, India, Morocco and Nigeria are associate member countries. CIAT is part of the International Tax Dialogue.

Members may be all those American countries that are invited to join or those whose application for membership is accepted by the General Assembly. There is a special category of "associate member". The General Assembly may accept as Associate Member countries non-American countries that request it and have the approval of the Executive Council.

=== Guidelines ===
- Organize cooperative events and activities that strengthen tax administrations through the exchange of experiences and good practices, in order to facilitate and promote voluntary compliance, combat fraud, tax evasion and avoidance.
- Develop and disseminate information, studies, research, innovative practices, and other products to improve tax policy and tax administration.
- Design, promote and execute training and human talent development activities in coordination with tax administrations.
- Develop internal management and external coordination policies for the institutional strengthening of CIAT.

== History ==
=== CIAT foundation ===
After a tour made in 1965 to the United States of America by authorities of tax administrations of American countries, to know and discuss the field of tax administration, Sheldon Cohen and Harold Moss, then respectively Commissioner and Director of the Office of International Assistance of the Internal Revenue Service of the United States, had the vision of creating an international organization to serve as a permanent forum for the consideration of the problems of tax administrations.

For this purpose, a Steering Committee was appointed to structure the foundations of a multilateral agency of tax administrators. At meetings held in 1965 and 1966, said Committee drafted the Statutes of the organization.

In May 1967, during the first General Assembly held in Panama, the Statutes of the Inter-American Center of Tax Administrators-CIAT were approved. In 1997, a change in the name of the Center was approved, becoming the Inter-American Center of Tax Administrations, to emphasize the institutional nature of the organization. Panama has remained the country hosting the Ciat's central office.

=== Evolution of CIAT's activities ===
Until 1977, CIAT's activities were mainly directed to the organization of international meetings (annual assembly, conferences and technical seminars), the publication of newsletters and the maintenance of a library specialized in tax issues. In that year, a Technical Cooperation Agreement was signed with the Federal Republic of Germany, which established a permanent mission to CIAT with significant benefits for the organization and its member countries. The Agreement was maintained until 1997 and facilitated CIAT's action in the field of technical assistance.

Technical cooperation agreements were concluded in 1982 and 1983 with France and Spain respectively. As a result, the permanent missions of these countries were established at CIAT headquarters in Panama. These agreements enabled CIAT to enhance activities for the benefit of its member countries. One product recently developed and adopted by various member countries is the e-IAD, an open-source electronic invoicing anomaly detector, developed in partnership with Microsoft.

In 1983, the Regional Technical Cooperation Project on the Single Register of Taxpayers and Current Account, TIN/CA, for Central America and the Caribbean, financed by IDB and executed by CIAT, was also launched. From there, our Center would act as a specialized agency providing technical assistance services for the tax administrations of Latin America and the Caribbean.

In 1987, during the General Assembly of Uruguay, the reform of the Statutes was approved. creating the category of Associate Members, to which Spain and Portugal joined in 1990, France in 1991, Italy in 1995 and the Netherlands in 1996.

The process of institutional evolution continued in the 90's: on the one hand, with the increasing use of information technology and management tools such as strategic planning, and, on the other hand, the approach and a greater commitment of european member countries, culminating in the year 2001 with the acquisition of the status of full members of five of them. Another notable event in the development of CIAT was the incorporation of South Africa in the Assembly of Bolivia in 2004, Kenya in the General Assembly of Brazil in 2006, and India in the General Assembly of Guatemala in 2009, as associate member countries.

The volume and scope of CIAT's activities, as well as the number of member countries and associate members from different continents, has expanded significantly since its creation, making CIAT the largest organization worldwide that brings together tax administrations and has signed cooperation agreements with international public and private entities specialized in tax matters, such as the nine organizations that make up the NTO, or the GIZ of Germany.

== Membership ==
CIAT member countries' tax administrations and associate member countries' tax administrations, include:

- Angola -Tax General Administration
- Argentina: Federal Administration of Public Revenues
- Aruba: Directorate of Taxes and Customs
- Barbados: Barbados Revenue Authority
- Belize: Income Tax Department
- Bermuda: Ministry of Finance
- Bolivia: Servicio de Impuestos Nacionale
- Brazil: Federal Revenues of Brazil
- Canada: Canada Revenue Agency
- Chile: Internal Revenue Service
- Colombia: Directorate of Taxes and National Customs
- Costa Rica: General Directorate of Taxation
- Cuba: National Tax Administration Office
- Curacao: Inspectorate of Taxes of Curacao
- Dominican Republic: General Directorate of Internal Taxes
- Ecuador: Internal Revenue Service
- El Salvador: General Directorate of Internal Taxes
- France: General Directorate of Public Finances
- Guatemala: Superintendency of Tax Administration
- Guyana: Guyana Revenue Authority
- Haiti: General Directorate of Taxes
- Honduras: Income Administration Service - SAR
- India: Ministry of Finance
- Italy: Guardia di Finanza
- Jamaica: Tax Administration Jamaica
- Kenya: Kenian Revenue Authority
- Mexico: Tax Administration Service
- Morocco: Ministry of Economy and Finance
- Netherlands: Ministry of Finance
- Nicaragua: General Directorate of Revenues
- Nigeria: Federal Inland Revenue Service
- Panama: General Directorate of Revenues
- Paraguay: State Undersecretariat of Taxation
- Peru: Customs and Tax Administration National Superintendency
- Portugal: Tax Customs Authority
- Spain: State Agency of Tax Administration
- Sint Maarten: Ministry of Finance
- Suriname: Directorate of Taxes
- Trinidad y Tobago: Inland Revenue Division
- United States of America: Internal Revenue Service
- Uruguay: General Directorate of Taxation
- Venezuela: Integrated National Service of Customs and Tax Administration

== See also ==
- Economy of the Americas
- Intra-European Organisation of Tax Administrations
- List of countries by tax rates
- List of countries by tax revenue to GDP ratio
- Network of Tax Organizations
