= Monolith =

Stone block made of one single piece; object made of one single rock piece

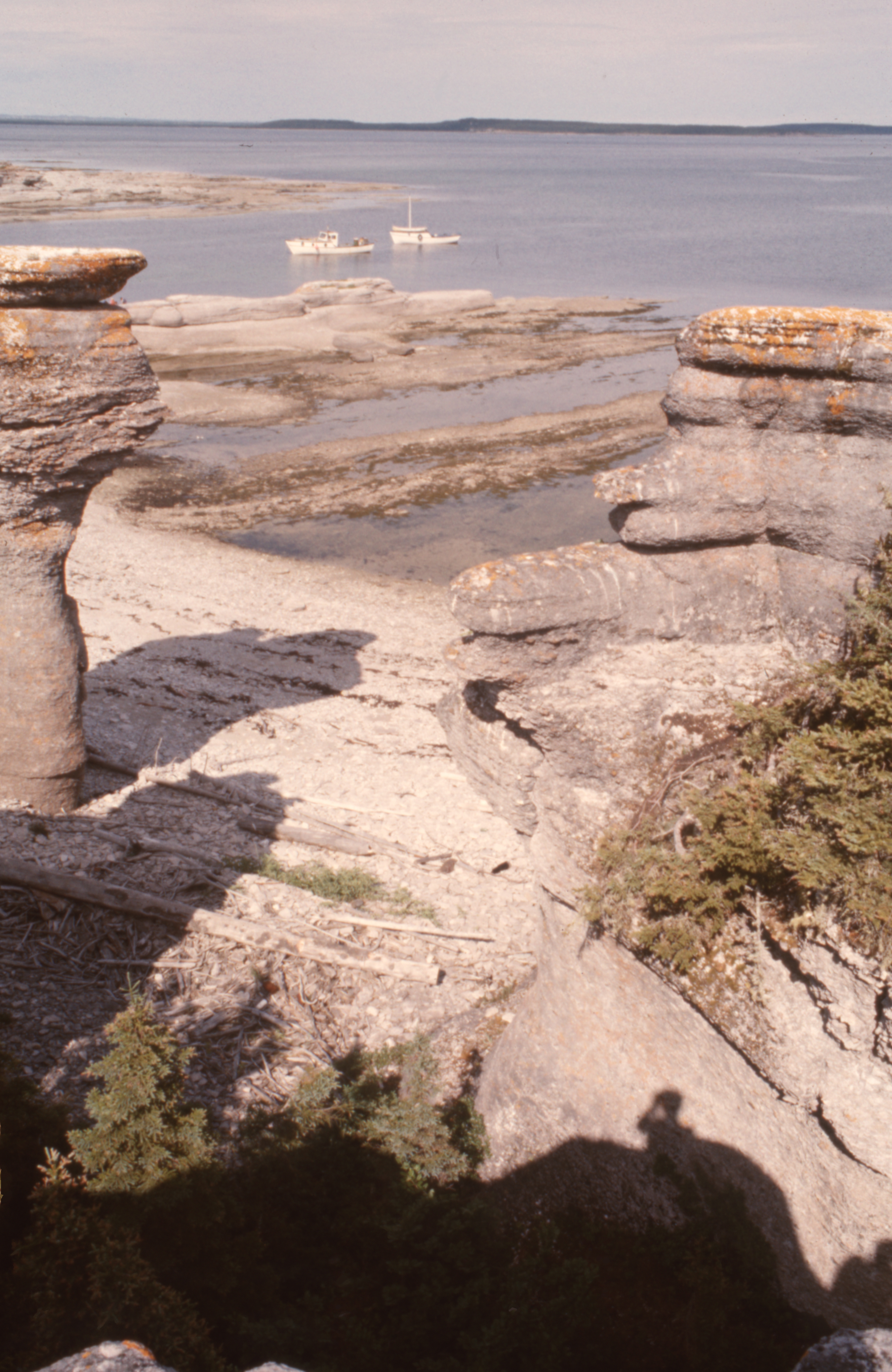
Niapiskau island, limestone monoliths, Gulf of St. Lawrence, Mingan Archipelago National Park Reserve, Canada

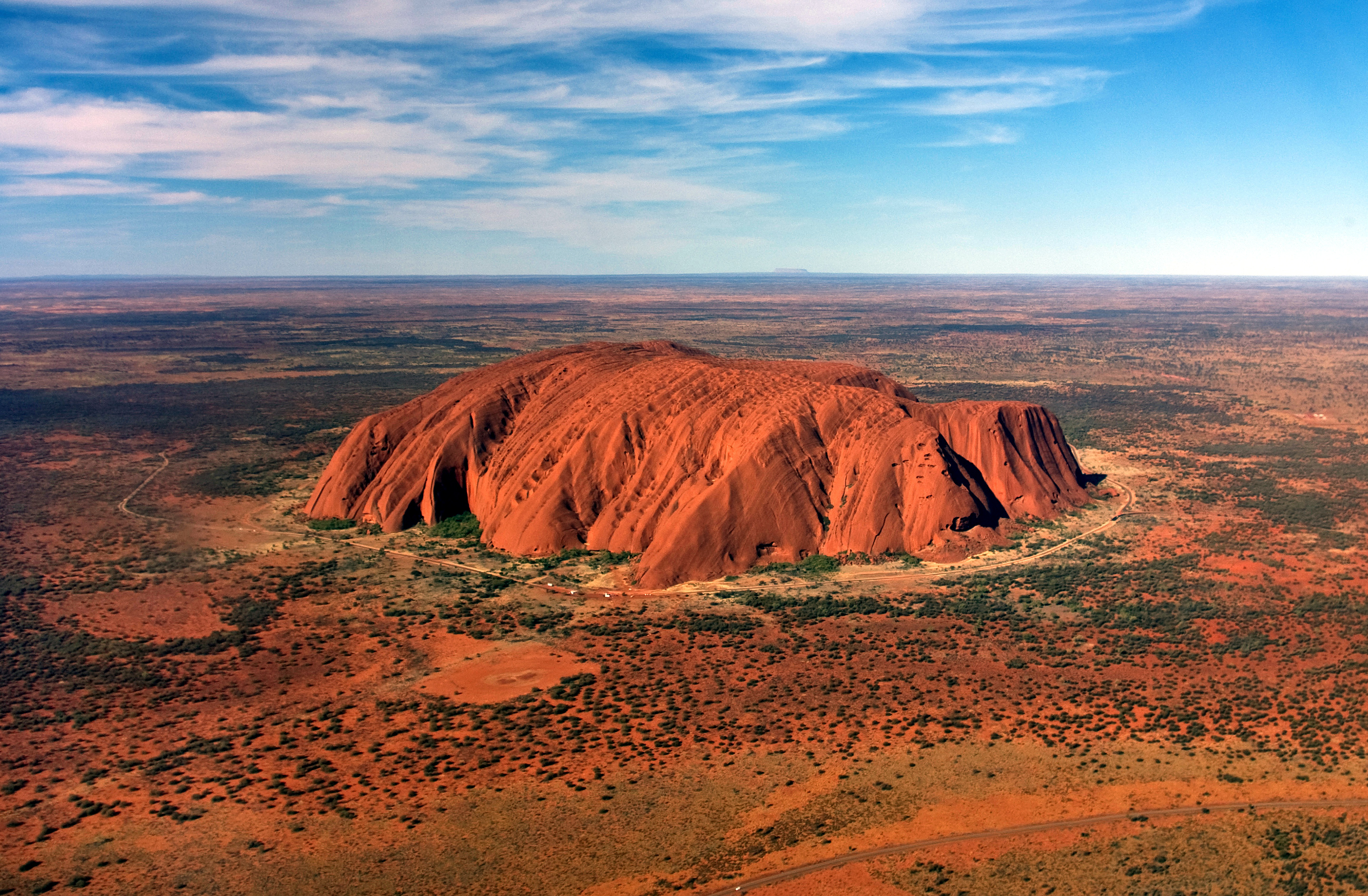
Uluru, Northern Territory, Australia, is often referred to as the biggest monolith. While the surrounding rocks were eroded, the rock survived as sandstone strata making up the surviving Uluru 'monolith'.

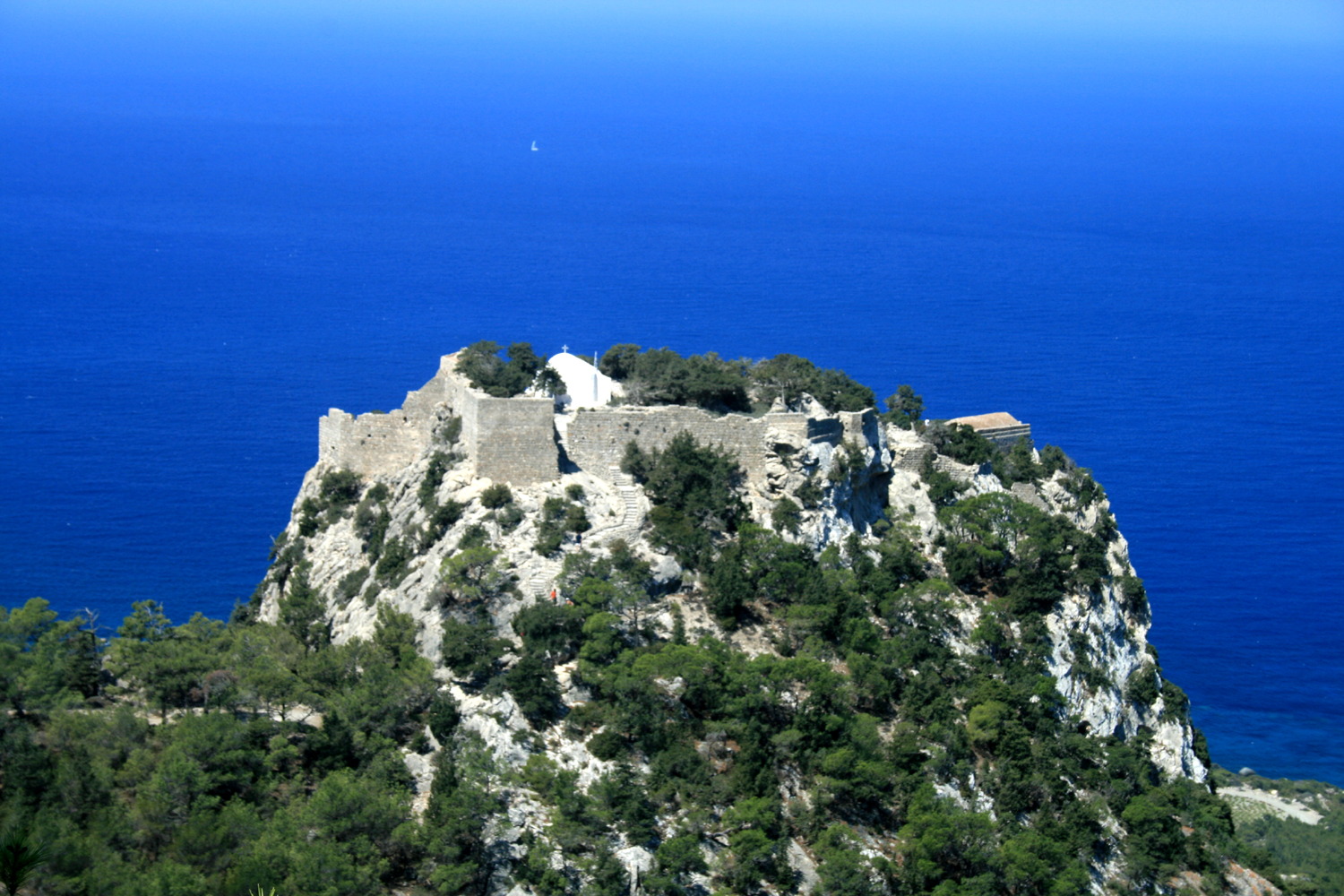
Monolithos fortress on Rhodes, Greece

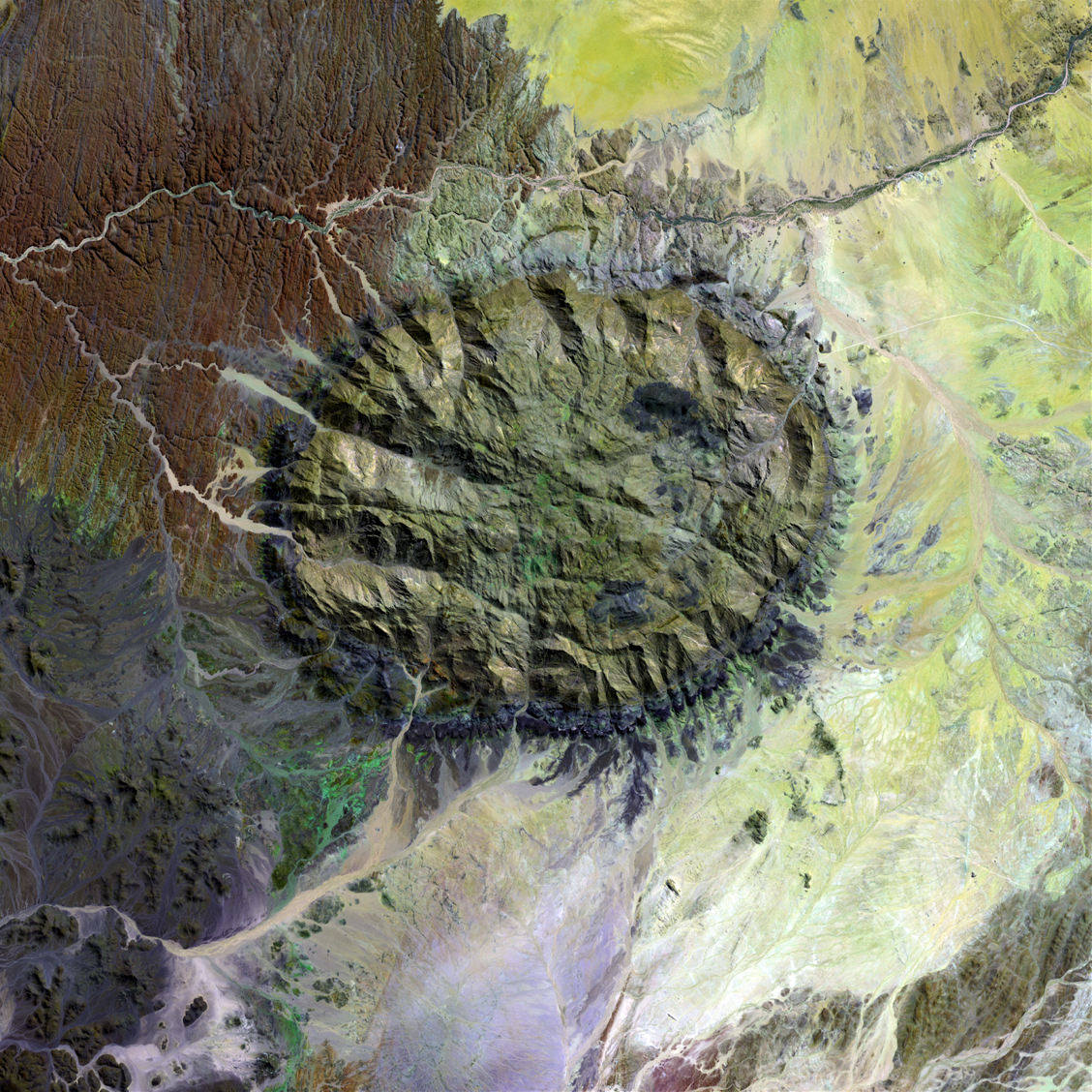
Landsat 7 image Brandberg Mountain, Namibia

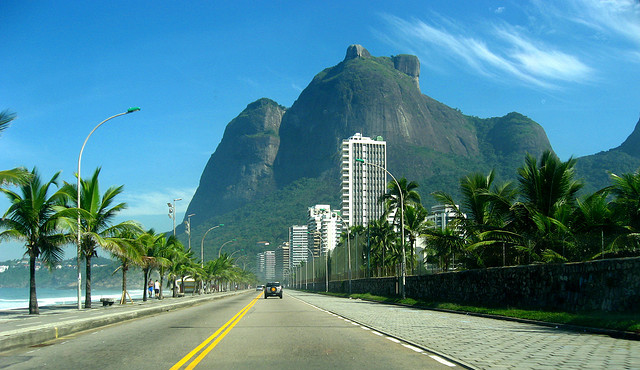
Gavea Rock, a monolith next to the sea, near Rio de Janeiro, Brazil

A monolith is a geological feature consisting of a single massive stone or rock, such as some mountains. Erosion usually exposes the geological formations, which are often made of very hard and solid igneous or metamorphic rock. Some monoliths are volcanic plugs, solidified lava filling the vent of an extinct volcano.

In architecture, the term has considerable overlap with megalith, which is normally used for prehistory, and may be used in the contexts of rock-cut architecture that remains attached to solid rock, as in monolithic church, or for exceptionally large stones such as obelisks, statues, monolithic columns or large architraves, that may have been moved a considerable distance after quarrying. It may also be used of large glacial erratics moved by natural forces.

The word derives, via the Latin monolithus, from the Ancient Greek word μονόλιθος (monólithos), from μόνος (mónos) meaning "one" or "single" and λίθος (líthos) meaning "stone".

== Geological monoliths ==
Large, well-known monoliths include:

=== Africa ===
- Aso Rock, Nigeria
- Ben Amera, Mauritania
- Brandberg Mountain, Namibia
- Sibebe, Eswatini
- Zuma Rock, Nigeria
- Mount Lubiri, Angola
- Mount Poi, Kenya
- Great Sphinx of Giza
- Oruku Rock, Ososo, Edo State, Nigeria

=== Antarctica ===
- Scullin monolith

=== Asia ===
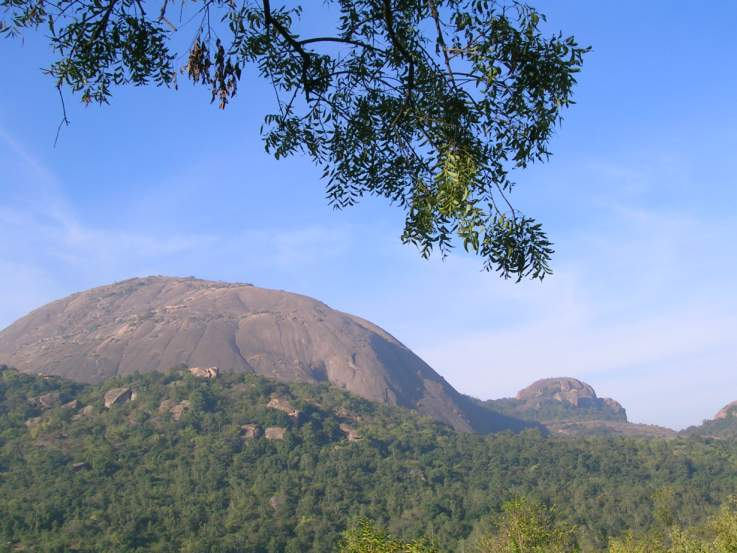
Savandurga, India, from the northern side

Sangla Hill, Pakistan

- Batu Caves, Selangor, Malaysia
- Ahmedabad, Gujarat, India
- Gilbert Hill, Mumbai, Maharashtra, India
- Kailasa temple, Ellora, Maharashtra, India
- Namakkal Fort, Namakkal, Tamil Nadu, India
- Malaikottai, Trichy, Tamil Nadu, India
- St. Thomas Mount, Chennai, Tamil Nadu, India
- Bellary Fort, Bellary, India
- Madhugiri Betta, Karnataka, India
- Yana, Karnataka, India
- Bhongir, Telangana, India
- Ekasila, Warangal, India
- Mount Kelam, Indonesia
- Mount Pico de Loro, Philippines
- Mount Pulumbato, Philippines
- Sangla Hill, Pakistan
- Savandurga, Karnataka, India
- Sigiriya, Sri Lanka

=== Australia ===
- Bald Rock, near Tenterfield, New South Wales
- Mount Augustus (Burringurrah), Western Australia (NOTE: this is not actually monolith as popularly claimed, but, rather, a monocline)
- Mount Coolum, Queensland
- Mount Wudinna, South Australia
- Pine Mountain, Victoria
- Uluru, Northern Territory

=== Europe ===
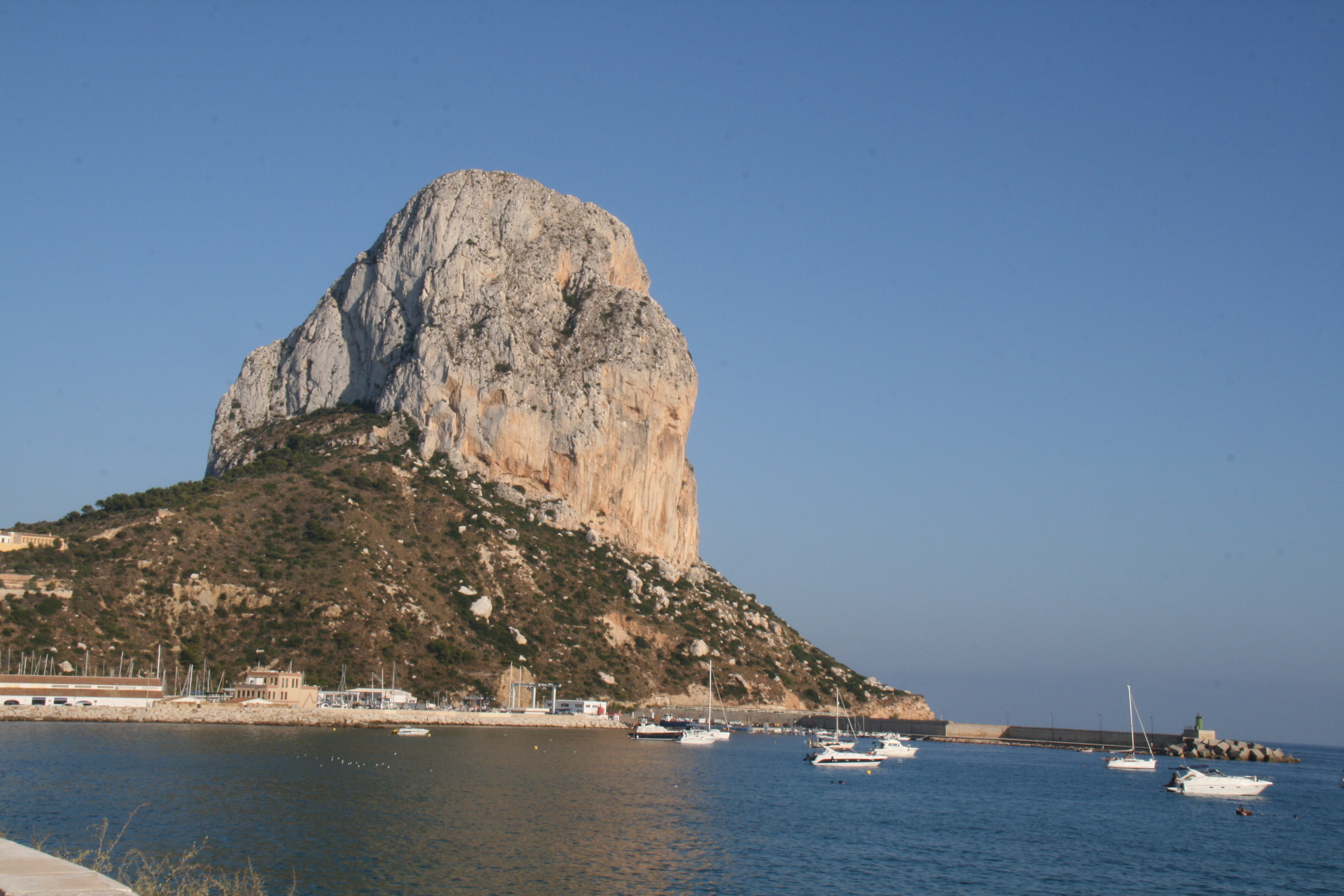
Penyal d'Ifac, Spain

- Kalamos, Anafi, Greece
- Katskhi Pillar, Georgia
- Levski G., Sofia, Bulgaria
- Logan Rock, Treen, Cornwall, United Kingdom
- Monolithe de Sardières, Sollières-Sardières, France
- Penyal d'Ifac, Calpe, Valencian Community, Spain
- Peña de Arcos, Arcos de la Frontera, Andalusia, Spain
- Peña de los Enamorados, Antequera, Andalusia, Spain (a World Heritage Site)
- Rauk, Sweden
- Rock of Gibraltar, Gibraltar
- Rock of Monaco, Monaco-Ville, Monaco
- Pietra Cappa, San Luca, Italy

=== North America ===
==== United States ====
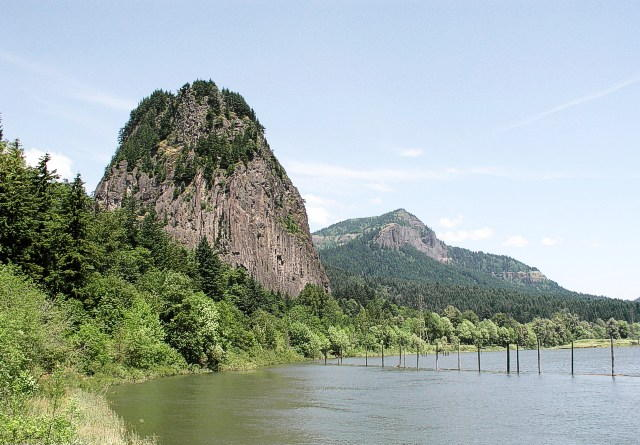
Beacon Rock, Washington, viewed from the west

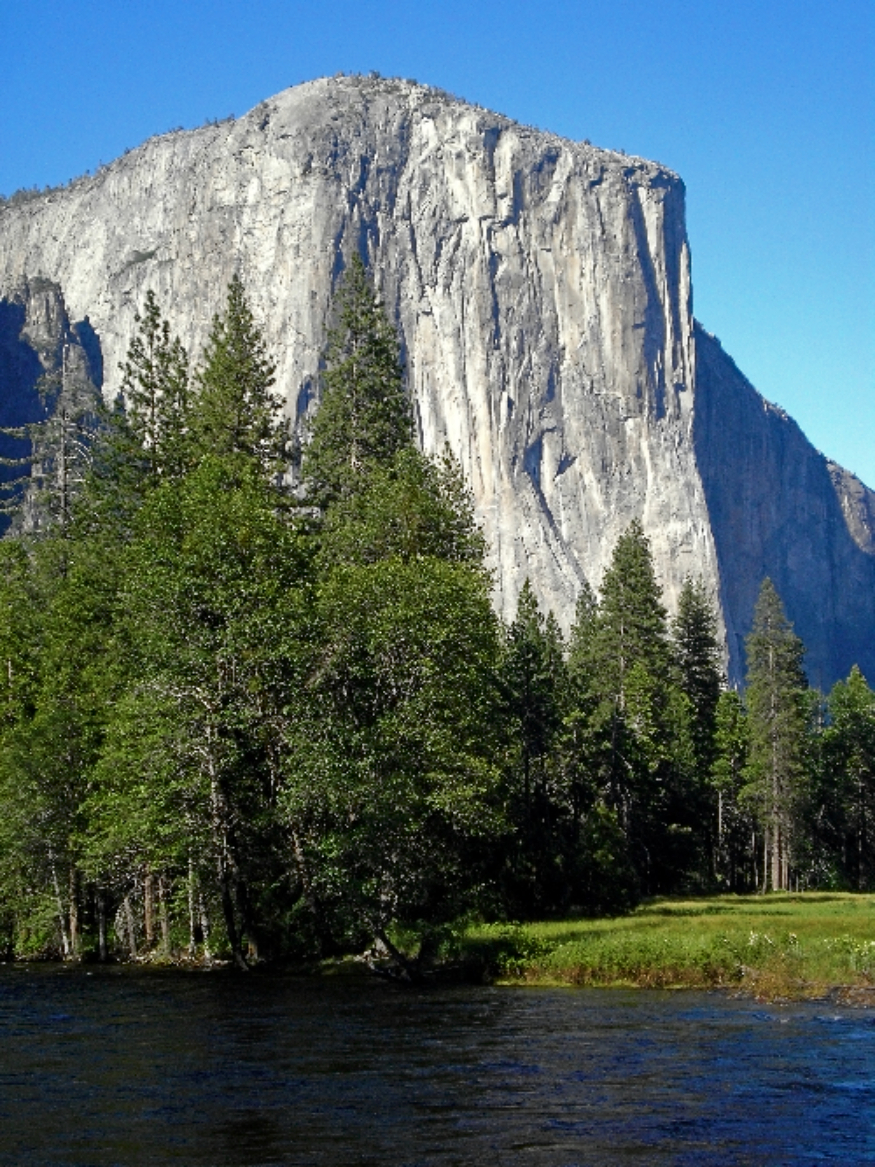
El Capitan in Yosemite

- Angels Landing, Zion National Park, Utah
- Beacon Rock, Columbia River Gorge, Washington
- Bottleneck Peak, Sids Mountain, Utah
- Castle Rock, Pineville, West Virginia
- Chimney Rock, Bayard, Nebraska
- Chimney Rock, Chimney Rock, North Carolina
- Courthouse and Jail Rocks, Bridgeport, Nebraska
- Devils Tower, Wyoming
- El Capitan, Yosemite National Park, California
- Enchanted Rock, Llano County, Texas
- Frog Woman Rock, Mendocino County, California
- Great White Throne, Zion National Park, Utah
- Half Dome, Yosemite National Park, California
- Haystack Rock, Clatsop County, Oregon
- Looking Glass Rock, Transylvania County, North Carolina
- Moro Rock, Sequoia National Park, California
- Quincy Quarries Reservation, Quincy, Massachusetts
- Scotts Bluff National Monument, Gering, Nebraska
- Shiprock, San Juan County, New Mexico
- Stone Mountain, Stone Mountain, Georgia
- Stone Mountain, Stone Mountain, North Carolina
- Tooth of Time, Cimarron, New Mexico
- Wolf Rock, Linn County, Oregon

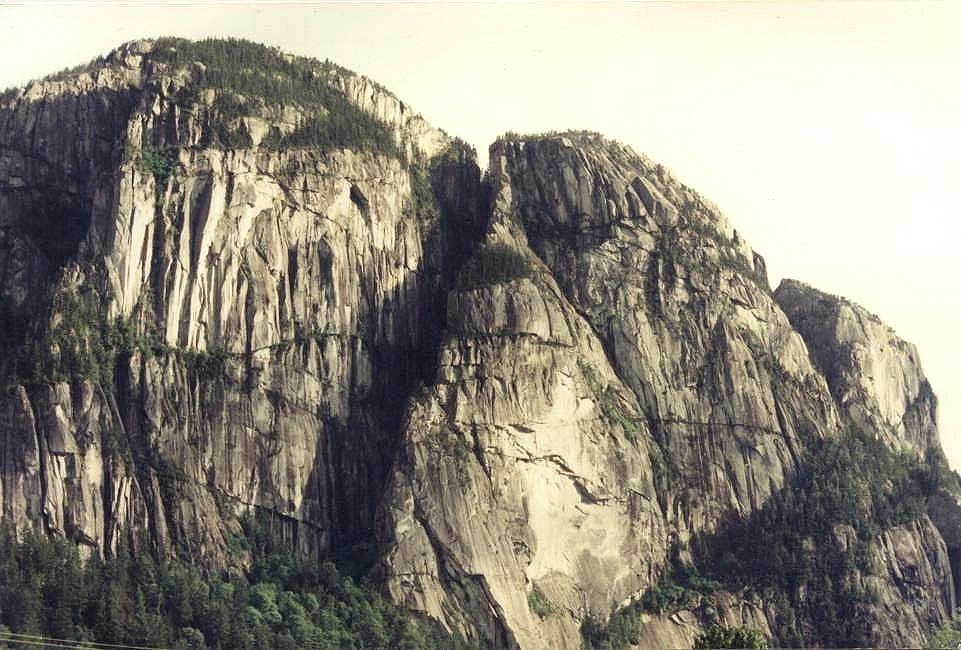
Stawamus Chief as seen from Valleycliffe neighborhood in Squamish, British Columbia

==== Canada ====
- Stawamus Chief, Squamish, British Columbia
- Mingan Archipelago National Park Reserve, Quebec' ' '

==== Mexico ====
- La Peña de Bernal, Queretaro; claimed to be the world's third-largest monolith
- Las Piedrotas, near the town of Tapalpa, Jalisco.

=== South America ===
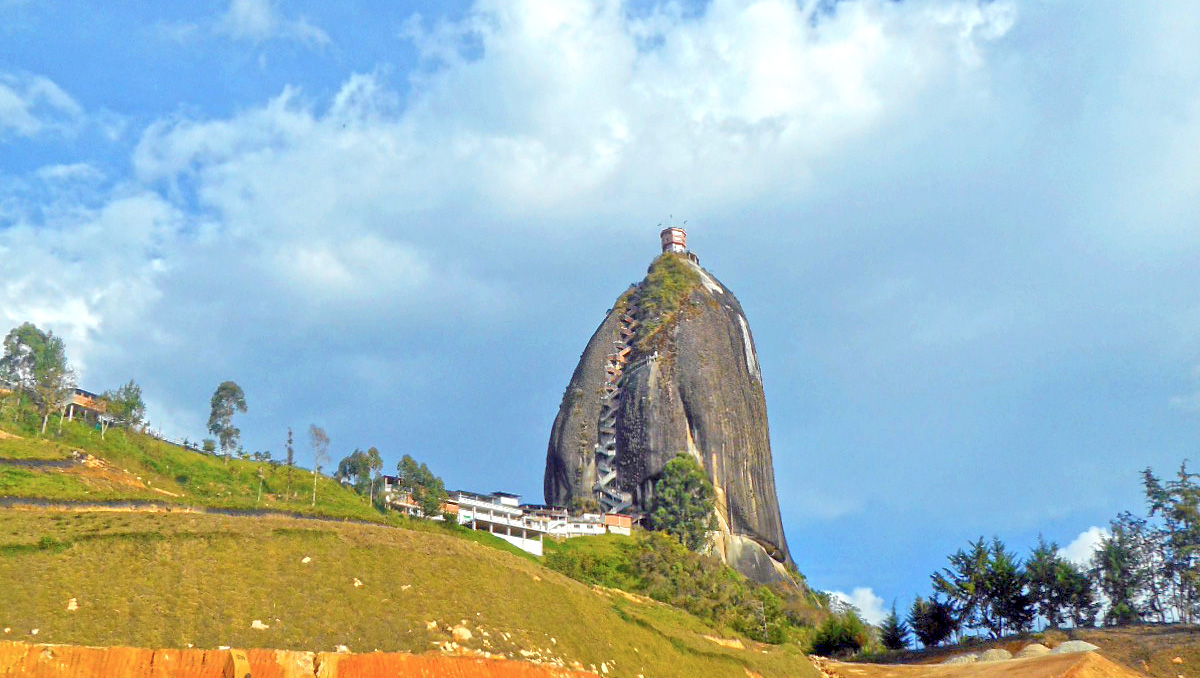
El Peñón, monolith in Colombia, located in Antioquia

- Cochamó Valley, Several granitic monoliths, Chile
- El Peñón, also known as El Peñol Stone or simply La Piedra, Colombia
- Pão de Açúcar, Brazil
- Pedra da Gávea, Brazil the world's largest monolith on the coastline
- Pedra da Galinha Choca, Brazil
- Torres del Paine, Chile

=== Outside Earth ===
- Phobos monolith on Phobos
- Mars monolith

== Monumental monoliths ==
A structure which has been excavated as a unit from a surrounding matrix or outcropping of rock.

- Aztec calendar stone – "Stone of the Sun"
- The Church of Saint George in Lalibela, Ethiopia – one of a number of monolithic churches in Ethiopia.
- The vast monoliths which went into the walls of Osaka Castle, Japan.
- Coyolxauhqui Stone – an Aztec monolith
- Ellora Caves – UNESCO World Heritage Site
- Great Sphinx of Giza – "The Egyptian Sphinx"
- Gommateshwara statue of Bahubali at Sravanabelagola, Carnataca, India
- Obelisks – both ancient obelisks and modern obelisks
- Ogham stones – inscribed standing stones throughout Ireland
- Vishapakar – ancient dragon stones in the Armenian highlands
- Runestones
- Standing stones
- Stelae
- Stone circle
- Stone of the Pregnant Woman, Baalbek
- Stonehenge in present-day England
- The Longstones (or "the Devil's Quoits") in Avebury, Wiltshire, England
- Architecture of Vijayanagar in present-day south India

== See also ==
- List of individual rocks
- Granite dome – Rounded hills of bare granite formed by exfoliation
- Bornhardt – Large, dome-shaped, steep-sided, bald rock
- Inselberg – Isolated, steep rock hill on relatively flat terrain
- Butte – Isolated hill with steep, often vertical sides and a small, relatively flat top
- Kigilyakh – Natural tall rock pillars in Yakutia
- Megalith – Large stone used to build a structure or monument
- Menhir – Large upright stone placed by humans
- Monadnock – Isolated, steep rock hill on relatively flat terrain (or inselberg)
- Monolith (Space Odyssey) – Fictional artefacts from Arthur C. Clarke's Space Odyssey novels
- Monolithic architecture – Buildings carved or excavated from a single material, usually rock
- Monolithos (Rhodes)
- Utah Monolith – Metal pillar in Utah, US
