= Ezulwini Handicrafts Centre =

Handicrafts centre for regional significance

Coordinates: 26.415°S 31.181°E

Ezulwini Handicrafts Centre is a handicrafts centre of notable regional significance located in the Ezulwini Valley in northwestern Eswatini, off the MR3 road. The centre was opened following investment by Taiwanese entrepreneurs and features many locally made sculptures, jewelry, textiles and other crafts.
