= Ezulwini Valley =

Valley in Eswatini

Coordinates: 26°28′45″S 31°14′25″E

Ezulwini Valley is a valley of northwest Eswatini. Also known as "The Valley of Heaven", the valley lasts for about 30 kilometres, and is bounded to the east by the Mdzimba hills. The historical capital of Eswatini Lobamba is located in the valley, also known as the Royal Valley, a place of many legends of Swazi history. The main highway is the MR3 road; some parts have four lanes. The valley extends as far down as Kwaluseni. The valley contains a number of notable wildlife sanctuaries and features including the 4,500-hectare Mlilwane Wildlife Sanctuary (established in 1964) and the Royal Swazi Sun Hotel. The valley is undergoing significant development with the growth of Tourism in Eswatini, with the building of casinos, bars, hotels, shops such as the Gables Shopping Centre and urbanization. Also of note is the Ezulwini Handicrafts Centre and Swazi National Museum in Lobamba. Despite the urban developments in the valley, the landscape still has some "soft green hills and plains-game grazing in the lush lands below."
