= Eswatini Beverages Ltd =

Beverage and brewing company in Matsapha, Eswatini

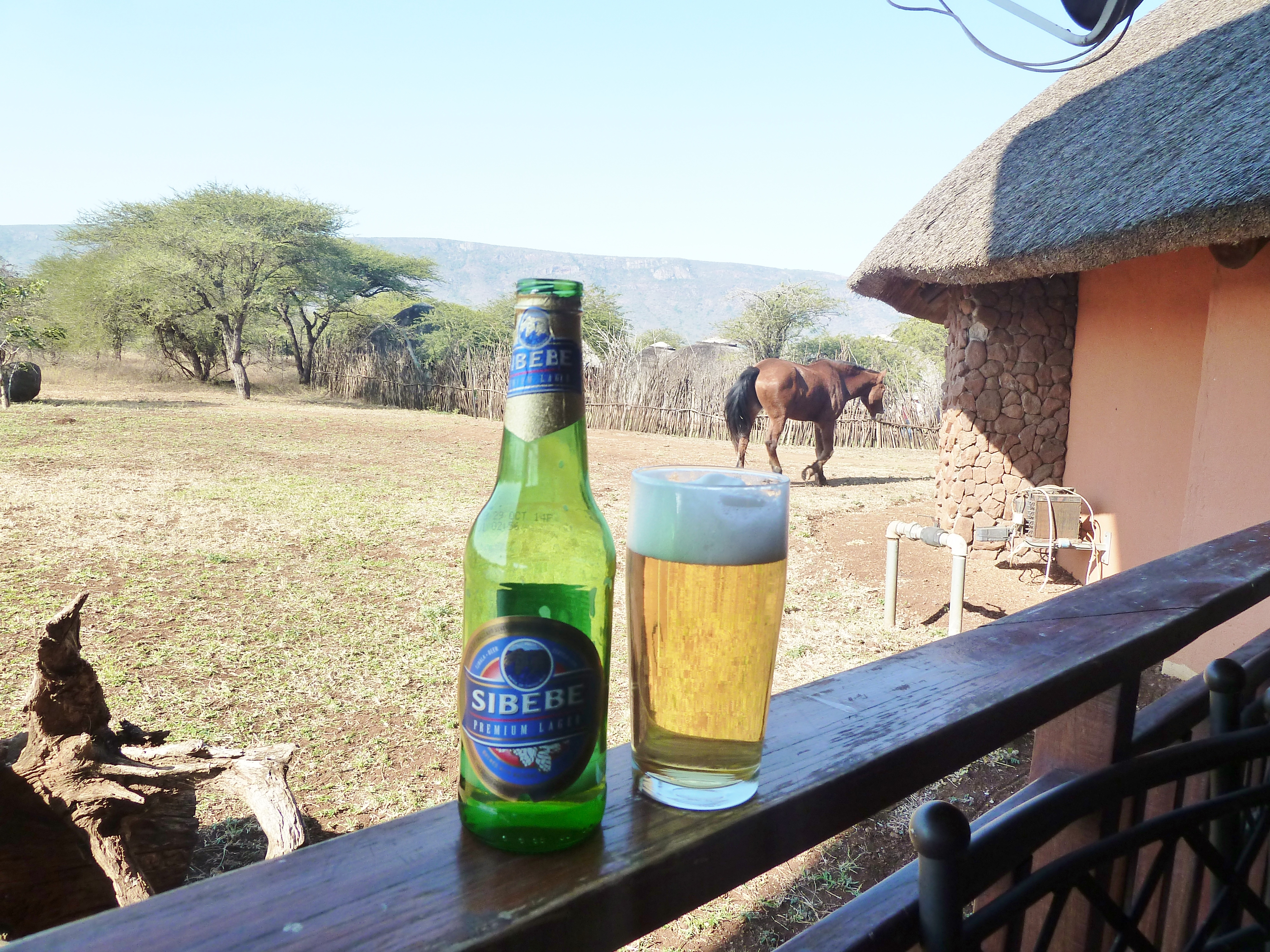
Sibebe Premium Lager

Eswatini Beverages Ltd (EBL) is a AB InBev subsidiary. It was a subsidiary of SABMiller until 10 October 2016 when it was acquired by Anheuser-Busch InBev. It is a beverage and brewing company in Matsapha, Eswatini. The company was formed in 1995 by the merger of Eswatini Breweries, Ngwane Breweries, and Eswatini Bottlers. EBL produces and markets soft drinks, beer, and other alcoholic drinks.

The Swazi beer produced is Sibebe Premium Lager named after the Sibebe rock, but other beers are brewed as well including Castle Lager. EBL dominates the beer market in Eswatini with a market share of 87%; in 2014 227 hl of lager beer were sold.

Retooling in 2013 led to a temporary beer shortage in Eswatini.

== Tax compliance ==
In July 2026, Eswatini Beverages was named the Overall Highest Compliant Contributor at the Eswatini Revenue Service (ERS) Client Appreciation Awards, recognising it as the top compliant taxpayer among businesses assessed for tax and customs compliance. The company also won the Large Manufacturing, Mining, Quarrying and Other Industrial Activities category at the same event, and was among 15 companies accredited as Authorised Economic Operators by ERS that year.
