= List of countries by social welfare spending =

This is a list of countries by spending on social welfare. Countries with the highest levels of spending are more likely to be considered welfare states. These tables are lists of social welfare spending as a percentage of GDP compiled by Organisation for Economic Co-operation and Development ("OECD") into the OECD Social Expenditure Database which "includes reliable and internationally comparable statistics on public and mandatory and voluntary private social expenditure at programme level." Total net social spending in terms of percent of GDP, takes into account public and private social expenditure, and also includes the effect of direct taxes (income tax and social security contributions), indirect taxation of consumption on cash benefits, as well as tax breaks for social purposes.

== List ==
Social welfare spending (2021–24)
Country	% of GDP		Per capita ($)	
Country	Public	Net total	Constant	Current
Australia	17.1	22.9	8,659	12,246
Austria	31.6	29.4	16,364	20,349
Belgium	28.6	26.7	14,138	18,007
Bulgaria	20.5	—	4,622	6,054
Canada	19.3	—	8,967	11,974
Chile	12.9	20.9	3,019	4,217
Colombia	14.1	17.4	2,091	3,093
Costa Rica	12.6	13.0	2,548	3,291
Croatia	22.5	—	6,690	8,298
Czech Republic	22.1	20.8	8,607	11,108
Denmark	26.4	24.4	15,478	19,768
Estonia	17.2	16.1	6,819	8,585
Finland	31.4	25.6	14,110	17,788
France	30.6	32.0	13,588	18,147
Germany	27.9	28.5	14,678	18,172
Greece	23.7	22.5	7,455	8,795
Hungary	18.0	16.5	6,117	7,216
Iceland	19.2	24.5	11,842	14,504
Ireland	14.4	13.7	14,059	15,837
Israel	16.3	18.6	6,912	8,764
Italy	27.6	26.5	11,746	15,056
Japan	24.7	26.9	10,497	11,856
Latvia	19.7	19.1	6,327	7,739
Lithuania	16.9	17.7	7,244	8,964
Luxembourg	24.0	17.7	24,288	29,667
Mexico	10.0	9.4	1,964	2,559
Netherlands	18.9	27.0	10,942	13,694
New Zealand	24.6	22.2	10,258	12,792
Norway	24.1	20.6	14,758	20,839
Peru	7.5	—	928	1,285
Poland	23.1	18.4	7,747	9,258
Portugal	24.1	24.7	8,117	9,867
Romania	17.6	—	4,911	6,686
Slovakia	19.3	18.4	6,555	7,301
Slovenia	23.0	22.5	9,159	11,353
South Korea	15.3	—	7,668	9,009
Spain	25.9	26.6	10,310	12,547
Sweden	26.1	23.9	13,655	16,615
Switzerland	16.0	26.1	12,055	14,281
Turkey	10.4	11.1	3,474	3,492
United Kingdom	23.0	26.0	10,247	13,184
United States	19.8	33.2	12,284	15,293
OECD	21.2	22.6	9,969	12,198

== See also ==
- List of countries by tax rates
- List of countries by tax revenue to GDP ratio
- Welfare state
