= Intra-European Organisation of Tax Administrations =

Tax organization in Europe

Logo

The Intra-European Organisation of Tax Administrations (IOTA) is a non-profit intergovernmental organisation, which provides a forum to assist members in European countries to improve their fiscal functionality. The IOTA headquarters are located in Budapest.

== History ==
Members include organizations and ministries who assist tax subjects (citizens) for the various governments across Europe. The body was organised as a result of the Conference of Tax Administrations of Central and Eastern Europe and Baltic Countries (CEEB), held between 28 and 30 October 1996, in Warsaw. The formation was supported by the European Union, the International Monetary Fund, the OECD, CIAT and the United States.

== Membership ==
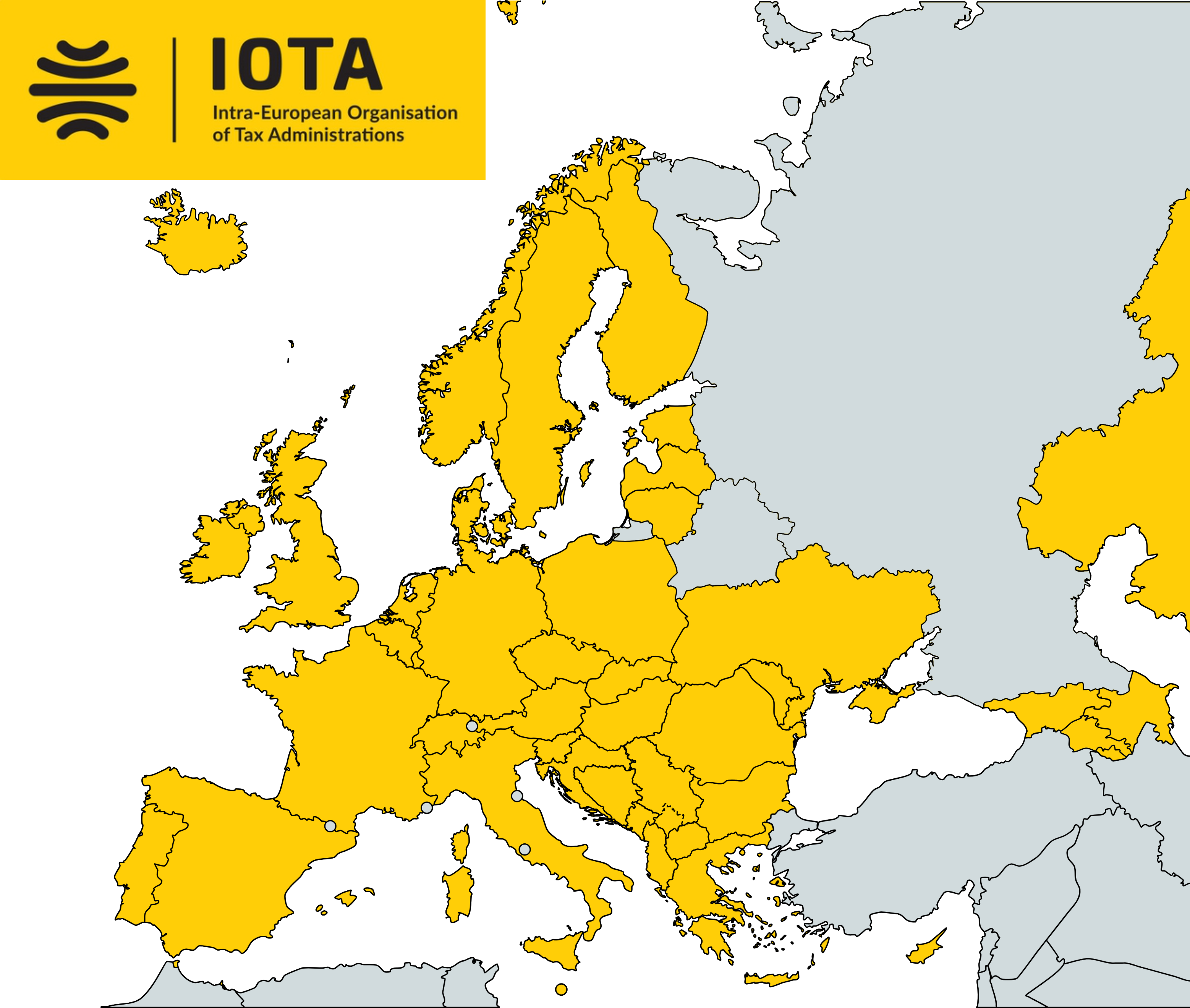

The following states are full members of the Intra-European Organisation of Tax Administrations:

- Albania
- Armenia
- Austria
- Azerbaijan
- Belgium
- Bosnia and Herzegovina
- Bulgaria
- Croatia
- Cyprus
- Czech Republic
- Denmark
- Estonia
- Finland
- France
- Georgia
- Germany
- Greece
- Hungary
- Ireland
- Italy
- Kazakhstan
- Latvia
- Lithuania
- Luxembourg
- Malta
- Moldova
- Montenegro
- Netherlands
- North Macedonia
- Norway
- Poland
- Portugal
- Romania
- Serbia
- Slovakia
- Slovenia
- Spain
- Sweden
- Switzerland
- Ukraine
- United Kingdom

Associated members include:

- South Korea
- Uzbekistan

== See also ==
- Economy of Europe
- Inter-American Center of Tax Administrations
- List of countries by tax rates
- List of countries by tax revenue to GDP ratio
- Network of Tax Organizations
