= Phobos monolith =

Rock on Phobos

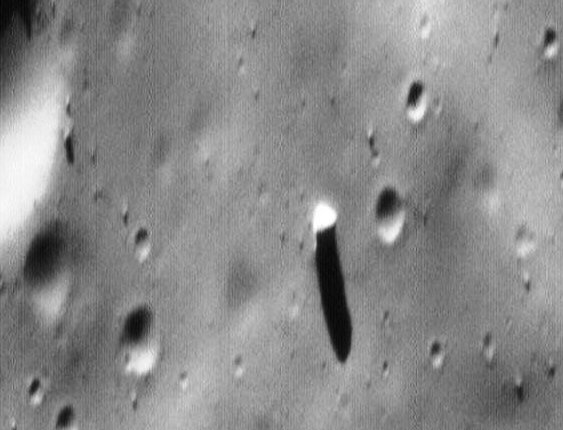
The Phobos monolith (right of center, casting long shadow) as taken by the Mars Global Surveyor (MOC Image 55103, 1998).

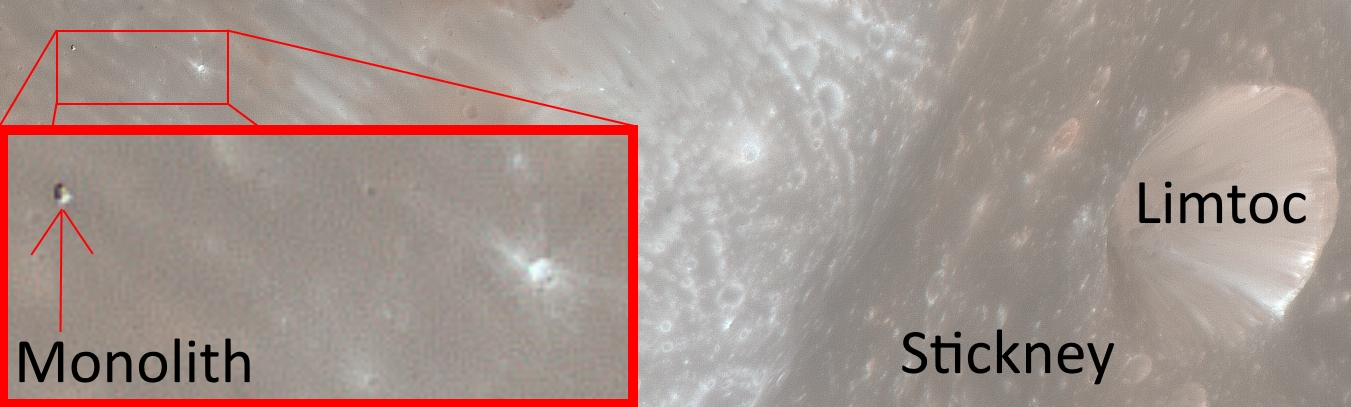
The location of the monolith (HiRISE image PIA10368)

The Phobos monolith is a large rock on the surface of Mars's moon Phobos. It is a boulder, about 85 m (279 ft) across and 90 m (300 ft) tall. A monolith is a geological feature consisting of a single massive piece of rock. Monoliths also occur naturally on Earth, but it has been suggested that the Phobos monolith may be a piece of impact ejecta. The monolith is a bright object near Stickney crater, described as a "building sized" boulder, which casts a prominent shadow. It was discovered by Efrain Palermo, who did extensive surveys of Martian probe imagery, and later confirmed by Lan Fleming, an imaging sub-contractor at NASA Johnson Space Center.

The general vicinity of the monolith is a proposed landing site by Optech and the Mars Institute, for a robotic mission to Phobos known as PRIME (Phobos Reconnaissance and International Mars Exploration). The PRIME mission would be composed of an orbiter and lander, and each would carry four instruments designed to study various aspects of Phobos's geology. At present, PRIME has not been funded and does not have a projected launch date. Former astronaut Buzz Aldrin has spoken about the Phobos monolith and his support for a mission to Phobos.

The object appears in Mars Global Surveyor images SP2-52603 and SP2-55103, dated 1998. The object is unrelated to another monolith located on the surface of Mars, which NASA noted as an example of a common surface feature in that region.

== In fiction ==
The Phobos monolith is featured in the Alastair Reynolds science-fiction novel Blue Remembered Earth (2012), wherein its surface has been entirely carved by visiting astronauts into the semblance of a wrecked spaceship.

The debut studio album by The Claypool Lennon Delirium, consisting of American multi-instrumentalists Sean Lennon and Primus vocalist and bassist Les Claypool, which was released on June 3, 2016, is called Monolith of Phobos.

== See also ==
- Caves of Mars Project
- Cydonia (Mars)
- Libya Montes
- Mars Global Surveyor
- Mars monolith
- Monolith (Space Odyssey)
