= Mars monolith =

Rectangular boulder discovered on the surface of Mars

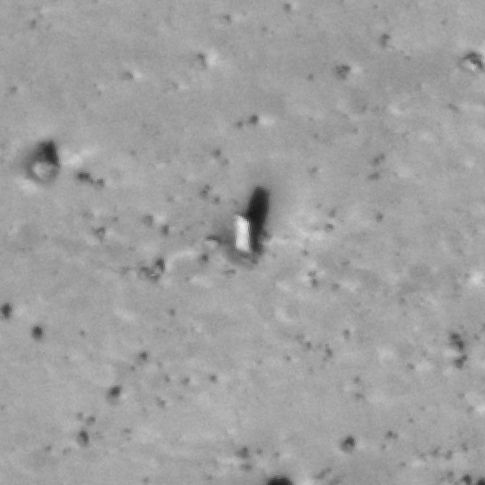
The Mars monolith as seen from orbit

The Mars monolith is a rectangular object, probably a boulder, discovered on the surface of Mars. The Mars Reconnaissance Orbiter took pictures of it from orbit, roughly 180 miles (300 km) away. The HiRISE camera that was used to photograph the monolith has a resolution of approximately 1 foot or 30 centimeters per pixel.

Around the same time, the Phobos monolith made international news.

== See also ==
- List of rocks on Mars
- Mineralogy of Mars
- Phobos monolith, boulder on Martian moon
