= Economy of the Americas =

Statistics
- Population: 1.056 billion (13.6% of the world)
- GDP: $33.981 trillion
- GDP growth: Per capita: 3%
- GDP per capita: Currency: US$23,989
- Millionaires (US$): 3.75 million
- Unemployment: 10%
- Through merging of North America and South America information All values, unless otherwise stated, are in US dollars.

The economy of the Americas comprises more than 1 billion people in 35 countries and 18 territories. Sometimes divided into the continents of North America and South America depending on the source, like other continents, the wealth between the states in the Americas varies considerably, with significant wealth inequality within nations. The difference in wealth across the Americas can be seen roughly between the economies of North America and South America, with the countries in the former (most notably the United States) significantly better off than those in the latter.

== Economic Integration ==
=== Asia-Pacific Economic Cooperation ===
The Asia-Pacific Economic Cooperation (APEC) is a group of Pacific Rim countries which meet with the purpose of improving economic and political ties. APEC's stated goals are aimed at free and open trade and investments by cutting tariffs between zero and five percent in the Asia-Pacific area for industrialised economies by 2010 and for developing economies by 2020.

The organisation has members from four continents, those from North America are Canada, Mexico and the United States.

=== Caribbean Community ===
The Caribbean Community (CARICOM) was created "To provide dynamic leadership and service, in partnership with Community institutions and Groups, toward the attainment of a viable, internationally competitive and sustainable Community, with improved quality of life for all".

- On January 1, 2006 six members: (Barbados, Belize, Guyana, Jamaica, Suriname and Trinidad and Tobago) unofficially ushered in the Caribbean (CARICOM) Single Market and Economy (CSME).

- At the official signing of the protocol on January 30, 2006 in Jamaica, A further six members: (Antigua and Barbuda, Dominica, Grenada, Saint Kitts and Nevis, Saint Lucia and Saint Vincent and the Grenadines) announced their intention to join by the second quarter of 2006. Montserrat, a British Oversees territory is awaiting approval by the United Kingdom. Haiti and the Bahamas have no immediate plans to join.

=== Central American Free Trade Agreement ===
The Central American Free Trade Agreement (CAFTA) is an agreement between the United States and the Central American countries of Costa Rica, Guatemala, El Salvador, Honduras, and Nicaragua. The treaty is aimed at promoting free trade between its members. Canada and Mexico are negotiating membership.

=== United States Mexico Canada Agreement ===
The United States Mexico Canada Agreement (USMCA) is an agreement between Canada, Mexico and the United States to eliminate tariffs on goods traded between themselves as well as environmental and worker protections.

Although currently only a trade agreement, with no supranational bodies or laws as in the European Union, there have been various proposals to move towards a customs union or a North American currency union. It is unknown whether or not this may eventually develop into a North American Union similar to that of Europe.

== Global trade relations ==
The majority of the trade in the Americas is done, throughout the Americas, and also with Europe and Asia.
