= Tourism in Eswatini =

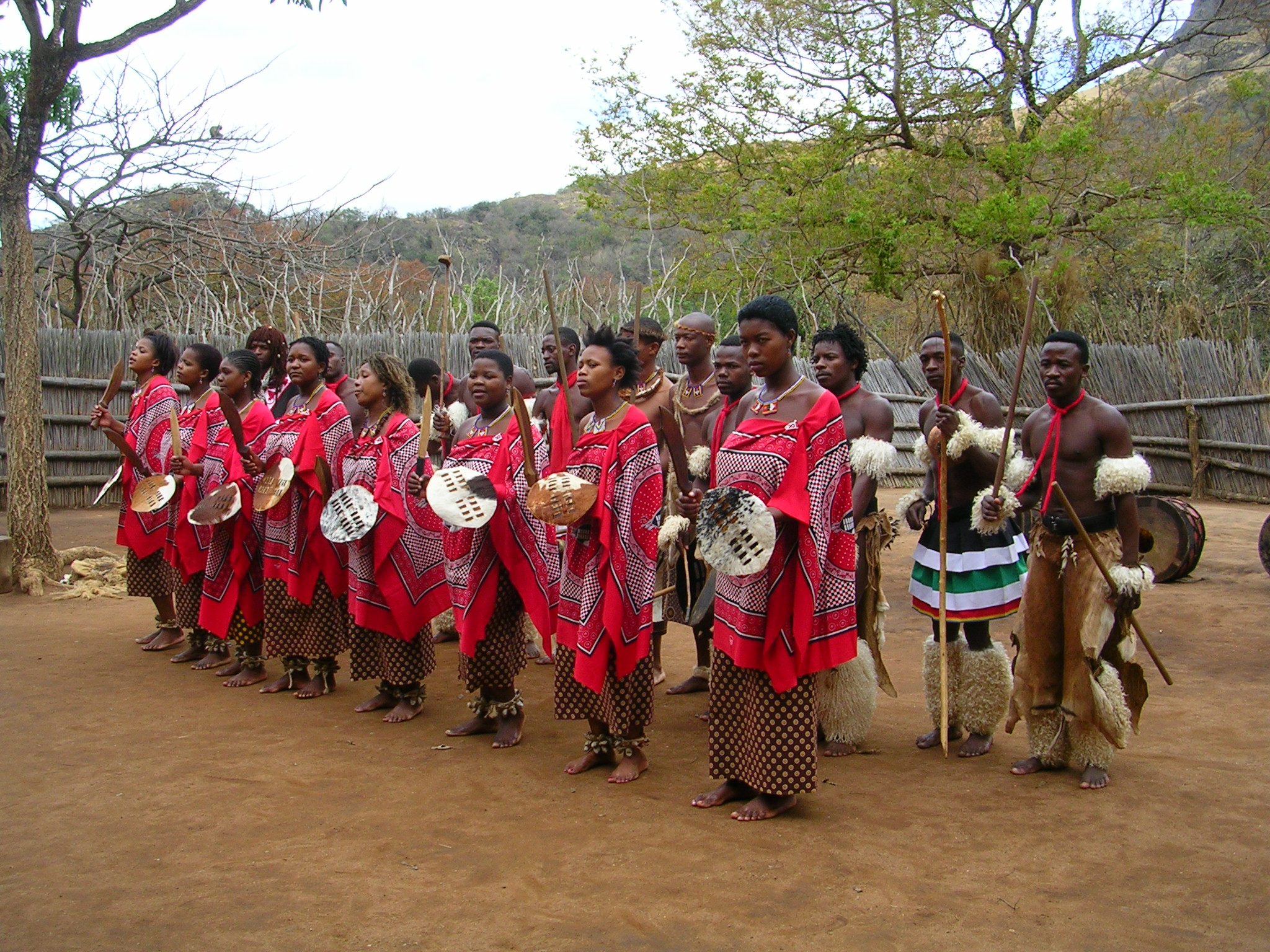
Swazis dancing in a cultural village show

Tourism in Eswatini developed during the apartheid era in South Africa and this shaped many of its distinctive attractions. Since the end of apartheid, Eswatini has emphasized its traditional culture as a tourist attraction. Most of the tourists who visit Eswatini arrive by road from South Africa.

== Apartheid era ==
The adoption of apartheid in South Africa and civil war in Mozambique contributed to Eswatini's appeal as an alternative tourist destination in Southern Africa. This led to growth in Eswatini's tourism industry from the 1960s to the 1990s. During the apartheid era in South Africa, Eswatini drew many visitors by adopting different policies than South Africa. Many tourists visited Eswatini during that time to watch television programs or sporting events that they could not view in South Africa. During apartheid in South Africa, Eswatini also legalized gambling to draw tourists what brought significant economic prosperity.

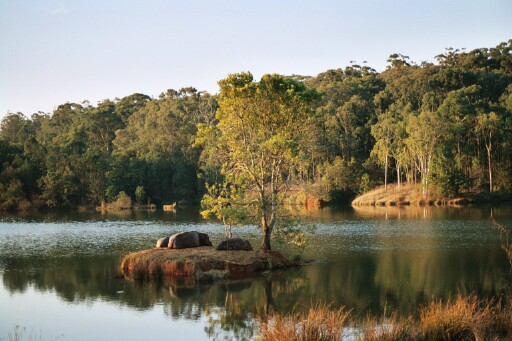
Lake with hippos in the Mlilwane reserve

The number of tourists visiting Eswatini increased from 89,015 in 1972 to 257,997 in 1989. In 1988 tourism was 3% of the GDP of Eswatini and more than 4% of its total exports. Although the traditional Monarchy of Eswatini has often been cited as a factor that attracts tourists, tourism has also been credited with causing modernization in Eswatini. Although the increases in tourism seen in Eswatini have been alleged to have caused an increase in prostitution, there is no evidence that prostitution was a factor in the growth of the Eswatini tourism industry. The increase in tourism did cause the centers of prostitution in Eswatini to shift from mining areas to hotels.

== Post-apartheid ==
After the end of apartheid in South Africa and conclusion of the Mozambican Civil War made its neighbors more appealing tourism destinations, the growth of the tourism industry in Eswatini decreased. Many of the tourists who visit Eswatini are traveling between Mozambique and South Africa. Most tourists only stay for one night and many visitors only take day trips to the country.

Due to the lack of other major industries, tourism is viewed by many in Eswatini as a potential source for future economic growth. Since its establishment in 2003, the Eswatini Tourism Board has emphasized the fact that Eswatini is the last sub-Saharan African monarchy. Royal celebrations such as the Incwala Kingship festival are viewed as potential venues for greater tourism growth. They have also attempted to attract tourists to the game parks of Swaziland. In 2006 Eswatini signed on to the Lubombo Route agreement along with South Africa and Mozambique. The agreement allowed tourists to travel across the three countries with a single visa.

== Arrivals by country ==
Most visitors arriving to Eswatini were from the following countries of nationality:

Country	2016	2015	2014
South Africa	814,220	810,249	856,492
Mozambique	202,042	181,271	219,555
Zimbabwe	49,295	69,467	58,624
Germany	22,895	21,510	21,669
France	21,253	19,360	14,152
Netherlands	20,750	17,414	17,874
United States	18,014	17,988	17,359
United Kingdom	15,503	14,646	15,813
Pakistan	7,450	5,216	4,242
India	6,867	5,145	5,031
Portugal	6,610	6,047	6,720
Botswana	5,969	5,833	5,913
Lesotho	5,682	5,092	5,554
Tanzania	5,659	6,311	5,718
Total	1,278,587	1,255,901	1,324,621
