= International Centre for Tax and Development =

English research centre

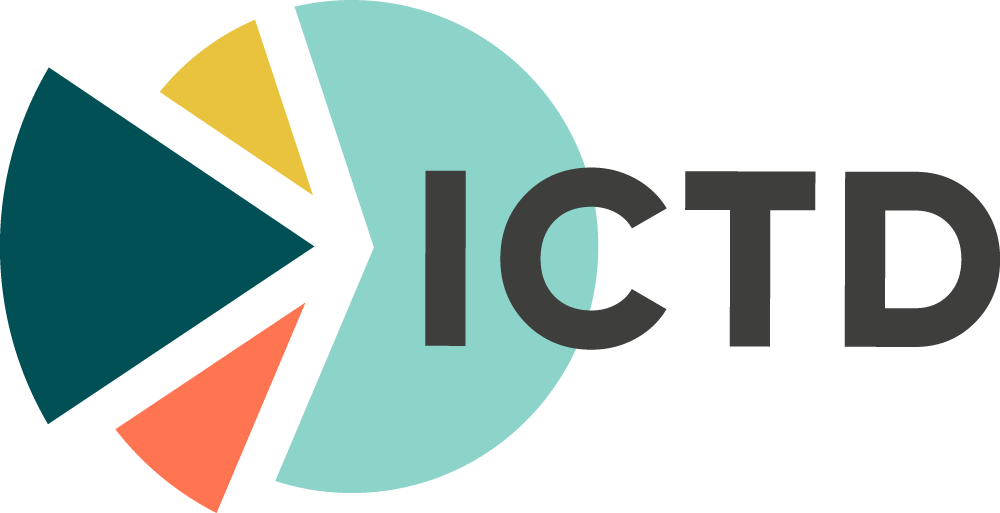
- Abbreviation: ICTD
- Formation: 2010
- Type: research centre
- Headquarters: Library Road, Brighton, East Sussex BN1 9RE
- Location: Brighton, United Kingdom
- Executive Director: Wilson Prichard
- Website: www.ictd.ac

The International Centre for Tax and Development (ICTD) is a research centre based at the Institute of Development Studies. The ICTD is focused on improving tax policy and administration in lower-income countries through collaborative research and engagement. It supports its partners in raising more revenue to fund public services in ways that are efficient, equitable, and strengthen accountability.

The ICTD was founded in 2010. It is funded by the UK's Foreign, Commonwealth and Development Office (FCDO), the Bill & Melinda Gates Foundation, and the Norwegian Agency for Development Cooperation (Norad).

The ICTD fosters a network of social science researchers from developing countries to engage with taxation issues by funding research, delivering research courses and workshops, and collaborating with a range of partners including various African tax administrations and ministries of finance. It disseminates its research evidence to policymakers through publications, communications, and conferences in Africa. Through its work, the ICTD aims to contribute to advancing sustainable development by reducing inequality, fostering inclusive growth, and enhancing governance.

== Research ==
The ICTD's research aims to generate knowledge to make tax systems in lower-income countries, particularly in sub-Saharan Africa, more efficient, fair and transparent. To this end, the ICTD conducts and provides grants for research on the following themes:

- Tax administration and compliance
- Tax and governance
- Subnational and property tax
- Informality and tax
- International tax
- Tax, welfare, and inequality
- Gender and tax

In order to facilitate better research on tax issues, the ICTD created the Government Revenue Dataset, the most complete and accurate cross-country dataset on government revenue, which importantly separates natural resource revenue from other revenue streams. In early 2019, UNU-WIDER launched the GRD Explorer, a tool that allows users to quickly and easily access and visualise the data contained in the Government Revenue Dataset.

== Publications ==
ICTD has published and supported the publication of many working papers, policy briefs, journal articles, and books. They also publish 2-page brief summaries of their research, available in both English and French.

== Programmes ==
=== Local Government Revenue Initiative ===
The Local Government Revenue Initiative (LoGRI) is based at the Munk School of Global Affairs. LoGRI supports governments in raising local revenue more fairly and in ways that promote trust, transparency, and accountability. It does this by:

1. Partnering with governments to provide hands-on support and advice
2. Conducting collaborative, applied research to inform reform projects
3. Developing operational tools, including technology solutions
4. Delivering skills training to develop local capacity

The LoGRI team also engages with regional and international stakeholders on local financing issues, to share insights and shape policy. stimulates and encourages wider use of more effective property tax systems in Africa.
