= List of countries by tax revenue =

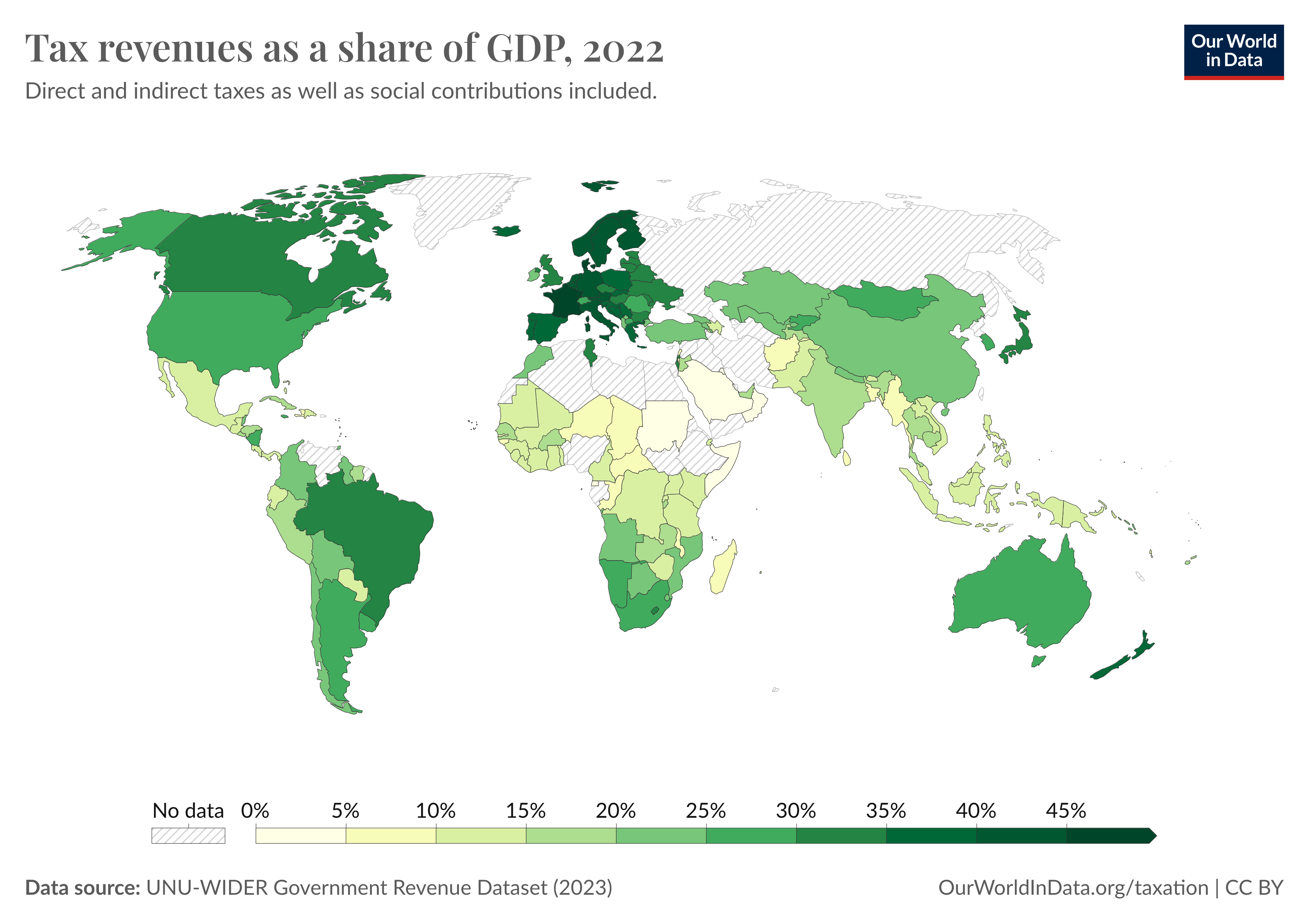
Global map of tax revenues as share of GDP in 2022, according to UNU-WIDER

This article lists countries alphabetically, with total tax revenue as a percentage of gross domestic product (GDP) for the listed countries. The tax percentage for each country listed in the source has been added to the chart.

According to World Bank, "GDP at purchaser's prices is the sum of gross value added by all resident producers in the economy plus any product taxes and minus any subsidies not included in the value of the products. It is calculated without making deductions for depreciation of fabricated assets or for depletion and degradation of natural resources. Data are in current U.S. dollars. Dollar figures for GDP are converted from domestic currencies using single year official exchange rates. For a few countries where the official exchange rate does not reflect the rate effectively applied to actual foreign exchange transactions, an alternative conversion factor is used. Tax revenue refers to compulsory transfers to the central government for public purposes. Certain compulsory transfers such as fines, penalties, and most social security contributions are excluded. Refunds and corrections of erroneously collected tax revenue are treated as negative revenue."

UNU-WIDER data is more complex, total taxes consists of direct and indirect taxes paid to all levels of government. Total taxes excludes social contributions. Sources are IMF Country Reports and OECD Revenue Statistics. Data are in current national currency.

== Hypothetical examples ==
The examples assume the two countries are identical in all other respects.

- In Centralia, people pay 50% of their salary as income tax to the national government. In Federalia, people pay 25% of their salary as national income tax and 25% as provincial income tax. In column 5 (% of GDP), Federalia will have a much lower number than Centralia, because the World Bank data only counts central government taxation.
- In Simplicia, people pay 50% of their salary in income tax to the national government, which pays €500 a month to each old person. In Complexia, people pay 25% of their salary as income tax to the national government. In column 5 (% of GDP), Complexia will have a much lower number than Simplicia, because the World Bank data excludes social security contributions.

Tax revenue and total taxes
Country/Territory Region/Group	World Bank				UNU-WIDER			
Country/Territory Region/Group	GDP	Tax revenue		Year	GDP	Total taxes		Year
Country/Territory Region/Group	billion USD, current prices	billion USD, current prices	% of GDP	Year	billion NC (Note: Values expressed in billions of national currency units), current prices	billion NC, current prices	% of GDP	Year
(United Nations) WORLD	101225.06	14859.08	14.68%	2022				
Aruba					6.25	1.18	18.81%	2022
Afghanistan	18.75	1.86	9.90%	2017	1547.29	104.60	6.76%	2020
Angola	70.90	7.15	10.09%	2019	56144.41	12212.00	21.75%	2022
Anguilla					0.88	0.16	18.18%	2016
Albania	17.93	3.26	18.20%	2021	2073.97	418.60	20.18%	2022
United Arab Emirates	507.06	2.91	0.57%	2022	1863.92	332.40	17.83%	2022
Argentina	631.13	70.38	11.15%	2022	46282.07	11061.53	23.90%	2021
Armenia	19.51	4.26	21.83%	2022	4266.46	766.27	17.96%	2012
Antigua and Barbuda					3.97	0.67	16.78%	2021
Australia	1692.96	399.52	23.60%	2022	1970.80	590.73	29.97%	2020
Austria	470.94	123.56	26.24%	2022	406.15	113.35	27.91%	2021
Azerbaijan	54.83	7.36	13.42%	2021	92.86	12.51	13.47%	2021
Burundi	2.78	0.43	15.64%	2021	7921.69	1286.70	16.24%	2022
Belgium	583.61	134.76	23.09%	2022	502.31	148.35	29.53%	2021
Benin	—N/a	—N/a	10.79%	1979	10838.19	1320.70	12.19%	2022
Burkina Faso	18.82	3.33	17.67%	2022	10945.16	1740.98	15.91%	2021
Bangladesh	416.27	31.81	7.64%	2021	39717.16	3085.00	7.77%	2022
Bulgaria	90.35	19.69	21.80%	2022	120.55	25.50	21.16%	2020
Bahrain	34.62	1.01	2.92%	2020	13.02	0.38	2.92%	2020
Bahamas	13.14	2.16	16.43%	2022	11.21	1.61	14.38%	2021
Bosnia and Herzegovina	24.53	4.68	19.09%	2022	39.11	8.49	21.70%	2021
Belarus	73.78	8.29	11.23%	2022	149721.00	32746.47	21.87%	2020
Belize	2.27	0.48	21.34%	2017	5.90	1.21	20.54%	2022
Bolivia	—N/a	—N/a	16.96%	2007				
Brazil	1951.92	287.44	14.73%	2022	8898.73	2209.55	24.83%	2021
Barbados	4.85	1.33	27.39%	2016	11.33	3.33	29.42%	2022
Brunei					22.94	2.77	12.06%	2022
Bhutan	2.46	0.30	12.28%	2020	175.43	22.37	12.75%	2020
Botswana	20.32	3.99	19.65%	2022	235.42	50.50	21.45%	2022
Central African Republic	2.52	0.21	8.21%	2021	1281.56	104.73	8.17%	2012
Canada	2161.48	277.23	12.83%	2022	2509.62	710.30	28.30%	2021
Switzerland	818.43	74.48	9.10%	2022	730.81	157.88	21.60%	2021
Chile	302.12	64.27	21.27%	2022	240400.00	47108.44	19.60%	2021
China	17881.78	1377.05	7.70%	2022	114500.00	18656.91	16.29%	2021
Ivory Coast	70.17	8.38	11.94%	2022	43681.48	5617.00	12.86%	2022
Cameroon	44.99	5.11	11.35%	2021	23243.66	2986.23	12.85%	2019
Democratic Republic of the Congo	65.80	7.51	11.41%	2022	126300.00	15147.00	11.99%	2022
Republic of the Congo	14.83	0.97	6.51%	2021	7798.68	681.00	8.73%	2022
Colombia	345.33	52.76	15.28%	2022	181200.00	25694.21	14.18%	1999
Comoros					575.69	44.36	7.71%	2022
Cape Verde	1.82	0.33	18.39%	2020	180.74	32.15	17.79%	2020
Costa Rica	69.24	9.94	14.35%	2022	40112.93	5616.99	14.00%	2021
Cuba					545.22	72.37	13.27%	2021
Cyprus	29.25	7.23	24.71%	2022	24.02	5.79	24.11%	2021
Czech Republic	290.57	38.16	13.13%	2022	6108.72	1062.41	17.39%	2021
Germany	4082.47	458.45	11.23%	2022	3601.75	887.24	24.63%	2021
Djibouti					565.34	64.10	11.34%	2020
Dominica					1.65	0.36	21.90%	2022
Denmark	400.17	122.28	30.56%	2022	2504.18	1181.43	43.31%	2023
Dominican Republic	113.54	15.69	13.82%	2022	6185.23	864.00	13.97%	2022
Ecuador	116.59	15.20	13.04%	2022	106.17	14.74	13.88%	2021
Egypt	329.37	41.23	12.52%	2015	6152.60	739.63	12.02%	2020
Eritrea					7.88	1.54	19.53%	2002
Spain	1417.80	224.24	15.82%	2022	1206.84	297.59	24.66%	2021
Estonia	37.92	7.97	21.01%	2022	31.45	6.89	21.91%	2021
Ethiopia	126.77	5.71	4.51%	2022	2690.75	268.46	9.98%	2019
Finland	281.89	59.41	21.08%	2022	250.59	78.03	31.14%	2021
Fiji	4.31	0.68	15.87%	2021	10.65	2.00	18.81%	2022
France	2779.09	684.22	24.62%	2022	2498.82	762.22	30.50%	2021
Federated States of Micronesia	0.37	0.03	7.05%	2020	0.41	0.05	11.26%	2021
Gabon	20.22	1.85	9.13%	2021				
United Kingdom	3088.84	843.35	27.30%	2022	2270.25	621.10	27.36%	2021
Georgia	24.98	5.72	22.90%	2022	60.00	13.55	22.58%	2021
Ghana	74.26	9.13	12.30%	2022	615.26	80.53	13.09%	2022
Guinea	—N/a	—N/a	7.44%	1992	178000.00	20316.00	11.41%	2022
Gambia	—N/a	—N/a	18.20%	1990	120.94	11.16	9.23%	2022
Guinea-Bissau	1.49	0.14	9.16%	2019	1061.06	99.70	9.40%	2022
Equatorial Guinea	13.49	0.90	6.69%	2022	10209.83	509.00	4.99%	2022
Greece	217.58	60.50	27.81%	2022	181.68	47.87	26.35%	2021
Grenada					3.22	0.71	22.19%	2022
Guatemala	95.00	11.30	11.90%	2022	672.90	77.29	11.49%	2021
Guyana					1078.73	226.44	20.99%	2019
Hong Kong					2675.79	375.90	14.05%	2020
Honduras	23.35	3.52	15.07%	2020	684.20	107.95	15.78%	2021
Croatia	72.00	15.41	21.41%	2022	58.21	14.29	24.55%	2021
Haiti					2168.22	109.87	5.07%	2022
Hungary	177.01	41.47	23.43%	2022	55125.56	13194.78	23.94%	2021
Indonesia	1319.08	153.08	11.60%	2022	19590000.00	2035000.00	10.39%	2022
India	2702.93	324.82	12.02%	2018	272300.00	46429.04	17.05%	2022
Ireland	533.14	92.08	17.27%	2022	426.28	76.16	17.86%	2021
Iran	—N/a	—N/a	7.36%	2009	12250000.00	709652.00	5.79%	2014
Iraq	233.64	3.14	1.34%	2019	130600.00	1800.00	1.38%	2009
Iceland	28.70	6.46	22.52%	2022	3244.90	1042.36	32.12%	2021
Israel	525.00	131.31	25.01%	2022	1578.04	428.98	27.18%	2021
Italy	2066.97	515.16	24.92%	2022	1787.68	528.77	29.58%	2021
Jamaica	13.81	3.55	25.71%	2020	2475.62	682.06	27.55%	2022
Jordan	48.65	8.52	17.51%	2022	34.62	6.05	17.47%	2022
Japan	—N/a	—N/a	11.38%	1993	549400.00	109882.70	20.00%	2021
Kazakhstan	197.11	18.62	9.45%	2021	103900.00	20590.00	19.82%	2022
Kenya	109.70	14.55	13.26%	2021	13671.14	1985.10	14.52%	2022
Kyrgyzstan	12.13	2.37	19.54%	2022	919.45	225.08	24.48%	2022
Cambodia	26.96	4.41	16.36%	2021	110500.00	18084.22	16.37%	2021
Kiribati	0.27	0.05	20.22%	2022	0.30	0.08	27.38%	2021
Saint Kitts and Nevis	0.88	0.13	15.04%	2020	2.39	0.36	15.03%	2020
South Korea	1673.92	308.75	18.44%	2022	2072000.00	456875.00	22.05%	2021
Kosovo					8.92	2.22	24.86%	2022
Kuwait	—N/a	—N/a	1.49%	1998	32.45	0.70	2.16%	2020
Laos	15.47	1.87	12.11%	2022	217400.00	23082.00	10.62%	2022
Lebanon	23.13	1.32	5.68%	2021	271915.97	15457.87	5.68%	2021
Liberia	—N/a	—N/a	12.46%	2013	3.97	0.49	12.41%	2022
Libya					116.76	1.20	1.03%	2012
Saint Lucia	2.00	0.36	18.23%	2017	5.63	1.07	19.10%	2022
Liechtenstein					6.01	1.27	21.14%	2020
Sri Lanka	74.14	5.40	7.28%	2022	23688.22	1751.00	7.39%	2022
Lesotho	2.29	0.72	31.31%	2022	41.89	13.89	33.15%	2022
Lithuania	71.01	14.99	21.10%	2022	56.18	12.43	22.12%	2021
Luxembourg	81.64	21.20	25.97%	2022	72.30	20.25	28.01%	2021
Latvia	40.42	9.21	22.79%	2022	33.59	7.00	20.83%	2021
Macau	24.46	4.18	17.07%	2022	241.16	46.83	19.42%	2021
Morocco	130.91	28.95	22.12%	2022	1385.24	294.20	21.24%	2022
Moldova	14.51	2.75	18.94%	2022	272.92	57.55	21.09%	2022
Madagascar	15.30	1.42	9.25%	2022	62395.11	5762.00	9.23%	2022
Maldives	5.25	1.02	19.45%	2021	83.00	15.71	18.92%	2021
Mexico	1463.32	196.63	13.44%	2022	25803.51	3579.47	13.87%	2021
Marshall Islands	0.24	0.04	17.23%	2020	0.24	0.04	17.00%	2020
North Macedonia	14.00	2.44	17.39%	2021	720.41	125.70	17.45%	2021
Mali	17.47	2.47	14.16%	2020	11856.21	1591.00	13.42%	2022
Malta	18.36	4.29	23.37%	2022	15.00	3.64	24.23%	2021
Myanmar	75.07	4.52	6.02%	2019	105300.00	6777.88	6.44%	2019
Montenegro					4.96	1.32	26.66%	2021
Mongolia	15.29	2.58	16.91%	2021	43555.49	10101.00	23.19%	2021
Mozambique	18.41	4.28	23.25%	2022	1145.46	244.30	21.33%	2022
Mauritania					3809.46	477.00	12.52%	2022
Mauritius	12.93	2.46	19.05%	2022	564.31	100.74	17.85%	2022
Malawi	13.13	1.68	12.78%	2022	11778.00	978.30	8.31%	2022
Malaysia	407.03	47.44	11.65%	2022	1788.18	208.80	11.68%	2022
Namibia	12.57	3.41	27.17%	2022	202.00	53.93	26.70%	2022
Niger	—N/a	—N/a	11.76%	1980	9474.52	905.00	9.55%	2022
Nigeria					32995.38	2366.00	7.17%	2007
Nicaragua	15.65	3.11	19.84%	2022	492.85	101.60	20.61%	2021
Netherlands	1009.40	243.38	24.11%	2022	856.36	227.53	26.57%	2021
Norway	593.73	185.68	31.27%	2022	4211.62	1349.03	32.03%	2021
Nepal	36.92	6.46	17.49%	2021	4851.63	1002.00	20.65%	2022
Nauru	0.12	0.06	44.35%	2020	0.20	0.09	44.31%	2021
New Zealand	246.73	73.86	29.93%	2022	352.37	121.45	34.47%	2021
Oman					44.09	1.54	3.49%	2022
Pakistan	—N/a	—N/a	7.50%	2000	55795.52	6312.98	11.31%	2021
Panama	67.41	5.03	7.46%	2021	71.97	5.51	7.65%	2022
Peru	226.35	36.04	15.92%	2021	876.68	137.47	15.68%	2021
Philippines	404.35	59.11	14.62%	2022	19410.57	2742.72	14.13%	2021
Palau	0.26	0.05	17.93%	2020	0.26	0.05	18.15%	2020
Papua New Guinea	31.60	4.67	14.79%	2022	110.09	13.83	12.56%	2022
Poland	689.76	119.11	17.27%	2022	2623.95	622.89	23.74%	2021
Portugal	255.20	58.82	23.05%	2022	214.74	53.21	24.78%	2021
Paraguay	41.95	4.31	10.27%	2022	270600.00	26409.26	9.76%	2021
Palestine	18.11	3.89	21.47%	2021	58.50	3.89	6.65%	2021
Qatar					409.94	18.17	4.43%	2008
Romania	298.89	47.88	16.02%	2022	1187.40	187.95	15.83%	2021
Russia	2266.03	248.59	10.97%	2022	107700.00	24845.76	23.07%	2020
Rwanda	10.17	1.53	15.07%	2020	13091.34	1877.00	14.34%	2022
Saudi Arabia	1108.57	86.16	7.77%	2022	3174.69	140.00	4.41%	2018
Sudan	42.63	3.15	7.39%	2016	5173.85	157.80	3.05%	2020
Senegal	27.62	5.17	18.70%	2022	17092.71	3163.00	18.50%	2022
Singapore	498.47	59.98	12.03%	2022	643.55	73.70	11.45%	2022
Solomon Islands	1.57	0.32	20.67%	2022	13.02	2.69	20.64%	2022
Sierra Leone					55331.95	5921.00	10.70%	2022
El Salvador	29.04	5.72	19.69%	2021	28.74	5.72	19.90%	2021
San Marino	1.86	0.32	17.30%	2021	1.60	0.27	17.04%	2022
Somalia	9.20	0.00	0.00%	2020	8.16	0.18	2.23%	2022
Serbia	63.56	15.96	25.11%	2022	6270.10	1611.63	25.70%	2021
São Tomé and Príncipe					12.83	1.48	11.55%	2022
Suriname					86.77	16.65	19.19%	2022
Slovakia	115.58	22.54	19.50%	2022	98.52	19.50	19.79%	2021
Slovenia	60.06	10.89	18.14%	2022	52.21	10.98	21.03%	2021
Sweden	590.41	160.08	27.11%	2022	5462.04	1829.72	33.50%	2021
Eswatini	4.85	1.17	24.13%	2021	73.01	18.04	24.71%	2022
Seychelles	1.38	0.36	26.18%	2020	27.34	7.39	27.03%	2022
Syria					2448.06	258.00	10.54%	2008
Chad					6130.69	482.78	7.87%	2018
Togo	8.17	1.16	14.19%	2022	4230.51	556.53	13.16%	2019
Thailand	495.65	71.28	14.38%	2022	16166.60	2517.07	15.57%	2021
Tajikistan	10.71	1.11	10.34%	2022	115.74	22.62	19.54%	2022
Turkmenistan					83.60	9.21	11.02%	2008
Timor-Leste	3.20	0.69	21.67%	2022	1.65	0.14	8.71%	2016
Tonga	0.48	0.10	21.30%	2020	1.14	0.21	18.48%	2022
Trinidad and Tobago	23.78	3.93	16.55%	2019	188.43	38.17	20.26%	2022
Tunisia	—N/a	—N/a	20.12%	2012	119.63	26.85	22.44%	2020
Turkey	907.12	145.97	16.09%	2022	7248.79	1318.46	18.19%	2021
Tuvalu					0.09	0.01	14.02%	2022
Tanzania	79.16	9.08	11.47%	2023	178400.00	20000.00	11.21%	2022
Uganda	45.57	5.72	12.55%	2022	173100.00	20425.00	11.80%	2022
Ukraine	161.99	27.04	16.69%	2022	5459.57	1358.57	24.88%	2021
Uruguay	53.67	9.94	18.51%	2020	2583.55	519.43	20.11%	2021
United States	25744.11	3135.09	12.18%	2022	23315.08	4654.53	19.96%	2021
Uzbekistan	60.22	8.90	14.79%	2020	738400.00	138258.00	18.72%	2021
Saint Vincent and the Grenadines	0.84	0.20	23.80%	2017	2.36	0.63	26.67%	2021
Venezuela					6025.33	1216.39	20.19%	2015
Vietnam					8480000.00	1180000.00	13.92%	2021
Vanuatu	0.95	0.15	15.88%	2021	106.35	11.54	10.85%	2021
Samoa	0.84	0.21	25.02%	2021	2.17	0.55	25.36%	2022
Yemen					7586.55	534.00	7.04%	2012
South Africa	405.27	105.82	26.11%	2022	6192.50	1701.83	27.48%	2021
Zambia	22.10	3.71	16.78%	2021	483.41	79.49	16.44%	2022
Zimbabwe	34.16	2.46	7.21%	2018	3185.62	474.26	14.89%	2021
SIDS (Small Island Developing States)	—N/a	—N/a						
SIDS: Pacific	9.49	1.71	18.02%	2021				
LDCs (Least developed countries)	1150.50	121.51	10.56%	2019				
Low & middle income economies (WB)	36438.64	3899.25	10.70%	2022				
Low-income economies (WB)	383.74	38.92	10.14%	2016				
Middle-income economies (WB)	35907.87	3841.91	10.70%	2022				
Lower middle income economies (WB)	5979.74	736.72	12.32%	2018				
Upper middle income economies (WB)	28567.59	3006.38	10.52%	2022				
High-income economies (WB)	64444.45	10559.25	16.39%	2022				
European Union	16761.50	3341.61	19.94%	2022				
OECD (Organisation for Economic Co-operation and Development)	60170.09	10103.23	16.79%	2022				
Notes: WB: GDP at purchaser's prices is the sum of gross value added by all resident producers in the economy plus any product taxes and minus any subsidies not included in the value of the products. It is calculated without making deductions for depreciation of fabricated assets or for depletion and degradation of natural resources. Data are in current U.S. dollars. Dollar figures for GDP are converted from domestic currencies using single year official exchange rates. For a few countries where the official exchange rate does not reflect the rate effectively applied to actual foreign exchange transactions, an alternative conversion factor is used. Tax revenue refers to compulsory transfers to the central government for public purposes. Certain compulsory transfers such as fines, penalties, and most social security contributions are excluded. Refunds and corrections of erroneously collected tax revenue are treated as negative revenue. UN-WIDER: Total taxes consists of taxes, social contributions, grants receivable, and other revenue. Data are in current national currency.

== See also ==
- List of countries by government budget
- List of countries by government budget
- List of countries by social welfare spending
- Taxation in the United States
- Laffer curve
- List of countries by tax rates
- Tax rates in Europe
