= Armenian Customs Service =

Armenian Customs Service Հայաստանի մաքսային ծառայություն
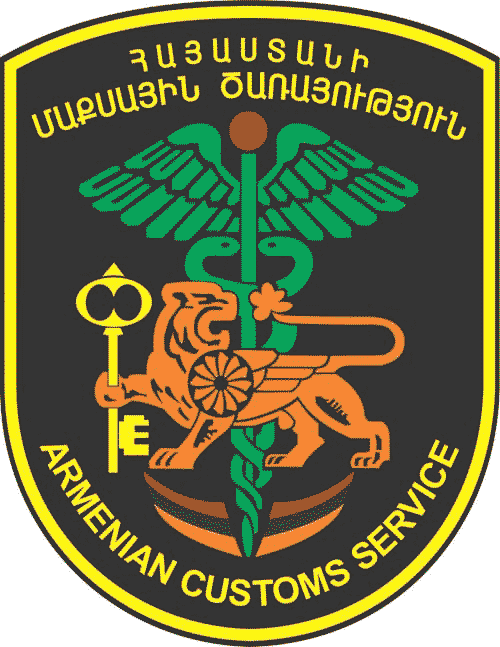
- Armenian Customs Service emblem
- Common name: Armenian Customs
- Abbreviation: ACS

Agency overview
- Formed: January 4, 1992; 34 years ago

Jurisdictional structure
- Operations jurisdiction: Armenia
- Constituting instrument: Law on Customs Service

Operational structure
- Headquarters: Yerevan
- Agency executive: Chairman of State Revenue Committee
- Parent agency: State Revenue Committee of Armenia

Website
- src.am/en

The Armenian Customs Service (Armenian: Հայաստանի մաքսային ծառայություն) is a subsidiary department of the State Revenue Committee responsible for customs services on behalf of the Armenian government, headquartered in Yerevan.

== History ==
The Armenian Customs Service is the authoritative body which regulates customs services in Armenia, ensures compliance of Armenia's international trade and customs agreements, and is responsible for the collection of customs payments and tariffs for foreign trade. The department was established on 4 January 1992 and ensures that customs regulations are followed for incoming trade and goods to Armenia. Department staff are also responsible to ensure that contraband items which are prohibited for entry are monitored at all checkpoints. Between 2018 and 2020, the Armenian Customs Service was nominated to represent the Audit Committee of the World Customs Organization, representing the European region alongside the Tax and Customs Administration of the Netherlands.

== International cooperation ==
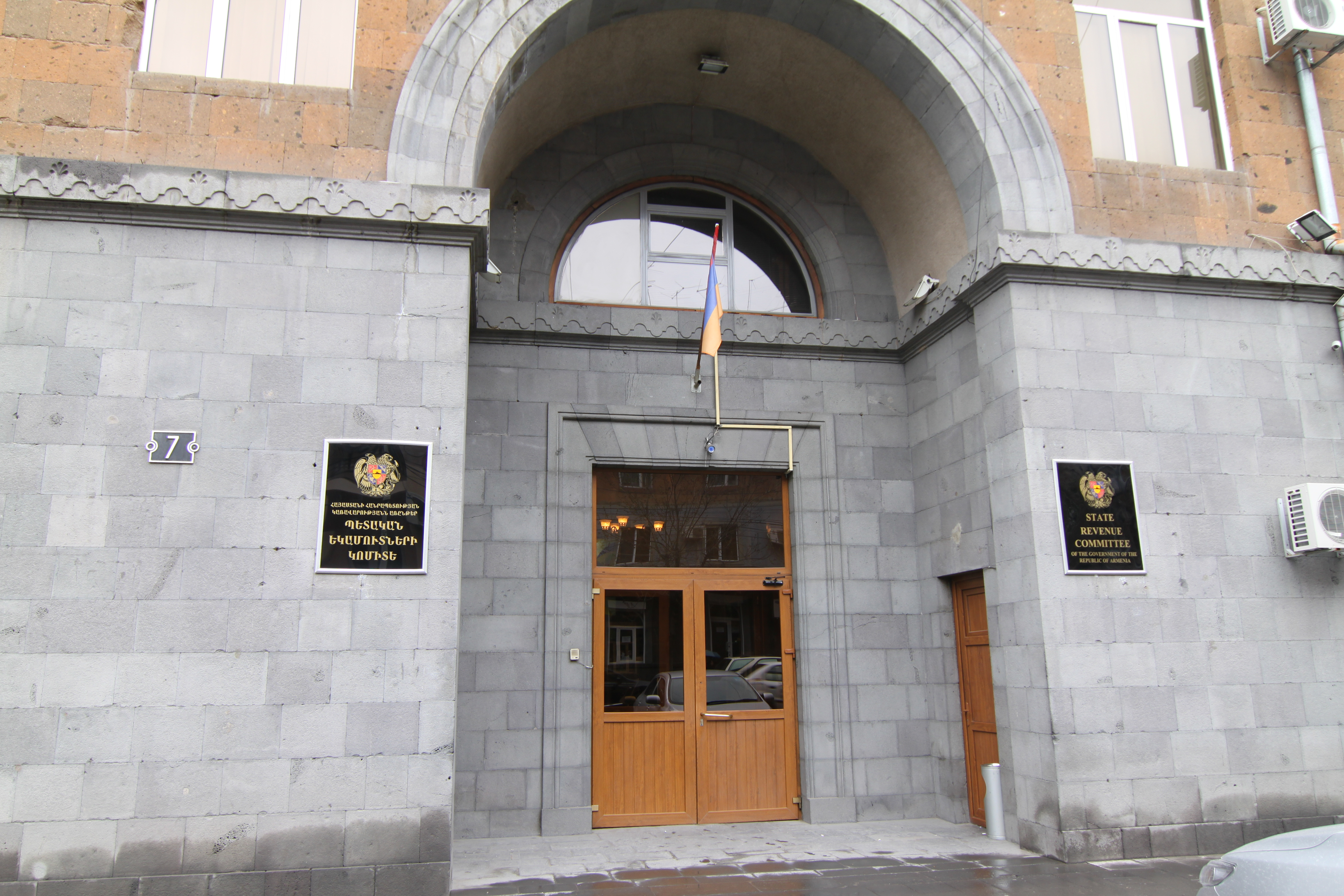
Headquarters of the State Revenue Committee (housing both the Armenian Customs Service and the Armenian Tax Service).

=== Bilateral agreements ===
The Armenian Customs Service maintains bilateral customs agreements with the following countries: Austria, Argentina, Belarus, Bulgaria, China, Egypt, Georgia, Greece, Iran, Italy, Latvia, Lebanon, Moldova, Kazakhstan, Kyrgyzstan, Tajikistan, Turkmenistan, Ukraine, and the United Arab Emirates. In 2013, the department held training events with U.S. Customs and Border Protection delegates, with the goal to modernize customs services and improve inspection quality. A similar event was held in 2014. In 2017, representatives from the department held cooperation talks with the Federal Customs Service of Russia. In 2021, the Armenian Customs Service launched a twinning partnership jointly with the Finnish Customs and Lithuanian customs services.

=== Multilateral cooperation ===
Within the framework of the European Neighbourhood Policy, Armenia and the European Union have agreements to deepen and expand Armenia-EU relations. The Armenia-EU Comprehensive and Enhanced Partnership Agreement was ratified in March 2021, which facilitates and enhances EU-Armenian trade relations, including harmonizing Armenian customs regulations to EU standards.

Armenia is a member of the Eurasian Economic Union, which maintains a customs union and free trade zone among five countries in Eurasia. Similarly, Armenia is a member of the Commonwealth of Independent States, which maintains its own customs legislations and rules among all members. Armenia is also a full member of the World Customs Organization and the World Trade Organization.

==== Multilateral agreements ====
In addition, Armenia has signed several customs and trade regulatory treaties, including the:

- CMR Convention
- Convention on Psychotropic Substances
- Customs Convention on Containers
- General Agreement on Tariffs and Trade
- International Convention on the Harmonization of Frontier Controls of Goods
- Montreal Convention
- The Istanbul Convention on Temporary Admission
- TIR Convention
- TRACECA

== See also ==
- Economy of Armenia
- Member states of the World Customs Organization
- Ministry of Finance (Armenia)
- Transport in Armenia
