= State Revenue Committee (Armenia) =

State Revenue Committee of Armenia logo

The State Revenue Committee (SRC) (Armenian: Հայաստանի պետական եկամուտների կոմիտե, romanized: Petakan yekamutneri komite) is the tax and customs authority of the Armenian government, headquartered in Yerevan. The State Revenue Committee is the regulating body, established under Armenian law, to regulate tax services, customs regulations, and customs services in Armenia. The committee works closely with the Central Bank of Armenia and directly oversees the Armenian Customs Service and the Armenian Tax Service.

== International cooperation ==
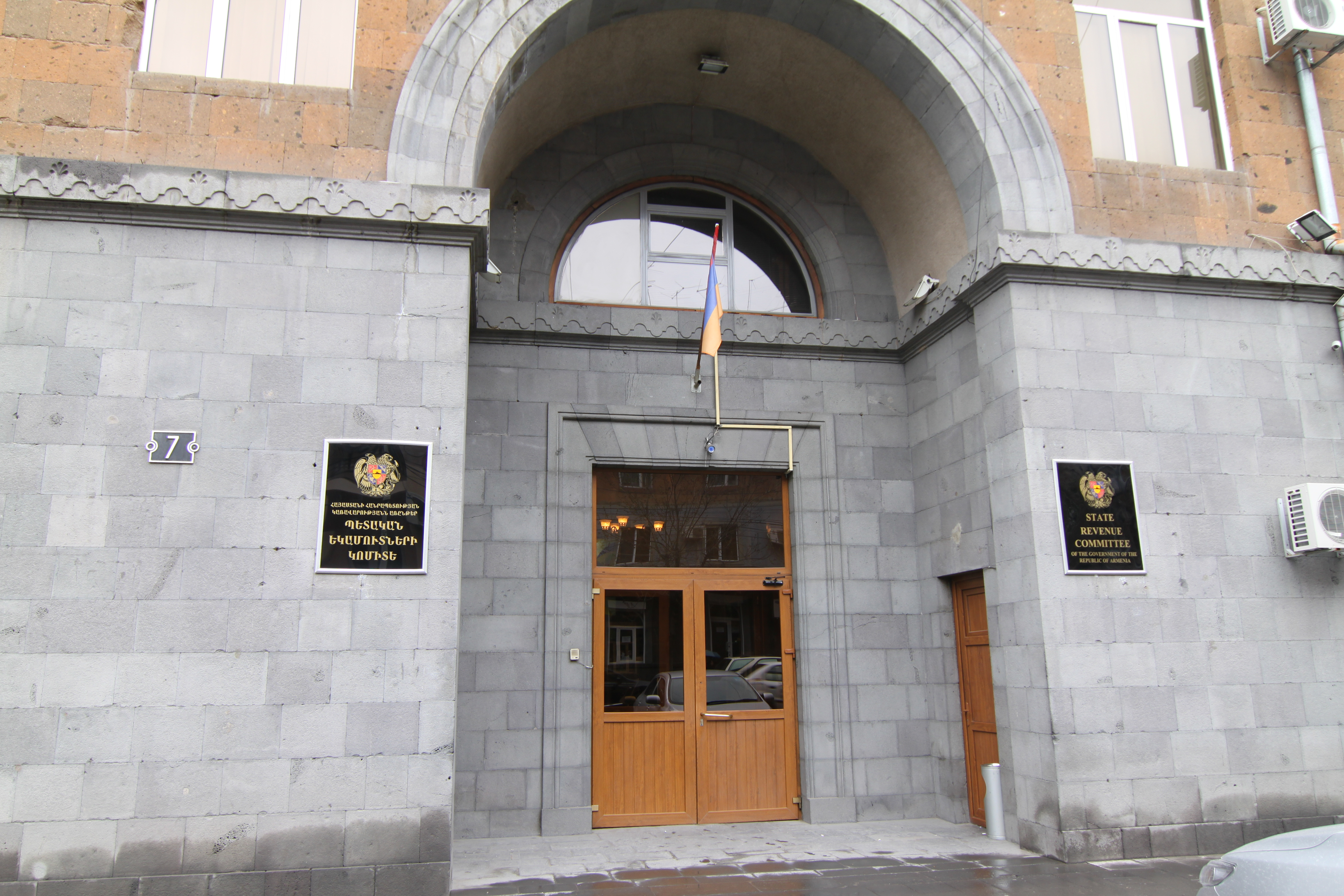
Headquarters of the State Revenue Committee (housing both the Armenian Customs Service and the Armenian Tax Service).

Former Head of the SRC, Suren Adamyan, stated that “In the field of tax administration reforms the SRC closely collaborates with the International Monetary Fund, World Bank, U.S. Agency for International Development, and the European Union. Armenia became a full member of the World Customs Organization in 1992.

The SRC joined the Intra-European Organisation of Tax Administrations in 2010. Suren Adamyan stated, "Our purpose is to introduce the best European practice in the field of tax administration. By becoming a full member of the Intra-European Organization of Tax Administrations we aim to have an active participation in practical discussions relating to tax administration."

In October 2021, members of the committee held a meeting with representatives from the Customs Service of Cuba. The development of mutual customs cooperation was discussed.

On 3 November 2021, Rustam Badasyan received the Head of the European Union Delegation to Armenia, Ambassador Andrea Wiktorin. The meeting discussed issues related to the implementation of the modernization of customs points and digitization of the customs process in Armenia, with the support of the EU and the European Bank for Reconstruction and Development.

== Leadership ==
- Rustam Badasyan, Head of the State Revenue Committee
- Artyom Smbatyan, First Deputy

== See also ==
- Economy of Armenia
- List of countries by tax rates
- List of countries by tax revenue to GDP ratio
- Ministry of Finance (Armenia)
- Revenue service
- Taxation in Armenia
