= COVID-19 pandemic in Mauritius =

- Disease: COVID-19
- Pathogen: SARS-CoV-2
- Location: Mauritius
- First outbreak: Wuhan, China
- Index case: Camp de Masque Pavé
- Arrival date: 18 March 2020 (6 years, 7 months, 1 week and 5 days ago)
- Confirmed cases: 332,300 (updated 18 September 2026)
- Deaths: 1,074 (updated 18 September 2026)

Government website
- www.covid19.mu besafemoris.mu

The COVID-19 pandemic was confirmed to have reached Mauritius in March 2020. Since the first three cases of COVID-19 were confirmed, the Mauritian authorities have been conducting 'Contact tracing': people who have been in contact with infected patients have been placed under quarantine, including doctors, nurses and police officers. No cases have been reported in Agaléga and St. Brandon. Mauritius scored 100 in the Oxford University COVID-19 government response tracker. No new cases through local transmission has been detected in Mauritius since 26 April 2020, since then, all the new cases which were reported on the island were imported cases from passengers who were repatriated to Mauritius and were admitted to quarantine centers upon their arrival. On 29 May 2020, the Mauritian government announced the end of lockdown as from 30 May 2020 at 00.00. However, some restrictions was still imposed on certain activities, in public spaces and public gatherings. On 12 June 2020, the Prime Minister announced that the decision was taken to lift all business and activity lockdowns ordered earlier to cope with the COVID-19, as from Monday 15 June 2020. Consequently, beaches, markets, gyms, parks, Village Halls, Community Centres, cinema and other public places became accessible to the public but the wearing of masks and social distancing will still be compulsory. Schools resumed as from 1 July 2020. As at 12 June 2020, 10% of the population were already tested with a total of 142,889 tests: 32,257 PCR tests and 110,632 Rapid Tests.

== Background ==
On 12 January 2020, the World Health Organization (WHO) confirmed that a novel coronavirus was the cause of a respiratory illness in a cluster of people in Wuhan City, Hubei Province, China, which was reported to the WHO on 31 December 2019.

The case fatality ratio for COVID-19 has been much lower than that of SARS of 2003, but the transmission has been significantly greater, with a significant total death toll.

== Timeline ==
=== January 2020 ===
- As at 23 January 2020, passengers inbound from China were admitted to quarantine center. This measure was extended to other Asian countries such as South Korea and Japan.
- On 24 January 2020, all passengers irrespective of their nationality, travelling from Wuhan City, Hubei Province of China or who have visited Wuhan during the last 14 days were immediately admitted in the Quarantine Ward of the New Souillac Hospital for observation. Passengers, irrespective of their Nationality, coming from other provinces of China and who are not showing any signs or symptoms suggestive of the infection at the airport (for example, fever or cough) was allowed to leave the airport but placed under surveillance for a period of 14 days. Passengers, irrespective of their Nationality, coming from other provinces of China and who are showing signs and symptoms of the infection upon arrival at the airport were immediately admitted at the isolation ward of the New Souillac Hospital for further investigation and management. The Ministry of Health and Wellness requested all tour operators in Mauritius not to accept any passengers from Wuhan, more so, as the Chinese Authorities are preventing Chinese citizens from entering or leaving Wuhan City.
- On 28 January 2020, the Minister of Health and Wellness, Dr Kailesh Kumar Jagutpal, pointed out that all passengers will have to provide a valid address in order to facilitate screening of symptomatic cases by Health inspectors. As at that date, there was nine symptomatic cases, two people who returned from China and the other seven have been put in the Quarantine Ward of the Souillac hospital. He confirmed that these people do not have coronavirus.
- On 31 January 2020, the Minister of Health and Wellness, Dr Kailesh Jagutpal, effected a site visit at Sir Seewoosagur Ramgoolam International Airport to take stock of the measures that were taken by his Ministry following the outbreak of the Novel Coronavirus in China. The minister Jagutpal expressed his satisfaction concerning the screening measures put in place at the airport and welcomed the collaboration of all the airport agencies for the smooth running of this health monitoring. He reassured that all thermal scanners are effective and that the concerned authorities must continue on the defined set of measures put in place regarding the screening process until the end of the current crisis.

=== February 2020 ===
- On 2 February 2020, twelve Mauritian nationals (including one infant) was evacuated, from Wuhan following the outbreak of the Novel Coronavirus in China. The Mauritians was taken to a seaside holiday camp at Carry-le-Rouet, near Marseille, in France, where they were kept in quarantine for 14 days. Thereafter, arrangements was made for them to travel to Mauritius. Two of the 14 Mauritian nationals who initially requested evacuation from Wuhan decided to stay back.
- On 3 February 2020, all passengers travelling from China was invariably and systematically being put on surveillance (quarantine or isolation) for a period of 14 days; passengers and staff members travelling by cruise ships and private yachts were automatically subjected to body temperature check both on departure and arrival; and surveillance was carried out for all crew members of cargo ships including fishing vessels.
- On 4 February 2020, a temporary ban on the importation of live animals, live fish and products of animal origin from China was imposed, following the outbreak of the novel Coronavirus.
- On 11 February 2020, the Minister of Health and Welfare indicated that 57 people was placed in quarantine, 28 at New Souillac Hospital and 29 at Anse-La-Raie Youth Centre.
- On 28 February 2020, foreign passengers coming from or having stayed in Italy and Iran during the last 14 days were not allowed to enter Mauritius. As for Mauritians coming from these countries, they were automatically placed in quarantine for a period of two weeks.

=== March 2020 ===
- On 16 March 2020, Mauritius extended travel restrictions for a period of two weeks on foreign passengers coming from or having transited during the last 14 days in countries of the European Union, including the United Kingdom and Switzerland. Also, all foreign passengers coming or transiting from Reunion Island were not allowed to enter Mauritius for the next two weeks. As for Mauritians coming from these countries, they were automatically placed in quarantine for a period of two weeks.
- On 18 March 2020, the Prime Minister Pravind Jugnauth confirmed that there were three cases of COVID-19 in Mauritius.
- On 19 March 2020, the Prime Minister announced that the country would be under "sanitary" lockdown for two weeks as from 6:00 AM on 20 March 2020. During the lockdown, only the essential services (police, hospitals, dispensaries, private clinics, firefighters) and certain economic activities (shops, banks, supermarkets, bakeries, pharmacies) and minimum public transport service would operate. The Mauritian government received the help of several hotels around the island, as at 19 March 2020, at least 1700 hotel rooms had been provided to place people under quarantine. On the same day, an incident was reported at Beau-Bassin Prison, prisoners wanted to leave the prisons, the Special Supporting Unit (SSU) and Groupement d'Intervention de la Police Mauricienne (GIPM) had to intervene. Sixteen prison officers were injured.
- On 20 March 2020, the Government of Mauritius announced that a COVID-19 Work Access Permit would be granted by the Monitoring Committee – COVID-19 to employers in specific sectors. This would allow their employees to move to their workplaces.
- On 24 March 2020, the Prime Minister announced that the country would be under complete lock-down until 31 March 2020 with only essential services such as police, hospitals, dispensaries, private clinics, firefighters and banks being open. All other activities would be banned during the curfew period. He also announced that all supermarkets, shops and bakeries would also be closed until 31 March 2020. Following rumors on social media that a group of individuals were planning to attack supermarkets, the Special Mobile Force (SMF) quickly secured all major supermarkets around the island. A man posted on Facebook claiming that a supermarket and police station were already under attack, he later apologized and said that he had misinterpreted the information that he received. The man was arrested by the Central Criminal Investigation Department (CCID) on the same night for publishing fake news.
- On 26 March 2020, the government set up the COVID-19 Solidarity Fund, whose collected funds would be used to help people who have been affected by the pandemic. A mobile application named "beSafeMoris" was launched by the Ministry of Technology and Ministry of Health. The App provides latest news along with measures to prevent the proliferation of coronavirus. The Deputy Commissioner of Police reported that 175 people had been charged for not respecting the curfew. The Chief Commissioner of Rodrigues, Serge Clair announced that all flights to Rodrigues island would be suspended until further notice. The Supreme Court of Mauritius issued a communique to inform the public that all courts will be closed and Magistrates will be available through electronic devices for urgent matters such as request for bail, cancellation of arrest warrant and protection orders for children and victims of domestic violence.
- On 30 March 2020, the Prime Minister, Mr Pravind Kumar Jugnauth, announced that the sanitary curfew which started on 23 March at 20 00 hours will be extended until 15 April 2020. He also announced that supermarkets, excluding bakeries, would restart operations as from 2 April 2020. Customers will be allowed to enter supermarkets as per the alphabetical order of their names during specific days. It will be compulsory to bring their National Identity cards, wear masks and basic essential products would be limited to three units per person.

=== April 2020 ===
- On 3 April 2020, the European Union contributed MUR 11.3 million to the Covid-2019 Solidarity Fund. As at 3 April 2020, MUR 28,025,759 had been collected.
- On 5 April 2020, the Minister of Foreign Affairs announced that 231 tonnes of equipment, including masks, overalls and other protective accessories for healthcare staff from Guangzhou and Beijing would be reaching Mauritius as from 10 April 2020.
- On 9 April 2020, the Mauritius Revenue Authority reported that out of 160,000 applications received for the Self Employed Scheme, more than 80,000 self-employed individuals already received MUR 5,100 and 11,000 employers benefited from the Wage Assistance Scheme. The Mauritius Export Association (MEXA) reported that its members already produced 300,000 protective masks against the COVID-19.
- On 9 April 2020, the Prime Minister, Pravind Kumar Jugnauth, during a videoconference from his residence, announced that the lockdown will be extended to Monday 4 May 2020, to further contain the spread of the COVID-19 in the country. With regard to Rodrigues and Agalega islands, the lockdown will end on 15 April 2020, barring the education sector.
- On 13 April 2020, IBL Ltd launched the COVID-19 HealthBot, it is a chatbot which allows users to know if they have symptoms of COVID-19.
- On 15 April 2020, India sent 13 tonnes of medication and 500,000 Hydroxychloroquine tablets to Mauritius. Mauritius was among the first countries to receive supplies of this medicine after a special exemption was granted by India. On that day, a second donation of medical equipments from Jack Ma arrived in Mauritius.
- As at 23 April 2020, a total of 8,304 fines for alleged breaches of COVID-19 lockdown laws were issued since the unprecedented emergency measures were announced on 23 March 2020 to prevent the spread of the COVID-19 in the country. However, despite the curfew measures and the Police Force's best efforts, it was observed that many people refused to follow instructions. Consequently, the Police Force reinforced and reorganise its patrol operations and became more stringent against the non-compliance of curfew order.

=== May 2020 ===
- On 1 May 2020, the Prime Minister announced that the ongoing COVID-19 curfew will be extended to 1 June 2020 and schools will remain closed until 1 August 2020. As from 15 May 2020, more businesses will be allowed to operate, namely bakeries, hardware stores and fish markets and the opening hours of supermarkets will be extended to 20 00 hrs. Banks will continue to operate under strict hygiene protocol.
- On 3 May 2020, a petition was launched to urge the Mauritian government to rename Flacq Hospital in honour of Dr Bruno Cheong who died from the coronavirus after he was infected by a patient.
- On 10 May 2020, the spokesperson of the National Communication Committee on COVID-19, Dr Zouberr Joomaye stated that the government in collaboration with Mauritius Telecom developed a new web link for the online application of Work Access Permits (WAP) on beSafeMoris website to enable those who need to circulate as from 15 May 2020 to apply online for a WAP. Applicants will eventually receive their WAPs through emails. The online application for private sector organisations was operational since Friday 8 May 2020. Applications for the public sector organisations as well as for individuals and self-employed persons was opened on 11 May 2020. He also pointed out that 34 CAB Offices will assist individuals and self-employed persons who do not have internet facilities, to apply online for the WAP.
- On 13 May 2020, the government elaborated strict guidelines and regulations that both commuters and public transport operators will have to adhere to. These guidelines and regulations were in line with Government's strategy to ensure that there is no risk of the propagation of COVID-19 as the country gradually prepares itself to allow certain economic activities to resume as from 15 May 2020.
- On 14 May 2020, the Mauritius Police Force already delivered some 200 000 digital Work Access Permits (WAP) through the online application system put in place on the besafemoris.mu website. Despite the confinement period, self-employed persons, authorised to operate as from 15 May 2020, as well as public and private sector employees gradually resume their work until the resumption of economic activities once the lockdown ends on 1 June 2020.
- On 15 May 2020, Mauritius embarks on the first phase of easing its lockdown protocol. The Prime Minister announced that Flacq Hospital will be renamed after Dr Bruno Cheong who died from the coronavirus.
- On 29 May 2020, the Mauritian government announced the end of lockdown for 30 May at 00.00. However, some restrictions was imposed on certain activities, in public spaces and public gatherings. As at 29 May 2020, Mauritius registered only three imported COVID-19 cases, these patients were passengers in quarantine but the island did not recorded any new local case over more than a month.

=== June 2020 ===
- On 12 June 2020, the Prime Minister announced that following the Cabinet Meeting, the decision was taken to lift all business and activity lockdowns ordered earlier to cope with the COVID-19, as from Monday 15 June 2020. Consequently, beaches, markets, gyms, parks, Village Halls, Community Centres, cinema and other public places became accessible to the public but the wearing of masks will still be compulsory. The Prime Minister stated that he is aware that since the closing of the country frontiers, Mauritians stranded abroad have faced very difficult situations and his Government is putting in much effort to repatriate them. A total of 1,836 stranded citizens have already been repatriated, and another 800 Mauritians will come home by the end of June.

=== July to December 2020 ===
In July, 1164 stranded citizens were due to be repatriated, subject to testing negative for COVID-19 prior to boarding the flight. The Prime Minister stated that the school calendar has been reviewed and the resumption of classes will be on 1 July 2020 instead of 1 August 2020 as previously announced.

Modelling by WHO's Regional Office for Africa suggests that due to under-reporting, the true number of infections in 2020 was around 0.3 million while the true number of COVID-19 deaths in 2020 was around 140.

=== January to December 2021 ===
Mass vaccination commenced on 26 January 2021, initially with 100,000 doses of AstraZeneca's Covishield vaccine donated by India. Beneficiaries are required to waive all claims for adverse events following immunisation.

Mauritius went back in lockdown on 10 March 2021 at 6am local time, initially until 25 March but subsequently extended until 30 April.

The first COVID-19 case on Rodrigues was confirmed on 10 October 2021. No further cases were recorded on the island until the end of January 2022 when cases grew exponentially from a single case on 26 January to 710 on 31 January.

The first two cases of the Omicron variant were reported on 10 December 2021.

Modelling by WHO's Regional Office for Africa suggests that due to under-reporting, the true number of cases by the end of 2021 was around 0.6 million while the true number of COVID-19 deaths was around 871.

== Statistics ==
- The first patient was a 52-year-old man who had dual Belgian and Mauritian nationality. He returned to Mauritius from Belgium on 21 February 2020. He did not show any symptoms of the coronavirus upon his arrival. On 14 March 2020, he started to have fever and cough and was transferred to Victoria Hospital where the tests conducted on his lungs did not reveal anything suspicious. He showed no signs of fever, with a body temperature of 36.6 °C, and did not show any respiratory issues. The patient had diabetes. On 16 March 2020, the test did not show that he was infected by the coronavirus and he was put into isolation. On 17 March 2020, the second test was also negative, and on the same day, he started to have respiratory issues. The results of the third test showed that the patient was infected by the coronavirus. The patient died on 19 March 2020.
- The second patient was a 59-year-old man who had both British and Mauritian nationality. He came to attend the funeral of his brother in Mauritius on 7 March 2020 and had no symptoms upon arrival. At first, he visited a private doctor without revealing his travel history. It was when he was not feeling well that he went to a private clinic and revealed that he came from abroad. His health deteriorated and he was transferred to Victoria Hospital (Candos). He was then transported to Souillac Hospital. Following tests carried out on him, which turned out to be positive, he was placed in isolation at Souillac Hospital. The patient was called patient zero by the press as he was the first person who was tested positive of the Coronavirus on the island. On 22 March he died.
- The third patient was a 21-year-old man who worked on a cruise ship. He came to Mauritius on 14 March 2020 and was placed under quarantine. He was later placed in isolation at Souillac Hospital.
- The fourth patient was a 25-year-old man who worked on a cruise ship. He came to Mauritius on 18 March 2020 and was placed under quarantine. He was later placed in isolation at Souillac Hospital.
- On 19 March 2020, the Prime Minister announced that four new cases were confirmed. The country reported its first death from coronavirus. The first 52-year-old patient died.
- Five new cases appeared in the country on 20 March 2020, raising the total number of cases to 12. The five patients are the relatives of the second patient, they consist of three women aged 15, 40 and 56, and two men aged 52 and 67.
- On 21 March 2020, the Ministry of Health confirmed that the number of cases rose to 14, of which nine cases were related to the second patient. One of the confirmed case of that day was a tourist from France, who isolated himself for two days while he was not feeling well and was treated for respiratory infection in a clinic in the north of the island. On the same day, it was reported that among the first cases reported in Madagascar, one came from Mauritius and a second person from France transited through Mauritius before reaching Madagascar.
- On 22 March 2020, 10 new cases were confirmed. The second patient, aged 59, also died. It is estimated that he contaminated nine of his relatives and one doctor. On the same day, four new cases were confirmed. The new cases confirmed on that day included four employees of a cruise ship, four who were related to the second patient, one traveler from Mumbai who reached Mauritius on 21 March 2020 and one who was a dentist.
- On 23 March 2020, eight new cases were confirmed.
- On 26 March 2020, a huge spike of cases was reported, jumping from 48 to 81 cases in a single day. On that day, a 20-year-old girl was tested positive. It has been claimed that she contracted the virus during a visit to a supermarket.
- On 27 March 2020, 13 new cases were reported, bringing the total to 43 imported cases and 51 locally transmitted. The total number of cases reached 94, including 57 men and 43 women.
- On 28 March 2020, according to Dr Vasant Rao Gujadhur who is the director of Health Services, eight new cases were confirmed, all of whom men aged between 40 and 86. On that day, Mauritius had 102 confirmed cases, including two deaths. Forty-four were imported cases and 58 were locally transmitted. Seven hundred and fifty-six contact tracing tests were completed, 60 of them was tested positive. It was reported that three medical personnel tested positive for the coronavirus in addition to four cases.
- On 29 March 2020, a man aged 76 was admitted to hospital and died the same night. It has been reported that it was an imported case, the man having arrived from Pakistan on 17 March. Five new cases were confirmed, four of whom were detected through contact tracing.
- On 30 March 2020, the Prime Minister Pravind Jugnauth confirmed that his test for coronavirus was negative. One of the confirmed cases on that day was an officer of the Passport and Immigration Office. He had arrived from Egypt one week earlier, was not placed under quarantine upon his arrival and had contact with several of his colleagues.
- On 31 March 2020, two men aged 69 and 71 years old died, bringing the death toll to 5. The total number of patients having tested positive was 143.
- As at 1 April 2020, 1426 "contact tracing tests" were completed. Among the infected people, 10 were under the age of 20, 59 people were between 49 and 59 and 26 were 60 years old or above. On that day, the 20 years old patient died, her family were unable to attend her funeral as they were also infected. It was reported that the family had to view her funeral through WhatsApp.
- As at 2 April 2020, 1 703 people were under quarantine in different centers and hotels around the island. Dr Vasantrao Gujadhur announced that eight children aged four months, two years, four, five, nine, 10, 12 and 15 were confirmed cases. On that day, a man aged 59 also died.
- On 3 April 2020, the number of cases reached 186, 82 of which were imported cases and 104 locally transmitted. It was also confirmed that seven medical personnel were infected as at 3 April 2020.
- On 4 April 2020, the Prime Minister announced 10 new cases, and that seven patients were on the path to recovery; a second test will be conducted to confirm their recovery.
- On 5 April 2020, it was reported that 31 new cases were confirmed. Two patients were on artificial respirators. The total was 227, with 102 imported cases and 125 locally transmitted: 142 were men and 85 were women. There were 1,689 people under quarantine in 27 centers around the island. It was reported that 17 police officers including 12 officers of the Passport and Immigration Office were infected.
- On 6 April 2020, 17 new cases and the first four recoveries were confirmed. As at that date, the country had 244 positive cases, 133 through local transmission. Of these 133 cases, 94 were identified through contact tracing, and the remaining 39 were travellers who came from abroad but were not in quarantine as they did not show any symptoms related to COVID-19 on arrival. They developed the symptoms later and contributed to the local transmission.
- On 9 April 2020, 41 new cases and 12 recoveries were confirmed. The minister of health had to put himself under isolation as one of his secretaries tested positive for COVID-19.
- On 10 April 2020, four new cases and two deaths were reported. The members of the High Level Committee on COVID-19, including the Prime Minister Pravind Jugnauth, and those of the National Communication Committee started to self-isolate as they were in contact with the Minister of Health whose secretary was tested positive to the coronavirus. It was also reported that the second test made on the Director of Public Health Dr Vasantrao Gujadhur was negative, he isolated himself after one member of his contact tracing team was tested positive of the coronavirus. Eight staffs of the Ministry of Health were also tested positive of the coronavirus. 216 people who were under isolation and quarantined in Rodrigues island were tested negative of the coronavirus, they were allowed to return home.
- One additional case was confirmed during the night of Friday 10 April. Five recoveries and no new cases were reported on 11 April 2020.
- On 14 April 2020, no new cases were reported, the total number of cases was 324, including 51 recoveries and 9 death. The number of active cases was 261, three patients who were tested positive of the COVID-19 went back to their countries.
- On 15 April 2020, no new cases were reported, the total number of cases was 324, including 65 recoveries and 9 deaths. The number of active cases was 247. Three patients who recovered from the coronavirus agreed to donate their blood through Plasmapheresis.
- On 18 April 2020, one case was confirmed, 72 people had recovered.
- On 27 April 2020, one doctor died. Dr Bruno Cheong was tested positive of the coronavirus after he was infected by the first patient detected on the island. At first, the patient did not reveal his travel history to the doctor. After the patient was tested positive of the coronavirus, the health authorities started contact tracing and Dr Bruno Cheong was tested positive on 23 March 2020. The Minister of Health reported that Dr Bruno Cheong died due to multiple organ failure.
- In April there were 189 new positive tests, bringing the total number of confirmed cases to 332. The death toll rose to 10. The number of active cases at the end of the month was 12.
- On 24 May 2020, two new cases of COVID-19 was registered in Mauritius. The two patients were repatriated from India on 10 May 2020. They have been in quarantine since they reached Mauritius and were transferred to the ENT Hospital in Vacoas.
- During May there were 3 new positive tests, bringing the total number of confirmed cases to 335. The death toll remained unchanged. The number of active cases at the end of the month decreased to 3.
- There were 527 confirmed cases in 2020. Ten persons died. At the end of 2020 there were 21 active cases.
- There were 22,966 confirmed cases in 2021, bringing the total number of cases to 23,493. 776 persons died, bringing the total death toll to 786. At the end of 2021 there were 813 active cases.
- There were 17,992 confirmed cases in 2022, bringing the total number of cases to 41,485. 255 persons died, bringing the total death toll to 1041. At the end of 2022 there were 55 active cases.
- There were 1,540 confirmed cases in 2023, bringing the total number of cases to 43,025. Ten persons died, bringing the total death toll to 1051.

=== Charts ===
==== New cases per day ====
View source data.

==== Deaths per day ====
View source data.

== Mauritians infected abroad ==
- A Mauritian woman, who works in Seychelles, has tested positive for COVID-19. According to reports, the woman contracted the virus through her spouse, who is a Ukrainian national. The couple work in a hotel. According to information communicated to the press by the Seychelles Commissioner for Public Health, the Ukrainian, who was on a trip, returned to Seychelles on 12 March 2020. It was then that he allegedly infected his spouse.
- It was reported that three Mauritians died from the coronavirus in France, including a 70-year-old doctor, who died on 22 March 2020, a second person aged 83, who died on 29 March and a third person aged 73 years old, who died on 31 March 2020.
- It was reported that one Mauritian national was tested positive for the coronavirus in Ethiopia.
- On 5 April 2020, the Minister of Foreign Affairs, Nando Bodha reported that 46 Mauritians who work on the cruise ship Costa Luminosa were unable to land in Marseille, because the French authorities did not authorize disembarkation. They were then directed to Savona, Italy, where it was established that six of them were infected. The latter underwent treatments in health centers. The remaining 40 were taken to Rome and placed in a quarantined hotel.
- On 10 April 2020, it was reported that a Mauritian doctor was tested positive in Switzerland.

Confirmed cases of Mauritian nationals abroad
Country/Region	Confirmed cases
Costa Luminosa	6
France	3
Seychelles	1
Ethiopia	1
Switzerland	1
Total	12

== Response ==
=== Closure of educational institutions ===
- On 18 March 2020, amidst a surge in fresh cases being confirmed in Mauritius, the Government of Mauritius announced that all schools and universities would be shut until further notice. Education programs were provided to all students online and on the television through the Mauritius Broadcasting Corporation.
- In May 2020, the government approved the distribution of 2,500 tablet computers to children who are on the social security register.

=== Panic buying ===
Since the outbreak of the virus in various countries around the world, the images of empty shelves of shops in Europe started to create panic among Mauritians. Some people started to buy food and medical products in excess.

=== Legal ===
- On 19 March 2020, the following notices, order and regulations were published in the Government Gazette:

- The Ministry of Health was of the view that Mauritius appeared to be threatened with, or infected by the coronavirus and notice was given that sections 79 to 83 of the Public Health Act shall apply to Mauritius;
- The Quarantine (Quarantinable Diseases) Regulations 2020 were published.
- The Ministry of Health gave order under sections 79 to 83 of the Public Health Act to prohibit the conveyance, excluding any conveyance transporting goods, from entering the territory of Mauritius as from 10:00 am on 19 March 2020 for a period of 15 days under Regulation 3 of The Quarantine (Quarantinable Diseases) Regulations 2020.
- The Ministry of Health gave an order under Regulation 5 of The Quarantine (Quarantinable Diseases) Regulations 2020, prohibiting any passenger, excluding crew members, from boarding or disembarking from a conveyance as from 10:00 am on 19 March 2020 for a period of 15 days.

- The Prevention and Mitigation of Infectious Disease (Coronavirus) Regulations 2020 were published in the Government Gazette on 20 March 2020. Any person who contravenes the regulations shall, on conviction, be liable to a fine not exceeding MUR 500 and to imprisonment for a term not exceeding six months. The regulation was amended on 22 March 2020.
- On 22 March 2020, the Curfew Order (General Notice No.512 of 2020) was issued by the Government of Mauritius, aimed at mitigating the spread of COVID-19 in Mauritius. The Curfew Order became effective as at 23 March 2020 at 20:00 hrs local time. Any person who contravenes the Curfew Order, shall on conviction, be liable to a fine not exceeding MUR 500 and to imprisonment for a term not exceeding 6 months. On 30 March 2020, the Curfew Order was extended until 15 April 2020 at 20:00 hrs local time.
- On 16 May 2020, the COVID-19 (Miscellaneous Provisions) Bill and the Quarantine Bill were passed in the National Assembly. The COVID-19 (Miscellaneous Provisions) Bill aims at empowering the economy, save enterprises and jobs, and build for a recovery over time. The objectives of the Quarantine Bill are to prevent the resurgence of COVID-19 infection, and step up the preparedness and response of the country to any future pandemic. Any person who contravenes the Quarantine Act, shall on conviction, be liable to a fine not exceeding MUR 500,000 and to imprisonment for a term not exceeding 5 years. The two bills were heavily criticized by some Mauritians.
- The Prevention of Resurgence and Further Spread of Epidemic Disease (COVID-19) Regulations 2020 was published in the Government Gazette on 17 May 2020. As per the regulation, any person who does not wear protective mask and respect social and physical distancing rule shall commit an offence and shall, on conviction, be liable to a fine not exceeding 50,000 rupees and to imprisonment for a term not exceeding 2 years.

=== Travel and entry restrictions ===
- On 18 March 2020, the Mauritian Prime Minister announced that all passengers, including Mauritians and foreigners, would be prohibited from entering Mauritian territory for the next 15 days, which started at 6:00 GMT (10:10 am Mauritian time). Passengers wishing to leave Mauritius would be allowed to leave. Cargo airplanes and ships would also be allowed to enter the country. Some Mauritians who were stranded in different airports around the world were allowed to enter Mauritian territory on 22 March 2020. They were required to spend 14 days in isolation at different premises provided by the government. As at 2 April 2020, it was reported that 1,000 Mauritians were able to reach the island, while 1,721 Mauritians in more than 40 countries were stranded abroad and 615 Mauritians who live abroad expressed their wish to return. On 5 April 2020, the Minister of Foreign Affairs reported that more than 3,000 Mauritians were stranded abroad.

=== Economic ===
- On 10 March 2020, the Monetary Policy Committee of the Bank of Mauritius reduced the Key Repo Rate (KRR) by 50 basis points to 2.85 per cent per annum. The decision was mainly prompted by the will to stimulate domestic economic activity.
- On 13 March 2020, the Ministry of Finance introduced several measures to assist companies with financial difficulties. The Bank of Mauritius introduced a support programme consisting of five key measures to assist Mauritian businesses across all economic sectors. The measures included:

- Special Relief amount of MUR 5 billion through commercial banks to meet cash flow and working capital requirements of economic operators directly impacted by Covid-19;
- The Bank of Mauritius reduced the Cash Reserve Ratio applicable to commercial banks from 9% to 8%. This reduction is a key measure that aims at supporting banks to further assist businesses which are being directly impacted by Covid-19;
- Commercial banks will provide a moratorium of six months on capital repayment for existing loans for economic operators that are being affected by Covid-19;
- The Bank of Mauritius has put on hold the Guideline on Credit Impairment Measurement and Income Recognition, which has been in effect since January 2020. This decision was taken to allow commercial banks to continue supporting enterprises facing cash flow and working capital difficulties in the context of Covid-19; and
- The Bank of Mauritius introduced a 2.5% Two-Year Bank of Mauritius 2020 Savings Bond for an amount of MUR 5.0 Billion from 23 March 2020. The Bond will be issued at par in multiples of MUR 25,000 to individuals who are residents of Mauritius and up to a maximum cumulative investment amount of MUR 1,000,000 per investor, whether singly or jointly, and to locally registered Non-Governmental Organisations running on a non-profit making basis for the same maximum investment amount of MUR 1,000,000.

- On 22 March 2020, the Government of Mauritius announced the Wage Assistance Scheme to ensure that all employees in the private sector are duly paid their salary for the month of March 2020. The scheme concerns both Mauritians and foreign employees working in Mauritius. Every business in the private sector, in respect of the month of March 2020, will be entitled to receive an amount equivalent to the 15 days' basic wage bill for all of its employees drawing a monthly basic wage of up to MUR 50,000 subject to a cap of MUR 12,500 of assistance per employee.
- Further to its Support Programme on 13 March 2020, the Bank of Mauritius announced additional measures on 23 March 2020 to support households and businesses impacted financially by COVID-19, and to ensure that the domestic rupee and foreign exchange markets continue to operate smoothly. These measures are as follows:

- Mauritian households impacted by Covid-19 may request their commercial banks for a moratorium of six months on capital repayments on their existing household loans as from 1 April 2020. In addition, for households earning a combined monthly basic salary of up to MUR 50,000 the Bank of Mauritius will bear the interest payable for the period 1 April 2020 to 30 June 2020 on their outstanding household loans with commercial banks;
- The Bank of Mauritius introduced a Special Foreign Currency (USD) Line of Credit targeting operators having foreign currency earnings, including SMEs. This line of credit shall be for an amount of USD 300 million, to be made available through commercial banks. Funds will be made available to commercial banks at six-month USD Libor for this facility;
- The Bank of Mauritius introduced a USD/MUR swap arrangement with commercial banks for an initial amount of USD 100 million. This arrangement would enable commercial banks to support import-oriented businesses, except for the State Trading Corporation which will be dealing directly with the Bank of Mauritius for its foreign currency requirements; and
- During the national confinement period, fees applicable on shared ATM services were waived to enable customers to have access to the ATM of any bank regardless of the issuer of the card.

- On 31 March 2020, the Government implemented a Self-Employed Assistance Scheme (SEAS) through the Mauritius Revenue Authority (MRA) to assist self-employed persons who have suffered a loss of revenue as a consequence of the lockdown in the fight against COVID-19. Additional financial support was also provided to Micro, Small and Medium Enterprises.
- To encourage public and enterprises to contribute to the COVID-19 Solidarity Fund, on 1 April 2020, the Ministry of Finance announced that he will allow them to deduct the amount donated/contributed from their taxable income.

=== Doctors ===
- Mauritians were advised not to visit hospitals for minor issues. In this respect, volunteer Mauritian doctors set up a consultation service online named "medicine.mu" to give free medical opinions and advice.

=== Sports ===
On 6 April 2020, Mauritius became the first country to order the termination of all football leagues in the country for the 2019–2020 season.

== Economic impact ==
- It is estimated that the shutdowns implemented to control the pandemic costs the Mauritian economy between Rs 1 billion and Rs 1.3 billion a day. Resulting in a total estimated cost of Rs 15-20 billion or 4% of the country's GDP for the full 15 day lock-down announced by government on 20 March. On 30 March 2020, the sanitary curfew which started on 23 March at 20 00 hours was extended for two weeks up to 15 April 2020. The lockdown was extended to Monday 4 May 2020, to further contain the spread of the COVID-19 in the country.
- On 22 April, the board of Air Mauritius took the decision to place the Company under voluntary administration after coronavirus-related disruptions made it impossible for the airline to meet its financial obligations for the foreseeable future. The pandemic had a major impact on the revenue of the company while it was seeking to change its business model to address existing financial problems.

== See also ==
- COVID-19 pandemic
- COVID-19 pandemic by country and territory
- COVID-19 pandemic in Africa
