= Taxation in Armenia =

Taxation in Armenia is regulated by the State Revenue Committee, which is the tax authority of the Armenian government. Meanwhile, the Armenian Tax Service is responsible for the collection of taxes, providing revenue services, preventing tax fraud and tax evasion, and implementing various tax reform programs in conjunction with the State Revenue Committee.

== Type of tax ==
=== Employee income tax ===
From 1 January 2020, Armenia switched to a flat income taxation system, which, regardless of the amount, will tax wages at 23%. Moreover, until 2023 the taxation rate will gradually decrease from 23% to 20%.

=== Corporate income tax ===
Reforms adopted in June 2019, aims to boost medium-term economic activity and to increase tax compliance. Among other measures, the corporate income tax was reduced by two percentage points to 18.0 per cent and the tax on dividends for non-resident organizations halved to 5.0 per cent.

=== Special taxation for small business ===
From 1 January 2020, Armenia abandoned two alternative tax systems - self-employed and family entrepreneurship. They have been replaced by micro-entrepreneurship with a non-taxable threshold of up to 24 million drams. Business entities that carry out specialized activities, in particular, accounting, advocacy, and consulting will not be considered as micro-business entities. Micro business are exempted from all types of taxes other than income tax, which will be 5 thousand drams per employee.

=== Value-added tax ===
Over half of tax revenues collected between the January–August 2008 time period were generated from value-added taxes (VAT) of 20%. By comparison, corporate profit tax generated less than 16 percent of the revenues. This suggests that tax collection in Armenia is improving at the expense of ordinary citizens, rather than wealthy citizens (who have been the main beneficiaries of Armenia's double-digit economic growth in recent years).

== See also ==
- Economy of Armenia
- International taxation
- List of countries by tax rates
- List of countries by tax revenue as percentage of GDP
- Ministry of Finance (Armenia)
- Tax rates of Europe
