= Felix Tambula =

Malawian lawyer and revenue authority executive

Felix Tambulasi
- Occupations: Lawyer, business executive
- Years active: 2000–present
- Employer: Malawi Revenue Authority
- Known for: Corporate legal practice; public finance administration
- Office: Commissioner General of the Malawi Revenue Authority
- Predecessor: Dan Daka

Felix Tambulasi is a Malawian lawyer and business executive. He serves as Commissioner General of the Malawi Revenue Authority (MRA). Tambulasi previously gained public attention following High Court orders that froze about K2.2 billion Malawi kwacha under investigation as suspected proceeds of crime.

== Career ==
Tambulasi is a practicing lawyer at Robert Lexis Attorneys based in Blantyre. He has previously worked at the Malawi Revenue Authority as Director of Legal Services and Company Secretary.

He has also been engaged in high-profile corporate representation in legal and business fields in Malawi.

=== MRA Commissioner General ===
Tambulasi was appointed Commissioner General of the Malawi Revenue Authority by the government in 2025, taking over from Dan Daka. His mandate at MRA includes strengthening tax administration, addressing revenue leakages, and improving operational efficiency at the tax agency.

== Legal and financial scrutiny ==
In 2023, the Financial Division of the High Court ordered the freezing of nearly K2.2 billion belonging to Tambulasi under a civil process related to suspected proceeds of crime. He was listed as a defendant in connection with funds linked to South African national Willem Willie Steenkamp, known in Malawi as William Bilderberg, who faced allegations of money laundering and forgery. Tambulasi has been ordered to explain the source of the frozen funds through the court process.

== See also ==
- Malawi Revenue Authority
