= Taxation in Lithuania =

Taxes in Lithuania are levied by the central and the local governments. Most important revenue sources include the value added tax, personal income tax, excise tax and corporate income tax, which are all applied on the central level. In addition, social security contributions are collected in a social security fund, outside the national budget. Taxes in Lithuania are administered by the State Tax Inspectorate, the Customs Department and the State Social Insurance Fund Board. In 2019, the total government revenue in Lithuania was 30.3% of GDP.

Main tax types by amount collected, 2023.
1. Value added tax (37.5%)
2. Personal income tax (36.1%)
3. Excise taxes (11.0%)
4. Corporate income tax (10.9%)
5. Tariffs (0.76%)
6. Other taxes (3.73%)

== History of taxation in Lithuania ==
Before the 16th century, finances in the Grand Duchy of Lithuania were based on barter. The first taxes (duoklė ("tribute"), dėkla (grain and hay trubite) and mezliava) were paid in farm products. The first cash taxes were introduced during the reign of Kęstutis, although most taxes were still paid in goods (e.g., wheat, cattle, horses).

In the Polish–Lithuanian Commonwealth, a treasury court was established in 1591, followed by the treasury tribunal in 1613 that presided over tax cases until 1764. The taxes were set by Sejm. Taxes introduced in the 17th and 18th centuries included padūmė (tax on holdings), hiberna (tax for quartering), kvarta (tax on government estates) and pagalvė (pillow tax, payable per individual). After the partitions of the Polish–Lithuanian Commonwealth the taxation system in Lithuania was subordinated to the respective partitioning powers. Taxes collected during this period were mostly on land, rents, trade and manufacture.

Taxes were again collected by the newly independent Lithuanian state after 1918. The Law on Taxes was introduced on 23 January 1919, followed by a number of additional tax laws. Taxes introduced included direct taxes (e.g., land tax, real estate tax, business tax, inheritance tax) and indirect taxes (e.g., excise taxes on drinks, tobacco, precious metals, as well as tariffs).

During the Soviet occupation, the Lithuanian financial system, including taxes, was integrated into the Soviet one. The personal income tax was progressive and ranged from 0.35 to 13 percent on income above the non-taxable amount. Local taxes were also collected: house and land ownership tax, as well as vehicle ownership tax.

The modern tax system in Lithuania was gradually reestablished in the early 1990s with the introduction of corporate income and personal income taxes in 1990, land tax in 1992 and the Law on Tax Administration in 1995, amongst a lot of other tax related legislation.

== Modern tax system ==
The modern tax system in Lithuania is based on the Constitution of Lithuania. Articles 65 and 127 of the constitution enshrine two key tenets of the tax system: taxes can only be introduced by law and only Seimas can introduce tax laws. Key tax laws in Lithuania include Law on Tax Administration, Law on Customs and the individual laws for specific taxes. The tax practice is also affected by international treaties, including numerous bilateral tax treaties for the Avoidance of Double Taxation to which Lithuania is part. As part of the European Union, taxation system in Lithuania is also heavily affected by European rules and regulations, particularly in the areas of VAT and tariffs.

The main principles of tax administration in Lithuania, as defined by law, are:

- Equality – all tax payers shall be treated equally before law.
- Fairness – the tax administrator has to calculate the tax due in a fair manner.
- Universal applicability – all tax payers have to pay taxes in accordance with law and in a timely manner.
- Clarity – tax obligations and the process for settling tax obligations has to be clearly and unambiguously defined by law and associated rules.
- Substance over form – transactions and relations shall be assessed on their actual content and not on their formal expression.

Tax revenue in the Lithuanian national budget by type of tax, 2020

Most taxes in Lithuania are administered by the State Tax Inspectorate, except social security and health insurance taxes which are administered by the State Social Insurance Fund Board and tariffs which are administered by the Customs Department. The Customs also administer the part of value added tax and excise duties where they relate to goods imported and exported. Some tax administration functions are also performed by the Ministry of Environment Protection and the Ministry of Agriculture.

The most important taxes collected in Lithuania include the personal income tax, corporate income (profit) tax, value added tax and excise tax which together accounted for 96.7% of tax revenue or 78.4% of total revenue in the national budget (including municipal budgets) in 2020. All of these taxes are collected in the state budget, although a part of the personal income taxes collected from individuals are allocated to the municipality where that individual resides. The rules for this allocation are approved annually. Taxes on property are allocated fully to municipal budgets.

In 2019, the total government revenue in Lithuania was 30.3% of GDP. Such ratio is slightly below the OECD average of 33.8%, but higher than that of several other developed economies such as USA, Australia and Switzerland.

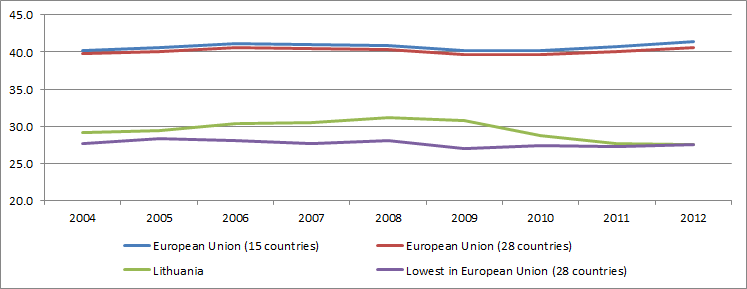
Total receipts from taxes and social contributions as % of GDP

== Taxes levied ==
=== Personal income tax ===
Personal income tax (Lithuanian: Gyventojų pajamų mokestis or GPM) is levied on residents and certain non-residents. Residents are taxed on their worldwide income, including income from employment, self-employment, investment income and capital gains. Non-residents may be taxed on certain types of income deemed to originate in Lithuania, including employment income, interest, income from distributed profit and income arising from real estate or other property. Relief from double taxation is available in some cases.

There is an income tax threshold (Lithuanian: Neapmokestinamasis pajamų dydis or NPD). Basic tax rate for income from employment is 20% and the higher rate is 32%. Income from dividends is taxed at a rate of 15%. Tax rate varies for other types of income. Thresholds are adjusted annually based on the national average wage and overall rates may also depend on personal circumstances (number of children, disability reliefs, etc).

=== Social security contributions ===
Contributions to the social security fund are due on income from employment. They are paid to the State Social Insurance Fund Board (Lithuanian: Valstybinio socialinio draudimo fondo valdyba or Sodra) and are colloquially known as the Sodra taxes (Lithuanian: Sodros mokesčiai). They consist of two main taxes: state social insurance (Lithuanian: Valstybinis socialinis draudimas or VSD) and compulsory healthcare insurance (Lithuanian: Privalomasis sveikatos draudimas or PSD). Generally, all residing citizens and permanent residents are required to pay the compulsory healthcare insurance (PSD) contributions.

As of 2021, employee contributions are withheld from the salary at a rate of 19.5%-22.5%, depending on the chosen contributions to different pillars of the pension funds. This includes 6.98% tax rate of the compulsory healthcare insurance (PSD). The employer contributions are usually 1.77%, but may vary (0.14%-2.49%) depending on the type of employment, industry, activity type, etc. Individuals other than employees, including the self-employed, sport persons, artists and farmers, may be subject to social security contributions at different rates. Social security contributions have a "ceiling" (Lithuanian: Sodros įmokų lubos) i.e. a threshold after which the contributions are not deducted.

In general, income tax and the social security contributions might take about 40% of the gross salary.

=== Corporate income tax ===
Corporate income tax (Lithuanian: Pelno mokestis, literally profit tax) is levied on Lithuanian companies, companies operating in Lithuania through a permanent establishment, and non-resident companies. Lithuanian companies are taxed on their worldwide income, allowing for deduction for income generated through permanent establishments in other countries in accordance with international treaties. Companies operating in Lithuania through a permanent establishment are taxed on the profit attributed to such permanent establishment. Non-resident companies are taxed on certain income that is considered to originate in Lithuania, such as dividends, interest and royalties, although exceptions exist.

Most companies are taxed at a rate of 16%. The rate of 6% is applied for small companies and agricultural enterprises, as defined by law. Startups enjoy the rate of 0% for the first fiscal year (if income does not exceed 300 000 EUR). The rate of 10% is applied on the interest and royalty income paid to non-resident companies. Non-profit organisations, social enterprises, businesses engaged in shipping or some other activities may be taxed on a different basis. Participation exemption applies to dividend paid/received from closely held companies and capital gains from shares of closely held companies, as defined by law.

=== Value added tax ===
Standard VAT rates in Lithuania
VAT Rate	As of
18%	1/05/1994
19%	1/01/2009
21%	1/09/2009

The value added tax (Lithuanian: Pridėtinės vertės mokestis or PVM) is levied on goods and services that are subject to VAT according to law. The VAT in Lithuania is part of the European Union value added tax system.

The standard VAT rate in Lithuania is 21%. Certain goods and services are subject to reduced VAT rates of 9% (e.g., most books, periodicals and passenger transportation services), 5% (e.g., medicines, medical equipment, equipment for disabled, etc) and 0% (e.g., international transportation). Certain goods and services are exempt from VAT (e.g., financial services).

=== Excise tax ===
Excise taxes (Lithuanian: Akcizo mokesčiai) in Lithuania are applied on imported or locally manufactured and sold products:

- Alcoholic beverages and intermediate alcohol products
- Tobacco products
- Energy products, including vehicle fuel, heating fuel and electricity

Excise tax rates are set by law and have changed frequently, driven by the minimum tax rates required by European Union, as well as local budgetary and public interest considerations, as the tax contributes significantly to the national budget, while many of the products taxed (i.e., alcohol and tobacco products) have negative effects on public health.

As of 2015, the excise tax rates on tobacco products were due to meet the minimum rates required by the European Union by 2018. The relatively low rates in Lithuania are mostly driven by the presence of a significant black market for cigarettes, which are illegally imported from Russia and Belarus.

At the same time, the excise taxes on alcohol products are substantially higher than the minimum levels required by European Union, exceeding them already in 2004, especially for spirits. The increases have been driven by budgetary and public health considerations (alcohol consumption in Lithuania is among the highest in Europe), but have attracted criticism for contributing to the widespread black market. Beer, on the other hand, is relatively mildly taxed compared to other European countries.

The black market for goods subject to excise tax has been cited as the main reason for the excise taxes in Lithuania failing to meet either budgetary or public health goals. The black market benefits from close proximity to Russia and Belarus, widespread tolerance among the population and the prices of legally available goods being high relative to income. Black market sales are estimated to constitute 33% of all sales for spirits (although only 4–5% for low-alcohol beverages that enjoy lower excise tax rates), 35% for cigarettes and 15 to 20% for vehicle fuel. Therefore, further increasing excise taxes beyond the minimum level set by European Union has been criticized as counter-productive.

=== Other taxes ===
The Law on Tax Administration sets the list of 25 taxes (as of 2015) levied in Lithuania. Other than the taxes outlined above, they include taxes on real estate and land, natural resources, pollution, inheritance, lotteries and gambling, as well as fees for services provided by the government (e.g., registration of industrial property) and certain taxes in the sugar industry.
