= Armenian Tax Service =

Armenian government department

Armenian Tax Service logo

The Armenian Tax Service (Armenian: Հայաստանի հարկային ծառայություն, romanized: Hayastani harkayin tsarrayut’yun) is a subsidiary department of the State Revenue Committee responsible for tax and revenue services on behalf of the Armenian government, headquartered in Yerevan.

== History ==
The Armenian Tax Service is the authoritative body which regulates taxation services in Armenia. The department is responsible for the collection of taxes (including income tax and corporate tax), preventing of tax violations and tax evasion, training tax officers, and implementing tax reform programs, including the modernizing of tax mechanisms in Armenia. The department was established on 2 October 1991. Armenia is a member of the International Monetary Fund, the Intra-European Organisation of Tax Administrations, and ratified the Convention on Mutual Administrative Assistance in Tax Matters in February 2020.

== International cooperation ==
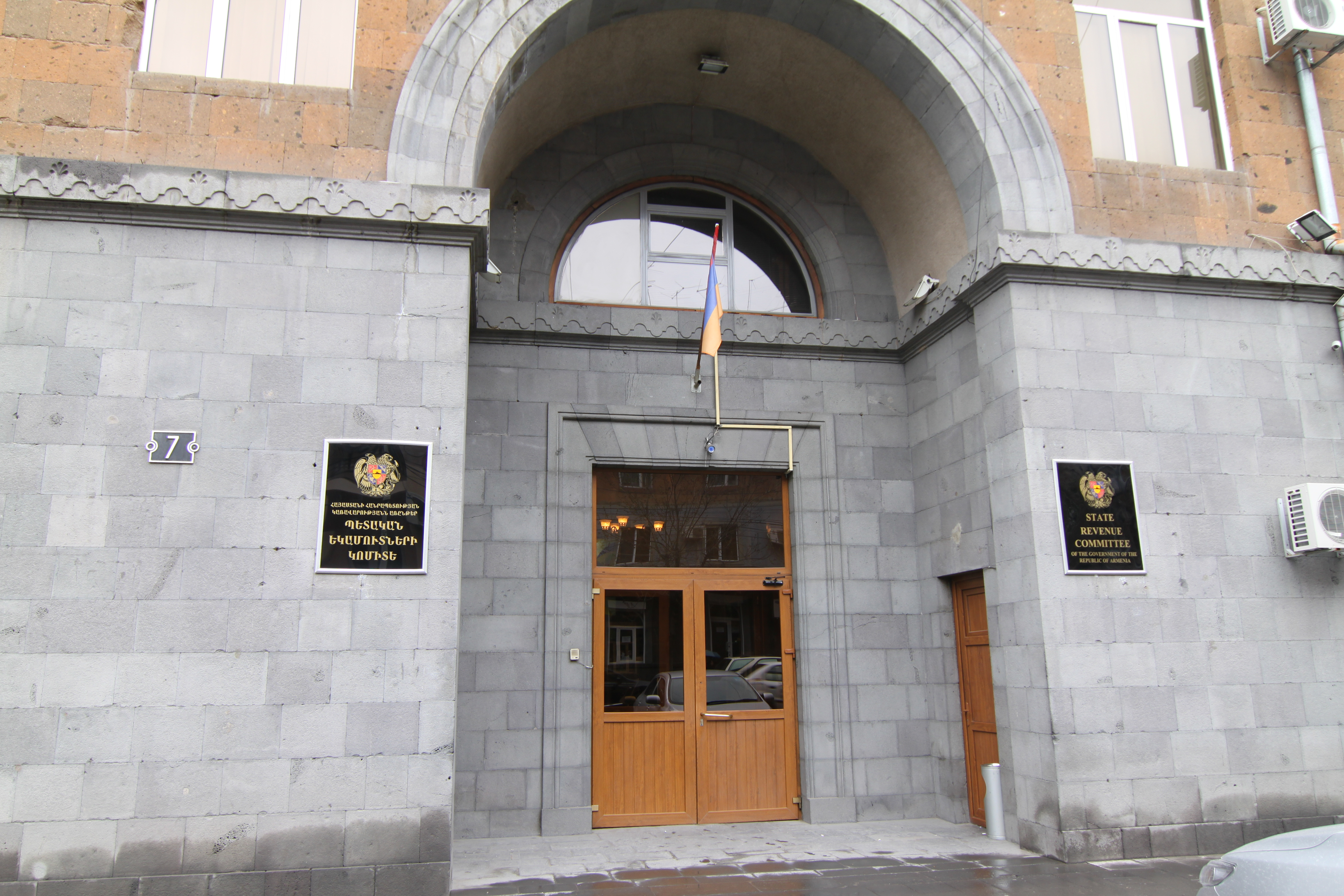
Headquarters of the State Revenue Committee (housing both the Armenian Customs Service and the Armenian Tax Service).

The Armenian Tax Service cooperates with various other taxation bodies. In November 2019, the Global Forum on Transparency and Exchange of Information for Tax Purposes held a conference in Armenia around the implementation of international taxation standards, the event was sponsored by the Asian Development Bank.

In May 2021, the department signed a memorandum of understanding with the Italian Agency of Revenue. In October 2021, the two departments held a joint meeting centered around combating tax fraud, with support and expertise from the Organisation for Economic Co-operation and Development and the United Nations Development Program.

In September 2021, the department signed a cooperation agreement with the State Revenue Service of Latvia. Also in September, the department met with members of the Federal Taxation Service of Russia, participants discussed increasing cooperation between the two bodies in the field of tax administration.

Armenia is a member of the UK's Good Governance Fund, which has provided tax code and customs reform support to the department.

The department participates in the Coordinating Council of Heads of Tax Authorities, which gathers tax authorities from members of the Commonwealth of Independent States. The council implements taxation measures envisaged by the CIS economic development strategy and exchanges data. In 2021, Armenia assumed chairmanship of the council.

As stipulated in the Armenia-EU Comprehensive and Enhanced Partnership Agreement, the European Union supports several key initiatives for economic and taxation reform in Armenia, including the modernization of tax administration and tackling fraud.

== See also ==
- Economy of Armenia
- International taxation
- List of countries by tax rates
- List of countries by tax revenue as percentage of GDP
- Ministry of Finance (Armenia)
- Taxation in Armenia
