= Ian Saunders =

Ian Saunders is an international trade and customs expert who currently serves as the secretary general of the World Customs Organization (WCO). He was elected to this position on 24 June 2023 and assumed office on 1 January 2024. As secretary general, Saunders provides leadership and executive management for the global Customs community, focusing on priorities such as developing international customs standards, facilitating global trade, protecting revenue collection, fostering customs-business partnerships, and supporting capacity-building initiatives for customs reform and modernization.

== Early life and education ==
Ian Saunders holds undergraduate and graduate degrees in international affairs from Georgetown University in Washington, D.C. He has also attended executive courses at Harvard University's Kennedy School of Government and the American University, further enhancing his expertise in international trade and policy.

== Career ==
=== U.S. Customs and Border Protection (CBP) ===
Saunders spent the majority of his career with U.S. Customs and Border Protection (CBP), where he held several senior positions. His roles included:

- Assistant Commissioner for International Affairs (April 2018 – January 2020): Oversaw international policy coordination and technical assistance programs.
- Deputy Assistant Commissioner for International Affairs (June 2016 – April 2018): Managed policy coordination and liaison with foreign border management agencies.
- Director of International Policy and Programs (August 2007 – April 2008): Led initiatives to strengthen international partnerships and programs.
- Director of International Training and Assistance Division (June 2003 – July 2007): Directed training and capacity-building programs for international customs agencies.

Saunders entered the U.S. Government Senior Executive Service in 2008, marking his ascent to high-level leadership roles within the federal government.

=== U.S. Department of Commerce ===
From January 2020 to January 2024, Saunders served as the Deputy Assistant Secretary for the Western Hemisphere at the U.S. Department of Commerce. In this role, he was responsible for developing policies, programs, and strategies to strengthen the United States' commercial position in the Western Hemisphere.

=== World Customs Organization (WCO) ===
On 24 June 2023, Ian Saunders was elected as the Secretary General of the World Customs Organization, a Brussels-based intergovernmental organization representing 185 customs administrations worldwide. He officially assumed the role on 1 January 2024. As Secretary General, Saunders is tasked with leading the WCO's efforts to modernize and harmonize global customs practices, enhance trade facilitation, and address emerging challenges in international trade and border security.
