= State Tax Inspectorate =

- Valstybinė Mokesčių Inspekcija

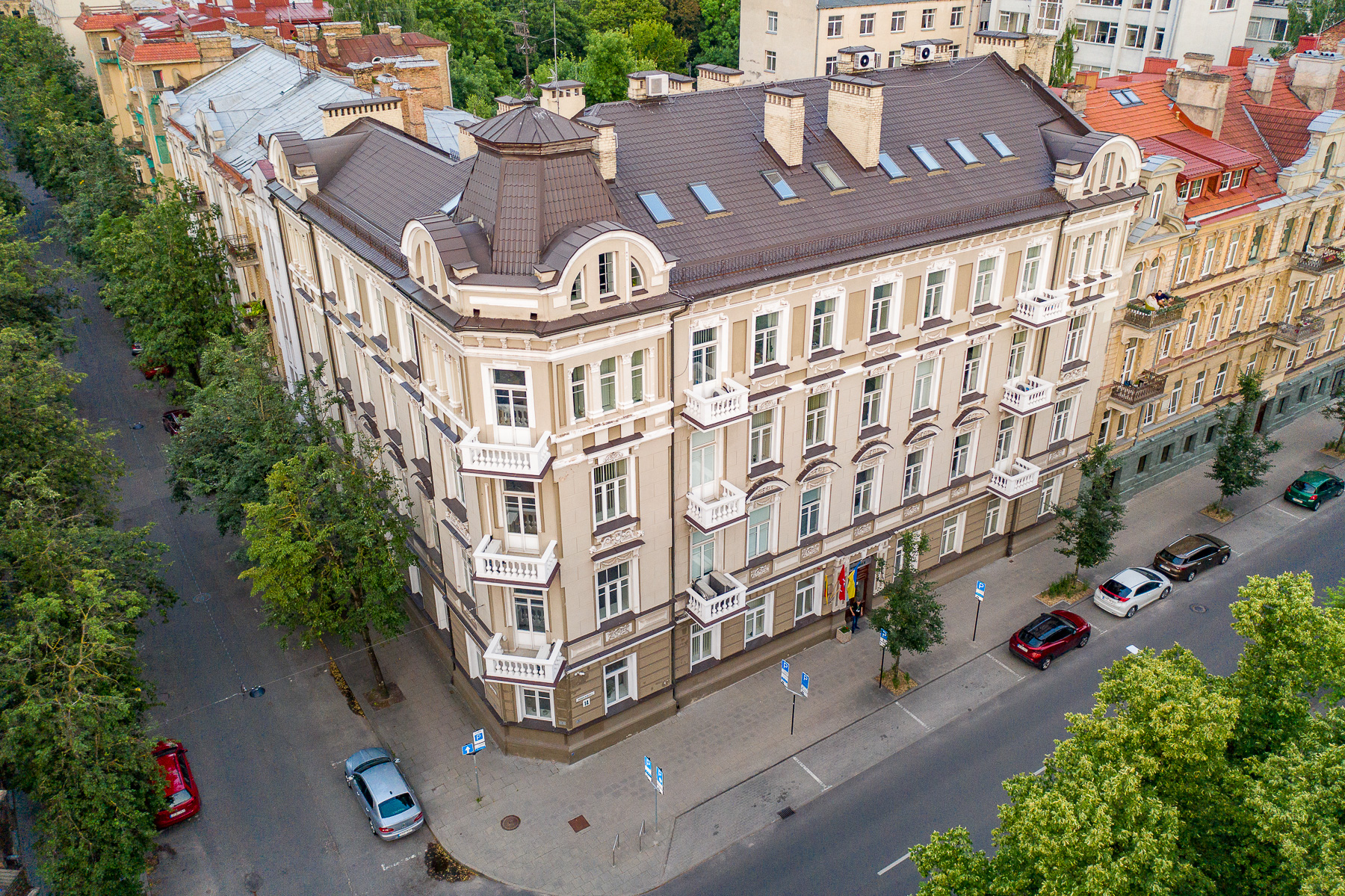
- Headquarters

Department overview
- Formed: 1 October 1995; 30 years ago
- Jurisdiction: Government of Lithuania
- Headquarters: Vasario 16-osios str. 14, 01107 Vilnius, Lithuania
- Employees: 1,323 (July, 2024)
- Department executive: Director General
- Parent Department: Ministry of Finance
- Website: vmi.lt

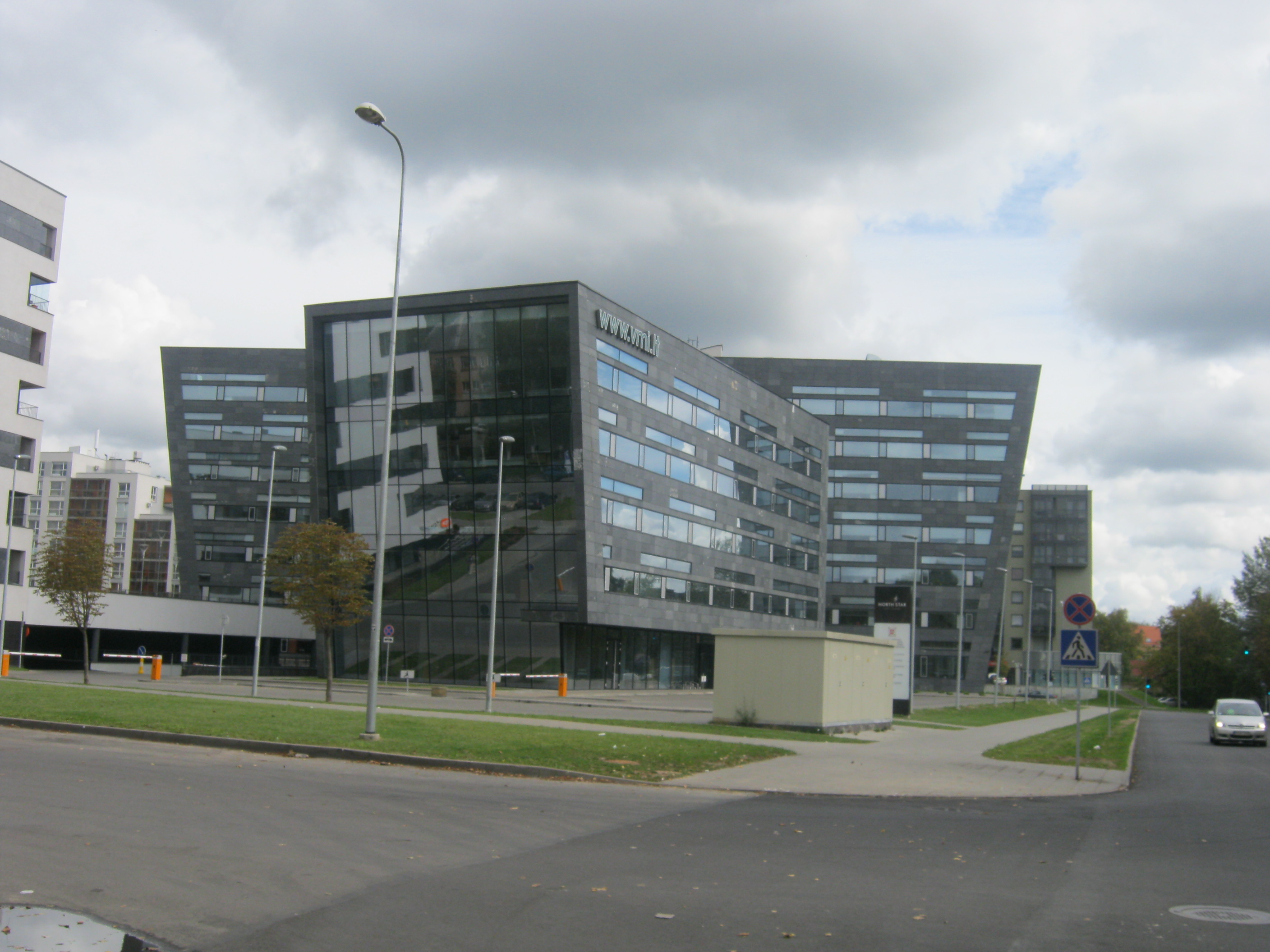
Inspectorate for Vilnius County (office in Žirmūnai, Vilnius)

The State Tax Inspectorate (VMI; Lithuanian: Valstybinė Mokesčių Inspekcija) is the tax authority in the Republic of Lithuania. It is an agency under the Ministry of Finance.

The main objectives of the agency include: helping the taxpayers with their tax obligations and rights; implementation and enforcement of tax laws, primarily collecting and administering the taxes; collection of revenue for the state budget.

== History ==
The historic origins of the tax authority in Lithuania can be traced back to the Treasury Tribunal and, later, Treasury Commission of the Grand Duchy of Lithuania which operated in 16th-18th centuries. Origins of the modern agency start in 1918 with the establishment of Finance and Tax departments within the Lithuanian Ministry of Finance. These departments were not independent institutions and the finance minister was also the Chief Tax Administrator.

The modern institution of the State Tax Inspectorate was defined in the laws in 1990. It was established as a separate legal entity in 1995. Currently, the institution and its activities are defined by the Law on Tax Administration 2004.

The State Tax Authority of Lithuania is a founding member of Intra-European Organisation of Tax Administrations since 1996.

== See also ==
- Taxation in Lithuania
- HM Revenue & Customs, the UK equivalent
