= Customs Department (Lithuania) =

Customs Department of Lithuania Lietuvos Muitinės Departamentas
- Seal of the Customs Department

Agency overview
- Formed: 8 May 1919

Jurisdictional structure
- Operations jurisdiction: Lithuania
- Specialist jurisdiction: Customs, excise, gambling

Operational structure
- Headquarters: A. Jakšto str. 1, 01105, Vilnius
- Parent agency: Ministry of Finance

Website
- lrmuitine.lt

Customs Department of Lithuania (Lithuanian: Lietuvos Muitinės Departamentas) is the customs department under the Ministry of Finance. It is a part of the customs system of the European Union.

== History ==
History of customs and tariff collection in Lithuania dates back to 11-13th centuries, when the Kingdom of Lithuania and later Grand Duchy of Lithuania began trading with the European states. Vytautas the Great centralised the customs service in early 15th century. In modern Lithuania, the customs department was first established on 8 May 1919 as the Customs Department, at that time, under the Ministry of Trade and Industry. The institution in its current form was restored on 9 October 1990.

Customs Department of Lithuania is a member of the World Customs Organization since 1992. Since Lithuania joined the EU, the department also closely cooperates with EU DG TAXUD and the European Anti-Fraud Office.

In 2024, the customs authorities of Lithuania, Latvia, Estonia, Poland and Finland have signed an agreement on uniform implementation of the EU sanctions.

== See also ==
- European Union Customs Union
- General Agreement on Tariffs and Trade
- Taxation
