= Mauritius Revenue Authority =

Mauritius Revenue Authority (MRA)
Parastatal Body overview
- Formed: 1 July 2006
- Jurisdiction: Government of Mauritius
- Headquarters: Port Louis, Mauritius
- Parastatal Body executives: Tej Kumar Gujadhur, Chairperson; Rohit Ramnawaz, Director General
- Parent department: Ministry of Finance and Economic Development
- Website: mra.mu

The Mauritius Revenue Authority (MRA) is a parastatal organisation in Mauritius, it is the Revenue Authority of the Mauritian Government and operate under the aegis of the Ministry of Finance and Economic Development. The MRA is responsible for the assessment of liability, the collection and the accountability for Tax and the management, operation and enforcement of Revenue Laws.

== Functions ==
According to Section 4, part 1 of the Mauritius Revenue Authority Act 2004, the functions of the MRA shall be to;

(a) administer, operate and give effect to the Revenue Laws and, for that purpose, assess liability to, collect and account for, all taxes;

(b) monitor, oversee and co-ordinate all activities relating to, and ensure a fair, and effective administration and operation of, the Revenue Laws;

(c) deliver a high standard of service to the public with a view to promoting voluntary compliance with the Revenue Laws, promoting fairness and transparency, increasing the efficiency and effectiveness of its Departments and Divisions and maximising revenue collection;

(d) combat fraud and other forms of tax evasion;

(e) set objectives and work targets and promote human resource development and training for its officers and other employees;

(f) determine the manner in which a particular category of persons may use electronic means for the purpose of submitting a return, effecting a payment or making a claim under a Revenue Law;

(g) ensure compliance by its officers with the Revenue Laws to the highest possible degree; and

(h) advise the Minister and other relevant organs of the State on any matter relating to taxation or revenue law or administration.

== See also ==
- Revenue service
