= International Convention on the Harmonization of Frontier Controls of Goods =

1982 UNECE treaty

The International Convention on the Harmonization of Frontier Controls of Goods is a 1982 United Nations Economic Commission for Europe (UNECE) treaty whereby states agree to co-operate in harmonizing and simplifying international border control. For goods in transit, the states that ratify the Convention agree to implement "simple and speedy treatment ... by limiting their inspections to cases where these are warranted by the actual circumstances or risks".

The Convention was developed by the Inland Transport Committee of the UNECE concluded at Geneva on 21 October 1982. It was signed by 13 states and entered into force on 15 October 1985. It is open to ratification by any state and as of 2016 has 58 parties, which includes 57 states plus the European Union. A number of states outside of UNECE have ratified the treaty.
