= Malawi Revenue Authority =

Government agency overview
- Jurisdiction: Malawi
- Headquarters: Lilongwe, Malawi
- Government agency executives: John S. Biziwick, Commissioner General; Henry Ngutwa, Deputy Commissioner General
- Website: www.mra.mw

Malawi Revenue Authority (MRA) is the revenue service and a government agency of the Malawi government. Malawi Revenue Authority is responsible for collecting taxes. The duties of the Malawi Revenue Authority include providing tax assistance to taxpayers and pursuing and resolving instances of erroneous or fraudulent tax filings.

== Revenue collection ==
Malawi Revenue Authority is responsible for assessing, collecting and accounting for revenue through the Ministry of Finance. The revenues and taxes administered by Malawi Revenue Authority include;

- Income Tax
- Pay As You Earn (PAYE)
- Value Added Tax
- Withholding taxes
- Excise duty
- Special excise duty
- Capital gains tax
- Carbon tax
- Road tolls
- Surtax
- Stamp duty
- Customs duty
- Presumptive taxes
