= Revenue service =

Type of government agency

A revenue service, revenue agency or taxation authority is a government agency responsible for the intake of government revenue, including taxes and sometimes non-tax revenue. Depending on the jurisdiction, revenue services may be charged with tax collection, investigation of tax evasion, or carrying out audits.

In certain instances, they also administer payments to certain relevant individuals (such as statutory sick pay, statutory maternity pay) as well as targeted financial support (welfare) to families and individuals (through payment of tax credits or transfer payments).

The chief executive of the revenue agency is usually styled as Commissioner, Minister, Secretary or Director.

== Revenue services by jurisdiction ==
Jurisdiction	Agency name	Notes
Albania	General Directorate of Taxation (Albanian: Drejtoria e Përgjithshme e Tatimeve)	—
Argentina	Customs Control and Collection Agency (Spanish: Agencia de Recaudación y Control Aduanero, ARCA)	—
Armenia	State Revenue Committee of Armenia (Armenian: Պետական Եկամուտների Կոմիտե (ՊԵԿ))	—
Australia	Australian Taxation Office (ATO)	—
Bangladesh	National Board of Revenue	—
Barbados	Barbados Revenue Authority (BRA)	Created on 1 April 2014 as a merger between Inland Revenue and Land Tax Departments and the Value Added Tax (VAT) & Excise Divisions of the Customs and Excise Department.
Belgium	Federal Public Service Finance (Dutch: FOD Financiën; French: SPF Finances; German: FÖD Finanzen)	—
Bosnia and Herzegovina	Indirect Taxation Authority (Bosnian/Croatian: Uprava za indirektno oporezivanje; Serbian: Управа за индиректно опорезивање)	—
Botswana	Botswana Unified Revenue Service	—
Brazil	Department of Federal Revenue of Brazil (Portuguese: Secretaria da Receita Federal do Brasil; RFB)	—
Bulgaria	National Revenue Agency	—
Canada	Canada Revenue Agency (CRA; French: Agence du revenu du Canada; ARC)	Previously the Canada Customs and Revenue Agency
Quebec	Revenue Quebec (French: Revenu Québec)	The CRA collects revenue on behalf of provincial and territorial governments except in Quebec.
Chile	Servicio de Impuestos Internos	—
China	State Taxation Administration (STA, Chinese: 国家税务总局)	—
Hong Kong	Inland Revenue Department (IRD; Chinese: 稅務局)	—
Macau	Financial Services Bureau (FSB; Chinese: 財政局; Portuguese: Direcção dos Serviços de Finanças)	—
Colombia	National Directorate of Taxes and Customs (Spanish: Dirección de Impuestos y Aduanas Nacionales; DIAN)	—
Democratic Republic of the Congo	Direction générale des impôts	—
Czech Republic	Ministry of Finance (Czech: Ministerstvo financí České republiky; MFČR)	—
Denmark	Danish Tax Agency (Danish: Skattestyrelsen)	Previously SKAT
Dominican Republic	General Directorate of Internal Taxes (Spanish: Dirección General de Impuestos Internos; DGII)	—
Ecuador	Servicio de Rentas Internas	—
Estonia	Tax and Customs Board (Estonian: Maksu- ja Tolliamet; MTA)	—
Finland	Finnish Tax Administration	—
France	General Directorate of Public Finance (French: Direction Générale des Finances Publiques; DGFIP)	—
Ghana	Ghana Revenue Authority	—
Germany	Federal Central Tax Office (German: Bundeszentralamt für Steuern; BZSt)	On a federal level (16 regional tax offices exist)
Hungary	National Tax and Customs Administration (Hungarian: Nemzeti Adó- és Vámhivatal; NAV)	Since 1 January 2011
Iceland	Directorate of Internal Revenue	—
India	Indian Revenue Service (IRS; Sanskrit: Bhāratīya Rājasva Sevā)	—
Indonesia	Directorate General of Taxes (Indonesian: Direktorat Jenderal Pajak) and Directorate General of Customs and Excise (Indonesian: Direktorat Jenderal Bea dan Cukai)	—
Ireland	Office of the Revenue Commissioners (the Revenue; Irish: Na Coimisinéirí Ioncaim)	—
Israel	Israel Tax Authority (Hebrew: רשות המסים בישראל Rashut HaMisim B'Israel)	—
Italy	Italian Agency of Revenue (Italian: Agenzia delle Entrate)	—
Jamaica	Tax Administration Jamaica	—
Japan	National Tax Agency (NTA; Japanese: 国税庁 Kokuzei-chō)	—
Kenya	Kenya Revenue Authority (KRA)	—
Latvia	State Revenue Service (Latvian: Valsts ieņēmumu dienests)	—
Lithuania	State Tax Inspectorate (Lithuanian: Valstybinė Mokesčių Inspekcija)	—
Malawi	Malawi Revenue Authority	—
Malaysia	Inland Revenue Board of Malaysia (IRBM) (Malay: Lembaga Hasil Dalam Negeri Malaysia; LHDN)	—
Mauritius	Mauritius Revenue Authority	—
Mexico	Tax Administration Service (Spanish: Servicio de Administración Tributaria; SAT)	—
Mongolia	Mongolian Tax Administration (Mongolian: Татварын Ерөнхий Газар)	—
Morocco	General Tax Directorate	—
Nigeria	Federal Inland Revenue Service	—
Nepal	Inland Revenue Department (Nepali: आन्तरिक राजश्व विभाग)	—
Netherlands	Tax and Customs Administration (Dutch: Belastingdienst)	—
New Zealand	Inland Revenue Department (IRD; Māori: Te Tari Taake)	—
Norway	Norwegian Tax Administration (Norwegian: Skatteetaten)	—
Pakistan	Federal Board of Revenue (FBR; Urdu: وفاقی آمدنی هيئت)	—
Peru	Superintendencia Nacional de Aduanas y de Administración Tributaria (Peru ) [sunat.gob.pe/]	—
Philippines	Bureau of Internal Revenue (BIR; Filipino: Kawanihan ng Rentas Internas)	—
Poland	National Revenue Administration (Polish: Krajowa Administracja Skarbowa)	—
Portugal	Portuguese Tax and Customs Authority (Portuguese: Autoridade Tributária e Aduaneira)	—
Romania	National Agency for Fiscal Administration (Romanian: Agenția Națională de Administrare Fiscală; ANAF)	—
Russia	Federal Tax Service (Russian: Федеральная налоговая служба, ФНС России)	—
Rwanda	Rwanda Revenue Authority	—
Saudi Arabia	General Authority of Zakat and Tax	—
Singapore	Inland Revenue Authority of Singapore (Chinese: 新加坡国内税务局; Malay: Lembaga Hasil Dalam Negeri Singapura)	—
Slovenia	Tax Administration of Slovenia	—
South Africa	South African Revenue Service (SARS)	—
South Korea	National Tax Service (South Korea)	—
Spain	Spanish Tax Agency (Spanish: Agencia Estatal de Administración Tributaria; AEAT)	—
Sweden	Swedish Tax Agency (Swedish: Skatteverket)	—
Tanzania	Tanzania Revenue Authority (TRA)	—
Thailand	The Revenue Department (RD; Thai: กรมสรรพากร)	—
Turkey	Turkish Revenue Administration	—
Ukraine	State Tax Service of Ukraine (Ukrainian: Державна податкова служба України; ДПС України)	—
Uganda	Uganda Revenue Authority (URA)	—
United Kingdom	His Majesty's Revenue and Customs (HMRC; Welsh: Cyllid a Thollau Ei Fawrhydi)	—
Scotland	Revenue Scotland (Scottish Gaelic: Teachd-a-steach Alba)	—
Wales	Welsh Revenue Authority (Welsh: Awdurdod Cyllid Cymru)	—
United States	Internal Revenue Service (IRS)	—
Uruguay	General Tax Directorate (Spanish: Dirección General Impositiva; DGI)	—
Venezuela	National Integrated Service for the Administration of Customs Duties and Taxes (Spanish: Servicio Nacional Integrado de Administración Aduanera y Tributaria)	—
Zimbabwe	Zimbabwe Revenue Authority	—
Egypt	General Tax Authority (Arabic: مصلحة الضرائب العامة)	Article in Arabic
