= Member states of the World Customs Organization =

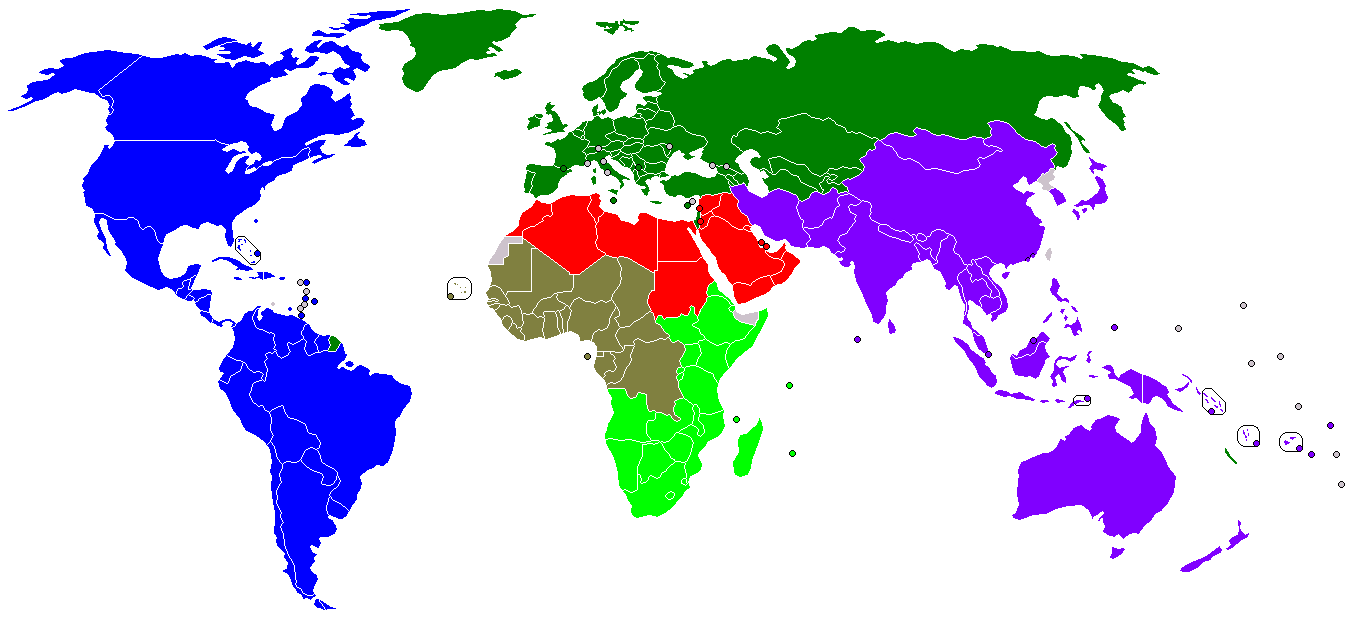
World Customs Organization members and WCO regions: North Africa, Near and Middle East West and Central Africa East and Southern Africa The Americas Europe Far East, South and South-East Asia, Australasia and Pacific islands

As of September 2025, the World Customs Organization has a total of 187 members. The European Communities (now: European Union) joined "on an interim basis akin to those enjoyed by WCO Members".

== Members list with date of membership ==
The 186 WCO members include 180 United Nations member states, one United Nations General Assembly non-member observer state (Palestine), as well as Kosovo and 4 customs territories which are dependent territories. Those 186 members and the European Union are divided into the following regional groups:

=== East and Southern Africa ===
- United Nations member states
  - Angola— 1990-09-26
  - Botswana— 1978-08-25
  - Burundi— 1964-10-20
  - Comoros— 1993-07-01
  - Djibouti— 2008-03-19
  - Eritrea— 1995-08-08
  - Eswatini— 1981-05-15
  - Ethiopia— 1973-08-06
  - Kenya— 1965-05-24
  - Lesotho— 1978-08-02
  - Madagascar— 1964-02-18
  - Malawi— 1966-06-06
  - Mauritius— 1973-03-29
  - Mozambique— 1987-07-01
  - Namibia— 1992-07-01
  - Rwanda— 1964-03-03
  - Seychelles— 2000-07-25
  - Somalia— 2012-10-04
  - South Sudan— 2012-07-18
  - South Africa— 1964-03-24
  - Tanzania— 1964-11-07
  - Uganda— 1964-11-03
  - Zambia— 1978-09-27
  - Zimbabwe— 1981-03-19

=== Europe ===
- United Nations member states (founders in bold)
  - Albania— 1992-08-31
  - Andorra— 1998-09-03
  - Armenia— 1992-06-30
  - **Austria**— 1953-01-21
  - Azerbaijan— 1992-06-17
  - Belarus— 1993-12-16
  - **Belgium**— 1952-12-11
  - Bosnia and Herzegovina— 2008-07-04
  - Bulgaria— 1973-08-01
  - Croatia— 1993-07-01
  - Cyprus— 1967-08-31
  - Czech Republic— 1993-01-01
  - **Denmark**— 1951-10-19
  - Estonia— 1992-06-18
  - Finland— 1961-01-27
  - **France**— 1952-10-06
  - Georgia— 1993-10-26
  - **Germany**— 1952-11-04
  - **Greece**— 1951-12-10
  - Hungary— 1968-09-16
  - Iceland— 1971-02-15
  - **Ireland**— 1952-09-23
  - Israel— 1958-05-23
  - **Italy**— 1952-11-20
  - Kazakhstan— 1992-06-30
  - Kyrgyzstan— 2000-02-10
  - Latvia— 1992-06-22
  - Lithuania— 1992-06-18
  - **Luxembourg**— 1953-01-23
  - Malta— 1968-07-06
  - Moldova— 1994-10-28
  - Montenegro— 2006-10-24
  - **Netherlands**— 1953-01-23
  - North Macedonia— 1994-07-01
  - **Norway**— 1951-08-06
  - Poland— 1974-07-17
  - **Portugal**— 1953-01-26
  - Romania— 1969-01-15
  - Russia— 1991-07-08
  - Serbia— 2001-03-27
  - Slovakia— 1993-01-01
  - Slovenia— 1992-09-07
  - **Spain**— 1952-07-13
  - **Sweden**— 1952-10-17
  - **Switzerland**— 1952-12-19
  - Tajikistan— 1997-07-01
  - **Turkey**— 1951-06-06
  - Turkmenistan— 1993-05-17
  - Ukraine— 1992-06-26
  - **United Kingdom**— 1952-09-12
  - Uzbekistan— 1992-07-28
- non-UN member, partially recognised state
  - Kosovo— 2017-01-25
- customs union
  - European Union

=== Far East, South and South East Asia, Australasia and the Pacific Islands ===
- United Nations member states
  - Afghanistan— 2004-08-10
  - Australia— 1961-01-05
  - Bangladesh— 1978-07-01
  - Bhutan— 2002-02-12
  - Brunei Darussalam— 1996-07-01
  - Cambodia— 2001-04-03
  - PR China— 1983-07-18
  - Fiji— 1997-07-01
  - India— 1971-02-15
  - Indonesia— 1957-04-30
  - Iran— 1959-10-16
  - Japan— 1964-01-15
  - Laos— 2007-01-16
  - Malaysia— 1964-06-30
  - Maldives— 1995-09-08
  - Mongolia— 1991-09-17
  - Myanmar— 1991-03-25
  - Nepal— 1986-07-22
  - New Zealand— 1963-05-16
  - Palau— 2024-02-02
  - Pakistan— 1955-11-16
  - Papua New Guinea— 2002-03-18
  - Philippines— 1980-10-01
  - Samoa— 2001-10-01
  - Singapore— 1975-07-09
  - Solomon Islands— 2023-01-26
  - South Korea— 1968-07-02
  - Sri Lanka— 1967-05-29
  - Thailand— 1972-02-04
  - Timor-Leste— 2003-09-19
  - Tonga— 2005-07-01
  - Vanuatu— 2009-11-17
  - Vietnam— 1993-07-01
- dependent, customs territories
  - Hong Kong— 1987-07-01
  - Macau— 1993-07-07

=== North of Africa, Near and Middle East ===
- United Nations member states
  - Algeria— 1966-12-19
  - Bahrain— 2001-04-18
  - Egypt— 1956-10-26
  - Iraq— 1990-06-06
  - Jordan— 1964-01-01
  - Kuwait— 1993-10-04
  - Lebanon— 1960-05-20
  - Libya— 1983-01-11
  - Morocco— 1968-07-01
  - Oman— 2000-09-11
  - Qatar— 1992-05-04
  - Saudi Arabia— 1973-05-08
  - Sudan— 1960-06-08
  - Syria— 1959-11-19
  - Tunisia— 1966-07-20
  - United Arab Emirates— 1979-02-07
  - Yemen— 1993-07-01
- United Nations General Assembly non-member observer state
  - Palestine— 2015-03-24

=== South America, North America, Central America and the Caribbean ===
- United Nations member states
  - Antigua and Barbuda— 2017-04-10
  - Argentina— 1968-07-01
  - Bahamas— 1974-08-16
  - Barbados— 1999-01-07
  - Belize— 2008-04-22
  - Bolivia— 1997-08-14
  - Brazil— 1981-01-19
  - Canada— 1971-10-12
  - Chile— 1966-07-01
  - Colombia— 1993-07-11
  - Costa Rica— 2001-08-29
  - Cuba— 1988-07-01
  - Dominican Republic— 2004-07-28
  - Ecuador— 1997-12-16
  - El Salvador— 2005-07-07
  - Guatemala— 1985-02-22
  - Guyana— 1976-07-29
  - Haiti— 1958-01-31
  - Honduras— 2005-12-08
  - Jamaica— 1963-03-29
  - Mexico— 1988-02-08
  - Nicaragua— 1998-09-24
  - Panama— 1996-03-08
  - Paraguay— 1969-10-03
  - Peru— 1970-01-27
  - Saint Lucia— 2005-05-12
  - Saint Vincent and the Grenadines— 2025-09-17
  - Suriname— 2018-11-26
  - Trinidad and Tobago— 1973-10-15
  - United States— 1970-11-05
  - Uruguay— 1977-09-16
  - Venezuela— 1996-07-01
- dependent, customs territories
  - Netherlands Antilles— 1988-07-11
    - Aruba
    - Curaçao
    - Sint Maarten
  - Bermuda— 1990-07-01

=== West and Central Africa ===
- United Nations member states
  - Benin— 1998-11-09
  - Burkina Faso— 1966-09-16
  - Cameroon— 1965-04-09
  - Cape Verde— 1992-07-01
  - Central African Republic— 1986-07-28
  - Chad— 2005-02-16
  - Congo, Democratic Republic of the— 1972-07-26
  - Congo, Republic of the— 1975-09-02
  - Equatorial Guinea— 2021-12-22
  - Gabon— 1965-02-18
  - Gambia— 1987-10-14
  - Ghana— 1968-08-01
  - Guinea— 1991-10-30
  - Guinea-Bissau— 2010-08-19
  - Ivory Coast— 1963-09-02
  - Liberia— 1975-01-07
  - Mali— 1987-08-07
  - Mauritania— 1979-10-02
  - Niger— 1981-07-01
  - Nigeria— 1963-08-21
  - São Tomé and Príncipe— 2009-09-23
  - Senegal— 1976-03-10
  - Sierra Leone— 1975-11-06
  - Togo— 1990-02-12

== Non-Members ==
The following UN member states are neither members nor observers of the WCO:

- Saint Kitts and Nevis
- Grenada
- Dominica
- Liechtenstein
- Monaco
- San Marino
- North Korea
- Marshall Islands
- Micronesia
- Kiribati
- Tuvalu
- Nauru

States not members of the United Nations

- Vatican City
- Cook Islands
- Niue
- Taiwan

The following states with limited recognition are not members of the WCO:

- Abkhazia
- South Ossetia
- Somaliland
- Transnistria
- Western Sahara
