= World Customs Organization =

Intergovernmental organization

- Abbreviation: WCO
- Formation: 26 January 1953; 73 years ago
- Type: Intergovernmental organization
- Location: Brussels, Belgium
- Members: 187 customs administrations
- Official language: English and French
- General Secretary: Ian Saunders (January 2024 - present)
- Website: www.wcoomd.org

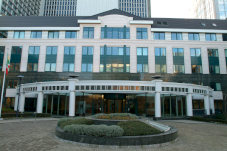
Headquarters building

The World Customs Organization (WCO; French: Organisation mondiale des douanes, OMD) is an intergovernmental organization headquartered in Brussels, Belgium. Notable projects include its collaboration with the WTO on trade facilitation and the implementation of the SAFE Framework of Standards to secure global supply chains. The WCO works on customs-related matters including the development of international conventions, instruments, and tools on topics such as commodity classification, valuation, rules of origin, collection of customs revenue, supply chain security, international trade facilitation, customs enforcement activities, combating counterfeiting in support of intellectual property rights (IPR), illegal drug enforcement, combating counterfeiting of medicinal drugs, illegal weapons trading, integrity promotion, and delivering sustainable capacity building to assist with customs reforms and modernization. The WCO maintains the international Harmonized System (HS) goods nomenclature, and administers the technical aspects of the World Trade Organization (WTO) Agreements on Customs Valuation and Rules of Origin. The WCO oversees the implementation of new technologies, artificial intelligence, to improve the efficiency of customs operations. Furthermore, the WCO is involved in addressing emerging issues, such as the digitalization of customs systems.

== History ==
On 23 August 1947 the Committee for European Economic Cooperation created a European Customs Union Study Group (ECUSG) to examine economic and technical issues of inter-European Customs Union concerning the rules of the General Agreement on Tariffs and Trade (GATT). In total, six ECUSG meetings were held in four years from November 1947 to June 1950. This work of ECUSG led to the adoption in 1950 of the Convention establishing the Customs Co-operation Council (CCC), which was signed in Brussels. On 26 January 1953 the CCC's inaugural session took place with the participation of 17 founding members. CCC membership subsequently expanded to cover all regions of the globe. In 1994, the organization adopted its current name, the World Customs Organization. Today, WCO members are responsible for customs controls in 187 countries representing more than 98 percent of all international trade.

One of the major turning points in the WCO’s history was its expansion beyond Europe, which allowed it to become a truly global organization. This expansion was fueled by the recognition of the need for standardized customs procedures across different regions of the world, particularly in the post-colonial period when many new nations were emerging. The WCO played a crucial role in helping these nations establish efficient customs administrations. In the 21st century, the WCO has emphasized digitalization and the harmonization of customs systems to address the challenges of global e-commerce and cross-border trade.

The development and implementation of the Harmonized System(HS) were direct institutional responses to the severe non-tariff barriers created by fragmented national customs nomenclatures during the late 20^{th} century’s expansion of global trade. Prior to 1988, the lack of a universal classification language resulted in inconsistent product categorization across borders, generating significant uncertainty, administrative delays, and high transaction costs for internationally-trading firms.

== Vision and objectives ==
The WCO is internationally acknowledged as the global center of customs expertise and plays a leading role in the discussion, development, promotion and implementation of modern customs systems and procedures. The WCO has supported the modernization of customs procedures in over 180 countries through initiatives like the Revised Kyoto Convention and the Harmonized System. It is responsive to the needs of its members and its strategic environment, and its instruments and best-practice approaches are recognized as the basis for sound customs administration throughout the world.

The WCO's primary objective is to enhance the efficiency effectiveness other members customs administrations, thereby assisting them to contribute successfully to national development goals, particularly revenue collection, national security, trade facilitation, community protection, and collection of trade statistics.

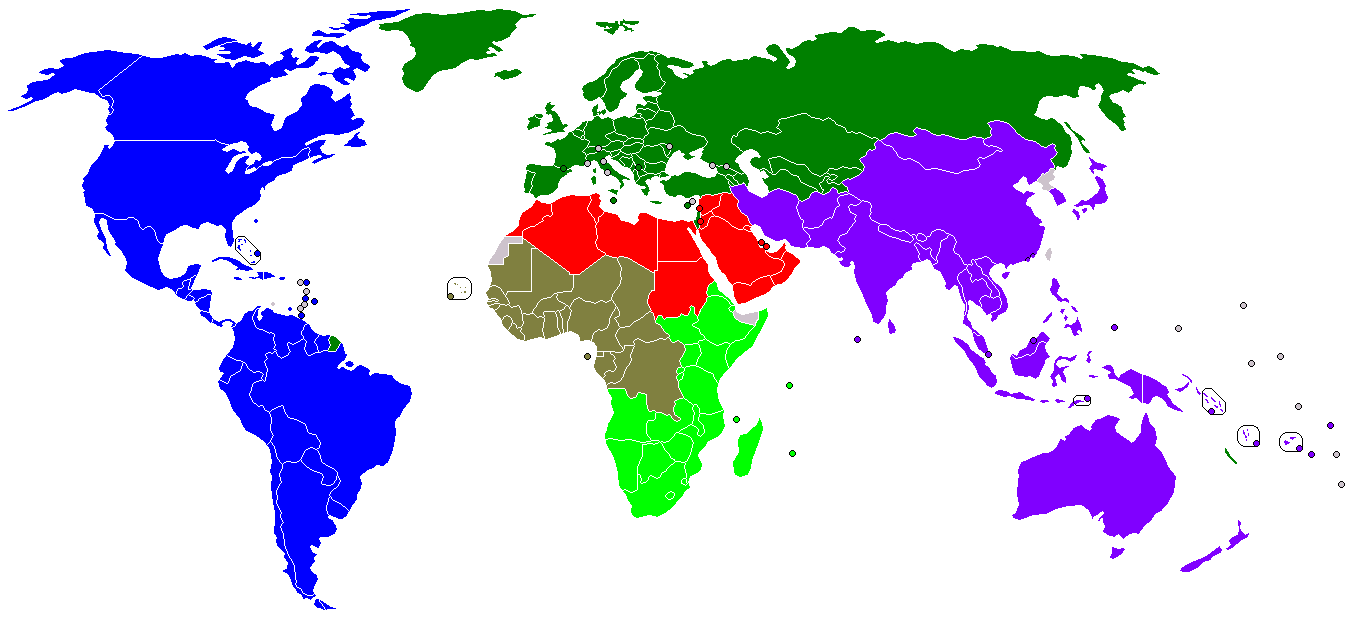

== Instruments ==
In order to achieve its objectives, the WCO has adopted a number of customs instruments, including but not limited to the following:

1. The International Convention on the Harmonized Commodity Description and Coding System (HS Convention) was adopted in 1983 and came into force in 1988. The HS multipurpose goods nomenclature is used as the basis for customs tariffs and for the compilation of international trade statistics. It comprises about 5,000 commodity groups, each identified by a six digit code arranged in a legal and logical structure with well-defined rules to achieve uniform classification. The HS is also used for many other purposes involving trade policy, rules of origin, monitoring of controlled goods, internal taxes, freight tariffs, transport statistics, quota controls, price monitoring, compilation of national accounts, and economic research and analysis.
2. The International Convention on the Simplification and Harmonization of Customs procedures (revised Kyoto Convention or RKC) was originally adopted in 1974 and was subsequently revised in 1999; the revised Kyoto Convention came into force in 2006. The RKC comprises several key governing principles: transparency and predictability of customs controls; standardization and simplification of the goods declaration and supporting documents; simplified procedures for authorized persons; maximum use of information technology; minimum necessary customs control to ensure compliance with regulations; use of risk management and audit based controls; coordinated interventions with other border agencies; and a partnership with the trade. It promotes trade facilitation and effective controls through its legal provisions that detail the application of simple yet efficient procedures and also contains new and obligatory rules for its application. The WCO revised Kyoto Convention is sometimes confused with the Kyoto Protocol, which is a protocol to the United Nations Framework Convention on Climate Change (UNFCCC or FCCC).
3. ATA Convention and the Convention on Temporary Admission (Istanbul Convention). Both the ATA Convention and the Istanbul Convention are WCO instruments governing temporary admission of goods. The ATA system, which is integral to both Conventions, allows the free movement of goods across frontiers and their temporary admission into a customs territory with relief from duties and taxes. The goods are covered by a single document known as the ATA carnet that is secured by an international guarantee system.
4. The Arusha Declaration on Customs Integrity was adopted in 1993 and revised in 2003. The Arusha Declaration is a non-binding instrument which provides a number of basic principles to promote integrity and combat corruption within customs administrations. Established in 1952, the WCO has introduced significant legal frameworks, including the SAFE Framework of Standards, aimed at simplifying customs procedures.
5. The SAFE Framework of Standards to Secure and Facilitate Global Trade was adopted in 2005. The SAFE Framework is a non-binding instrument that contains supply chain security and facilitation standards for goods being traded internationally, enables integrated supply chain management for all modes of transport, strengthens networking arrangements between customs administrations to improve their capability to detect high-risk consignments, promotes cooperation between customs and the business community through the Authorized Economic Operator (AEO) concept, and champions the seamless movement of goods through secure international trade supply chains.
6. The Columbus Program is a customs capacity building program works to promote customs modernization and implementation of their standards to secure and facilitate world trade. In 2005, the WCO adopted the Framework of Standards to Secure and Facilitate Global Trade, an international customs instrument containing 17 standards that promotes security and facilitation of the international supply chain. Because of its complexity, the WCO launched a capacity building program called the Columbus Programme which focuses on needs assessments for WCO Members using the WCO Diagnostic Framework tool. The WCO defines capacity building as "activities which strengthen the knowledge, abilities, skills and behaviour of individuals and improve institutional structures and processes such that the organization can efficiently meet its mission and goals in a sustainable way.

== Online tools ==
The World Customs Organization (WCO) released a new online platform, WCO Trade Tools, that encompasses the Harmonized System, preferential Rules of Origin and Valuation. It includes the 2002, 2007, 2012, 2017 and 2022 editions of the HS, around 400 Free Trade Agreements with their preferential Rules of Origin/ and Product Specific rules, and the set list of Valuation texts, including those of the Technical Committee on Customs Valuation.

== Administration ==
The WCO Secretariat is headed by a Secretary General, who is elected by the WCO membership to a five-year term. Ian Saunders from the United States was elected WCO Secretary General in June 2023 and took office on 1 January 2024. The WCO is governed by the council, which brings together all members of the organization once a year, in a meeting chaired by an elected chairperson. Additional strategic and management guidance is provided by the Policy and Finance committees. There are several other WCO committees, including the Harmonized System Committee, the Permanent Technical Committee, the Technical Committee on Customs Valuation, Technical Committee on Rules of Origin, the Capacity Building Committee, and the SAFE Working Group.

Under the leadership of recent Secretaries General, the WCO has increasingly embraced digital transformation in customs practices, focusing on the adoption of technology to streamline border processes. These initiatives, such as the implementation of artificial intelligence in customs operations, have placed the WCO at the forefront of modern customs administration, ensuring that its members are well-equipped to face the challenges of an increasingly interconnected global economy.

== Members ==
| Region | Member | Date Of Membership |
|---|---|---|
| South America, North America, Central America and the Caribbean | Antigua and Barbuda | 10/04/2017 |
| South America, North America, Central America and the Caribbean | Argentina | 01/07/1968 |
| South America, North America, Central America and the Caribbean | Bahamas | 16/08/1974 |
| South America, North America, Central America and the Caribbean | Barbados | 07/01/1999 |
| South America, North America, Central America and the Caribbean | Belize | 22/04/2008 |
| South America, North America, Central America and the Caribbean | Bermuda | 01/07/1990 |
| South America, North America, Central America and the Caribbean | Bolivia | 14/08/1997 |
| South America, North America, Central America and the Caribbean | Brazil | 19/01/1981 |
| South America, North America, Central America and the Caribbean | Canada | 12/10/1971 |
| South America, North America, Central America and the Caribbean | Chile | 01/07/1966 |
| South America, North America, Central America and the Caribbean | Colombia | 11/07/1993 |
| South America, North America, Central America and the Caribbean | Costa Rica | 29/08/2001 |
| South America, North America, Central America and the Caribbean | Cuba | 01/07/1988 |
| South America, North America, Central America and the Caribbean | Curaçao | 11/07/1988 |
| South America, North America, Central America and the Caribbean | Dominican Republic | 28/07/2004 |
| South America, North America, Central America and the Caribbean | Ecuador | 16/12/1997 |
| South America, North America, Central America and the Caribbean | El Salvador | 07/07/2005 |
| South America, North America, Central America and the Caribbean | Guatemala | 22/02/1985 |
| South America, North America, Central America and the Caribbean | Guyana | 29/07/1976 |
| South America, North America, Central America and the Caribbean | Haiti | 31/01/1958 |
| South America, North America, Central America and the Caribbean | Honduras | 08/12/2005 |
| South America, North America, Central America and the Caribbean | Jamaica | 29/03/1963 |
| South America, North America, Central America and the Caribbean | Mexico | 08/02/1988 |
| South America, North America, Central America and the Caribbean | Nicaragua | 24/09/1998 |
| South America, North America, Central America and the Caribbean | Panama | 08/03/1996 |
| South America, North America, Central America and the Caribbean | Paraguay | 03/10/1969 |
| South America, North America, Central America and the Caribbean | Peru | 27/01/1970 |
| South America, North America, Central America and the Caribbean | Saint Lucia | 12/05/2005 |
| South America, North America, Central America and the Caribbean | Saint Vincent and the Grenadines | 17/09/2025 |
| South America, North America, Central America and the Caribbean | Suriname | 26/11/2018 |
| South America, North America, Central America and the Caribbean | Trinidad and Tobago | 15/10/1973 |
| South America, North America, Central America and the Caribbean | United States | 05/11/1970 |
| South America, North America, Central America and the Caribbean | Uruguay | 16/09/1977 |
| South America, North America, Central America and the Caribbean | Venezuela | 01/07/1996 |
| Europe | Albania | 31/08/1992 |
| Europe | Andorra | 03/09/1998 |
| Europe | Armenia | 30/06/1992 |
| Europe | Austria | 21/01/1953 |
| Europe | Azerbaijan | 17/06/1992 |
| Europe | Belarus | 16/12/1993 |
| Europe | Belgium | 11/12/1952 |
| Europe | Bosnia and Herzegovina | 04/07/2008 |
| Europe | Bulgaria | 01/08/1973 |
| Europe | Croatia | 01/07/1993 |
| Europe | Cyprus | 31/08/1967 |
| Europe | Czech Republic | 01/01/1993 |
| Europe | Denmark | 19/10/1951 |
| Europe | Estonia | 18/06/1992 |
| Europe | European Union* | |
| Europe | Finland | 27/01/1961 |
| Europe | France | 06/10/1952 |
| Europe | Georgia | 26/10/1993 |
| Europe | Germany | 04/11/1952 |
| Europe | Greece | 10/12/1951 |
| Europe | Hungary | 16/09/1968 |
| Europe | Iceland | 15/02/1971 |
| Europe | Ireland | 23/09/1952 |
| Europe | Israel | 23/05/1958 |
| Europe | Italy | 20/11/1952 |
| Europe | Kazakhstan | 30/06/1992 |
| Europe | Kyrgyzstan | 10/02/2000 |
| Europe | Kosovo | 25/01/2017 |
| Europe | Latvia | 22/06/1992 |
| Europe | Lithuania | 18/06/1992 |
| Europe | Luxembourg | 23/01/1953 |
| Europe | Malta | 06/07/1968 |
| Europe | Moldova | 28/10/1994 |
| Europe | Montenegro | 24/10/2006 |
| Europe | Netherlands | 23/01/1953 |
| Europe | Norway | 06/08/1951 |
| Europe | North Macedonia | 01/07/1994 |
| Europe | Poland | 17/07/1974 |
| Europe | Portugal | 26/01/1953 |
| Europe | Romania | 15/01/1969 |
| Europe | Russian Federation | 08/07/1991 |
| Europe | Serbia | 27/03/2001 |
| Europe | Slovakia | 01/01/1993 |
| Europe | Slovenia | 07/09/1992 |
| Europe | Spain | 13/07/1952 |
| Europe | Sweden | 17/10/1952 |
| Europe | Switzerland | 19/12/1952 |
| Europe | Tajikistan | 01/07/1997 |
| Europe | Türkiye (Republic of) | 06/06/1951 |
| Europe | Turkmenistan | 17/05/1993 |
| Europe | Ukraine | 26/06/1992 |
| Europe | United Kingdom | 12/09/1952 |
| Europe | Uzbekistan | 28/07/1992 |
| East and Southern Africa | Angola | 26/09/1990 |
| East and Southern Africa | Botswana | 25/08/1978 |
| East and Southern Africa | Burundi | 20/10/1964 |
| East and Southern Africa | Comoros | 01/07/1993 |
| East and Southern Africa | Djibouti | 19/03/2008 |
| East and Southern Africa | Eritrea | 08/08/1995 |
| East and Southern Africa | Eswatini | 15/05/1981 |
| East and Southern Africa | Ethiopia | 06/08/1973 |
| East and Southern Africa | Kenya | 24/05/1965 |
| East and Southern Africa | Lesotho | 02/08/1978 |
| East and Southern Africa | Madagascar | 18/02/1964 |
| East and Southern Africa | Malawi | 06/06/1966 |
| East and Southern Africa | Mauritius | 29/03/1973 |
| East and Southern Africa | Mozambique | 01/07/1987 |
| East and Southern Africa | Namibia | 01/07/1992 |
| East and Southern Africa | Rwanda | 03/03/1964 |
| East and Southern Africa | Seychelles | 25/07/2000 |
| East and Southern Africa | Somalia | 04/10/2012 |
| East and Southern Africa | South Africa | 24/03/1964 |
| East and Southern Africa | South Sudan | 18/07/2012 |
| East and Southern Africa | Tanzania | 07/11/1964 |
| East and Southern Africa | Uganda | 03/11/1964 |
| East and Southern Africa | Zambia | 27/09/1978 |
| East and Southern Africa | Zimbabwe | 19/03/1981 |
| North of Africa, Near and Middle East | Algeria | 19/12/1966 |
| North of Africa, Near and Middle East | Bahrain | 18/04/2001 |
| North of Africa, Near and Middle East | Egypt | 26/10/1956 |
| North of Africa, Near and Middle East | Iraq | 06/06/1990 |
| North of Africa, Near and Middle East | Jordan | 01/01/1964 |
| North of Africa, Near and Middle East | Kuwait | 04/10/1993 |
| North of Africa, Near and Middle East | Lebanon | 20/05/1960 |
| North of Africa, Near and Middle East | Libya | 11/01/1983 |
| North of Africa, Near and Middle East | Morocco | 01/07/1968 |
| North of Africa, Near and Middle East | Oman | 11/09/2000 |
| North of Africa, Near and Middle East | Palestine | 24/03/2015 |
| North of Africa, Near and Middle East | Qatar | 04/05/1992 |
| North of Africa, Near and Middle East | Saudi Arabia | 08/05/1973 |
| North of Africa, Near and Middle East | Sudan | 08/06/1960 |
| North of Africa, Near and Middle East | Syrian Arab Republic | 19/11/1959 |
| North of Africa, Near and Middle East | Tunisia | 20/07/1966 |
| North of Africa, Near and Middle East | United Arab Emirates | 07/02/1979 |
| North of Africa, Near and Middle East | Yemen | 01/07/1993 |
| West and Central Africa | Benin | 09/11/1998 |
| West and Central Africa | Burkina Faso | 16/09/1966 |
| West and Central Africa | Cameroon | 09/04/1965 |
| West and Central Africa | Cape Verde | 01/07/1992 |
| West and Central Africa | Central African Republic | 28/07/1986 |
| West and Central Africa | Chad | 16/02/2005 |
| West and Central Africa | Congo (Republic of the) | 02/09/1975 |
| West and Central Africa | Côte d'Ivoire | 02/09/1963 |
| West and Central Africa | Democratic Republic of the Congo | 26/07/1972 |
| West and Central Africa | Equatorial Guinea | 22/12/2021 |
| West and Central Africa | Gabon | 18/02/1965 |
| West and Central Africa | Gambia | 14/10/1987 |
| West and Central Africa | Ghana | 01/08/1968 |
| West and Central Africa | Guinea | 30/10/1991 |
| West and Central Africa | Guinea-Bissau | 19/08/2010 |
| West and Central Africa | Liberia | 07/01/1975 |
| West and Central Africa | Mali | 07/08/1987 |
| West and Central Africa | Mauritania | 02/10/1979 |
| West and Central Africa | Niger | 01/07/1981 |
| West and Central Africa | Nigeria | 21/08/1963 |
| West and Central Africa | Sao Tome and Principe | 23/09/2009 |
| West and Central Africa | Senegal | 10/03/1976 |
| West and Central Africa | Sierra Leone | 06/11/1975 |
| West and Central Africa | Togo | 12/02/1990 |
| Far East, South and South East Asia, Australasia and the Pacific Islands | Afghanistan (Islamic Republic of) | 10/08/2004 |
| Far East, South and South East Asia, Australasia and the Pacific Islands | Australia | 05/01/1961 |
| Far East, South and South East Asia, Australasia and the Pacific Islands | Bangladesh | 01/07/1978 |
| Far East, South and South East Asia, Australasia and the Pacific Islands | Bhutan | 12/02/2002 |
| Far East, South and South East Asia, Australasia and the Pacific Islands | Brunei Darussalam | 01/07/1996 |
| Far East, South and South East Asia, Australasia and the Pacific Islands | Cambodia | 03/04/2001 |
| Far East, South and South East Asia, Australasia and the Pacific Islands | China | 18/07/1983 |
| Far East, South and South East Asia, Australasia and the Pacific Islands | Fiji | 01/07/1997 |
| Far East, South and South East Asia, Australasia and the Pacific Islands | Hong Kong, China | 01/07/1987 |
| Far East, South and South East Asia, Australasia and the Pacific Islands | India | 15/02/1971 |
| Far East, South and South East Asia, Australasia and the Pacific Islands | Indonesia | 30/04/1957 |
| Far East, South and South East Asia, Australasia and the Pacific Islands | Iran (Islamic Republic of) | 16/10/1959 |
| Far East, South and South East Asia, Australasia and the Pacific Islands | Japan | 15/06/1964 |
| Far East, South and South East Asia, Australasia and the Pacific Islands | Korea (Republic of) | 02/07/1968 |
| Far East, South and South East Asia, Australasia and the Pacific Islands | Lao People’s Democratic Republic | 16/01/2007 |
| Far East, South and South East Asia, Australasia and the Pacific Islands | Macao, China | 07/07/1993 |
| Far East, South and South East Asia, Australasia and the Pacific Islands | Malaysia | 30/06/1964 |
| Far East, South and South East Asia, Australasia and the Pacific Islands | Maldives | 08/09/1995 |
| Far East, South and South East Asia, Australasia and the Pacific Islands | Mongolia | 17/09/1991 |
| Far East, South and South East Asia, Australasia and the Pacific Islands | Myanmar (The Republic of the Union of) | 25/03/1991 |
| Far East, South and South East Asia, Australasia and the Pacific Islands | Nepal | 22/07/1986 |
| Far East, South and South East Asia, Australasia and the Pacific Islands | New Zealand | 16/05/1963 |
| Far East, South and South East Asia, Australasia and the Pacific Islands | Pakistan | 16/11/1955 |
| Far East, South and South East Asia, Australasia and the Pacific Islands | Palau | 02/02/2024 |
| Far East, South and South East Asia, Australasia and the Pacific Islands | Papua New Guinea | 18/03/2002 |
| Far East, South and South East Asia, Australasia and the Pacific Islands | Philippines | 01/10/1980 |
| Far East, South and South East Asia, Australasia and the Pacific Islands | Solomon Islands | 26/01/2023 |
| Far East, South and South East Asia, Australasia and the Pacific Islands | Samoa | 01/10/2001 |
| Far East, South and South East Asia, Australasia and the Pacific Islands | Singapore | 09/07/1975 |
| Far East, South and South East Asia, Australasia and the Pacific Islands | Sri Lanka | 29/05/1967 |
| Far East, South and South East Asia, Australasia and the Pacific Islands | Thailand | 04/02/1972 |
| Far East, South and South East Asia, Australasia and the Pacific Islands | Timor-Leste | 19/09/2003 |
| Far East, South and South East Asia, Australasia and the Pacific Islands | Tonga | 01/07/2005 |
| Far East, South and South East Asia, Australasia and the Pacific Islands | Vanuatu | 17/11/2009 |
| Far East, South and South East Asia, Australasia and the Pacific Islands | Vietnam | 01/07/1993 |

- Status akin to WCO membership
