= List of schools in Zambia =

The following is a list of notable schools in Zambia.

All schools in Zambia whether public or private or community based are registered with the Ministry of Education (MOE). The Mandate of the Ministry of Education (MOE) is to formulate and implement Education and Science Policies, set and enforce standards and regulations, licence, supervise and provide education and skills development, as well as promote science, technology and innovation education.

Notable schools include:

== Primary schools ==
- Rhodes Park School
- Sakeji School

== Secondary schools ==
- Banani International Secondary School
- Baobab College
- Chengelo Secondary School
- Chizongwe Secondary School
- David Kaunda Technical High School
- Hillcrest Technical Secondary School
- International School of Lusaka
- Kamwala Secondary School
- Kitwe Boys Secondary School
- Linda Secondary School
- Munali Secondary School
- Ndola Girls Technical High School
- Rhodes Park School

== Colleges ==
- Charles Lwanga College of Education
- Evelyn Hone College
- Kasama College of Education
- Northern Technical College
- Zambia Forestry College

== International schools ==
- American International School of Lusaka
- Banani International Secondary School
- Baobab College
- French School of Lusaka

== See also ==
- Education in Zambia
- Lists of schools
