= Alimuddin Zumla =

British-Zambian physician

Sir Alimuddin Zumla KBE, FRCP, FRCPath, FRSB
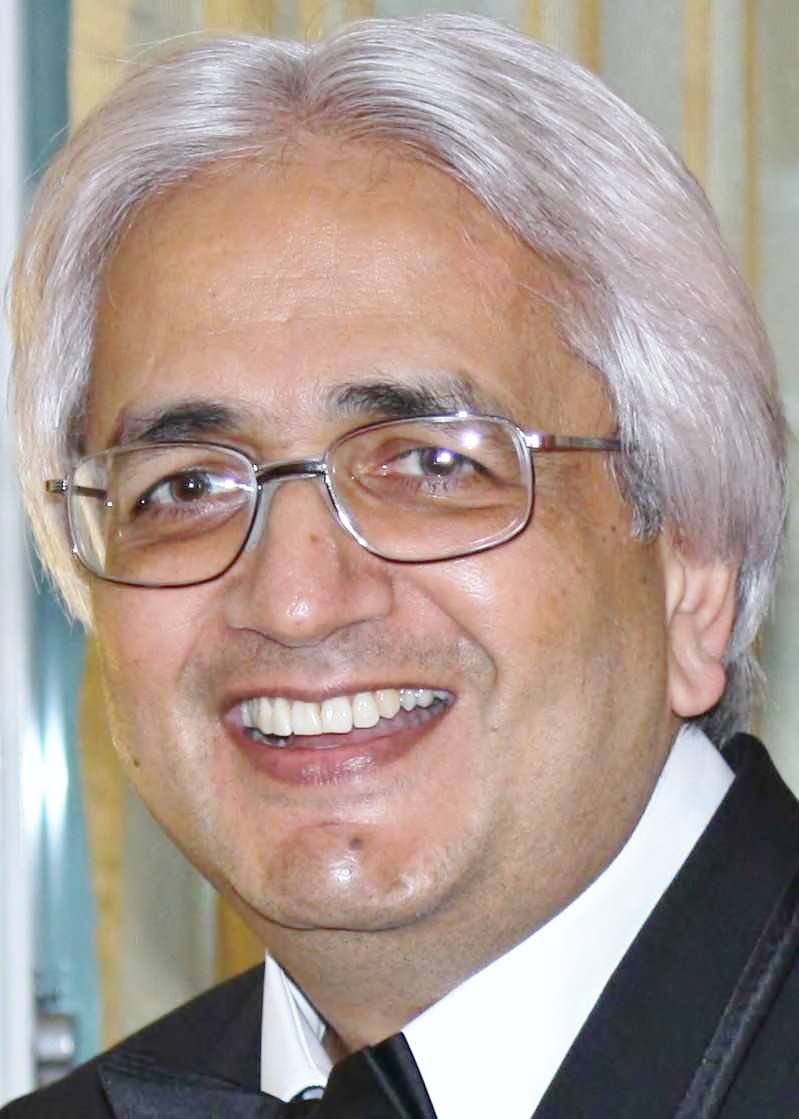
- Born: 15 May 1955 (age 71); Fort Jameson, Northern Rhodesia
- Education: University of Zambia; London School of Hygiene & Tropical Medicine; Royal Postgraduate Medical School; University of Texas Health Science Center at Houston
- Known for: Tuberculosis research Tropical medicine Infectious diseases Mass-gathering medicine COVID-19 research
- Spouse: Farzana Bhuta
- Awards: 2022: Manson Medal; 2021: EU-EDCTP Pascoal Mocumbi Prize; 2020: Mahathir Science Award; 2018: The Union Medal; 2015: Contribution to World Class Research Award; 2014: Donald Mackay Medal; 2012: Karolinska Institutet Science Award; 2011: WHO Stop TB Partnership, Kochon Foundation Prize and Medal; 2000: The Albert Chalmers Medal; 1999: Weber-Parkes Trust Medal
- Scientific career
- Fields: Medicine; Tuberculosis; Global health
- Workplaces: University College London; UCL Hospitals NHS Foundation Trust
- Thesis: Characterisation of human monoclonal antibodies to phenolic glycolipid -1 from patients with leprosy : and production of their anti-idiotypes (1987)
- Doctoral advisors: Keith McAdam; David Isenburg
- Website: https://iris.ucl.ac.uk/iris/browse/profile?upi=AZUML60 http://www.unza-uclms.org/

Sir Alimuddin Zumla (born 15 May 1955) is a British-Zambian professor of infectious diseases and international health at University College London Medical School, and a Consultant Infectious Diseases physician at UCLHospitals NHS Foundation Trust, London, UK. He specialises in infectious and tropical diseases, clinical immunology, and internal medicine, with a special interest in HIV/AIDS, respiratory infections (including COVID-19 and Tuberculosis), pathogens with epidemic potential and diseases of poverty. He is known for his leadership of infectious/tropical diseases research and capacity development activities. He was awarded a Knighthood in the 2017 Queens Birthday Honours list for services to public health and protection from infectious disease. In 2012, he was awarded Zambia's highest civilian honour, the Order of the Grand Commander of Distinguished services - First Division. In 2024, for the seventh consecutive year, Zumla was recognised by Clarivate Analytics, Web of Science as one of the world's top 1% most cited researchers. In 2021 Sir Zumla was elected as Fellow of The World Academy of Sciences. In 2024, he was elected Member of the prestigious Academy of Europe (Academia Europaea).

== Early life ==
Alimuddin "Ali" Zumla was born in Northern Rhodesia (now Chipata, Eastern Province, Zambia). His parents Ismail and Aman Zumla were of Gujarat state, ,India origin. He resided in the Kamwala district of Lusaka. He did his early education at the Lotus Primary School and Prince Philip Secondary School (now Kamwala Secondary School) in Lusaka, and his medical training at the University of Zambia's School of Medicine. As a teenager, he declined a Rhodes Scholarship in order to pursue medical training in Zambia.

In 1980, Zumla moved to London to pursue an MSc in tropical medicine at the University of London. In 1982, he contracted life-threatening tuberculous meningitis, and was told that he would never walk again, but went on to recover and return to work a year and a half later despite disabling and painful neurological sequelae resulting from his meningitis. He went on to pursue doctoral studies on leprosy human monoclonal antibodies at the London School of Hygiene & Tropical Medicine, where his 1987 dissertation (advised by Keith McAdam) merited him the Alan Woodruff Medal.

== Career ==
Zumla spent a year at the London School of Hygiene and Tropical Medicine gaining the MSc degree in Clinical Tropical Diseases with a distinction and the Murgratroyd Prize. He subsequently worked at The Royal Northern and Royal Free Hospitals under the mentorship of David Geraint James obtaining his Membership of The Royal College of Physicians of London.

After doing a PhD between 1985 and 1987, Zumla worked as infectious diseases registrar and at the Rush Green Regional Hospital for Infectious Diseases in Romford under Ming Yong and Mervyn Medlock. Whilst working at Rush Green Hospital, he identified and notified the first cases of the 1988 Legionnaires' Diseases outbreak which he traced back to Broadcasting House, BBC, central London.

Zumla subsequently spent four years in a senior registrar/honorary lecturer position at the Hammersmith Hospital, Royal Postgraduate Medical School in London under Sir Robert Lechler, and then two years at the University of Texas Center for Infectious Diseases working with Herbert DuPont. He then returned to his native Zambia to work on AIDS-related opportunistic infections at the University Teaching Hospital in Lusaka before moving to University College London in 1994.

In 2003, there were media reports about a paper of Zumla's in The Lancet discussing a new test developed by a team he led for monitoring CD4 immune cell counts based on dried blood samples. Such counts are used in monitoring AIDS patients taking antiretroviral drug treatments; Zumla's subsequent work has led to development and evaluation of a range of rapid, cheap and more accessible diagnostic tests for TB and respiratory infections for use on patients in developing countries.

Zumla was the guest editor of the Lancet TB Series which addressed key issues around TB treatment and diagnosis. The launch was held at the World Health Organisation (WHO) in Geneva on 18 May 2010. As of 2011, Zumla is the director of the Centre for Infectious Diseases and International Health at University College London Medical School, as well as a consultant in infectious diseases at University College Hospital. His research interests include tuberculosis (particularly drug clinical trials, biomarkers, MDR-TB and TB in London), HIV/AIDS, tropical diseases, respiratory infections (and rapid diagnostics thereof), endocarditis, biomarkers, and transrenal DNA.

Zumla's work focuses on improving global health, especially for disadvantaged populations, with an emphasis on assisting poorer and disadvantaged peoples of the world. He established and directs a multi-country collaboration with several African, Middle Eastern, European and United States institutions on collaborative research and training program on TB and HIV/AIDS. Zumla and his collaborators have set up research and training programs in Africa, focusing attention on development of local infrastructure and capacity development. Several of his doctoral students now occupy academic positions in institutions in Africa.

Zumla has established north–south partnerships for TB research. His collaborations span five countries in Europe and 10 in sub-Saharan Africa, where he leads several multi-country research projects. His team's research findings have contributed to the development of WHO's management guidelines on treatment and prevention of TB and TB/HIV, and to improvements in the care of patients worldwide.

In 2014, together with colleagues from Public Health England, World Health Organization, London School of Hygiene and Tropical Medicine, and the Middle East, Zumla co-led The Lancet series on Mass Gatherings Medicine which was launched at the World Health Assembly of Ministers of Health in Geneva. This was a Series of reports about different mass gatherings: the London 2012 Olympic and Paralympic Games; the 2012 European Football Championship finals, hosted jointly by Poland and Ukraine; and the 2012 and 2013 Hajj. These reports set out the planning and surveillance systems used to monitor public health risks, and describe the public health experiences and lessons learnt for the planning of future events. In 2024 a study published in The Lancet co-led by Sir Zumla and Dr Brian McCloskey of Chatham House –involving an international group of public health experts from the UK, Japan, Switzerland and the US outlines how mass gathering events can be held safely even in the context of an infectious disease pandemic.

Zumla played a lead role in defining the etiology, epidemiology, virology, pathogenesis, mode of transmission, diagnosis, management and infection control measures of Middle East respiratory syndrome coronavirus. His publications have emphasised the importance of development of new therapeutics and vaccines.

Zumla has served on numerous international advisory groups. He was Member of Court of Governors of the London School of Hygiene and Tropical Medicine (2007–2014), under the directorship of Sir Andrew Haines. He was vice president of the Royal Society of Tropical Medicine and Hygiene (2003–2005). He served as Vice Chair of the Strategic Advisory Group to the European and Developing Countries Clinical Trials Partnership(2014–2016)

On 7 April 2015, at an inaugural meeting in Cape Town, South Africa, Zumla and Markus Maeurer from Karolinska Institutet, Sweden led and established a new initiative, the Host-Directed Therapies Network (HDT-NET) consortium of 64 global partners to tackle global infectious diseases threats of multi-drug resistant TB and antimicrobial resistance.

In 2020, Zumla was cited as a leading expert on the COVID-19 pandemic.

In 2021 Zumla was elected as Fellow of The World Academy of Sciences whose principal aim is to promote scientific capacity and excellence for sustainable development in developing countries.

In 2022 Zumla was profiled in the Lancet. On 12 October 2022, the Royal Society of Tropical Medicine and Hygiene awarded Zumla the Sir Patrick Manson Medal, their highest mark of distinction. Zumla is the first ethnic minority recipient of this award since its conception in 1923.

In 2024, together with colleagues from UK-Health security Agency, London School of Hygiene and Tropical Medicine, WHO and other global ONE-HEALTH investigators, Zumla co-led The Lancet Series on One Health and Global Health Security. This was a four-paper series exploring the adoption of One Health approaches to improve health security and include an analysis of the current landscape of preventive, surveillance, and response measures in outbreak situations of emerging and re-emerging zoonotic infectious diseases with epidemic potential, antimicrobial resistance, environmental and chemical hazards and natural disasters. On November 26 Zumla was awarded the Long Service Lifetime Achievement award by the UCLHospitals NHS Fiundation Trust.

== Awards ==
Year	Category	Institution or publication	Result	Notes	Ref.
1999	Weber Parkes Trust Medal and Prize	Royal College of Physicians of London	Won	Awarded triennially from 1897 for work in the prevention and cure of tuberculosis.	
2000	Albert Chalmers Medal	Royal Society of Tropical Medicine and Hygiene	Won	Recognises researchers in tropical medicine or global health who demonstrate evidence of mentoring and professional development of junior investigators, and other forms of capacity building.	
2003	Windrush Award for Academic Achievement	African Caribbean Achievement Project	Won	The awards recognise talent and achievement in the African Caribbean, Asian and Oriental communities.	
2005	Ibn Sina Award for Medicine	The Muslim News Awards for Excellence	Won	Professional of the year for medicine.	
2011	Science Award	UK India International Foundation	Won	for outstanding achievements in science by a professional with origins in India.	
2011	Spinoza Leerstoel award	University of Amsterdam	Won	for "Outstanding research & capacity development achievements in the global fight against TB and TB/HIV/AIDS"	
2011	Kochon Prize and Medal	World Health Organisation (WHO) Stop TB Partnership	Won	Announced at the opening ceremony of the World Conference of the International Union Against Tuberculosis and Lung Disease (the Union) in Lille	
2012	Annual Science Prize	Karolinska Institutet	Won	For outstanding outputs in global health and infectious diseases	
2012	Grand Commander of the Order of Distinguished Services First Division	Republic of Zambia	Won	The highest Zambian civilian award. Bestowed on Zumla on the 48th anniversary of Zambia's Independence (October 2012) by then Zambian president Michael Sata for his outstanding contributions to infectious diseases research in sub-Saharan Africa, development of Zambia's health sector, and training of numerous health personnel.	
2016	Honorary doctorate	Karolinska Institutet	Won	To individuals for their important scientific achievements or significant contributions to the university or humanity at large.	
2016	European and Developing Countries Clinical Trials Partnership prize	European and Developing Countries Clinical Trials Partnership	Won	Won by a research consortium led by Zumla. Presented by Zambian President Edgar Lungu.	
2017	Senior investigator award	National Institute for Health and Care Research	Won	NIHR Senior Investigators are 'among the most prominent and prestigious researchers' and the most outstanding leaders within the NIHR Faculty. Senior Investigators are appointed from NIHR Investigators through annual competitions informed by the advice of an international panel of experts.	
2018	Annual global list of influential researchers	Clarivate Analytics, Web of Science	Won	World's top 1% most cited researchers.	
2019	Annual global list of influential researchers	Clarivate Analytics, Web of Science	Won	World's top 1% most cited researchers.	
2020	Annual global list of influential researchers	Clarivate Analytics, Web of Science	Won	World's top 1% most cited researchers.	
2020	Mahathir Science Award in Tropical Medicine	Mahathir Science Award Foundation, Academy of Sciences Malaysia	Won	A Malaysian science prize awarded to those who have made outstanding contributions to tropical sciences.	
2020	Dr Pascoal Mocumbi prize	EU-EDCTP	Won	Awarded to senior scientists, policy-makers or advocates for health and research	
2021	Annual global list of influential researchers	Clarivate Analytics, Web of Science	Won	World's top 1% most cited researchers.	
2022	Senior investigator award (Renewal)	National Institute for Health and Care Research	Won	NIHR Senior Investigators are 'among the most prominent and prestigious researchers' and the most outstanding leaders within the NIHR Faculty. Senior Investigators are appointed from NIHR Investigators through annual competitions informed by the advice of an international panel of experts.	
2022	Annual global list of influential researchers	Clarivate Analytics, Web of Science	Won	World's top 1% most cited researchers.	
2022	Sir Patrick Manson Medal	Royal Society of Tropical Medicine and Hygiene	Won	The Sir Patrick Manson Medal is the Royal Society of Tropical Medicine and Hygiene's highest mark of distinction. It is awarded once every three years to senior experts whose contribution to tropical medicine or hygiene is considered to merit the honour most.	
2023	Annual global list of influential researchers	Clarivate Analytics, Web of Science	Won	World's top 1% most cited researchers.	

== Quotes ==
"Everyone should hold hands together and move forward in the fight against killer infectious diseases"

== Selected works ==
Zumla has authored more than 700 publications and edited/published 21 medical textbooks, three of which are globally acknowledged classics: Manson's Tropical Diseases 21st and 22nd editions, Tuberculosis: A Comprehensive Clinical Reference which involves 156 global TB experts writing 104 chapters on all aspects of paediatric and adult TB, and Granulomatous Disorders co-edited with D. G. James.

=== Books ===
- Zumla Alimuddin and Abubakar Ibrahim (Senior Editors). Editors: Miriam Orcutt, Clare Shortall, Sarah Walpole, Aula Abbara, Sylvia Garry, Rita Issa (2022). CLINICAL HANDBOOK OF REFUGEE HEALTH (2021) ISBN 9781138612884. Nov, 2021 CRC Press Taylor and Francis
- Stefan HE Kaufmann, Eric Rubin, and Alimuddin Zumla. PERSPECTIVES IN MEDICINE (2015) Publisher: Cold Spring Harbor Press, USA. ISBN 978-1621820734
- Zumla Alimuddin and Hui David. (2019). EMERGING AND RE-EMERGING INFECTIOUS DISEASES. Hardcover ISBN 9780323708456 eBook ISBN 9780323708463. Elsevier Saunders, New York.
- Zumla, Alimuddin; Behrens, Ronald H.; Memish, Ziad A. (2012), Travel Medicine, An Issue of Infectious Disease Clinics (1st ed.), Philadelphia, PA: Saunders, ISBN 978-1-4557-4898-3, OCLC 815361562
- Zumla Alimuddin and Keiser Jennifer (Editors). TROPICAL DISEASES (2012) Publishers: Elsevier Saunders publishers, New York. ISBN 978-1-4557-3880-9.
- Zumla Alimuddin, Yew WWing-Wai and Hui David (2011). EMERGING RESPIRATORY INFECTIONS IN THE 21ST CENTURY. (2011). Publishers: Elsevier Saunders publishers, New York. ISBN 1437724604.
- Zumla Alimuddin, and Schaaf Simon. Clinics in Chest Medicine. TUBERCULOSIS. (2011). ( ISBN 9781437718041). Publisher: Elsevier publishers, London, New York.
- Schaaf, H. Simon; Zumla, Alimuddin, eds. (2009), Tuberculosis: a comprehensive clinical reference, Saunders/Elsevier, ISBN 978-1-4160-3988-4
- Zumla, Alimuddin; Schaaf, H. Simon (2009), Tuberculosis: An Issue of Clinics in Chest Medicine, Elsevier – Health Sciences Division, ISBN 978-1-4377-1804-1
- Cook, Gordon C; Zumla, Alimuddin, eds. (2008), Manson's Tropical Diseases (22nd ed.), London: Elsevier Harcourt Brace Publishing Group, ISBN 978-1-4160-4470-3
- Gandy Matthew and Zumla Alimuddin. (2003). THE RETURN OF THE WHITE PLAGUE: GLOBAL POVERTY AND THE NEW TUBERCULOSIS. Publishers: Verso Books, London: (20 chapters with 49 international authors). ISBN 978-1859846698
- Cook GC and Zumla A. Editors: (2003) MANSON'S TROPICAL DISEASES, 21st edition. Harcourt Brace Saunders Publishing Group, London ISBN 0702026409.
- James D Geraint and Zumla Alimuddin. (1999) GRANULOMATOUS DISORDERS Publishers: Cambridge University Press, Cambridge, UK. (1999). ISBN 978-0521592215
- Zumla, Alimuddin; Johnson, Margaret A.; Miller, Robert (1997), AIDS and respiratory medicine, Chapman & Hall Medical, ISBN 978-0-412-60140-8

=== Journal papers ===
- Nachega, Jean B.; Sam-Agudu, Nadia A.; Mellors, John W.; Zumla, Alimuddin; Mofenson, Lynne M. (31 March 2021). "Scaling Up Covid-19 Vaccination in Africa — Lessons from the HIV Pandemic". New England Journal of Medicine. 385 (3): 196–198. doi:10.1056/NEJMp2103313. ISSN 0028-4793. PMC 8291168. PMID 33789005.
- Carsetti, Rita; Quintarelli, Concetta; Quinti, Isabella; Piano Mortari, Eva; Zumla, Alimuddin; Ippolito, Giuseppe; Locatelli, Franco (2020). "The immune system of children: the key to understanding SARS-CoV-2 susceptibility?". The Lancet Child & Adolescent Health. 4 (6): 414–416. doi:10.1016/S2352-4642(20)30135-8. PMC 7202830. PMID 32458804.
- Zumla, Alimuddin; Hui, David S; Perlman, Stanley (2015). "Middle East respiratory syndrome". The Lancet. 386 (9997): 995–1007. doi:10.1016/S0140-6736(15)60454-8. PMC 4721578. PMID 26049252.
- McCloskey, B.; Endericks, T.; Catchpole, M.; Zambon, M.; McLauchlin, J.; Shetty, N.; Manuel, R.; Turbitt, D.; Smith, G.; Crook, P.; Severi, E.; Jones, J.; Ibbotson, S.; Marshall, R.; Smallwood, C. A. H.; Isla, N.; Memish, Z. A.; Al-Rabeeah, A. A.; Barbeschi, M.; Heymann, D. L.; Zumla, A. (2014). "London 2012 Olympic and Paralympic Games: Public health surveillance and epidemiology". The Lancet. 383 (9934): 2083–2089. doi:10.1016/S0140-6736(13)62342-9. PMC 7138022. PMID 24857700.
- Zumla A., Raviglione M., Hafner R., Fordham, von Reyn C. (2013). "Tuberculosis". New England Journal of Medicine. 368 (8): 745–755. doi:10.1056/NEJMra1200894. PMID 23425167.
- Nunn, Andrew J.; Mwaba, Peter B.; Chintu, Chifumbe; Crook, Angela M.; Darbyshire, Janet H.; Ahmed, Yusuf; Zumla, Alimuddin I. (April 2011), "Randomised, placebo-controlled trial to evaluate co-trimoxazole to reduce mortality and morbidity in HIV-infected post-natal women in Zambia (TOPAZ)", Tropical Medicine & International Health, 16 (4): 518–526, doi:10.1111/j.1365-3156.2011.02731.x, PMID 21281407, S2CID 31384786
- Griffiths, C.; Sturdy, P.; Brewin, P.; Bothamley, G.; Eldridge, S.; Martineau, A.; MacDonald, M.; Ramsay, J.; Tibrewal, S.; Levi, S.; Zumla, A.; Feder, G. (2007). "Educational outreach to promote screening for tuberculosis in primary care: A cluster randomised controlled trial". The Lancet. 369 (9572): 1528–34. doi:10.1016/S0140-6736(07)60707-7. PMID 17482983. S2CID 9170497.
- Perkins, M. D.; Roscigno, G.; Zumla, A. (2006), "Progress towards improved tuberculosis diagnostics for developing countries", The Lancet, 367 (9514): 942–3, doi:10.1016/S0140-6736(06)68386-4, PMID 16546544, S2CID 11903281
- Zumla, A; Mullan, Z (2006), "Turning the tide against tuberculosis", The Lancet, 367 (9514): 877–8, doi:10.1016/S0140-6736(06)68355-4, PMID 16546520, S2CID 20666586
- Chintu, C.; Bhat, G. J.; Walker, A. S.; Mulenga, V.; Sinyinza, F.; Lishimpi, K.; Farrelly, L.; Kaganson, N.; Zumla, A.; Gillespie, S. H.; Nunn, A. J.; Gibb, D. M. (2004). "Co-trimoxazole as prophylaxis against opportunistic infections in HIV-infected Zambian children (CHAP): A double-blind randomised placebo-controlled trial". The Lancet. 364 (9448): 1865–71. doi:10.1016/S0140-6736(04)17442-4. PMID 15555666. S2CID 503777.
- Mwaba, P.; Cassol, S.; Pilon, R.; Chintu, C.; Janes, M.; Nunn, A.; Zumla, A. (2003), "Use of dried whole blood spots to measure CD4+ lymphocyte counts in HIV-1-infected patients", The Lancet, 362 (9394): 1459–60, doi:10.1016/S0140-6736(03)14693-4, PMID 14602443, S2CID 34623423
- Mwaba, P.; Cassol, S.; Nunn, A.; Pilon, R.; Chintu, C.; Janes, M.; Zumla, A. (2003), "Whole blood versus plasma spots for measurement of HIV-1 viral load in HIV-infected African patients", The Lancet, 362 (9401): 2067–8, doi:10.1016/S0140-6736(03)15103-3, PMID 14697808, S2CID 21275947
- Chintu, C.; Mudenda, V.; Lucas, S.; Nunn, A.; Lishimpi, K.; Maswahu, D.; Kasolo, F.; Mwaba, P.; Bhat, G.; Terunuma, H.; Zumla, A. (2002), "Lung diseases at necropsy in African children dying from respiratory illnesses: a descriptive necropsy study", The Lancet, 360 (9338): 985–90, doi:10.1016/S0140-6736(02)11082-8, PMID 12383668, S2CID 32379604
- Mwinga, A.; Nunn, A.; Ngwira, B.; Chintu, C.; Warndorff, D.; Fine, P.; Darbyshire, J.; Zumla, A. (2002), "Mycobacterium vaccae (SRL172) immunotherapy as an adjunct to standard antituberculosis treatment in HIV-infected adults with pulmonary tuberculosis: a randomised placebo-controlled trial", The Lancet, 360 (9339): 1050–5, doi:10.1016/S0140-6736(02)11141-X, PMID 12383985, S2CID 20654344

=== Bibliographic databases ===
- ORCID 0000-0002-5111-5735
- Alimuddin Zumla publications indexed by Google Scholar
- Alimuddin Zumla's publications indexed by the Scopus bibliographic database. (subscription required)
- Search Results for author Zumla on PubMed.
