= Chizongwe Secondary School =

Coordinates: 13.59811°S 32.62034°E

Chizongwe Technical Secondary School
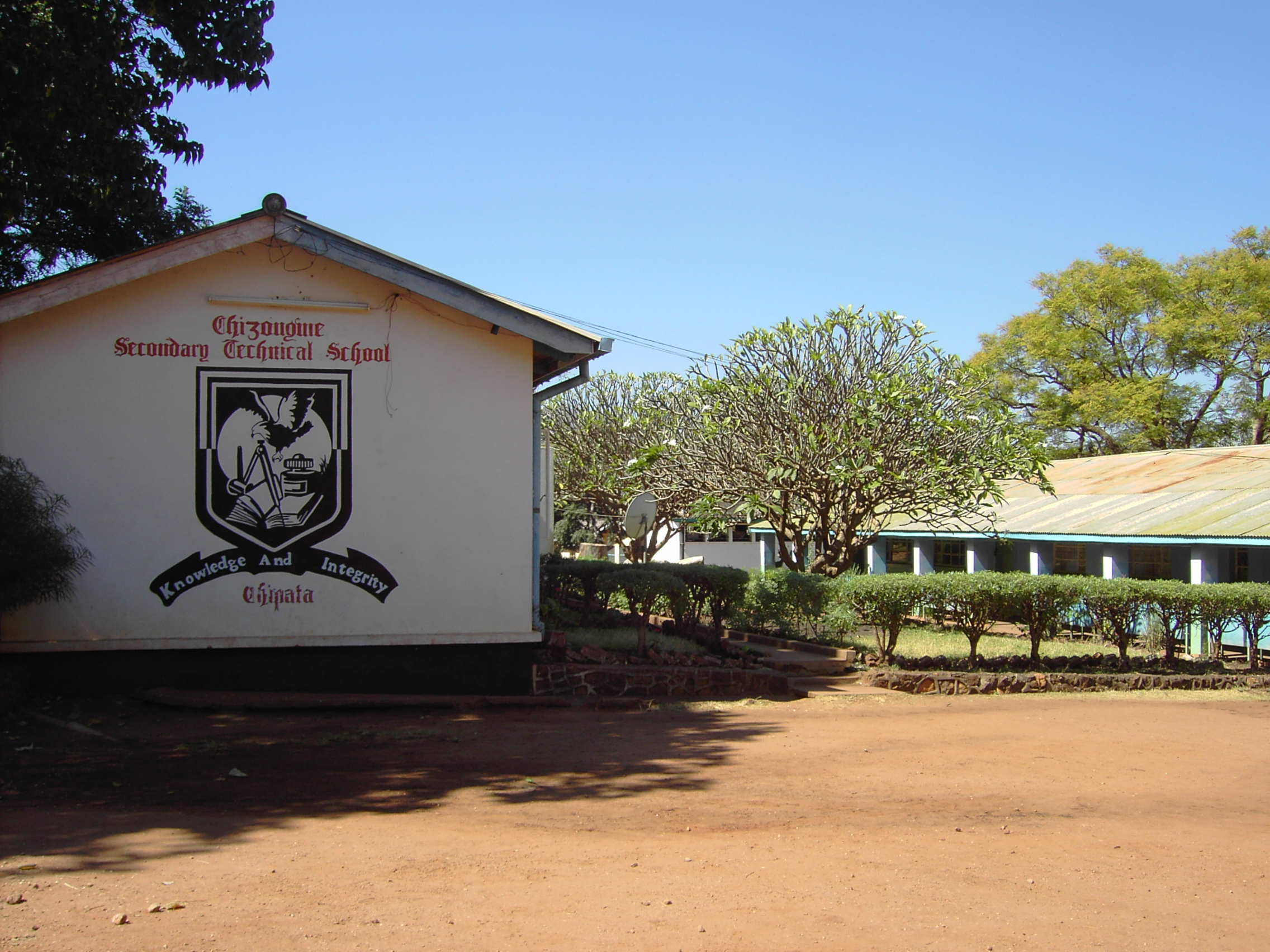
- Chipata; Zambia

Information
- Type: Public
- Motto: Providing Knowledge And Integrity
- Established: 1955
- Head teacher: Ronald Mugala (Current 2023-)
- Grades: 8-12
- Enrollment: 887
- Campus: 1
- Colours: Black suit, white shirt and bow-tie

Chizongwe Secondary School is a secondary (technical) school located north of Chipata, Eastern Province, Zambia. It was founded in the 1950s as Fort Jameson Trades School. It is the only technical school in Eastern Province.

During 1959 and 1960, Fort Jameson Trades School was involved in student protests against racial practices and the existence of the Federation of Rhodesia and Nyasaland, the latter being probed by the Monckton Commission.

Between 1966 and 1980 it was amongst the top five secondary schools in Zambia together with Munali (Lusaka), Linda High School (Livingstone), David Kaunda (Lusaka) and Luanshya Boys (Luanshya) and is still these days considered a school of excellence.
