= Kerrie Wilson =

Australian ecologist

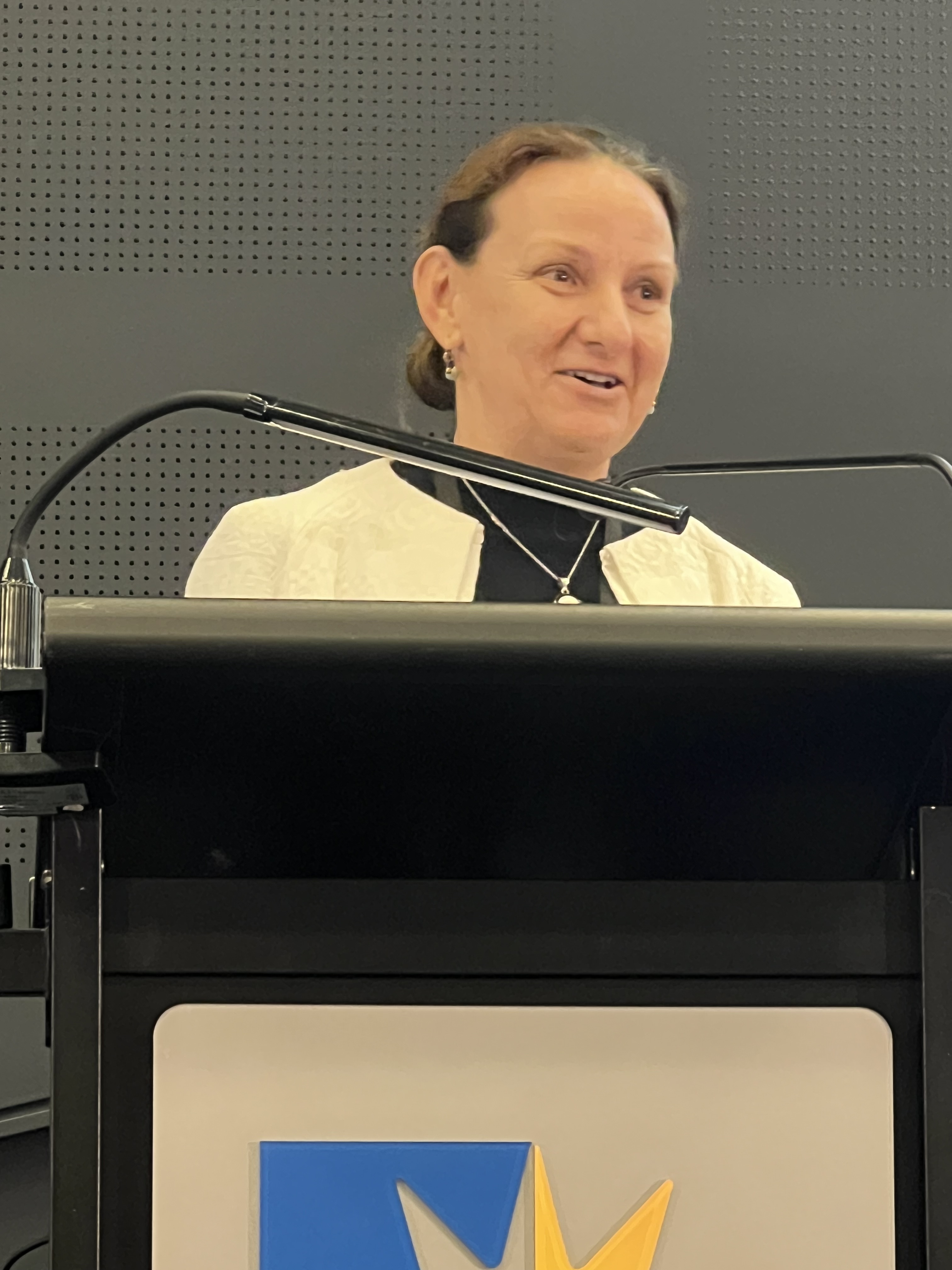
- Occupation: Queensland Chief Scientist

Kerrie Ann Wilson is an Australian environmental scientist who is the Queensland Chief Scientist and a Professor in the Faculty of Science at Queensland University of Technology (QUT). She was formerly the Pro Vice-Chancellor (Sustainability and Research Integrity) at QUT. Wilson is also an affiliated professor in conservation science at the University of Copenhagen, honorary professor at The University of Queensland, a member of the Australian Heritage Council and the Australian Natural Sciences Commissioner for UNESCO.

== Education ==
Wilson holds a bachelor's degree in environmental science (1999) from The University of Queensland and a PhD from The University of Melbourne (2004). Her PhD was undertaken in collaboration with the UN Environment Programme’s World Conservation Monitoring Centre, based in Cambridge.

== Career ==
From 2005 to 2007, Wilson held a postdoctoral research fellowship at The University of Queensland. In 2007, she left academia to become director of conservation with The Nature Conservancy Australia. She returned to The University of Queensland in 2008 after being awarded an Australian Research Council (ARC) Postdoctoral Fellowship. In 2010, Wilson was awarded an ARC Future Fellowship, which she commenced after returning from maternity leave in 2013.

In 2016, Wilson was appointed the director of the ARC Centre of Excellence for Environmental Decisions and professor of biological sciences at The University of Queensland. In 2019, Wilson became the executive director of the Institute for Future Environments at the Queensland University of Technology.

On 4 August 2023, Wilson was appointed the Queensland Chief Scientist succeeding Queensland’s Interim Chief Scientist, Professor Bronwyn Harch.

=== Research ===
Wilson's research bridges the science, policy and practice of conservation, with the aim of finding the most effective ways to protect and restore different kinds of landscapes and ecosystems. Her research focuses on applied conservation resource allocation problems, such as where to invest limited resources to protect or restore biodiversity and the role of ecosystem services in achieving conservation goals. She is a proponent of the theory that conservation investments should be influenced equally by biodiversity values, ecological dynamics and the socio-economic context.

Wilson has developed analytical approaches to capture the social context in environmental decision making and demonstrated how to integrate social, economic and ecological analyses to improve evaluation and prediction of the outcomes of environmental policies and programs. She has also made contributions to the field of ecosystem services through the integration of decision science with ecosystem service assessments to investigate how management can enhance human well-being while improving protection of the natural environment. Her research has provided foundation for identifying conservation strategies in production landscapes, that involve many alternative land management options, including on the island of Borneo.

Wilson has published over 170 peer-reviewed publications, including several in Nature and Science.

=== Awards and honours ===
- 2017 Australian Academy of Science Nancy Millis Medal for Women in Science
- 2017 Academy of Sciences Malaysia Mahathir Science Award
- 2016 Prime Minister's Frank Fenner Prize for Life Scientist of the Year
- 2015 Women in Technology Life Sciences Research Award
- 2014 Scopus Young Researcher Award in the Life and Biological Sciences
- 2014 Royal Society of South Australia HG Andrewartha Medal
- 2013 Australian Museum Eureka Prize for Outstanding Young Researcher
- 2013 University of Queensland Foundation Research Excellence Award

== Selected publications ==
- Wilson, K. A., Auerbach, N. A., Sam, K., Magini, A. G., Moss, A., Langhans, S. D., Budiharta, S., Terzano, D. and E. Meijaard. 2016. Conservation research is not happening where it is most needed. PLOS Biology. 14(3), e1002413. doi:10.1371/journal.pbio.1002413
- Wilson, K. A., Lulow, M., Burger, J., Fang, Y. C., Andersen, C., Olson, D., O’Connell, M., and M. F. McBride 2011. Optimal restoration: accounting for space, time, and uncertainty. Journal of Applied Ecology. 48(3), 715-725. doi:10.1111/j.1365-2664.2011.01975.x
- Wilson, K. A., Meijaard, E., Drummond, S., Grantham, H. S., Boitani, L., Catullo, G., Christie, L., Dennis, R., Dutton, I., Falcucci, A., Maiorano, L., Possingham, H. P., Rondinini, C., Turner, W., Venter, O. and M. Watts. 2010. Conserving Biodiversity in Production Landscapes. Ecological Applications. 20(6), 1721-1732. doi: 10.1890/09-1051.1
- Wilson, K. A., Carwardine, J. and H. P. Possingham. 2009. Setting Conservation Priorities. Annals of the New York Academy of Sciences. The Year in Ecology and Conservation Biology 2009. 1162(1), 237–264. doi:10.1111/j.1749-6632.2009.04149.x
- Wilson, K. A., Underwood, E. C., Morrison, S. A., Klausmeyer, K. R., Murdoch, W. W., Reyers, B., Wardell-Johnson, G., Marquet, P. A., Rundel, P. W., McBride, M. F., Pressey, R. L., Bode, M., Hoekstra, J. M., Andelman, S., Looker, M., Rondinini, C., Kareiva, P., Shaw, R. M. and H. P. Possingham. 2007. Conserving Biodiversity Efficiently: What to do, Where and When. PLOS Biology. 5(9), 1850-1861. ARTN e233. doi:10.1371/journal.pbio.0050223
- Wilson, K. A., McBride, M., Bode, M. and H. P. Possingham. 2006. Prioritising global conservation efforts. Nature. 440(7082), 337-340. doi:10.1038/nature04366
- Wilson, K. A., Westphal, M. I., Possingham, H. P. and J. Elith. 2005. Sensitivity of conservation planning to different approaches to using predicted species distribution data. Biological Conservation. 122(1), 99-112. doi:10.1016/j.biocon.2004.07.004
