= Milton Sipalo =

Zambian serial killer (died 1980)

Milton Mufungulwa Sipalo
- Died: 19 September 1980; Lusaka Central Police Station, Lusaka, Zambia
- Cause of death: Suicide by jumping from building
- Other name: "The Lusaka Strangler"
- Occupation: Corporal
- Years active: 1980

Details
- Victims: 30 killed (including an unborn child); 2 survived
- Country: Zambia
- State: Lusaka
- Date apprehended: 16 September 1980

Milton Mufungulwa Sipalo (died 19 September 1980), also known as the Lusaka Strangler, was a Zambian serial killer and rapist. The most prolific Zambian serial killer, Sipalo murdered 29 women and girls between January and September 1980. On 16 September 1980, one of his two surviving victims, accompanied by the police, went back to the bus station she was attacked at. She quickly recognized Sipalo as her attacker, and he was arrested. Three days later, Sipalo escaped the clutches of the police officers escorting him and ran to the roof of the police station he was being held at. He then jumped off the building, killing himself.

== Murders ==
Sipalo is credited with being the most active serial killer, murdering the most victims out of any serial killer within the shortest amount of time. On average, Sipalo murdered one victim every week.

His modus operandi consisted of luring victims from public areas, typically bus terminals and railway stations, and led them to secluded locations where he would rape and strangle them. He then left the victims in open spaces where they were likely to be discovered. Many of Sipalo's victims had strange mucus or foam oozing from their noses, indicating he could have used chemicals during his attacks. Sipalo sometimes surrounded his victims' bodies with coins or bottles, presumably to taunt the police.

All of the victims were women and girls who were Lozi or spoke Lozi. Many of the victims were travelers from other towns or cities. They were often identified by national registration cards left on their bodies.

=== List of murders ===
#	Name	Age	Body found	Details
1	Grace Shambilu	21	5 January	Police received an anonymous call alerting them that the body of a dead woman was lying in a field behind the Lusaka Boys Primary School. When they arrived at the field, they found the decomposing body of Grace Shambilu, quickly identifying her from her belongings. Although they could not determine a cause of death, the police suspected Shambilu had been killed in another area before her corpse was dumped in the field.
2	Unidentified	~21	6 January	The body of an unidentified woman was found lying along a footpath. She had been raped and then strangled to death. Investigators concluded she had been murdered in the same place her body was found, as the woman's belongings were strewn around the area.
3	Florence Mwangelwa Mulima	21	12 January	Sipalo raped and murdered Mulima and left her corpse behind a National Institute of Public Administration (NIPA) office.
4	Priscilla Ndhlovu	10	14 January	Ndhlovu's parents sent her to buy groceries. Sipalo strangled her to death and left her body in a Maize field between Olympic Park and Northmead.
5	Regina Munanga	25	28 January	Sipalo raped and fatally strangled Munanga, an off-duty police officer, between the University of Zambia and showgrounds. He left her ID lying on her body.
6	Clodia Maimbolwa	21	30 January	Sipalo strangled Maimbolwa to death near Nasser Roaf. Witnesses last saw her alive with a man dressed in a soldier uniform.
7	Millian Chipeta	20	7 February	Chipeta was strangled to death with a scarf in a corn field between Lusaka City Airport and long acres.
8	Unidentified	18–21	10 February	Sipalo raped and strangled a woman to death at an unknown location before dumping her body along Washama Road in Namununga. The woman was never identified.
9	Fosta Kaela	10	11 February	Sipalo strangled Kaela to death while she was walking home from school. Her body was found in a corn field between the city airport and Kalingalinga. Investigators found bootprints at the crime scene.
10	Grace Mutondo	26	17 February	Mutondo was raped and fatally strangled in a football pitch behind the hotel she had been staying at.
11	Fridah Ncube	32	25 February	Ncube's corpse was found near a hostel next to a primary school. Footprints indicated that Sipalo picked her up from her hotel before strangling her to death.
12	Jane Malako	18	13 March	Sipalo strangled Malako to death on a footpath after he picked her up from a bus station.
13	Hilda Banda	18	13 March	Banda was strangled to death with her own belt. Her corpse was found in the playfield of Kamwala Secondary School. She was last seen alive at a hotel.
14	Agather Musa Nasilele	~18	15 March	Nasilele was raped and fatally strangled along a footpath.
15	Emeldah Monde Chabazwa	26	23 March	Sipalo raped and murdered Chabazwa and draped her body over a bush.
16	Miriam Chiwala	15	25 March	the body of Miriam Chabazwa, raped and strangled to death, was found between Duly Motors and Chibolya compound. A message found near her body, written on cardboard, stated: "Nothing to say guys and don't mind at all what I told you when you were going for elections. Comrades no woman now. Please my friend be careful how you walk, yours no woman now."
17	Maggie Mwanza	21	4 April	Sipalo raped and strangled Mwanza to death before dumping her body along a footpath.
18	Regina Mumba	25	7 April	Sipalo fatally strangled Mumba and left her body behind a house near the city airport.
19	?	?	April	
20	Unidentified	?	4 May	The body of an unidentified young woman was found at the gate of Woodlands Stadium. She had been raped and strangled.
21	Kwaleyela Situmbeko	24	14 May	Situmbeko's body was found along a footpath. She was raped and strangled.
22	Rosemary Mufula Chuma	24	10 June	Sipalo picked up Chuma from a roadside where she sold milk. He then raped and murdered her before dumping her body in the bushes near Namboard. Her forehead had an open wound on it.
23	Lita Mabango	18	16 June	Sipalo stabbed Lita Mabango, a pregnant woman, four times in the chest, fatally strangled her, and hung her by the neck against a NIPA fence.
24	Agness Mwelwa	~22	21 June	Sipalo strangled Mwelwa with a piece of cloth and left her body lying in a bush near a secondary school.
25	Jenny Mwitila Pumulo	20	30 June	Pumulo's corpse was found near a primary school. She had been raped and strangled.
26	?	?	July	
27	?	?	July	
28	?	?	September	
29	Mary Chisanga	?	12 September	After escorting her boyfriend to a railroad station, Chisanga was picked up by Sipalo, who murdered her, mutilated her umbilical, and nearly disemboweled her. Her remains were found off a road between two fitness centres.

== Investigation ==
By the end of January 1980, investigators realized the murders were connected, although they were unsure if they were the work of a lone perpetrator or a gang. They quickly interrogated all known sex offenders and murderers in the area but found no leads. After more murders occurred, the public became more concerned, and the press, as well as politicians, put pressure on the police to capture the perpetrator. In response, they launched "Operation Rosemary." They advised women through newspaper advertisements and posters to be vigilant of strangers offering to escort them. They also implemented a dusk-to-dawn curfew, limiting the movement of people in Lusaka. Additionally, a reward of K 10,000 was offered to anyone with information leading to the arrest of a suspect.

Since the murders continued, the police set up patrols around Lusaka, mostly in areas where Sipalo was known to pick up victims from. They also planted undercover, Lozi-speaking female detectives at bus terminals, although Sipalo never approached them. They also set up a Special Investigation Team (SIT) made up of seasoned detectives around the country.

== Surviving victims ==
=== First surviving victim ===
On the evening of 16 July, a young woman travelling to see her parents in Makeni arrived at the Kamwala bus terminus. She was soon approached by two soldiers, one wearing a combat uniform and the other in a green uniform. Later, the second soldier left, but the one wearing the combat uniform offered to escort the woman to Makeni. Despite her declining the offer, the man picked up her basket containing her belongings, forcing her to follow him. After a while, the two reached a small path, and the man introduced himself as Lieutenant Nyambe. He proceeded to ask her if she could identify him in civilian clothes, to which she replied that she could. Upon hearing this, the soldier pushed her to the ground and started choking her. She managed to kick her attacker off of her, but he then hit her with a spanner. He then told her, "You are the only girl whom I have failed to kill; I have killed the rest, so you are the one who will cause me to be arrested." The attacker hit the woman again and fled the scene.

Three nearby security guards heard the woman's screams and rushed towards her while blowing their whistles. When they reached her, she was still screaming. They took her to a hotel, and she was later transferred to a police station for questioning before receiving a check-up at a local hospital. The woman, and a detective who had seen them together earlier, were able to provide a description of the attacker: a short, brown man dressed in a military uniform who could speak English and Nyanja with a Lozi accent. From this, investigators determined that the perpetrator was either a soldier or a man impersonating a soldier.

=== Second surviving victim ===
On 7 September, a woman left her home in Chingola with her baby and traveled to Lusaka via bus. Along the journey, she became acquainted with a woman traveling to Petauke. After their bus had arrived in Lusaka, they decided to spend the night at the bus terminal, as there were no buses scheduled for either woman's destination until the next morning. A short time later, the women were greeted by two soldiers, who asked the women to show them their national registration cards, to which they obliged. The soldiers attempted to convince the women to spend the night with them at a guest house, but the women declined. However, one of the soldiers carried the Petauke woman's bags with him, so the woman followed him. That woman has never been identified, and it is unknown whether she is alive or another victim.

Approximately one hour later, the other soldier persuaded the other woman by telling her that her acquaintance was sleeping in the guest house. The woman reluctantly agreed and followed him. After 30 minutes of walking, they arrived at a narrow path, and the soldier strangled the woman as she tended to her baby. She woke up hours later, her child crying next to her. Her national registration card had been taken out of her suitcase and placed on her head. The woman's wristwatch and wedding ring had also been stolen. She eventually got help after walking to a nearby house.

== Arrest and death ==
After the attack of the second surviving victim, the police were commanded to confront any soldier loitering at bus and railway stations. On 16 September, the second survivor, accompanied by a detective, went back to the bus station she was lured from to see if her attacker was there. She was soon greeted by Sipalo, who said, "I happen to have seen you somewhere!" The woman said that she had never met him before and that she had recently arrived from Chingola. Sipalo then asked her to accompany him to a guest house, where he would book a room for her. She then saw Sipalo wearing her wristwatch that had been stolen from her during her attack. The woman subsequently alerted nearby police officers, who arrested Sipalo.

One day later, the police searched his home and found items belonging to several of his victims. When confronted about the discovery, Sipalo falsely claimed the items were from a woman he fell in love with. However, he said that he no longer loved the woman after finding out that she had had an operation on her abdomen. The supposed woman took her child to the hospital but left behind her luggage.

Three witnesses, including the two survivors, identified Sipalo as the strangler. When told this by the police, he said, "If they can pick me from the line of others, then I am the one who tried to kill them." That afternoon, Sipalo led officers to locations where he had murdered his victims. He also stated that he had an accomplice, a Lance Corporal. However, the Corporal denied the accusations, and police found no evidence linking him to the murders, so he was released.

On 18 September 1980, while being transferred to an interrogation in the Lusaka Central Police Station, Sipalo escaped the hands of the officers escorting him and fled to the roof of the building, still handcuffed. Despite pleas from the police and fire brigade, Sipalo jumped off the roof in front of a crowd of people, killing himself.

== See also ==
- List of serial killers by country
- List of serial killers by number of victims
