= Bronwyn Harch =

Australian environmental statistician

Bronwyn Delveen Harch (born Bronwyn Christensen in 1969) is an Australian applied statistician, data scientist and higher-education executive known for her work in environmental monitoring, modelling, and transdisciplinary collaboration to address agri-environmental challenges. She was elected as a Fellow of the Australian Academy of Technological Sciences and Engineering (FTSE) in 2014.

== Early life and education ==
Harch was raised in a horticultural farming family in the Lockyer Valley, west of Brisbane, Queensland, Australia.

She completed a Bachelor of Science with First Class Honours in Environmental Studies (Applicable Mathematics) at Griffith University, and a Graduate Diploma in Secondary Teaching (Science and Mathematics) at the Queensland University of Technology. She later completed a PhD in statistics from The University of Queensland, specialising in the application of statistical methods to agricultural and biological systems.

== Career ==
Harch began her research career at the Commonwealth Scientific and Industrial Research Organisation (CSIRO) in 1995 as a postdoctoral research statistician. She served as Chief of Mathematics, Informatics and Statistics and Deputy Director of the Sustainable Agriculture Flagship.

In 2014, Harch joined the Queensland University of Technology (QUT), where she held research leadership roles including Executive Director of the Institute for Future Environments. During this period, she contributed to transdisciplinary research programs and co-led the establishment of the Food Agility Cooperative Research Centre.

She was appointed Deputy Vice-Chancellor (Research and Innovation) at The University of Queensland in 2018. Harch served as interim Queensland Chief Scientist from October 2022 until Kerrie Wilson was appointed to the role in early August 2023.

In 2023, she was appointed Vice President (Industry and External Engagement) at Griffith University.

Harch specializes in environmental statistics, data mining, and agri-environmental informatics, applying statistical and computational methods to the analysis of agricultural, environmental, and natural resource data. Her research focuses on the use of large-scale datasets to inform environmental and agricultural management. Harch served as President of the International Environmetrics Society from 2013 to 2015 and was later named an Honorary Editor of its journal Environmetrics. She has held advisory and governance roles with a range of Australian and international scientific, environmental, and innovation organizations, including Industry Innovation and Science Australia, the Future Drought Fund, AgResearch New Zealand, the Queensland Museum Network, the Great Barrier Reef Foundation, and Australian Pork Limited.

== Honours and awards ==
- Elected as a member of the International Statistical Institute (2008).
- Received the ICT Outstanding Achievement Award and ICT Professional Award from Women in Technology Queensland (2010).
- Elected a Fellow of the Australian Academy of Technological Science and Engineering (2013).
- Inducted into the Hall of Fame of Ipswich Girls Grammar School (2015).
- Elected a Fellow of the Queensland Academy of Arts and Sciences (2017).
- Received Griffith University’s Outstanding Alumnus Award (2023).
- Named among the top 60 Australian statisticians by the Statistical Society of Australia (2023).
