= Rhodes Park School =

Location
- Sibweni Road, Northmead; Lusaka; Zambia

Information
- Motto: Let there be light
- Established: 1965
- Founder: Mwansa and Lydia Folotiya
- Principal: Mr Keegan Kamuchungu
- Grades: preschool - 12
- Campus: Sibweni
- Website: Rhodes Park School

Rhodes Park School is a private school for boys and girls in Lusaka, Zambia.
