= Mass gathering medicine =

Field of medicine

Mass gathering medicine, also known as event medicine, crowd medicine or mass gathering health, is a field of medicine that explores the health effects/risks of mass gatherings and the strategies that contribute positively to effective health services delivery during these events. The reason for the development of the field of medicine gives the fact that mass gatherings generate a higher incidence of injury and illness, may be the subject to a catastrophic accident or attack with large numbers of injured or dead persons.

Mass Gathering Medicine is viewed as a niche field of prehospital care in emergency medicine at the University of British Columbia.

Among factors influencing on the demand for the health care at mass gatherings are:

- the weather,
- duration of the event,
- if the crowd moves,
- containment of the event (fenced/contained or not),
- availability of alcohol/drugs,
- the density of the crowd et al.,
- possibility for spreading of communicable diseases

Key purposes of Mass Gathering Medical Services at an event are:

- rapid access to the injured or ill patients,
- effective stabilizing and transporting injured or ill patients,
- on-site care for minor injuries and illnesses.

The Department of Global Alert and Response of the World Health Organization supports Member States hosting mass gatherings. As the acknowledgement of growth in the area of Mass Gathering Medicine, there is a need for consistency in the research and evaluation of mass gathering events. This is important because mass gatherings may impact on health services and having a collective understanding of the impact of mass gatherings on health services may mitigate any poor outcomes for patients.

Mass gathering medicine support requires planning in advance.

Medical journal The Lancet held a conference on Mass Gathering Medicine in October 2010 in the Kingdom of Saudi Arabia.

In 2015, This Is Life with Lisa Ling filmed an episode featuring mass-gathering medicine with event medical specialists Dr. Andrew Bazos and Connor Fitzpatrick of CrowdRx, Inc.

The inaugural Mass Gathering Medicine Summit was held in New York City on April 21–22, 2016. The fourth annual Mass Gathering Medical Summit was held in Las Vegas on March 15–16, 2019.
