= French School of Lusaka =

- Lycée Français de Lusaka
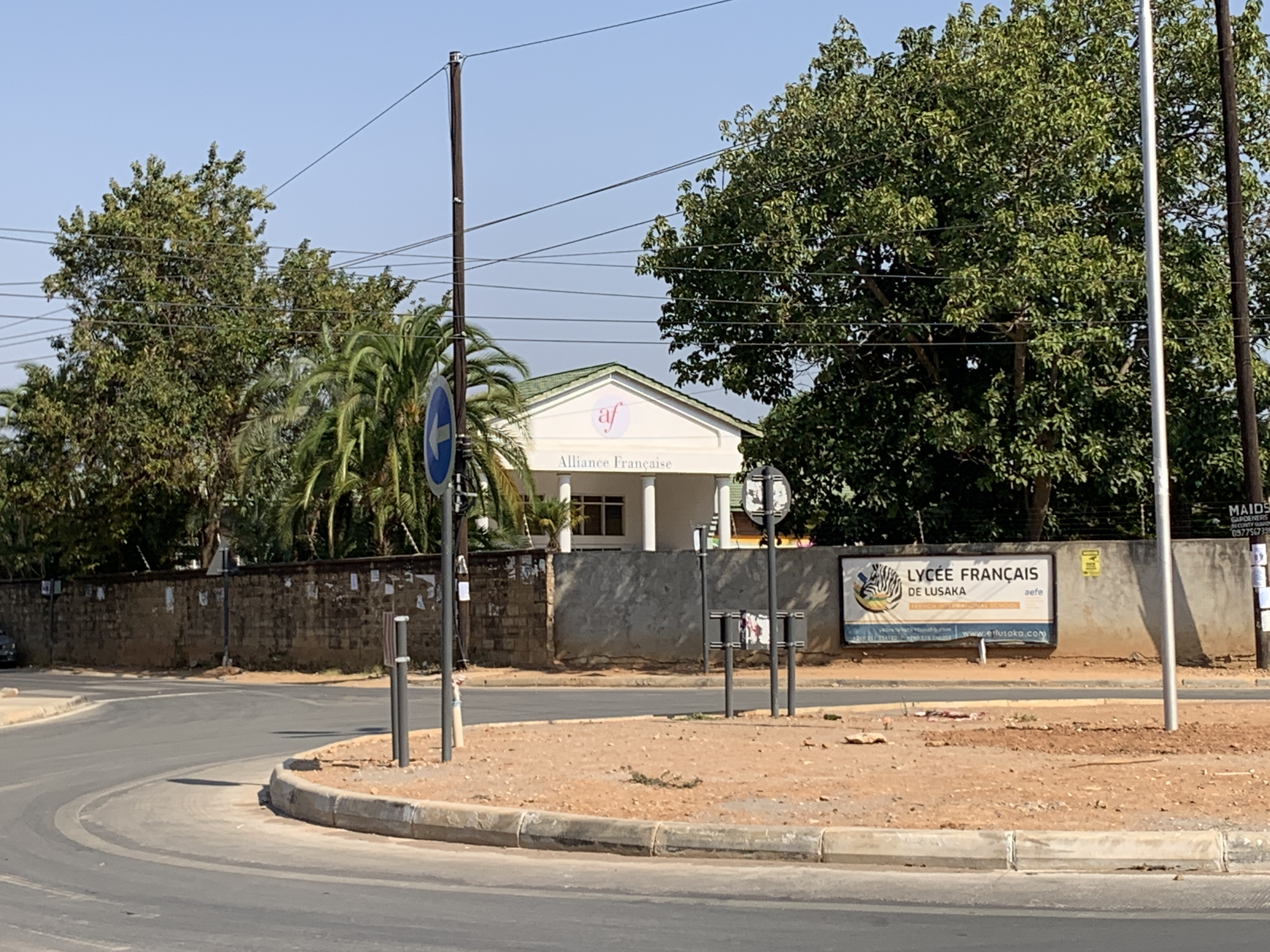

Location
- Alick Nkhata Avenue, Longacres - - Lusaka - Zambia; Lusaka; Zambia
- Coordinates: 15.4128°S 28.3198°E

Information
- Type: Private
- Opened: 1980
- Campus: 1
- Website: eflusaka.com

French School of Lusaka (French: Lycée Français de Lusaka, formerly École française Champollion de Lusaka) is a French international school on the property of the Alliance française campus in Longacres, Lusaka, Zambia. The Embassy of France in Zambia and French families campaigned to have the school established; it opened in 1980 and moved to its current site in September 2005. The school serves preschool through CM2, and using the National Centre for Distance Education (CNED) distance education programme it also serves collège (junior high school) and lycée (senior high school/sixth form) until terminale (final year).
