= European and Developing Countries Clinical Trials Partnership =

Partnership

The European and Developing Countries Clinical Trials Partnership (EDCTP) is a long-running initiative linking European and African countries to fund and coordinate clinical research on infectious diseases in sub-Saharan Africa. Since its establishment in 2003, the programme has operated across three successive phases, each with a distinct legal form and expanded scope. The current phase, known as Global Health EDCTP3, has operated as a European Union Joint Undertaking since 2021.

== Background and rationale ==
In the early 2000s, the European Commission identified a significant gap between the scale of research investment directed at infectious diseases prevalent in wealthy countries and the comparatively small resources devoted to diseases disproportionately affecting sub-Saharan Africa; particularly HIV/AIDS, tuberculosis, and malaria.

In response, the European Council endorsed a Programme for Action on HIV/AIDS, malaria and tuberculosis in May 2001. The Council of the EU and the European Parliament jointly adopted the founding decision establishing EDCTP in June 2003, under Article 169 of the EC Treaty (later renumbered Article 185 of the Treaty on the Functioning of the European Union).

== History ==
=== EDCTP1 (2003–2015) ===
The first phase was constituted as a European Economic Interest Grouping (EEIG) and brought together EU member states, Norway, and Switzerland alongside sub-Saharan African partners. Its initial budget was €600 million for the period 2003–2007, shared between the European Union, participating member states, and third parties including industry and charitable foundations.

Activities concentrated on phase II and III clinical trials in sub-Saharan Africa for HIV/AIDS, tuberculosis, and malaria, accompanied by capacity-building measures such as training, infrastructure upgrades at clinical trial sites, and support for ethics and regulatory frameworks. The programme also established the Pan African Clinical Trials Registry (PACTR), which subsequently became a WHO Primary Clinical Trials Registry.

A mid-term and final external evaluation of EDCTP1 identified both significant achievements and structural weaknesses, including insufficient integration of African partners in programme governance and a heavy concentration of funded activities in a small number of countries.

=== EDCTP2 (2014–2026) ===
A second phase was established under a revised Article 185 decision and implemented by the EDCTP Association, a legal entity created to give African and European member countries a formal role in programme governance. The scope broadened beyond the original three diseases to encompass neglected tropical diseases, emerging and re-emerging infectious diseases, and other poverty-related conditions prevalent in sub-Saharan Africa.

EDCTP2 also introduced emergency response mechanisms. Dedicated calls for proposals were launched in response to the Ebola outbreak (2018) and the COVID-19 pandemic (2020).

=== Global Health EDCTP3 (2021–present) ===
The third phase came into operation in 2021 under a new legal basis, established as a Joint Undertaking under Article 187 of the Treaty on the Functioning of the European Union and embedded within the EU's Horizon Europe research and innovation framework. This represented a significant change in legal status: unlike its predecessors, Global Health EDCTP3 operates as a fully autonomous EU body with its own budget and legal personality. The programme achieved full financial autonomy in November 2023.

The programme's projected total budget for 2021–2031 is approximately €1.84 billion, comprising contributions from the European Union (around €890 million), EDCTP Association member states (approximately €550 million), and third-party contributing partners (up to €400 million).

== Scope and activities ==
Across all three phases, EDCTP has funded clinical research, researcher training, and health system strengthening in sub-Saharan Africa. Priority diseases have included HIV/AIDS, tuberculosis, malaria, neglected tropical diseases, and — since the third phase — antimicrobial resistance, epidemic preparedness, and the intersection of climate change with infectious disease.

Funding is allocated through competitive open calls for proposals. Projects are required to involve both European and sub-Saharan African partners, with an emphasis on locally driven research that meets the highest ethical and regulatory standards.

== Cumulative results (2003–present) ==
Across more than two decades of operation, EDCTP-supported research has contributed to the development or evaluation of several medical interventions that have subsequently reached patients.

Notable examples include:

- The malaria vaccines RTS,S/AS01 (which received a positive opinion from the European Medicines Agency) and R21/Matrix-M.
- The first paediatric HIV treatment formulations (Triomune Baby/Junior)
- New oral treatments for human African trypanosomiasis (sleeping sickness): fexinidazole and acoziborole.
- A paediatric treatment for schistosomiasis (arpraziquantel)
- The first paediatric formulation for newborns and young infants (Coartem Baby)

Beyond specific products, the programme has supported over 700 research and capacity development grants, more than 600 clinical studies, fellowship awards to over 300 researchers from sub-Saharan Africa, and training for more than 2,000 individuals from the region. Ethics and regulatory capacity has been strengthened in 37 sub-Saharan African countries. Four Regional Networks of Excellence have been established.

== Governance ==
The EDCTP programme is currently in its third phase, the Global Health EDCTP3, which is governed through a structure that brings together the European Union and participating European and African countries, with the latter acting collectively through a dedicated intergovernmental body.

Global Health EDCTP3 is the current funding programme. As a Joint Undertaking, it holds its own legal personality, separate from both the European Commission and the EDCTP Association. Its highest decision-making body is the Governing Board, in which the European Commission and the EDCTP Association sit as equal partners, each holding an equal vote. Two independent advisory bodies provide scientific and strategic guidance to the Governing Board: a Scientific Committee of expert researchers and a Stakeholders' Group representing civil society, industry, and research institutions. Day-to-day operations are managed by a Programme Office based in Brussels, led by an Executive Director.

The European Union provides the largest share of the programme's funding, contributed through the EU budget under Horizon Europe. The European Commission represents the Union in all formal governance roles, acting as one of the two equal members of the Global Health EDCTP3 Governing Board.

Participating countries, both European and African, contribute financially and in kind to the programme, as members of the EDCTP Association . Their individual national research investments are expected to align with the programme's shared Strategic Research and Innovation Agenda. Their collective role is formally channelled through the EDCTP Association.

The EDCTP Association is a separate legal entity composed of more than 45 European and African countries. It was originally established to implement the second phase of the programme (EDCTP2) and has since evolved into the co-governing partner of Global Health EDCTP3 alongside the European Commission. The Association's governing body is its General Assembly, made up of institutions formally mandated by member governments; the European Commission, the African Union, and the World Health Organization participate as observers. The Association also maintains an Africa Office that carries out activities best managed from the African continent, supported through a dedicated Global Health EDCTP3 grant.
