= Kasama College of Education =

Kasama College of Education (KACE)
- Motto: Work Whilst It's Day
- Type: Government
- Established: 1966
- Location: Kasama, Zambia
- Campus: Urban

Kasama College of Education (KACE) is a Zambian teacher training college situated in Kasama District, the provincial headquarters of Northern Province. The college is about three kilometers from the Kasama Central Business District, and is owned by the Zambian government through the Ministry of Higher Education.

== History ==
The college was opened in 1966. Originally it was called Kasama Teachers’ Training College (KTTC) until 2000 when all government-owned teacher training colleges were renamed colleges of education. From its inception the college has had 14 principals, with only two women having served as principal. Below in the lineage of principals from its inception to date:

1. Gaobepe Reams 1966–1970
2. Mushemi Mushemi 1970
3. Aaron William Mulenga 1971–1979
4. Lyton Bwalanda 1979–1986
5. M. Simwinga 1986–1987
6. S.W. Chanda 1987–1994
7. Bruno Munyano 1994–1996
8. F.L. Musonda 1996–1998
9. Felix Bwalya Chanda 1998–2001
10. F.J. Kapembwa 2001–2005
11. M.M. Mushika 2005–2009
12. E.N. Zulu (Mrs) 2009–2010
13. Morris Mulundano 2010–2011
14. Oscar Ntenga 2011–2012 (acting)
15. Andrew T. Mutobo 2012-2016
16. Florence A. Masanzi 2016–present

== Courses ==
The college previously offered certificate courses for primary school teachers such as the Primary Teachers’ Certificate, Zambia Basic Education and the Zambia Teacher Education Course. ZATEC was the last certificate course to be offered by the college until 2012 when it was phased out. From 2012 the college introduced the Primary Teachers’ Diploma which is a three-year diploma programme underwritten by the University of Zambia. In the same year the college introduced the Primary Teachers’ Diploma by Distance Learning, an in-service distance education programme. 2014 has seen the introduction of Early Childhood Education programme and the Secondary Teachers’ Diploma Science and Mathematics.
