= Mass gathering =

Event attended by a significant number of people

Mass gatherings are events attended by a sufficient number of people to strain the planning and response resources of the host community, state/province, nation, or region where it is being held. Definitions of a mass gathering generally include the following:

- Planned (long term or spontaneously planned) event
- “a specified number of persons (at least >1000 persons).
- at a specific location, for a specific purpose (e.g. social function, public event, sporting event) for a defined period of time”.
- Requires Multi-Agency Coordination

Mass gatherings are usually sporting events (such as Olympic Games) or religious pilgrimages (such as Kumbh Mela or Arba'een Pilgrimage). They are highly visible and in some cases, millions of people attend them.

== Statistics ==
Here is some Statistics about the latest mass gatherings in the world:

2022:

July: Hajj in Mecca: 1 million

September: Arba'een Pilgrimage in Karbala: 21 million

2020-2021:

No more mass gathering due to COVID-19

2020:

January: Qasem Soleimani's funeral in Tehran: 7 million

2019:

January: Kumbh Mela in Allahabad: 14 million

February: Kumbh Mela in Allahabad: 50 million

August: Hajj in Mecca: 2.5 million

October: Arba'een Pilgrimage in Karbala: 18 million

Mass Gathering Medicine is a new field of medicine that focuses on the health risks of mass gatherings. The World Health Organization through its "Department of Global Alert and Response" supports Member States hosting mass gatherings and regularly receives a large number of requests for technical support by countries organizing large mass gatherings.

== See also ==
- Flash mob
- List of largest peaceful gatherings
- Mass movement
- Protests
