= Jean Nachega =

Congolese-American physician and academic

- Education: University of Cape Town; London School of Hygiene and Tropical Medicine; Facultes Universitaires Notre Dame de la Paix; Catholic University of Leuven; Harvard School of Public Health; Johns Hopkins Bloomberg School of Public Health
- Scientific career
- Workplaces: University of Pittsburgh; Stellenbosch University
- Thesis: Antiretroviral therapy adherence and effectiveness in a private sector disease management programme in Southern Africa (2008)

Jean Nachega is a Congolese American physician who is an Associate Professor of Medicine at the University of Pittsburgh. He is an infectious diseases doctor with a focus on improving the public health outcomes of people infected with HIV/AIDS. He is a Fellow of the African Academy of Sciences.

== Early life and education ==
Nachega was born in the Democratic Republic of the Congo. He completed his undergraduate studies at the Facultes Universitaires Notre Dame de la Paix in Belgium. He moved to the Catholic University of Leuven for his medical degree. He returned to the Democratic Republic of the Congo, where he completed his clinical rotation in Kinshasa. After earning his medical degree, Nachega moved to the Johns Hopkins Bloomberg School of Public Health, where he completed a Masters of Public Health. Nachega moved to the London School of Hygiene and Tropical Medicine to study for a Diploma in Tropical Medicine and Hygiene, which he completed in 2000. He earned a doctorate at the University of Cape Town in 2009. His doctoral research considered antiretroviral therapy adherence and effectiveness.

== Research and career ==
Nachega's career is in infectious diseases and epidemiology, with a focus on HIV. He has shown that adherence to non-nucleoside reverse-transcriptase inhibitor HIV therapy has a linear dose-response pattern. He was elected to the African Academy of Sciences in 2018. In 2020, he was awarded $130 million as part of the National Institutes of Health Medical Education Partnership Initiative (MEPI)'s President's Emergency Plan for AIDS Relief. The program partnered with the African Forum for Research and Education in Health to strengthen medical school curricula and increased the number of graduates who would work in remote locations. Alongside improving awareness and treatment for HIV, Nachega has argued that Africa has to prepare to protect people from chronic diseases that will occur with aging, such as cardiovascular disease and cancer. In 2025, he was inducted into theAcadémie Congolaise des Sciences (ACCOS), the Congolese Academy of Sciences.

== Selected publications ==
- Edward J Mills; Jean B Nachega; Iain Buchan; et al. (1 August 2006). "Adherence to antiretroviral therapy in sub-Saharan Africa and North America: a meta-analysis". JAMA. 296 (6): 679–690. doi:10.1001/jama.296.6.679. ISSN 0098-7484. PMID 16896111. Wikidata Q36560027.
- Edward J Mills; Jean B Nachega; David R Bangsberg; et al. (November 2006). "Adherence to HAART: a systematic review of developed and developing nation patient-reported barriers and facilitators". PLOS Medicine. 3 (11): e438. doi:10.1371/journal.pmed.0030438. ISSN 1549-1277. PMC 1637123. PMID 17121449. Wikidata Q28469073.
- Jean B Nachega; Olalekan A Uthman; Jean Anderson; et al. (1 October 2012). "Adherence to antiretroviral therapy during and after pregnancy in low-income, middle-income, and high-income countries: a systematic review and meta-analysis". AIDS. 26 (16): 2039–2052. doi:10.1097/qad.0b013e328359590f. ISSN 0269-9370. PMC 5061936. PMID 22951634. Wikidata Q37335159.
