= Baobab College =

School in Lusaka, Zambia

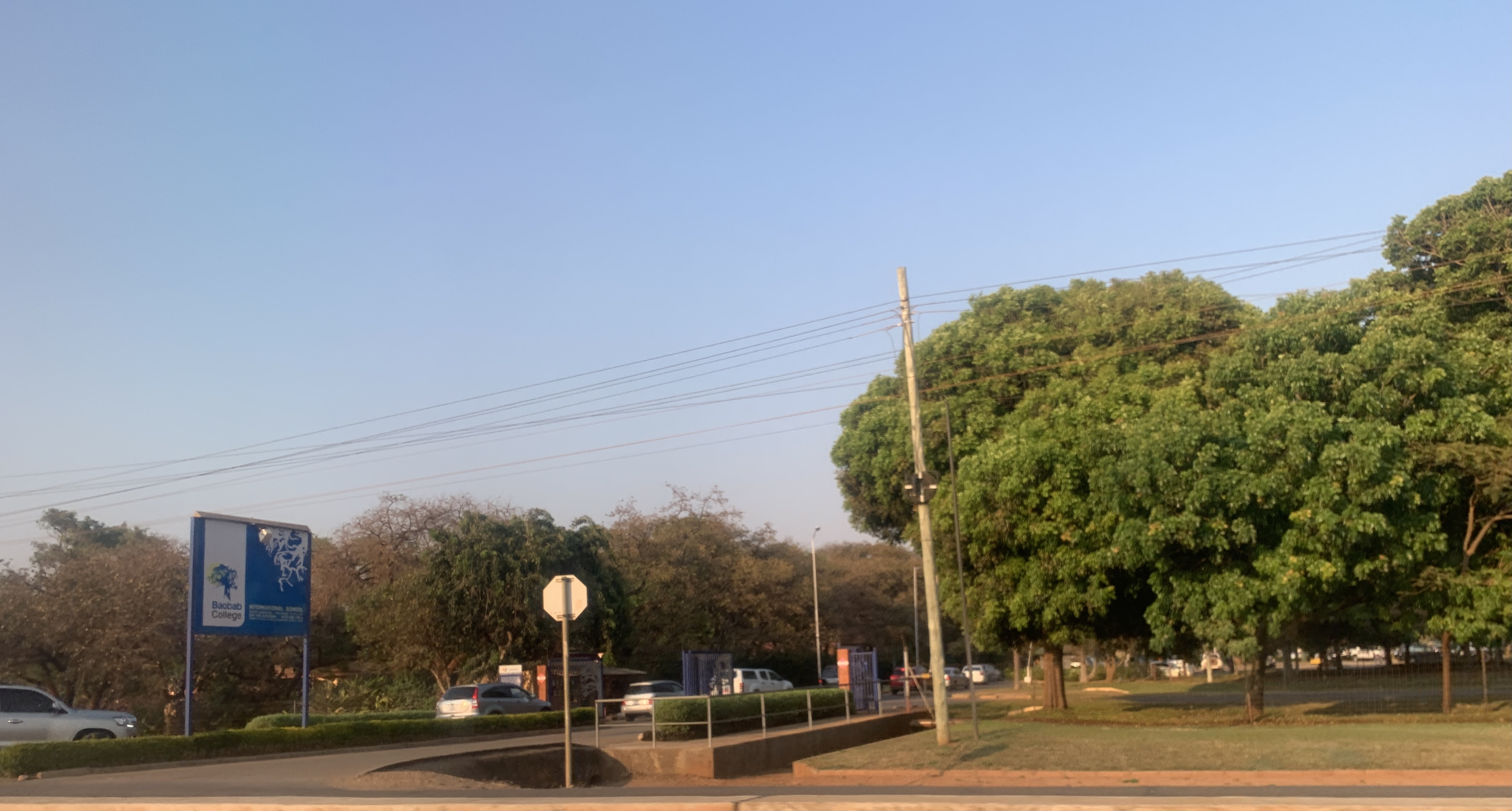

Location
- Chilanga; Zambia; 15.50611°S 28.25821°E

Information
- Former name: Baobab Trust School
- Type: Day/boarding
- Established: 1994
- Head teacher: Trudie Masterson
- Age range: 2–18
- Enrollment: 670
- Website: baobabcollege.org

Baobab College (formerly Baobab Trust School) is an independent day and boarding school situated south of Lusaka in Zambia.
