= Academy of Sciences Malaysia =

Government organization in Kuala Lumpur, Malaysia

Coordinates: 3°10′43.8″N 101°39′59.9″E

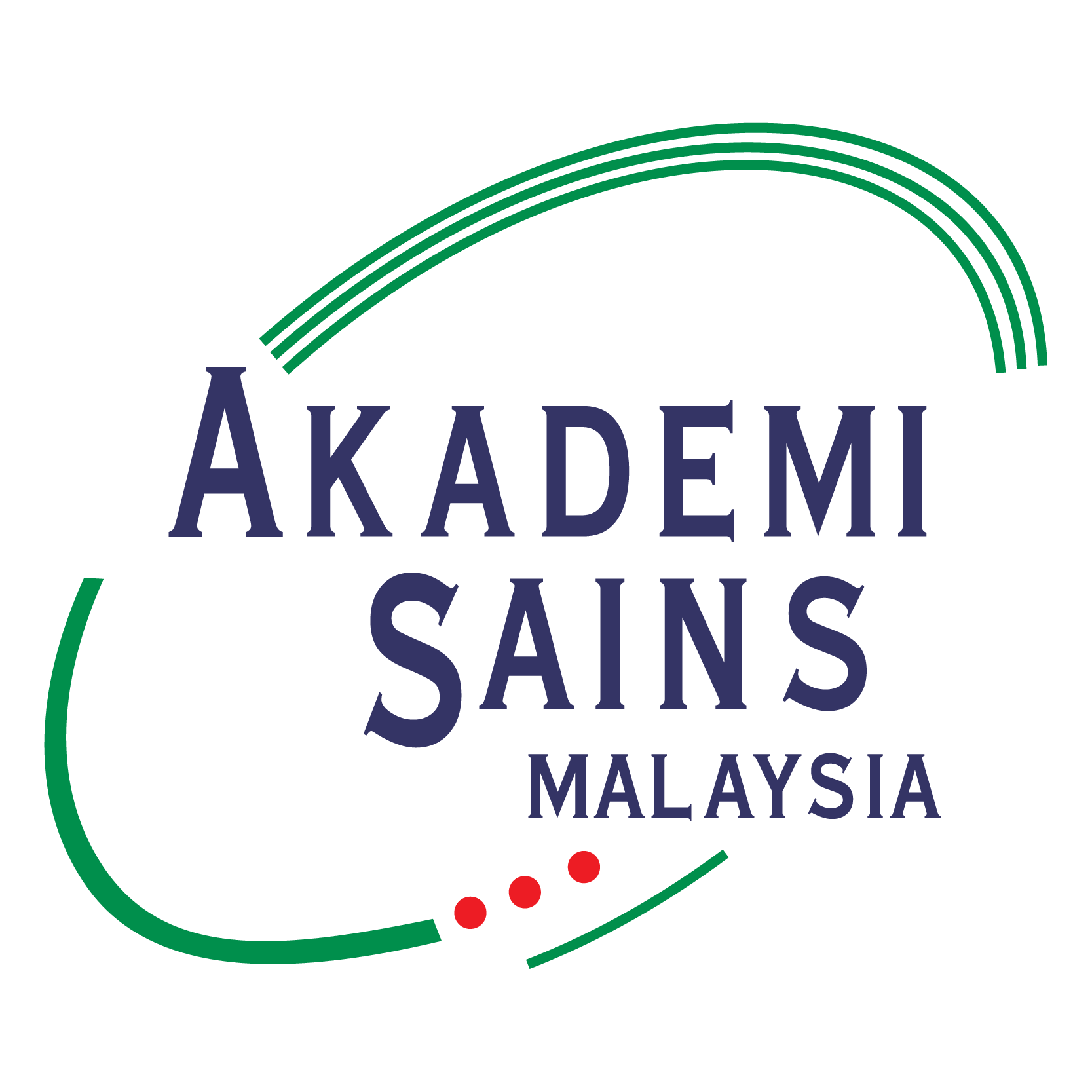

Agency overview
- Formed: 1 February 1995 (30 years ago)
- Jurisdiction: Government of Malaysia
- Headquarters: 20th Floor, West Wing MATRADE Tower, Jalan Sultan Haji Ahmad Shah off, Jalan Tuanku Abdul Halim, 50480 Kuala Lumpur
- Employees: 80
- Parent department: Ministry of Science, Technology and Innovation (Malaysia)

The Academy of Sciences Malaysia (Malay: Akademi Sains Malaysia) is a statutory body in the Malaysian government established under an act of Parliament (Academy of Sciences Malaysia Act 1994). The Academy, abbreviated as ASM, is the highest scientific advisory body of Malaysia, and is organizationally under the Ministry of Science, Technology and Innovation (MOSTI).

Its purpose is to be the ‘Think Tank’ of Malaysia for matters related to science, engineering, technology and innovation, and to pursue excellence in the fields of science, engineering and technology. The Academy consists (as of 2023) of 450 Fellows in eight science disciplines. For the year 2024 - 2025, the President is YM Academician Datuk Dr Tengku Mohd Azzman Shariffadeen and the Vice President is Academician Distinguished Professor Datuk Dr Looi Lai Meng.

== History ==
In 1995, ASM was established under the “Academy of Sciences Malaysia Act 1994” with 50 Foundation Fellows.

The Academy's first office was located in Jalan Tun Ismail, Kuala Lumpur, part of historical remains from the British Colonial era in Kuala Lumpur. The office serves as the administration center of the Academy and as a meeting place for ASM Council and its various committees.

In 2013, ASM moved its main office to Menara MATRADE at Jalan Sultan Haji Ahmad Shah, Kuala Lumpur. The new office, located on Level 14 & 20, serves as the administration office, publications library, meeting venue, and place of gathering. The office in Jalan Tun Ismail remains operational, and hosts two regional offices: International Science, Technology and Innovation Centre for South – South Cooperation (ISTIC-UNESCO), and International Science Council – Regional Office for Asia and the Pacific (ISC ROAP).

== Activities ==
ASM provides independent input on science, technology and innovation, or STI, and advice on STI related issues of national and international importance. As of 2018, its products include reports on strategic foresight towards Progressive Malaysia 2050, sustainability science, emerging technology, and socio-economics.

ASM is the national selection body for Malaysian scientists to participate in international programs such as Lindau Nobel Laureate Meetings, and CERN Summer Student Program. The Academy is also one of the delivery partners of the Newton-Ungku Omar Fund, the Malaysian branch of the Newton Fund. ASM launched the Top Research Scientists Malaysia in 2012 as online database of the nation's scientists. It established the Young Scientists Network – Academy of Sciences Malaysia as a platform to promote career in science. It conducts the National Science Challenge, an annual science competition for secondary school students where the champions win a chance for a study trip in Stockholm, Sweden and attend the Nobel Prize Ceremony.

In 2012, ASM began the Inquiry Based Science Education (IBSE) initiative by training IBSE to primary school teachers, developed from the La Main A La Pate (LAMAP) model developed by French Academy of Sciences.

Since 2015, the Academy is also involved in setting up the country's National STEM Centre as a professional development centre for STEM teachers and lab technicians using IBSE approach.

== Awards ==
In 2004, ASM launched the Mahathir Science Award, in honour of Mahathir Mohamad (Malaysia's 4th Prime Minister and an Honorary Fellow of the Academy). The award is given for breakthroughs in the fields of Tropical Agriculture, Tropical Architecture & Engineering, Tropical Medicine, and Tropical Natural Resources. In 2010, the Mahathir Science Award Foundation (MSAF) was set up to manage and oversee this award.

Since 2005, ASM is a collaborator of the annual MAKNA Cancer Research Award. The research grant by Majlis Kanser Nasional is awarded to young Malaysian researchers. Through 2018, a total of 53 researchers have been awarded the grant.

== Organisation ==
The Academy is governed by a Council of 16 comprising the President, Vice President, Secretary General, Treasurer, and twelve other members who are all Fellows.

The President is appointed by Yang Di-Pertuan Agong, the King of Malaysia, on the recommendation of the Minister of Energy, Science, Technology, Environment and Climate Change.

- 1st President (1995 – 2001): Academician Emeritus Professor Tan Sri Datuk Dr Omar Abdul Rahman
- 2nd President (2001 – 2007): Tan Sri Datuk Dr Ahmad Zaharudin Idrus
- 3rd President (2007 – 2010): Academician Tan Sri Datuk Dr Yusof Basiron
- 4th President (2010 – 2016): Academician Tan Sri Datuk Ir Dr Ahmad Tajuddin Ali
- 5th President (2018 – 2022): Professor Datuk Dr Asma Ismail
- 6th President (Present): YM Academician Datuk Dr Tengku Mohd Azzman Shariffadeen

The council is made up of the President, Vice President, Secretary General and Treasurer and twelve other members all of whom are Fellows.

== Members ==
Membership of ASM consists of Malaysia's top scientists in science, engineering, technology and innovation.

== Fellow ==
A Fellow of the Academy is entitled to use the title ‘Fellow of the Academy of Sciences Malaysia’ with the abbreviation FASc, after their name. To date, ASM has 353 Fellows. At the establishment of ASM in 1995, 50 individuals were appointed as Foundation Fellows. Subsequent Fellows have been elected at the annual general meeting.

Fellows of ASM are divided into eight disciplines. Number in each discipline (as of 2023):
1. Biological, Agricultural and Environmental Sciences: 90 Fellows
2. Chemical Sciences : 53 Fellows
3. Engineering Sciences: 89 Fellows
4. Information Technology & Computer Sciences: 25 Fellows
5. Mathematics, Physics & Earth Sciences: 51 Fellows
6. Medical & Health Sciences: 75 Fellows
7. Science & Technology Development Industry: 49 Fellows
8. Social Sciences & Humanities: 18 Fellows

== Honorary Fellow ==
An Honorary Fellow is a person who has made or is making a distinguished contribution to the practice of science, engineering or technology that will benefit the work of the Academy. Honorary Fellows are elected at the Academy's annual general meeting.

To date, the Academy has appointed five Honorary Fellows:

- Tun Dr Mahathir Mohamad
- Tun Dr Abdullah Ahmad Badawi
- Tun Ahmad Sarji Abdul Hamid
- Nobel Laureate Professor Lee Yuan Tseh
- YB Tan Sri Dato’ Seri Law Hieng Ding

== Senior Fellow ==
The Council appoints Senior Fellows from among Fellows of the Academy.

Their appointment is based on the recommendation of a special panel comprising members and non-members of the Academy who are appointed by the Minister of Energy, Science, Technology, Environment, and Climate Change. A Senior Fellow is entitled to be addressed as an ‘Academician’. To date, there are 28 Senior Fellows.

== Associates ==
Associates of ASM are appointed by the council for a two-year term to represent ASM at external meetings, contribute and involve in various studies and committees. Current number of ASM Associates is 39 (in 2018).
