= Mahathir Science Award =

National award foundation in Malaysia

The Mahathir Science Award is an award for outstanding contributions in science and technology that address issues related to the tropics. The Foundation was established 17 August 2004 in honour of the former Prime Minister of Malaysia Mahathir Mohamad. It is presented by the Mahathir Science Award Foundation.

== Award-winners ==
- Alimuddin Zumla
- Hugh Possingham
- Kerrie Wilson
- Erik Meijaard
- Rita R. Colwell
- Alan Cowman
- Yuan Longping
