= Ndola Girls Technical High School =

Technical high school in Ndola, Zambia

Ndola Girls Technical High School also known as Ndola Girls Technical Secondary School, Ndola Girls STEM school and Ndotech is located in Ndola, Zambia, near the Dag Hammarskjöld Crash Site Memorial. The school was officially opened in 2008. In 2021 the school was ranked third among girls' school in Zambia in the results of the grade 12 examinations, with a 100% pass rate and 50% of students gaining six points.

== History ==
Construction of the school began in 2005 and was planned to be completed in 2006.
