= Kamwala Secondary School =

Coordinates: 15°25′58″S 28°17′46″E

Location
- Chilimbulu Road; Lusaka; Zambia

Information
- Type: Government
- Motto: Non Sibi Sed Alis
- Grades: 10 - 12
- Enrollment: 800+
- Campus: 1

Kamwala Secondary School, also known as Kamwala High School (previously known as Prince Philip High School) is a high school located in Lusaka, Zambia.

== History ==
During Northern Rhodesian times, the school was known as Prince Philip Secondary School, and was the only school for Asian students. At the time, its hostels (dormitories) were some of the highest buildings in the city. It has since developed into a multiracial, multicultural school, with Christian, Hindu, and Muslim students.

== Notable alumni ==
- Professor Sir Alimuddin Zumla, London-based professor of medicine
- Ljubomir Sindžirević, Serbia, graduated Civil Engineer, well known for his career in Project Management, Project Planning, strong ties with Primavera software, worked in Shell, United Nations University of Peace, WorleyParsons, Fluor Daniel, PDO (Oman), Lukoil, Union Engineering etc. Born on 10 July 1953. Studied in Kamwala (then Prince Philip) Secondary School from 27 July 1968 till 20 July 1969. Currently living in Muscat, Oman (April 2020).
