= David Kaunda Technical High School =

David Kaunda National STEM Secondary School
- Lusaka; Zambia

Information
- Type: Government
- Motto: Diligence and Dignity
- Established: 1934; 92 years ago
- Grades: 8 - 12
- Enrollment: 800 - 1,100
- Campus: 1
- Colors: white black green

David Kaunda National STEM Secondary School, previously Hodgson Technical College, is a government boarding school in Zambia situated in woodlands Prospects Hill or main off Burma Road, along Yotamu Muleya Road. The school was initially founded in the year 1934. The school was erected by students and was named after the father to the first republican President of Zambia Reverend David Kaunda who was a missionary and teacher from Nyasaland (now Malawi). As of January 2022, the school is currently headed by Ms. Maureen Mwape Tonga.

== History ==
David Kaunda National Technical Secondary School was founded in 1934 as Hodgson Training School by the British Colonial Government, with Mr. F. Hodgson as the first principal. It was opened to meet the needs of children of soldiers of the Northern Rhodesia Regiment as a Trades School under the name Hodgson Training School to provide a variety of courses including carpentry, plumbing, brick-laying, metal craft, metal work and leather work.

The school's name was changed to David Kaunda Secondary Technical School to offer senior secondary school education up to the 'A' levels in 1965. It was a boys school until 1993, when the school opened its doors to the first girls and has hitherto been a co-education boarding school. In 1995, the first grade 12 girl students graduated.

In 1999, the school's name, David Kaunda Secondary Technical School, was changed to David Kaunda National Technical High School, and then subsequently changed to David Kaunda National Technical Secondary in 2014 to reflect the acceptance of Grade 8s following the abolishment of basic and high schools.

== Selection ==
David Kaunda National Technical High School only attracts gifted high performing pupils across Zambia. Successful candidates who are selected to the prestigious school are those who have just completed their Junior secondary school education from all of Zambia's10 provinces. Priority at selection is given to those who wish to pursue studies in science and technical fields such as Engineering and Medicine.

== Notable alumni ==
- Emmerson Mnangagwa, Zimbabwean politician; current President of Zimbabwe (expelled)
