= Linda Secondary School =

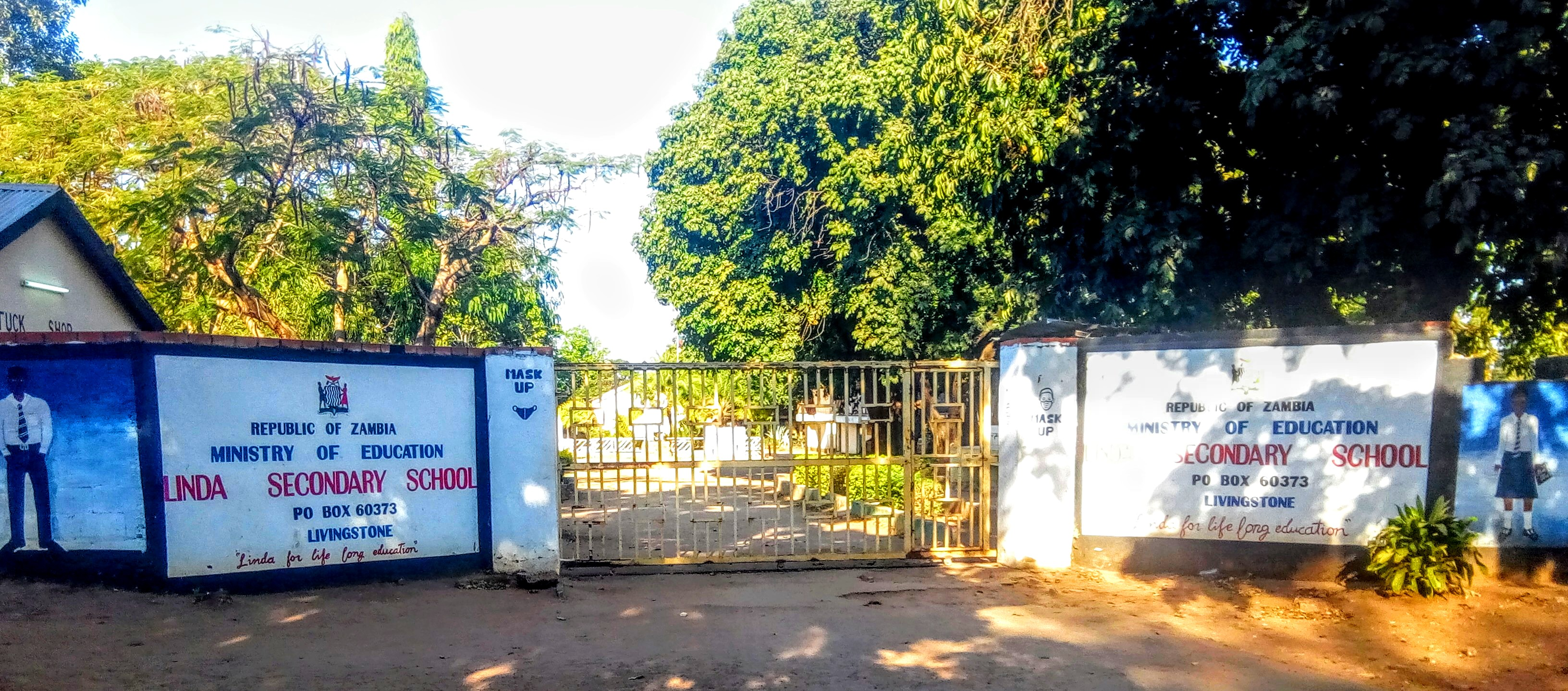
- Linda Secondary School, 2022

Location
- Livingstone; Zambia
- 17°51′S 25°52′E

Information
- Type: Government
- Opened: 1963; 63 years ago
- Grades: 8 - 12
- Enrollment: approx. 400+
- Campus: 1
- Colors: Navy Blue; White

Linda Secondary School is a government school in Livingstone, Zambia. It was established in 1963. The school is about two kilometers (1.2 mi) south-east of the Livingstone city centre. The school is known for winning the 2016 Copa Coca-Cola football tournament in Zambia.
