= Emmerson Mnangagwa =

President of Zimbabwe since 2017

His Excellency The Honourable Emmerson Mnangagwa MEOPA GCZM
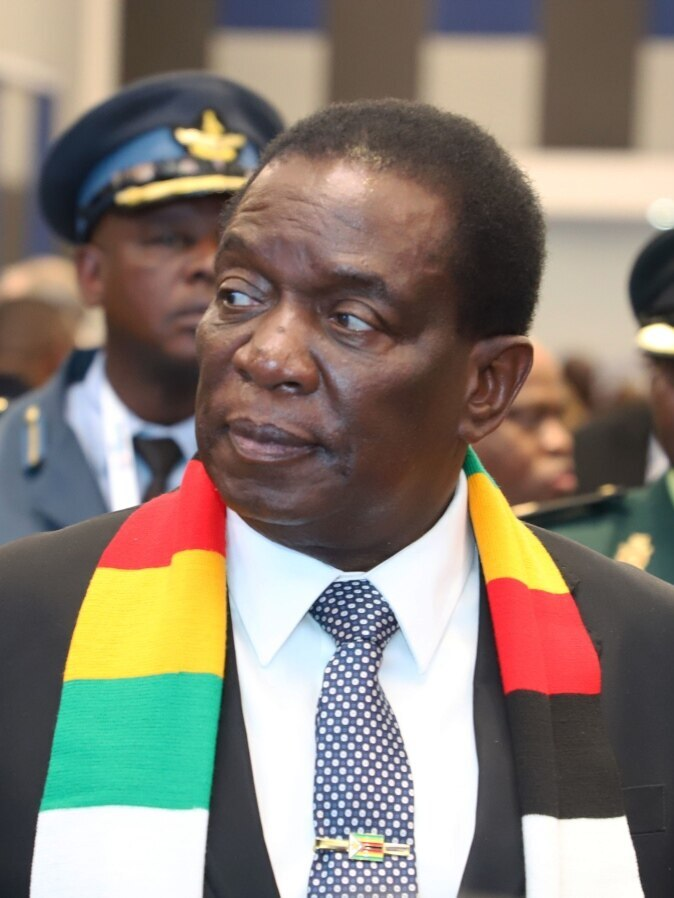
- Mnangagwa in 2023

3rd President of Zimbabwe
- Incumbent
- Assumed office 24 November 2017
- Vice President: First Vice-President; Constantino Chiwenga; Second Vice-President; Kembo Mohadi^{[nb]}
- Preceded by: Phelekezela Mphoko (acting); Robert Mugabe

First Secretary of ZANU-PF
- Incumbent
- Assumed office 19 November 2017
- Second Secretaries: Constantino Chiwenga; Kembo Mohadi
- Preceded by: Robert Mugabe

Chairman of Southern African Development Community
- In office 17 August 2024 – 17 August 2025
- Preceded by: João Lourenço
- Succeeded by: Andry Rajoelina

4th First Vice-President of Zimbabwe
- In office 12 December 2014 – 6 November 2017
- President: Robert Mugabe
- Preceded by: Joice Mujuru
- Succeeded by: Constantino Chiwenga

Minister of Justice, Legal and Parliamentary Affairs
- In office 11 September 2013 – 9 October 2017
- President: Robert Mugabe
- Deputy: Fortune Chasi
- Preceded by: Patrick Chinamasa
- Succeeded by: Happyton Bonyongwe
- In office 31 December 1989 – 1 July 2000
- President: Robert Mugabe
- Preceded by: Eddison Zvobgo
- Succeeded by: Patrick Chinamasa

Minister of Defence
- In office 13 February 2009 – 11 September 2013
- President: Robert Mugabe
- Preceded by: Sydney Sekeramayi
- Succeeded by: Sydney Sekeramayi

Minister of Rural Housing and Social Amenities
- In office 9 April 2005 – 13 February 2009
- President: Robert Mugabe
- Deputy: Joel Biggie Matiza
- Succeeded by: Fidelis Mhashu

Speaker of Parliament
- In office 18 July 2000 – 9 April 2005
- Preceded by: Cyril Ndebele
- Succeeded by: John Nkomo

Minister of State for National Security
- In office 1980–1988
- Prime Minister: Robert Mugabe
- Preceded by: Office established
- Succeeded by: Sydney Sekeramayi

Member of Parliament
- In office 13 May 1980 – 2014
- Succeeded by: Auxillia Mnangagwa
- Constituency: Midlands (1980–1985); Kwekwe East (1985–1990); Kwekwe (1990–2000); Appointed (2000–2008); Chirumanzu–Zibagwe (2008–2014)

Personal details
- Born: Dambudzo Mnangagwa; 15 September 1942 (age 84) Shabani, Southern Rhodesia
- Party: ZANU–PF (since 1987)
- Other political affiliations: UNIP (1959–1962); ZAPU (1962–1963); ZANU (1963–1987)
- Spouses: Jayne Matarise (m. 1973; died 2002): Auxillia Kutyauripo
- Relations: Tongai Mnangagwa (nephew)
- Children: 18 (including David)
- Education: University of London (LLB); University of Zambia; Egyptian Military Academy
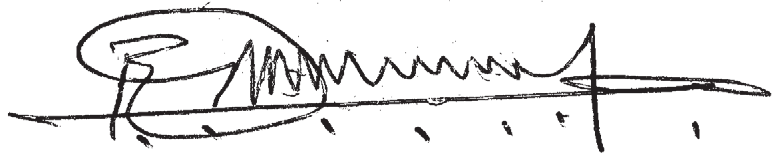
- Signature
- n.b. The office was vacant following Mohadi's resignation in 2021 until his reappointment to the office in 2023.

Emmerson Dambudzo Mnangagwa (Note: US: /mənəŋˈɡɑːɡwə/ mə-nəng-GAH-gwə, Shona: [m̩naˈᵑɡaɡwa]) (born 15 September 1942) is a Zimbabwean politician who has served as the president of Zimbabwe since 2017. His rule has been described as a dictatorship. A member of ZANU–PF and a longtime ally of former president Robert Mugabe, he held a series of cabinet portfolios and he was Mugabe's first vice-president from 2014 until 2017, when he was dismissed before coming to power in a coup d'état. He secured his first full term as president in the disputed 2018 general election. Mnangagwa was re-elected in the 2023 Zimbabwean general election with 52.6% of the vote.

Mnangagwa was born in 1942 in Shabani, Southern Rhodesia, to a large Shona family. His parents were farmers, and in the 1950s he and his family were forced to move to Northern Rhodesia because of his father's political activism. There he became active in anti-colonial politics, and in 1963 he joined the newly formed Zimbabwe African National Liberation Army, the militant wing of the Zimbabwe African National Union (ZANU). He returned to Rhodesia in 1964 as leader of the "Crocodile Group", a group that attacked white-owned farms in the Eastern Highlands. In 1965, he bombed a train near Fort Victoria (now Masvingo) and was imprisoned for ten years, after which he was released and deported to the recently independent Zambia. He later studied law at the University of Zambia and practiced as an attorney for two years before going to Mozambique to rejoin ZANU. In Mozambique, he was assigned to be Robert Mugabe's assistant and bodyguard and accompanied him to the Lancaster House Agreement which resulted in Zimbabwe's recognised independence in 1980.

After independence, Mnangagwa held a series of senior cabinet positions under Mugabe. From 1980 to 1988, he was the country's first minister of state security, and oversaw the Central Intelligence Organisation. His role in the Gukurahundi massacres, in which thousands of Ndebele civilians were killed during his tenure, is controversial. Mnangagwa was Minister of Justice, Legal and Parliamentary Affairs from 1989 to 2000 and then Speaker of the Parliament from 2000 until 2005, when he was demoted to Minister of Rural Housing for openly jockeying to succeed the aging Mugabe. He returned to favour during the 2008 general election, in which he ran Mugabe's campaign, orchestrating political violence against the opposition Movement for Democratic Change – Tsvangirai. Mnangagwa served as Minister of Defence from 2009 until 2013, when he became justice minister again. He was also appointed First Vice-President in 2014 and was widely considered a leading candidate to succeed Mugabe.

Mnangagwa's ascendancy was opposed by Mugabe's wife, Grace Mugabe, and her Generation 40 political faction. Mugabe dismissed Mnangagwa from his positions in November 2017, and he fled to South Africa. Soon after, General Constantino Chiwenga, backed by elements of the Zimbabwe Defence Forces and members of Mnangagwa's Lacoste political faction, launched a coup. After losing ZANU–PF's support, Mugabe resigned, and Mnangagwa returned to Zimbabwe to assume the presidency.

Mnangagwa is commonly nicknamed "Garwe" or "Ngwena" (Shona: 'The crocodile'). It came initially from the name of the guerrilla group he founded, but later came to denote his political shrewdness. Reflecting this, the pro-Mnangagwa faction within ZANU–PF is named Lacoste after the French clothing company, known for its crocodile logo. He is also known in his home province of Midlands as "the Godfather". Mnangagwa was included in Time magazine's 100 Most Influential People of 2018.

== Early life and education ==
=== Early childhood: 1942–1955 ===
Dambudzo Mnangagwa was born on 15 September 1942 in Shabani (now Zvishavane), a mining town in central Southern Rhodesia. His parents, Mafidhi and Mhurai Mnangagwa, were politically active farmers. He belonged to a large family; his grandfather had six wives and 32 sons (daughters were not counted), and Mnangagwa himself is the third of ten siblings. His father had two wives, having inherited his wife Mhurai's sister after the death of her husband. Mnangagwa thus had eight additional half-siblings who were also his cousins. The Mnangagwa family were members of the Karanga people, the largest subgroup of Zimbabwe's majority Shona ethnic group.

As a child, Mnangagwa herded cattle and was permitted to visit the local chief's court, where he went to watch cases being heard in a traditional setting. His paternal grandfather, Mubengo Kushanduka, had a great influence on him during his formative years. Kushanduka had served in the court of the Ndebele king Lobengula and fought in the Second Matabele War in the 1890s, and Mnangagwa enjoyed listening to him telling his stories.

By the late 1940s, Mnangagwa's father Mafidhi had become the acting chief of the village. In 1952, a white land development officer arrived and confiscated some cattle from the villagers, including from an elderly woman who was left with just three. In response, Mafidhi's advisors removed a wheel from the officer's Land Rover, resulting in Mafidhi's arrest. The district commissioner said he did not want to fight or imprison him, and told him to go to Northern Rhodesia. He complied, settling in the town of Mumbwa with a relative. Several years later, he sent for the rest of his family, including Mnangagwa, to join him. They arrived in Mumbwa by train in 1955, and over the years more extended relatives came to join them. There, Mnangagwa first met Robert Mugabe when Mugabe stayed with the Mnangagwa family for a time while working at a teachers' college in Lusaka. Mugabe inspired Mnangagwa to become involved in anti-colonial politics.

=== Education and early political activity: 1955–1962 ===
Mnangagwa, who had begun his primary education at Lundi Primary School in Shabani, resumed his studies at Myooye School in Mumbwa. Most of his classmates at Myooye had three names, while Mnangagwa only had one, Dambudzo. After finding a book in the school library by the American philosopher and poet Ralph Waldo Emerson, he decided to adopt the name "Emmerson" before his given name. After a short period at Myooye, Mnangagwa completed standards 4, 5, and 6 at Mumbwa Boarding School. From 1958 to 1959, he attended Kafue Trade School in Kafue, where he took a building course.

Although his course at Kafue was supposed to last three years, in 1959 Mnangagwa decided to leave early and attend Hodgson Technical College, one of the country's leading educational institutions. The college accepted only applicants with Ordinary Levels, which he lacked, so he took the entrance exam, and was admitted upon receiving a high score. At Hodgson, he enrolled in a four-year City and Guilds Industrial Building programme. He became involved in student anti-colonial politics, becoming an elected officer of the college's United National Independence Party (UNIP) branch. His activism sometimes turned violent, and in 1960 he was found guilty of setting one of the college's buildings on fire and expelled. After his expulsion, he started a construction company with three other men that lasted three months. He was tasked by UNIP leaders to organise and expand the party's presence in Bancroft, a town in Copperbelt Province, until the end of 1961. He then returned to Lusaka, where he served as secretary of the UNIP Youth League while also working for a private company.

== Revolutionary activity ==
=== Recruitment and training: 1962–1964 ===
In 1962, Mnangagwa was recruited in Northern Rhodesia by Willie Musarurwa to join the Zimbabwe African People's Union (ZAPU), a newly formed pro-independence party in Southern Rhodesia. He became a guerrilla fighter for ZAPU's armed wing, the Zimbabwe People's Revolutionary Army (ZIPRA), and was sent to Tanganyika (now Tanzania) for training. He stayed first in Mbeya, and then at a new training camp in Iringa, where he met leading black nationalists like James Chikerema and Clement Muchachi. While there, he criticised the decisions of ZAPU's leader, Joshua Nkomo, an offence for which a ZIPRA tribunal chaired by Dumiso Dabengwa sentenced him to death. Two other ZAPU members of his same Karanga background, Simon Muzenda and Leopold Takawira, the party's external affairs secretary, intervened to save his life.

In April 1963, Mnangagwa and 12 other ZAPU members were sent via Dar es Salaam to Egypt for training at the Egyptian Military Academy in Cairo's Heliopolis suburb. In August 1963, ten of the 13 trainees, including Mnangagwa, joined the Zimbabwe African National Union (ZANU), which had been formed earlier that month as a breakaway group from ZAPU. The ten stopped training for ZAPU and were subsequently detained by Egyptian authorities. During their detention, they contacted ZANU official Robert Mugabe in Tanganyika with the information that they intended to join ZANU and had been detained. Mugabe redirected Trynos Makombe, who was returning from China, to Egypt to resolve the issue. Makombe secured their release and gave them plane tickets to Dar es Salaam. After arriving in Tanganyika in late August 1963, six of the eleven returned to Southern Rhodesia, while the other five, including Mnangagwa, were sent to briefly stay at a training camp in Bagamoyo run by FRELIMO, the group seeking to liberate Mozambique from Portuguese rule.

Mnangagwa soon left Tanganyika to train for ZANU's militant wing, the Zimbabwe African National Liberation Army (ZANLA). Part of the first group of ZANLA fighters sent overseas for training, he and four others were sent to Beijing, where he spent the first two months studying at Peking University's School of Marxism, run by the Chinese Communist Party. He then spent three months in combat training in Nanjing and studied at a school for military engineering before returning to Tanzania in May 1964. There, he briefly stayed at ZANLA's Itumbi Reefs training camp near Chunya.

=== The Crocodile Group: 1964–1965 ===
Upon returning to Tanzania, Mnangagwa co-founded the Crocodile Group, a ZANLA guerrilla unit led by William Ndangana composed of the men he had trained within China: John Chigaba, Robert Garachani, Lloyd Gundu, Felix Santana, and Phebion Shonhiwa. They were meant to be provided with weapons, but none were available. The group rushed to attend the ZANU Congress in the Mkoba suburb of Gwelo, arriving the day before it commenced on 21 May 1964. At the congress, Ndabaningi Sithole was elected president, Takawira vice-president, Herbert Chitepo national chairman, Mugabe secretary-general, and Enos Nkala treasurer. Shortly after the congress, three members of the Crocodile Group were captured and arrested for smuggling guns into the country, while Lawrence Svosve went missing after being sent by Mnangagwa to Lusaka to retrieve some messages. Despite these losses, the Crocodile Group remained active and was joined by Matthew Malowa, a ZANU member who had trained in Egypt.

In addition to smuggling weapons into Rhodesia, ZANLA leaders tasked the Crocodile Group with recruiting new members from the urban centres of Salisbury, Fort Victoria, Belingwe, and Macheke, and smuggling them through the border at Mutoko into Tanzania for training. The Crocodile Group traveled back and forth on foot between Salisbury and Mutoko. Soon, party leaders at Sikombela sent the group a message urging them to take more extreme actions as a means of gaining publicity, with the hope that greater exposure would bring ZANU's efforts to the attention of the Organisation of African Unity's Liberation Committee, which was meeting in Dar es Salaam at the time. The Crocodile Group, now comprising Ndangana, Malowa, Victor Mlambo, James Dhlamini, Master Tresha, and Mnangagwa, met to make plans at Ndabaningi Sithole's house in the Highfield suburb of Salisbury.

On 4 July 1964, the Crocodile Group ambushed and murdered Pieter Johan Andries Oberholzer, a white factory foreman and police reservist, in Melsetter, near Southern Rhodesia's eastern border. Dhlamini and Mlambo were caught and hanged for the crime; the others evaded capture. The event marked the first instance of violence in what became the Rhodesian Bush War, and prompted the government to crack down on both ZANU and ZAPU. In August 1964, the administration of Prime Minister Ian Smith imprisoned Sithole, Takawira, Edgar Tekere, Enos Nkala, and Maurice Nyagumbo. ZANLA was left with Josiah Tongogara and Herbert Chitepo as its leaders. Before Oberholzer's murder, the gang had already bombed the Nyanyadzi police station and attempted other ambushes after arriving in Southern Rhodesia via bus from Kitwe, Northern Rhodesia. It continued its campaign of violence after the killing, setting up roadblocks to terrorize whites and attacking white-owned farms in the country's Eastern Highlands. The gang became known for its use of knives and for leaving green handwritten anti-government pamphlets at the scenes of its crimes.

=== Imprisonment: 1965–1975 ===
In late 1964, Mnangagwa blew up a train near Fort Victoria (now Masvingo), and was arrested by police inspectors in January 1965 at the Highfield home of Michael Mawema, who may have given them his location. He was given over to the Rhodesia Special Branch, which tortured him by hanging him upside down and beating him, an ordeal that reportedly caused him to lose hearing in his left ear. He was convicted under Section 37(1)(b) of the Law and Order Maintenance Act and sentenced to death, but his lawyers successfully argued that he was under 21, the minimum age for execution. Depending on which birth year is accepted for Mnangagwa, this claim might have been a lie. According to an excerpt from the court judgment that was published in a biography of Mnangagwa by Eddie Cross, the judge decided not to sentence him to death, partly because of his age but also because he did not regard the offense as serious enough to warrant the death penalty. Other sources state that a priest intervened on his behalf, or that he avoided execution because he was Zambian, not because of his age. Whatever the reason, Mnangagwa was instead sentenced to ten years in prison.

Mnangagwa served the first year of his sentence in Salisbury Central Prison, followed by Grey Street Prison in Bulawayo, and finally Khami Maximum Security Prison in Bulawayo, where he arrived on 13 August 1966 and spent the next six years and eight months. At Khami, he was given the number 841/66 and classified as "D" class, reserved for those considered most dangerous, and was held with other political prisoners, whom the government kept in a separate block of cells away from other inmates out of fear that they would influence them ideologically. Mnangagwa's cell, Cell 42, was in "B" Hall, which also housed future Vice-President Kembo Mohadi and the journalist Willie Musarurwa.

Mnangagwa's cell at Khami was austere, with double-thick walls and only a toilet bucket and Bible allowed inside. At first, while still on death row, he was allowed to leave his cell for only 15 minutes per day, during which he was expected to exercise, empty his toilet bucket, and have a shower in the communal washroom. The Rhodesia Prison Service maintained different facilities and rules for white and black prisoners, the latter being subject to significantly inferior conditions. Black inmates were given just two sets of clothes and were fed plain sadza and vegetables for every meal. During his first four years at Khami, Mnangagwa was assigned to hard labour. After Red Cross representatives visited the prison and complained to the government about the poor conditions of political prisoners, conditions were eased somewhat. Mnangagwa was then allowed to volunteer as a tailor, as he knew how to use a sewing machine. After two years mending inmates' clothes, he was made to rejoin other prisoners in hard labour, which involved crushing rocks in a large pit in the prison yard.

Mnangagwa was discharged from Khami on 6 January 1972 and transferred back to Salisbury Central Prison, where he was detained alongside other revolutionaries, including Mugabe, Nkala, Nyagumbo, Tekere and Didymus Mutasa. There, he befriended Mugabe and attended his prison classes, after which he passed his O-Levels and A-Levels. Together, they studied law via correspondence courses. Mnangagwa initially wanted to pursue a Bachelor of Science in economics, but instead decided to study law. In 1972, he took his final examinations for a Bachelor of Laws through the University of London International Programmes. Mnangagwa and his lawyers discovered a loophole that would allow him to be deported after his release if he claimed to be Zambian. Even after his ten-year sentence expired, he remained in prison for several months while his papers were being processed. In 1975, after more than ten years in prison, including three in solitary confinement, he was released and deported to Zambia, where his parents were still living. He was brought to the Livingstone border post and handed over to Zambian police, after which a ZANLA representative met him at the Victoria Falls Bridge and took him to Lusaka.

=== Legal studies and ZANU leadership: 1975–1980 ===
In Lusaka, Mnangagwa continued his education at the University of Zambia, where he was active in the student board for politics, graduating with a postgraduate law degree. He then completed his articling with the Lusaka-based law firm of the Rhodesian-born Enoch Dumbutshena, who would later become Zimbabwe's first black judge. He was admitted to the Zambian bar in 1976. At the same time, Mnangagwa was also serving as the secretary for ZANU's Zambia Division, based in Lusaka. After a couple of years working for a private law firm, he moved to Mozambique. He visited Maputo at the request of Josiah Tongogara, and on the basis of the friendship he had developed with Mugabe in prison, became a security chief for ZANU. While there, he met Mugabe again, and became his assistant and bodyguard. At the 1977 ZANU Congress in Chimoio, he was elected special assistant to President Mugabe and a member of ZANU's National Executive. In this capacity, Mnangagwa headed both the civil and military divisions of ZANU. His deputy was Vitalis Zvinavashe, head of security for the Military High Command but subordinate to Mnangagwa in the Central Committee's Department of Security.

In 1979, Mnangagwa accompanied Mugabe to the negotiations in London that led to the signing of the Lancaster House Agreement, which brought an end to Rhodesia's unrecognised independence and ushered in majority rule. In January 1980, Mnangagwa led the first group of civilian leaders, including Mutasa and Eddison Zvobgo, as they made their way from Maputo into what would soon be the Republic of Zimbabwe.

== Post-independence political career ==
=== Minister of State for National Security: 1980–1988 ===
On 12 March 1980, the month before Zimbabwe's independence, incoming prime minister Robert Mugabe named his first cabinet, in which Mnangagwa was named Minister of State for National Security in the President's Office. Among other responsibilities, his portfolio oversaw the Central Intelligence Organisation, the national intelligence agency. In that position, Mnangagwa cultivated strong relationships with Zimbabwe's security establishment. After the head of Zimbabwe Defence Forces, the Rhodesian holdover general Peter Walls, was dismissed by Mugabe on 15 September 1980, Mnangagwa also took over as Chairman of the Joint Operations Command. In that role, he oversaw the integration of ZANLA and ZIPRA fighters with the existing units of the former Rhodesian Security Forces. During this period, he also served as ZANU's secretary for national security.

In the 1985 parliamentary election, Mnangagwa ran as ZANU's candidate for the Kwekwe East constituency. He won with 86% of the vote, defeating ZAPU's Elias Hananda and the United African National Council's Kenneth Kumbirayi Kaparepare, who respectively received 11% and 3%.

==== Gukurahundi ====
The Gukurahundi took place in Zimbabwe's western Matabeleland region (pictured in red)

While Mnangagwa was Minister of State for National Security, the 5th Brigade of the Zimbabwe National Army killed thousands of Ndebele civilians in the Matabeleland region of western Zimbabwe. These massacres, known as the Gukurahundi, lasted from 1983 to 1987, and resulted in an estimated 20,000 to 30,000 deaths. The extent of Mnangagwa's role in the genocide is disputed, with Mnangagwa himself denying any involvement. He asked in a 2017 interview, "How do I become the enforcer of the Gukurahundi? We had the president, the minister of defence, the commander of the army, and I was none of that."

Despite his denials, Mnangagwa is accused by many, including foreign governments, opposition politicians, and human rights groups, of playing a significant, or leading role in the Gukurahundi. As national security minister, his CIO worked with the army to suppress ZAPU, ZANU's rival political party, which drew its support from Ndebele people. In the lead-up to the massacres, he delivered speeches attacking the opposition. In a 15 March 1983 speech at a rally in Victoria Falls, he described government opponents as "cockroaches" and "bugs" that required the government to bring in DDT (a pesticide) to remove them. He also said that their villages should be burned. In another speech, he said: "Blessed are they who follow the path of government laws, for their days on earth shall be increased. But woe unto those who will choose the path of collaboration with dissidents, for we will certainly shorten their stay on earth."

When the massacres began, Mnangagwa was tasked with explaining the violence to the international community, and made most of the public comments on behalf of the Zimbabwean government on the activities of the 5th Brigade. In addition, documents from both the United States Department of State and the Australian embassy in Harare reveal Mnangagwa's knowledge of and role in the Gukurahundi. While the 5th Brigade, which Mnangagwa did not directly oversee, carried out the vast majority of the killings, the CIO participated in other ways, including apprehending and interrogating alleged dissidents. Whereas the 5th Brigade targeted large numbers of Ndebele civilians, the CIO often focused on more specific targets, particularly ZAPU leaders and organizers. The CIO also provided information, including documents and surveillance intelligence, to the 5th Brigade and other segments of the government involved in the violence. The CIO gave Bush War-era ZIPRA personnel files to the 5th Brigade, which used them to seek out ex-ZANU and ZIPRA leaders in Matabeleland. In addition to focused violence and intelligence-sharing, CIO leaders also cooperated with other groups participating in the Gukurahundi through informal channels of communication. In Zimbabwe at the time, coordination between government agencies did not always occur within bureaucratic channels, but often through ethnic or political connections. Thus, as Mugabe's security minister, Mnangagwa's role was not necessarily restricted by the limitations of his ministry or the CIO.

The Gukurahundi ended with the signing of the Unity Accord on 22 December 1987. The agreement, signed by Prime Minister Mugabe and ZAPU leader Joshua Nkomo, merged ZAPU into the ruling Zimbabwe African National Union – Patriotic Front (ZANU–PF). On 18 April 1988, Mugabe announced amnesty for all dissidents, and in return, Nkomo called on them to lay down their arms. In the late 1980s, a series of court cases exposed the existence of apartheid South African spies within the CIO, who played a significant role in causing the Gukurahundi by providing distorted intelligence reports and purposely inflaming ethnic tensions. These spies, white holdovers from the Rhodesian era, contributed to South Africa's interest in destabilising the newly independent Zimbabwe. In particular, they sought to damage ZAPU and ZIPRA, which maintained close ties to the African National Congress, the leading anti-apartheid group in South Africa. Mnangagwa admitted that the South Africa had a "major implant in intelligence under Smith" and that Zimbabwe's post-independence government "initially left these implants". Asked why these agents were allowed to remain the CIO, he responded, "We had no choice. We could not allow our whole intelligence capability to collapse overnight."

White CIO agents who cooperated with South Africa included Geoffrey Price, an agent responsible for Prime Minister Mugabe's personal security, who, along with a small cell of white agents, supplied information leading to South Africa's August 1981 assassination of Joe Gqabi, an ANC representative in Zimbabwe. Another, Matt Calloway, formerly the CIO's top agent in Hwange District, was in 1983 identified by the Zimbabwean government as being involved a South African operation that recruited, trained, and armed disaffected Ndebeles and sent them back into Matabeleland as guerrillas. The violence they sparked contributed to the start of the Gukurahundi. A third was Kevin Woods, an agent until 1986, who served as the CIO's top administrative officer in Bulawayo throughout much of the Gukurahundi. In 1988, Woods was arrested and charged with participating in a car bomb attack targeting an ANC representative in Bulawayo. At his trial, he confessed—freely, he said, because he feared interrogation methods which he was very familiar from his time at the CIO—to being a double agent for South Africa. Woods' confession, part of a high-profile case that reached Zimbabwe's Supreme Court, brought new attention to the wide scope of South Africa's infiltration of Zimbabwe's intelligence apparatus, especially in relation to the Gukurahundi. The Woods affair was embarrassing for Mnangagwa, and according to one source, caused Mugabe to remove him from the position of Minister of State Security.

=== Minister of Justice: 1988–2000 ===
In 1988, President Mugabe appointed Mnangagwa Minister of Justice, Legal and Parliamentary Affairs. According to a 1988 report by the U.S. embassy in Harare, Mugabe originally intended to name Mnangagwa Minister of Defence, but was persuaded not to by Nathan Shamuyarira and Sydney Sekeramayi, the leaders of the "Group of 26", a clique that sought to increase the political power of members of the Zezuru people, a Shona subgroup. Shamuyarira and Sekeramayi objected to Mnangagwa's appointment to the post because he was Karanga, but did not oppose Mugabe's replacement appointee, Enos Nkala, an Ndebele. Not coincidentally, Sekeramayi himself succeeded Mnangagwa as Minister of State for National Security. Instead, Mugabe appointed Mnangagwa Minister of Justice, succeeding Eddison Zvobgo, another Karanga. Mnangagwa, who expected to be named Minister of Defence or Minister of Home Affairs, considered this appointment a demotion, as the ministry had already completed its most important tasks under Zvobgo's leadership. These included drafting the constitutional amendments that abolished the 20 seats in Parliament reserved for whites and establishing an executive presidency, which both were completed in 1987. Mnangagwa was initially so disappointed with his cabinet role that he considered leaving politics and entering the private sector, but he ultimately accepted the new position.

Mnangagwa ran for reelection to Parliament in the 1990 election, this time in the newly created Kwekwe constituency. ZANU–PF ran a well-publicised and organised campaign in Kwekwe, holding meetings between Mnangagwa and community leaders and putting up numerous posters. However, there were also reports of voter intimidation and harassment, including from Women's League members, some of whom said they were coerced into joining a demonstration against the Zimbabwe Unity Movement, the opposition party contesting Mnangagwa's seat. On election day, Mnangagwa won with 23,898 votes, while his little-known rival, ZUM candidate Sylvester Chibanda, received only 7,094 votes. Mnangagwa was reelected again in the 1995 parliamentary election, in another race marked by voter intimidation. Election monitors in Kwekwe reported that voters were told that if they did not vote with ZANU–PF, the Gukurahundi atrocities would be repeated against them.

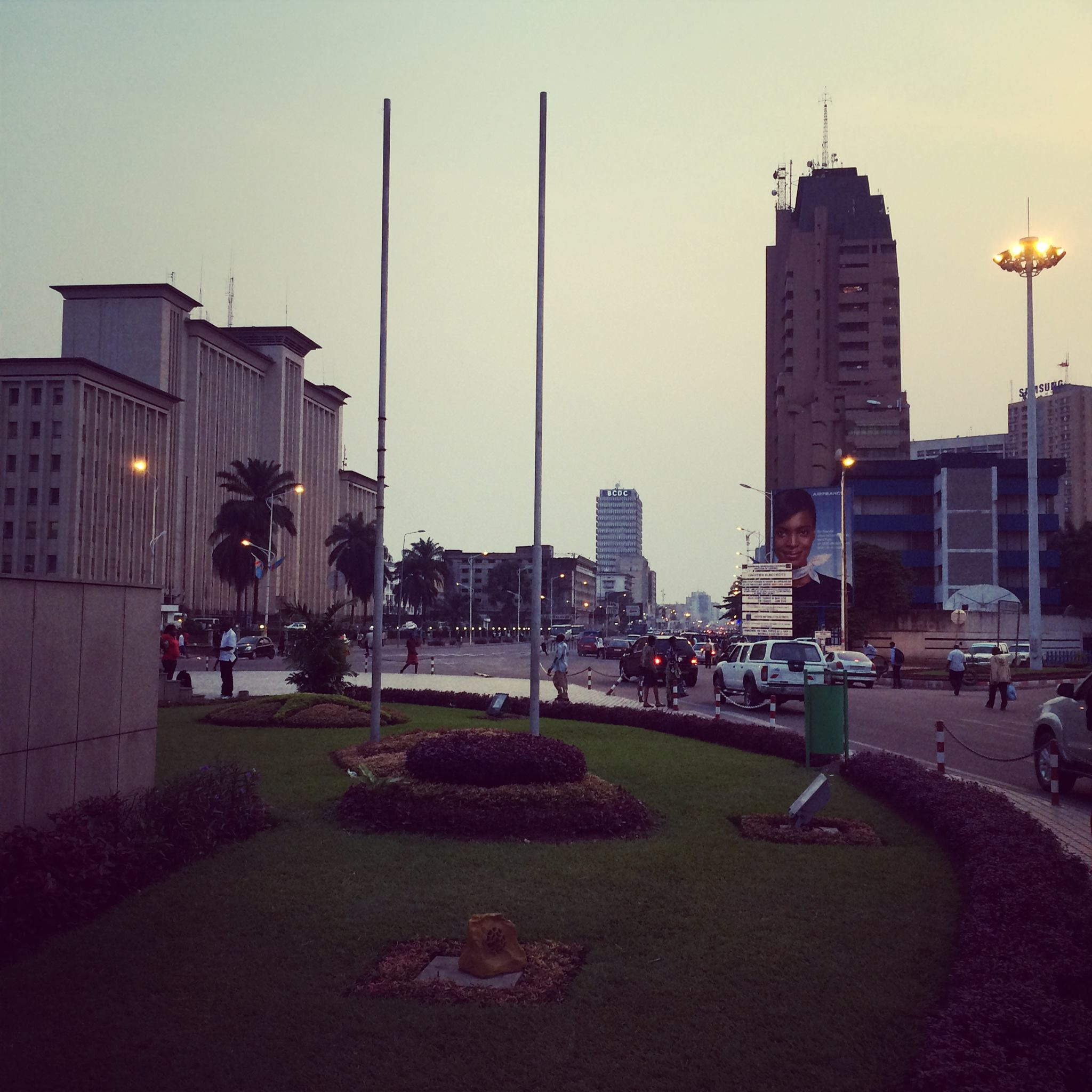
Kinshasa, where Mnangagwa was often based during the Second Congo War.

While serving as justice minister, Mnangagwa was also acting finance minister from November 1995 to April 1996, after the previous minister, Bernard Chidzero, stepped down for health reasons, and his successor Ariston Chambati died. He was also acting Minister of Foreign Affairs for a short period. In 1998, Mnangagwa was put in charge of Zimbabwe's intervention in the Second Congo War, in which the Zimbabwe National Army entered the Democratic Republic of the Congo on the side of Congolese President Laurent-Désiré Kabila. A 2000 article in the Zimbabwean magazine Moto described Mnangagwa as Mugabe's heir apparent, writing, "With the DRC issue at hand, it has been difficult to tell whether he is the Minister of Justice or the Minister of Defence as he has been shuttling between Harare and Kinshasa." During the war, Mnangagwa enriched himself through mineral wealth seized from the Congo. After Billy Rautenbach, a Zimbabwean businessman, was placed in charge of Gécamines, the Congolese state mining company, Mnangagwa began brokering deals between the company and Zimbabwean connections.

=== Speaker of Parliament: 2000–2005 ===
Mnangagwa ran in the 2000 parliamentary election as the ZANU–PF candidate for the Kwekwe constituency. He was defeated by Blessing Chebundo of the newly formed Movement for Democratic Change, who received 64% of the vote to Mnangagwa's 35%. Mnangagwa lost in spite of voter intimidation and violence by ZANU–PF, which included dousing Chebundo in petrol and attempting to burn him alive, as well as setting Chebundo's house on fire. After his defeat, Mugabe appointed Mnangagwa to one of the 20 unelected seats in Parliament.

On 17 July 2000, Mugabe announced a new cabinet, from which Mnangagwa was conspicuously absent. His exclusion from the cabinet fanned speculation that Mnangagwa, widely seen as Mugabe's preferred successor, had lost favour with the president. However, the next day, when Parliament was sworn in, Mnangagwa was elected Speaker of the House of Assembly, receiving 87 ballots against MDC candidate Mike Mataure's 59 votes. The secret ballot election was the first competitive vote for speaker since the country's independence. Rather than having lost the president's favour, Mugabe likely excluded Mnangagwa from the cabinet because he was arranging for him to serve as speaker instead.

In October 2000, Mnangagwa thwarted an attempt by the MDC members of Parliament to impeach Mugabe. During his tenure as speaker, Mnangagwa continued to be subject to international scrutiny regarding his mining interests in the Congo during the Second Congo War. A 2001 United Nations report described him as "the architect of the commercial activities of ZANU–PF". A The Guardian article from the same year wrote that Mnangagwa "negotiated the swapping of Zimbabwean soldiers' lives for mining contracts". In 2002, a report authored by a panel commissioned by the UN Security Council implicated him in the exploitation of mineral wealth from the Congo and for his involvement in making Harare a significant illicit diamond trading centre. The panel and recommended that Mnangagwa, along with 53 others, be subject to international travel bans and financial restrictions. The following year, he was placed under United States sanctions.

In December 2004, internal divisions within ZANU–PF became public when Mnangagwa, along with Jonathan Moyo, the Minister of Information, were censured at a party meeting for allegedly plotting against Mugabe. The controversy began when Moyo hosted a meeting with other politicians in his home district of Tsholotsho to discuss replacing Mugabe's choice for vice-president, Joice Mujuru, with Mnangagwa. They hoped that as vice-president, Mnangagwa would be in a superior position to become president when Mugabe stepped down, which they believed might happen as early as 2008. The group also planned to replace ZANU–PF chair John Nkomo and party vice-president Joseph Msika with their preferred candidates.

Despite President Mugabe's calls for unity, observers described the rivalry between supporters of Mnangagwa and Mujuru as the most serious division within ZANU–PF in 30 years. Mujuru garnered a large amount of support in ZANU–PF's politburo, central committee, presidium, and among the provincial party chairs. Mnangagwa's support came from the senior ranks of the security establishment, as well as parts of ZANU–PF's parliamentary caucus and younger party members. The rivalry was ethnic as well as political: Mnangagwa drew his support from members of his ethnic group, the Karanga, while Mujuru's supporters were largely Zezuru.

At the ZANU–PF party congress held from 1–5 December 2004, Mujuru was named vice-president, while Moyo and other Mnangagwa proponents were disciplined. Moyo was removed from the cabinet and the politburo, and seven other party officials were penalized with suspensions, preventing them from running for Parliament in the upcoming elections. Mnangagwa attempted to distance himself from the controversy, but nevertheless lost his title as ZANU–PF's secretary for administration, an office he had held for four years and one that gave him the power to appoint his allies to important party positions. In what was considered a demotion, he was given the less influential position of secretary for legal affairs instead.

=== Minister of Rural Housing: 2005–2009 ===
In the March 2005 parliamentary election, Mnangagwa was again defeated by Blessing Chebundo in the Kwekwe constituency, this time with 46 percent of the votes to Chebundo's 54 percent. Just as before, Mugabe appointed Mnangagwa to one of the unelected seats in Parliament. John Nkomo replaced Mnangagwa as Speaker of Parliament. In the new cabinet, Mugabe named Mnangagwa as Minister of Rural Housing and Social Amenities. This was widely seen as a demotion by Mugabe in retribution for Mnangagwa's involvement in the plot for him to become vice-president over Mujuru, the president's choice.

In 2005, Mnangagwa helped carry out Operation Murambatsvina, an initiative in which urban slums, home to many people who opposed Mugabe's rule, were destroyed, resulting in the homelessness of thousands of the urban poor. By 2007, Mnangagwa was reportedly back in Mugabe's favour, and the president was now said to be dismayed at the political activities of Mnangagwa's rival, Vice-President Mujuru, and her husband, former army chief Solomon Mujuru.

==== 2007 alleged coup attempt ====
In May 2007, the Zimbabwean government announced that it had foiled an alleged coup d'état involving nearly 400 soldiers and high-ranking members of the military that would have occurred on either 2 or 15 June 2007. The alleged leaders of the coup, all of whom were arrested, were retired army Captain Albert Matapo, army spokesman Ben Ncube, Major General Engelbert Rugeje, and Air Vice Marshal Elson Moyo.

According to the government, the soldiers planned on forcibly removing Mugabe from the presidency and asking Mnangagwa to form a government with the heads of the armed forces. Reportedly, the government first learned of the plot when a former army officer in Paris, France, who opposed the coup contacted police and gave them a map and list of those involved. Mnangagwa said that he had no knowledge of the plot, and called it "stupid". Some analysts speculated that rival potential successors to Mugabe, such as former ZANLA leader Solomon Mujuru, may have been behind the scheme in an attempt to discredit Mnangagwa, who had for a number of years been seen as Mugabe's likely successor.

Treason charges were laid against Matapo and other alleged plotters, but no trial ever took place for lack of evidence. Nevertheless, Matapo and six others (not including Ncube, Rugeje, or Moyo) ended up spending seven years in Chikurubi Prison before being released in 2014. Matapo denied that he and the other accused plotters planning a coup, and said he had no interest in supporting Mnangagwa, whom he regarded as equally bad, if not worse, than Mugabe. Instead, Matapo said that the group were simply trying to form a new political party, which they eventually did after their release from prison.

=== 2008 election and return to favour ===
In the March 2008 parliamentary election, Mnangagwa stood as ZANU–PF's candidate in the newly created Chirumanzu–Zibagwe constituency in rural Midlands Province. He won by a wide margin, receiving 9,645 votes against two MDC candidates, Mudavanhu Masendeke and Thomas Michael Dzingisai, who respectively received 1,548 and 894 votes.

Mnangagwa was Mugabe's chief election agent during the 2008 presidential election, and headed Mugabe's campaign behind the scenes. Along with his team, Mnangagwa worked with party loyalists within the Joint Operations Command to ensure a Mugabe victory on election day. After Mugabe failed to win a majority in the initial vote, Mnangagwa organised a campaign of violence in the leadup to the second round of voting that caused opposition candidate Morgan Tsvangirai to withdraw from the election, securing Mugabe's continued rule.

=== Minister of Defence: 2009–2013 ===
After the Movement for Democratic Change – Tsvangirai won a majority of seats in Parliament in the 2008 election, Mnangagwa played a key role in brokering a power-sharing pact between ZANU–PF and the MDC–T. When the Government of National Unity was sworn in on 13 February 2009, Mnangagwa became Minister of Defence. Despite having coordinated a campaign of political violence against the MDC–T in 2008, and allegedly having been behind three separate attempts to assassinate Tsvangirai over the years, Mnangagwa spoke kindly about the country's coalition government in a 2011 interview. He said, "a lot of things have happened that are positive ... we can work together without too many problems."

In spite of his compliments of the unity government, Mnangagwa was accused by human rights groups of using his influence in the Joint Operations Command to mobilize violent pro-ZANU–PF groups ahead of the 2013 general election. Mnangagwa denied that he was in charge of the JOC, calling the allegations "nonsense" and insisting that he wanted upcoming elections to be "free and fair". He also denied having any presidential ambitions, pointing out that ZANU–PF has procedures to choose a new president. In the election, Mugabe was re-elected President by a wide margin, and ZANU–PF regained its majority in the National Assembly.

On 10 September 2013, Mugabe announced a new cabinet, appointing Mnangagwa to the post of Minister of Justice, Legal and Parliamentary Affairs, the office he previously held from 1989 to 2000. Vice-President Joice Mujuru's faction of the party was seen as the victor in Mugabe's cabinet appointment, taking most key positions, including defence, which was previously held by Mnangagwa but was given to Sydney Sekeramayi in the new cabinet. By contrast, Mnangagwa's faction received only two key portfolios: Patrick Chinamasa as minister of finance, and Mnangagwa himself as justice minister. The political scientist Eldred Masunungure attributed the Mujuru faction's gains to its influence in the ZANU–PF presidium. Masunungure described Mnangagwa's move from being minister of defence to becoming minister of justice as a "significant blow, though the justice ministry is quite important".

== Vice Presidency (2014–2017) ==
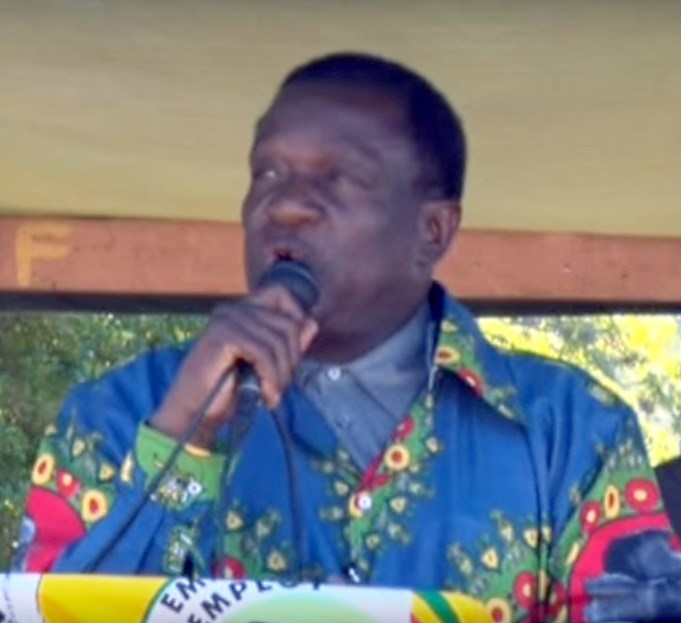
Mnangagwa as First Vice President speaking in 2015

On 10 December 2014, President Mugabe appointed Mnangagwa as First Vice-President of Zimbabwe, appearing to confirm his position as the presumed successor to Mugabe. His appointment followed the dismissal of Mnangagwa's long-time opponent in the succession rivalry, Joice Mujuru, who was cast into the political wilderness amidst allegations that she had plotted against Mugabe. Mnangagwa admitted he was not sure how the President would react to the allegations against Mujuru, but said he was satisfied with the outcome. He added that he had not known he was going to be named vice-president until Mugabe announced it. Mnangagwa was sworn in as vice-president on 12 December 2014, while retaining his post as Minister of Justice. Soon afterward, it was reported that Mugabe had begun delegating some presidential duties to Mnangagwa. On 11 January 2016, Mnangagwa became acting president while Mugabe was on his yearly vacation. Mnangagwa took over in this role from Second Vice-President Phelekezela Mphoko, who had been acting president when Mugabe last went on vacation on 24 December 2015. The decision to have Mnangagwa serve as acting president seemed to rebut rumors that Mugabe favoured Mphoko over Mnangagwa.

As vice-president, Mnangagwa focused on reviving Zimbabwe's agricultural sector and expanding the country's global trade connections. He helped negotiate trade deals with BRICS members Russia, China, and South Africa. In 2015, he also headed trade delegations to Europe to try and re-open trade ties that had been broken with the imposition of sanctions in 2001. In July 2016, Mnangagwa visited China, where he met with business leaders as well as Communist Party leaders and government officials, including Vice President Li Yuanchao. During that trip, Mnangagwa did an interview with China Central Television in which he said that Zimbabwe had fallen behind in development and called for reform, which reportedly angered Mugabe, who saw it as criticism of his presidency. In 2016, Mnangagwa announced that the Zimbabwean government would launch "Command Agriculture", an agricultural initiative backed by the African Development Bank. The programme, which Mnangagwa said would receive US$500 million in funding, would involve 2,000 maize-growing small-scale and commercial farmers and would allow the government to determine how much maize is grown and the price at which it is sold.

=== Power struggles and dismissal ===
Until she was dismissed as vice-president, Joice Mujuru was widely seen as Mnangagwa's main rival to succeed Mugabe as president. However, with Mujuru and her key supporters having been purged from the government and the party, she was no longer a threat to Mnangagwa. Prior to her dismissal, Mujuru had been the target of relentless disparagement by First Lady Grace Mugabe, who accused her of corruption and incompetence. Because both found common cause in opposing Mujuru, by the time he became vice-president, the first lady was seen as an emergent political ally of Mnangagwa. However, by late 2015, Mnangagwa's political ambitions openly clashed with those of Grace Mugabe, who was by then seen as a potential successor to her husband.

ZANU–PF was largely split between two factions: Generation 40, or G40, led by Grace Mugabe, and the Lacoste faction, thought to be led by Mnangagwa. Mnangagwa drew his support from war veterans and the country's military establishment, in part because of his past leadership of the Joint Operations Command, as well as his reputation in Zimbabwe as a cultivator of stability. The first lady, a relative political newcomer and head of the ZANU–PF Women's League, drew her support from younger, reform-minded party members who sought to replace the old guard. As the G40 faction set its sights on Mnangagwa, the Lacoste faction, largely made up of senior party members, pushed back. Mnangagwa used his leadership of Zimbabwe's Anti-Corruption Commission to try to discredit G40 leaders by targeting them with highly publicized criminal investigations.

By 2016, Grace Mugabe was openly savaging Mnangagwa at political rallies and speaking events. Speaking to crowds at a February 2016 ZANU–PF rally in Chiweshe, she accused him of disloyalty and infidelity, among other offences. Charging him with feigning love for Mugabe, she mocked his presidential ambitions, rhetorically asking, "Didn't you hear there's no vacancy at State House?" The First Lady further accused Mnangagwa, or his allies, of trying to bomb her dairy farm (in fact, several army officers and fringe political activists were charged with the crime), and suggested that his supporters were behind a plot to murder her son. Later that year, in November 2016, Mugabe declared that she was "already president" at a Women's League assembly, adding, "I plan and do everything with the president, what more do I want?" Still, President Mugabe did not, at least publicly, take sides in the feud between his wife and Mnangagwa. In February 2017, after his 93rd birthday, Mugabe announced that he would not retire nor pick a successor, though he said he would let ZANU–PF pick a successor if the party saw fit. In July 2017, Grace Mugabe publicly called on her husband to name an heir.

On 11 August 2017, Mnanangwa was allegedly poisoned at a ZANU–PF rally in Gwanda led by President Mugabe. After falling ill, Mnangagwa was airlifted first to Gweru, then to Harare, and finally to South Africa, where he underwent a minor surgery. Doctors reportedly ruled out routine food poisoning, but detected traces of palladium in his liver, which would require detoxification treatments over the following two months. Still, Minister of Information Chris Mushohwe maintained that "stale food" could have been to blame, stating, "I don't know about that palladium... our official statement stands." Following the incident, rumors spread among supporters of Mnangagwa that Grace Mugabe had ordered the vice-president's poisoning via ice cream produced at a dairy farm she controlled. The emergence of such rumors resulted in criticism directed at Mnangagwa. Phelekezela Mphoko, the country's other vice-president, publicly rebuked Mnangagwa, accusing him of attempting to weaken the country, divide ZANU–PF, and undermine the president, and claiming that doctors had concluded that stale food was to blame. Grace Mugabe herself denied the rumors that she was involved and rhetorically asked, "Who is Mnangagwa, who is he?" Mnangagwa responded by pledging loyalty to ZANU–PF and President Mugabe, and said the rumors regarding Grace Mugabe's involvement were untrue, adding that he had not consumed any dairy products from the first lady's farm.

On 9 October 2017, President Mugabe announced a new cabinet in which Mnangagwa, while maintaining the vice-presidency, lost his position as minister of justice to Happyton Bonyongwe, the country's spymaster. The previous week, Mnangagwa claimed that he had been poisoned at the August rally in Gwanda, in contrast to previous statements in which he said only that he had "fallen ill". That statement, coupled with President Mugabe's announcement several days later that he planned to review the performance of his ministers, led to speculation that a cabinet reshuffle could result in an unfavorable outcome for Mnangagwa.

On 6 November 2017, Mugabe dismissed Mnangagwa as vice-president, in a move that positioned First Lady Grace Mugabe to succeed the aging president. Information Minister Simon Khaya Moyo attributed the dismissal to Mnangagwa's "traits of disloyalty, disrespect, deceitfulness, and unreliability". Mnangagwa had been accused of undermining the president's authority and of plotting to take control of key government institutions. In a possible prelude to Mnangagwa's dismissal, two days earlier at a youth rally in Bulawayo, he had been cheered on by supporters, but was harshly rebuked by the president and first lady, who accused him of disloyalty. His removal was supported by Grace Mugabe and her G40 faction, and was a blow to the influence of the Lacoste faction, the military establishment, and the War Veterans Association, which formed Mnangagwa's base of support.

== 2017 coup d'état ==
On 8 November 2017, two days after his dismissal as vice-president, Mnangagwa fled Zimbabwe, first to Mozambique and then to South Africa, to escape what he called "incessant threats" against him and his family. Around a week later, on 14 November 2017, elements of the Zimbabwean military gathered in Harare, seizing control of the Zimbabwe Broadcasting Corporation (ZBC) and key areas of the city. The following day, Major General Sibusiso Moyo, representing the Zimbabwe Defence Forces, gave a live statement broadcast on the ZBC, the state broadcaster. Moyo asserted that the military was not taking over and that President Mugabe was safe, and that the military was "targeting criminals" responsible for the country's problems.

On 19 November 2017, Mugabe was sacked by ZANU–PF, and Grace Mugabe and 20 of her high-ranking supporters were expelled from the party. Mnangagwa, who was in South Africa at the time, was chosen as the party's new leader, and was expected to soon become president. President Mugabe was given a deadline of noon on 20 November to resign before impeachment proceedings would begin. Mugabe initially refused to step down, but ultimately resigned the next day before he could be impeached. ZANU–PF immediately nominated Mnangagwa as his successor, and it was announced that he would take over within 48 hours. Mnangagwa returned to Zimbabwe on 22 November from South Africa. The ZBC confirmed that Mnangagwa would be sworn in on 24 November 2017. The day before his inauguration, Mnangagwa urged his followers not to seek "vengeful retribution" against his political enemies, after calls emerged from his supporters to attack the Generation 40 faction.

== Presidency (2017–present) ==
=== Inauguration ===
Mnangagwa was sworn in as Zimbabwe's president on 24 November 2017 at the National Sports Stadium in Harare, before a crowd of around 60,000. Entertainment was provided by Zimbabwean singer Jah Prayzah, and attendees included several African leaders, foreign dignitaries, and domestic political figures, including opposition leaders Morgan Tsvangirai and Joice Mujuru. Foreign leaders who attended included Vice-President Mokgweetsi Masisi of Botswana, President Filipe Nyusi of Mozambique, Zambian President Edgar Lungu and former President Kenneth Kaunda, and former Namibian presidents Sam Nujoma and Hifikepunye Pohamba and current Vice-President Nickey Iyambo. Rory Stewart, the United Kingdom's Minister of State for Africa and the first British minister to visit Zimbabwe in two decades, attended the inauguration, and issued a statement describing the change in leadership as "an absolutely critical moment" after Mugabe's "ruinous rule". Robert Mugabe and his wife Grace were notably absent, the official explanation being that the former president needed to rest. South African President Jacob Zuma was also absent, but was represented by his Telecommunications Minister, Siyabonga Cwele.

Mnangagwa was sworn in by Chief Justice Luke Malaba. In his inaugural speech, he vowed to serve all citizens, reduce corruption, and revitalize the country's struggling economy. He distanced himself from President Mugabe by promising to "reengage with the world", but also paid tribute to his predecessor, praising him as "a father, mentor, comrade in arms, and my leader". He also said that Mugabe's post-2000 land reform programmes would be maintained, but that white farmers would be compensated for their seized land. Ahead of the 2018 general election, Mnangagwa held a public meeting for an audience of white Zimbabweans in Borrowdale, Harare in which he was seen to concede that many white farms which had been seized under land reform programs had gone to government officials, soldiers and tribal chiefs who did not know much about farming, before asking whites to work with his government. The speech both drew mixed responses among opposition politicians and was seen by commentators as a shift from Mugabe's policies and an attempt to court white voters.

Mnangagwa called for an end to European Union and United States sanctions against top Zimbabwean military and ZANU–PF figures (including himself), and stated that the 2018 general election would be held as planned.

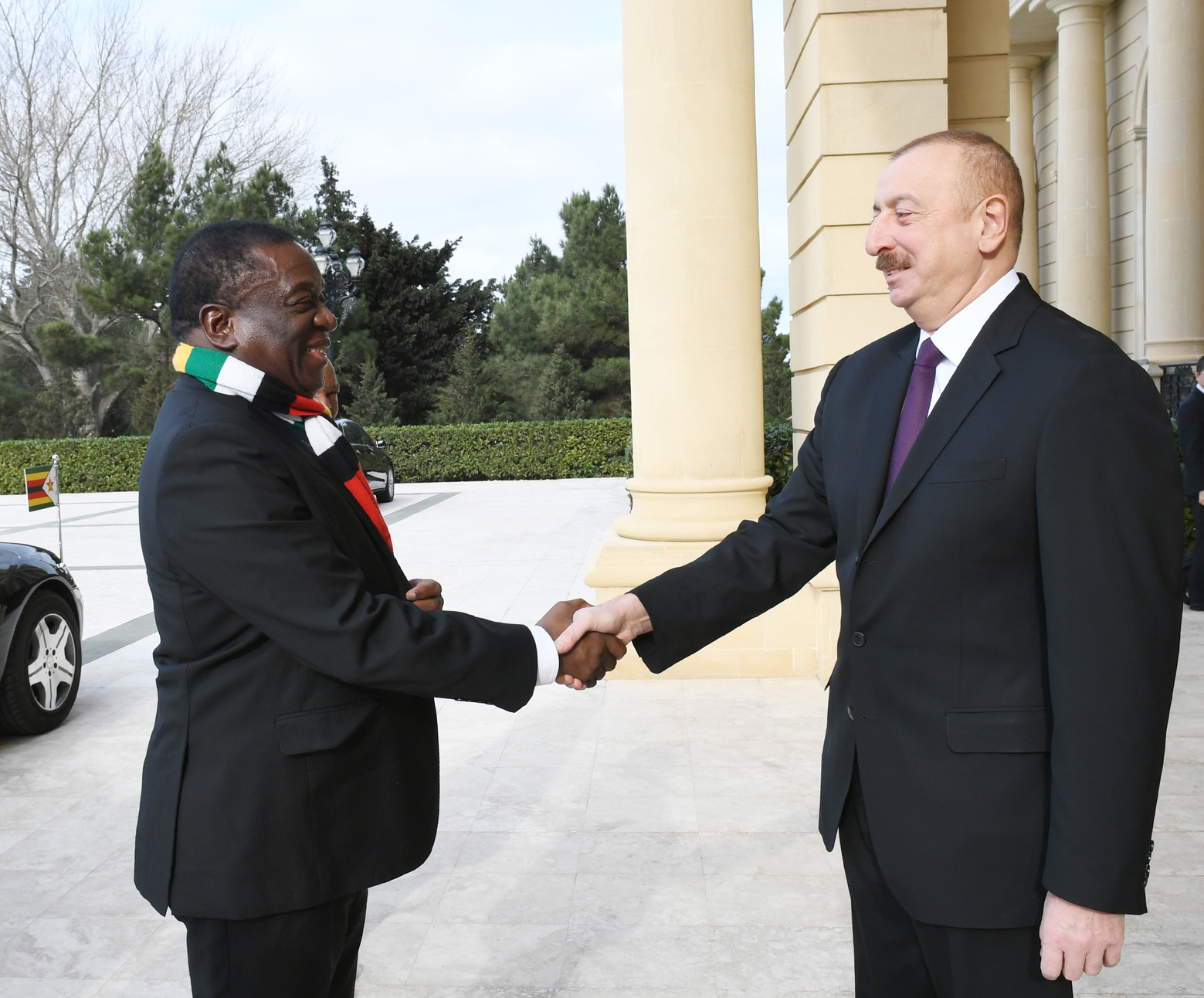
Mnangagwa with Azerbaijani President Ilham Aliyev in January 2019

=== Foreign relations ===
On 18 January 2018, Mnangagwa signalled his desire to re-engage with the West by inviting the United Nations, European Union and the Commonwealth to monitor elections in Zimbabwe in 2018. Additionally, Mnangagwa has signalled his wish to re-establish good relations with the United Kingdom and additionally rejoin the Commonwealth, a prospect which he said was improved by the British exit from the European Union. On 3 March 2021, newly inaugurated President Joe Biden of the United States issued a statement that criticizes Mnangagwa for violent repressions of citizens and lack of democratic reforms, authorizing an extension of US sanctions on Zimbabwe through a US national emergency declared in Executive Order 13288. Prior to the US's decision, Mnangagwa had claimed the US has "no moral right to levy sanctions" on Zimbabwe. In July 2023, Mnangagwa attended the 2023 Russia–Africa Summit in Saint Petersburg and met with Russian President Vladimir Putin. Mnangagwa voiced support for the Russian invasion of Ukraine. Mnangagwa has set himself apart from historical world leaders being the first documented death row inmate to later become president and then ban the death penalty.

=== Cabinet ===
On 27 November 2017, Mnangagwa dissolved the Cabinet of Zimbabwe and appointed only two acting ministers. Misheck Sibanda, Chief Secretary to the President and Cabinet, issued a statement saying: "To allow for uninterrupted services in critical ministries of government, the following have been appointed ministers in acting capacity until the announcement of a new cabinet: Honourable Patrick Chinamasa as acting minister of finance and economic development, and Honourable Simbarashe Mumbengegwi as acting minister of foreign affairs." His new cabinet was named on 30 November 2017.

On 3 December 2017, his new cabinet appointments were criticised which led to him replacing two of his cabinet ministers. On 6 December 2017, Mnangagwa was criticised because members of the armed forces and police services drove vendors from the streets of Harare and took the goods which they were attempting to sell. Some of the vendors were heard saying Mnangagwa was worse than Robert Mugabe and that "Mugabe was in a way better, he never sent soldiers to take away our goods."

=== Rapproachment with white Zimbabweans ===
In November 2017, Mnangagwa said that he would compensate white farmers whose land had been confiscated by the state. In 2018, prior to the general election, Mnangagwa spoke before white Zimbabweans in the Harare suburb of Borrowdale and asked the community to work with his government. He said later in the year that the government would no longer address land reform policy through racial lines, describing it as an "outdated" practice.

Farmers are farmers. We have lots of former [white] commercial farmers who have happily integrated into our system by accepting to have their farms reduced or downsized.

Compensation payments began in 2025, covering improvements made on the land, rather than the land itself.

Hundreds of white farmers returned to the country following a mellowing of restrictions on white Zimbabweans owning land. By September 2023, there were thought to be as many as 900 farms run by whites, most of them in joint ventures with blacks who had been given the properties after government confiscation.

In 2025, ZANU-PF national spokesperson Christopher Mutsvangwa boasted that significant numbers of whites were returning to the country, saying that they constituted the largest group of returning Zimbabweans.

=== Assassination attempt ===
Whilst leaving the podium after addressing a rally at White City Stadium in Bulawayo, the country's second-largest city, and ahead of the scheduled 31 July elections, a grenade was thrown at Mnangagwa and exploded. Mnangagwa escaped unharmed, although several members of the ZANU-PF party were injured, including his first and second vice-presidents—Constantino Chiwenga and Kembo Mohadi—as well as Marry Chiwenga, the first vice-president's wife.

=== Fuel protests ===
A graph of data released by the Reserve Bank of Zimbabwe showing the spike in inflation in the months leading up to the fuel rate hike

In January 2019, Mnangagwa announced fuel prices would be raised by 130% in an attempt to stop oil smuggling activities where offenders would buy petrol and transport it to surrounding countries. A financial and energy crisis stemmed from Zimbabwean bond coins and bills, with a value purportedly tied to the U.S. dollar, but being in reality worth noticeably less. For this reason, the proxy currency was being treated as being at a greater value than its actual worth, resulting in artificially low prices; the exportation of fuel purchased with this currency for resale with profits by smugglers presented significant problems as hard currency, which backs the proxy, is used by the nation to purchase all of Zimbabwe's oil from foreign countries, thus aggravating inflation and driving down the real value of the bond notes. As a measure to decrease the inflation rate, which had reached a peak of 18% in October 2018, the Mnangagwa government raised prices to effectively the highest in the world while keeping the bond currency, exceeding Hong Kong's fuel prices, the highest until that time; nationwide protests broke out after the price increase was announced. The police and military responded with a crackdown that resulted in hundreds of arrests and 12 deaths. Mnangagwa stated that claims of misconduct by the security forces would be investigated.

=== Gold Mafia scandal ===
In 2023, a gold-smuggling network operating through Zimbabwe was discovered with links to Mnangagwa and his ruling clique including then sports minister Kirsty Coventry. Close associate Scott Sakupwanya was named as the "king pin" but was later installed in the Parliament by Mnangagwa's ruling party.

Separately, convicted gold smuggler Ewan MacMillan fingered Mnangagwa as his partner claiming that he spent 60 days in prison to protect him.

=== Re-election ===
Mnangagwa was re-elected on 23 August 2023 for his second term with disputed election results. Because his party (ZANU-PF) has been the only party to control the presidency since the country's independence, and that he and his two predecessors, Mugabe and Canaan Banana, have also been the only presidents in the country's history, the election's results caused much suspicion, and allegations of fraud from the opposing party (who lost by roughly 8%).

On 4 March 2024, the United States imposed sanctions on Mnangagwa, his wife Auxillia Mnangagwa, Vice President Constantino Chiwenga and 11 other Zimbabwean individuals and entities for involvement in human rights abuses, corruption, and minerals smuggling.

Mnangagwa and Russian President Vladimir Putin at the Third Russia–Africa Summit in Moscow, 28 October 2026

On 2 September 2024, Mnangagwa announced that he will not seek a third term in 2028 and that he will finish his term by then.

Mnangagwa's presidency has been increasingly questioned, especially as protests grew in early 2025. Calls for his resignation intensified, particularly from former allies such as war veterans, who cited the country's ongoing economic struggles and the alleged enrichment of political elites. In response, Mnangagwa reshuffled his military leadership, appointing Emmanuel Matatu as army chief after the sudden retirement of Lieutenant General Anselem Nhamo Sanyatwe. Matatu, a former liberation war fighter, was seen as a loyalist to key military figures, including Zimbabwe Defence Forces commander Philip Valerio Sibanda. These developments occurred amid speculation that Mnangagwa might attempt to extend his presidency beyond the 2028 constitutional limit, despite his assurances that he would step down. This has added to the uncertainty surrounding Zimbabwe's political future, with widespread public discontent over economic mismanagement and corruption by government figures. Protests, although stifled by police crackdowns, reflected a broader sentiment of frustration with Mnangagwa's leadership and the state's failure to address the country's deepening crises.

At a party conference in Mutare on 18 October 2025, ZANU-PF adopted a resolution seeking to extend Mnangagwa’s term until 2030 through a constitutional amendment.

== Political positions ==
=== Indigenisation and black economic empowerment ===
From the early 1990s, Mnangagwa played a key role in implementing the "Indigenisation and Black Economic Empowerment" initiative, as advised by prominent indigenous businessmen including Ben Mucheche, John Mapondera, Paul Tangi Mhova Mkondo, and the think tank and lobby group IBDC. The initiative centered on propelling local policy, ministerial policy, government policy, and the development of a ministry specific to indigenisation and black economic empowerment, such as through the Indigenisation and Economic Empowerment Act. Mnangagwa believes that the national resources should be protected by the Zimbabwe Defence Forces.

=== Anti-Indian sentiment ===
In the months before the 2023 Zimbabwean general election, amongst widespread economic mismanagement by the Zimbabwean government, Mnangagwa accused Zimbabwean Indians of hoarding basic goods, and threatened to seize their property.

== Personal life ==
Mnangagwa is an evangelical Christian and attended the United Family International Church. In September 2026, he pledged a donation of 2 million U.S. dollars for the construction of a new building for the United Family International Church in Harare.

Mnangagwa has been married twice and has eighteen children and more than a dozen grandchildren. His first wife, Jayne Matarise, was a cousin of ZANLA commander Josiah Tongogara. They married in September 1973 and had six children together: Farai, Tasiwa, Vimbayi, Tapiwa, Tariro, and Emmerson Tanaka. His first two daughters, Farai and Tasiwa, were born in Zambia during the Bush War period. When Mnangagwa joined the ZANU leadership in Mozambique, Jayne initially remained in Zambia with the children, but later joined him there. After independence, she oversaw the family farm and a business of her own while her husband focused on his political career. Jayne Mnangagwa died on 31 January 2002 of cervical cancer.

While still married to Jayne, Mnangagwa began a relationship with Auxillia Kutyauripo. Their first son, Emmerson Jr., was born in 1984, followed by twins Sean and Collins. They reportedly married only after Jayne's death in 2002. Auxillia Mnangagwa, a former CIO officer and ZANU–PF Central Committee member, was elected to Parliament in 2015 for Chirumanzu–Zibagwe, the seat her husband vacated when he became vice-president. She did not run for reelection in the 2018 election, citing her desire to focus on her role as First Lady. In 2021, the President conferred on the First Lady the Order of the Star of Zimbabwe Gold Award as part of the national Heroes and Defence Forces Day celebrations.

His eldest child, Farai Mlotshwa, owns a real estate agency and is married to Gerald Mlotshwa, the lawyer of Phelekezela Mphoko, a political rival of Mnangagwa's and a backer of the pro-Grace Mugabe Generation 40 faction. His youngest daughter, Tariro, is a member of a female anti-poaching unit in the Zambezi Valley and was featured in Gonarezhou, an anti-poaching film released February 2020. His youngest and only son with Jayne Matarise, Emmerson Tanaka, is a musician and DJ known professionally as St Emmo. His eldest son and first child with Auxillia, Emmerson Jr., works in business and is active in the Midlands Province ZANU–PF Youth League. His twin sons, Sean and Collins, are an engineer and businessman, respectively.

His son David Kudakwashe Mnangagwa is a youth member of the National Assembly of Zimbabwe and the deputy minister of finance. His nephew Tongai Mnangagwa is also a minister in the Third Cabinet of Emmerson Mnangagwa.

In addition to his original farm in Masvingo Province, Mnangagwa also owns the Pricabe farm, which was given to him in 2002 as part of the land reform program, and is located close to Sherwood, Kwekwe.

== Honours ==
Honorary degrees

Location	Date	School	Degree	Gave commencement address
Zimbabwe	10 October 2018	University of Zimbabwe	Doctor of Laws (LL.D)	Yes
Zambia	29 June 2019	University of Zambia	Doctor of Laws (LL.D)	Yes
Zimbabwe	9 August 2019	Zimbabwe National Defence University	Doctor of Philosophy (Defence and Security Studies) (Ph.D.)	Yes
Zimbabwe	4 October 2019	Chinhoyi University of Technology	Doctor of Engineering (D.Eng)	Yes
Zimbabwe	8 November 2019	National University of Science and Technology	Doctor of Science (D.Sc.)	Yes

Freedom of the city

- (Zimbabwe) 9 December 2020: Victoria Falls.

== Offices ==
Political offices
New title Zimbabwe established	Minister of State Security; 1980–1988	Unknown
Unknown	Minister of Justice and Legal Affairs; 1989–2000	Succeeded by Patrick Chinamasa; As Minister of Justice, Legal and Parliamentary Affairs
Preceded by Ariston Chambati	Finance Ministers; Acting; 1995–1996	Succeeded by Herbert Murerwa
Unknown	Minister of Rural Housing and Social Amenities; 2005–2009	Succeeded by Fidelis Mhashu
Preceded by Sydney Sekeramayi	Minister of Defence; 2009–2013	Succeeded by Sydney Sekeramayi
Preceded by Patrick Chinamasa	Minister of Justice, Legal and Parliamentary Affairs; 2013–2017	Succeeded by Happyton Bonyongwe
Preceded by Joice Mujuru	First Vice-President of Zimbabwe; 2014–2017	Vacant Title next held by Constantino Chiwenga
Preceded by Robert Mugabe	President of Zimbabwe; 2017–present	Incumbent
Party political offices
Preceded by Robert Mugabe	President and First Secretary of ZANU–PF; 2017–present	Incumbent
Parliament of Zimbabwe
Unknown	Assembly Member for Kwekwe ?–2000	Succeeded by Blessing Chebundo
Preceded by Cyril Ndebele	Speaker of the House of Assembly; 2000–2005	Succeeded by John Nkomo
New title Constituency created from Chirumanzu Constituency	Assembly Member for Chirumanzu-Zibagwe; 2008–2015	Succeeded by Auxillia Mnangagwa

== See also ==
- List of current heads of state and government
- List of heads of the executive by approval rating
