= List of medical schools in Zambia =

This is a list of medical schools in Zambia.

School	Location	Affiliation	Courses	Foundation	Private/Public
University of Zambia School of Medicine	Lusaka	University of Zambia	MBChB, MMed, MPH	1970	Public
CUZ School of Medicine	Lusaka	Cavendish University Zambia	BCMP, BNMSc, MBChB, MPH		Private
Lusaka Apex Medical University	Lusaka	Lusaka Apex Medical University	MBChB		Private
Gideon Robert University School of Medicine and Dental Surgery	Lusaka	Gideon Robert University	MBBS/MBChB & BDS	2010	Private
Eden University School of Medicine	Lusaka	Eden university	MBChB,		Private
Copperbelt University School of Medicine	Ndola	Copperbelt University	BSc, MSc, MBChB, BDS, MMed, DSc	2011	Public
Levy Mwanawasa Medical University	Lusaka	Levy Mwanawasa Medical University	MBChB		Public
Mulungushi University, School of Medicine and Health Sciences	Livingstone	Mulungushi University, School of Medicine and Health Sciences	MBChB		
University of Lusaka School of Medicine and Health Sciences	Lusaka	University of Lusaka	MBChB		Private
Texila American University Zambia	Lusaka	Texila American University Consortium	MBChB, Pre-medical, MPH, BPH, MBA, BBA, PhD in management	2015	Private

== See also ==
- List of universities in Zambia
- Education in Zambia
