= Oberholzer murder =

1964 murder in Rhodesia

Oberholzer assassination
- Part of the Rhodesian Bush War and the History of Zimbabwe
- Type: Political Assassination
- Planned: William Ndangana
- Planned by: Unknown
- Target: Andrew Oberholzer
- Date: 4 July 1964
- Executed by: ZANLA
- Casualties: 1 killed

The Oberholzer murder occurred in Rhodesia on 4 July 1964, when members of the Zimbabwe African National Union (ZANU) attacked and killed Pieter Johan Andries Oberholzer, who worked as a foreman of the Silverstreams Wattle Company.

On 4 July 1964, ZANLA insurgents carried out an ambush that resulted in the killing of a white foreman from Silverstreams Wattle Company, Andrew Oberholzer, while he was travelling with his wife and family on a main road. After Mr Oberholzer's death, the attackers attempted to set his body and car alight. However, they were driven off by the arrival of another car on the scene. Police recovered two notes in which the killers threatened to "kill all whites if they don't want to give back our country".

The killing of Andrew Oberholzer had a lasting effect on Rhodesia's small, close-knit white community. The Smith Administration subsequently moved to detain the ZANU and ZAPU political leadership in August 1964. The major political leaders imprisoned were Ndabaningi Sithole, Leopold Takawira, Edgar Tekere, Enos Nkala and Maurice Nyagumbo. The remaining military leaders of the ZANLA Dare ReChimurenga were Josiah Tongogara and the highly regarded barrister Herbert Chitepo. Operating from bases in Zambia and later from Mozambique, insurgents subsequently began launching attacks against Rhodesia.
