= University of Zambia School of Public Health =

Medical school in Zambia

Coordinates: 15°26′15″S 28°18′44″E

- Type: Public
- Established: July 1, 2016; 9 years ago
- Dean: Professor Charles Michelo
- Administrative staff: 22 (2016)
- Location: Lusaka, Zambia
- Campus: Urban
- Website: Homepage

The University of Zambia School of Public Health (UNZASPH), is one of the schools that comprise the University of Zambia College of Health Sciences.

== Location ==
The campus of UZASPH is located at the Ridgeway Campus of the University, at the corner of Burma Road and Nationalist Road, in the city of Lusaka, the capital and largest city of Zambia.

== History ==
The origins of the UNZASPH date back to 1970s, when the Department of Public Health was established at University of Zambia School of Medicine. In July 2016, the university split the School of Medicine into four stand-alone schools, namely: (1) University of Zambia School of Medicine (2) University of Zambia School of Health Sciences (3) University of Zambia School of Nursing and (4) University of Zambia School of Public Health.

== Departments ==
At inception, in July 2016, the school had the following departments: (1) Department of Environmental Health (2) Department of Epidemiology and Biostatistics (3) Department of Health Policy and Management (4) Department of Health Promotion and Population Studies. At that time, there were twenty-two full-time lecturers supported by visiting lecturers.

== Collaboration ==
In 2002, Professor Knut Fylkesnes of the Centre for International Health at the University of Bergen who has been active in Zambia since the 1990s, established a working relationship with the University of Zambia. Under this arrangement, the University of Bergen offers training to qualified Zambians at Masters and Doctorate levels in Bergen, on condition that they return to Zambia after completing their education. As of October 2016, fifty-five Zambian nationals had been trained under this arrangement.

== Undergraduate courses ==
- Bachelor of Science in Environmental Health.

== Graduate courses ==
- Master of Public Health in Environmental Health
- Master of Public Health in Health Policy and Management
- Master of Public Health in Health Promotion
- Master of Public Health in Population Studies
- Master of Science in Epidemiology and Biostatistics

== See also ==
- Education in Zambia
- University of Zambia
- University of Zambia School of Medicine
