= Director of Prisons of Rhodesia =

Director of Prisons
- Coat of arms of Rhodesia
- Inaugural holder: David Charles Cameron
- Formation: 1954; 72 years ago
- Final holder: Frank Leslie Patch
- Abolished: 1980; 46 years ago

The Director of Prisons was the head of the Rhodesia Prison Service, responsible for the administration of prisons in Southern Rhodesia and later Rhodesia. The post was established in 1954 as the head of the Federal Prison Service of the Federation of Rhodesia and Nyasaland, and became head of the Southern Rhodesia Prison Service upon the Federation's dissolution in 1963. In 1965, upon Rhodesia's independence from the United Kingdom, it became the Rhodesia Prison Service. In 1980, upon Zimbabwe's independence, the office was nullified and replaced by the Director of the Zimbabwe Prison Services.

== History ==
Prior to 1954, prisons in Southern Rhodesia were administered by the Southern Rhodesia Prison Department (SRPD). On 30 November 1954, the Federal Assembly of the Federation of Rhodesia and Nyasaland passed the Prisons Department Act (49/1954), which incorporated the SRPD into the Federal Prison Service (FPS), effective 1 December 1954. This arrangement continued until December 1963, when the Federation of Rhodesia and Nyasaland dissolved and autonomy was returned to the individual colonies of Southern Rhodesia, Northern Rhodesia, and Nyasaland, the latter two of which gained independence in 1964 as Zambia and Malawi, respectively. From 1963, the service continued as the Southern Rhodesia Prison Service (SRPS). In 1965, shortly before Rhodesia's unilateral declaration of independence from the United Kingdom, the SRPS began using the name Rhodesia Prison Service.

In 1980, upon Zimbabwe's independence, the RPS was dissolved and superseded by the Zimbabwe Prison Services.

== List of directors ==
The follow list of Directors of Prisons includes those from the Southern Rhodesia Prison Service, the Federal Prison Service, and the Rhodesia Prison Service.

Name	Appointment	End of term	
David Charles Cameron	1 December 1954	1 April 1963	Federal Prison Service
David Philips	Acting: 1 April 1963	1 December 1963	Southern Rhodesia Prison Service
David Philips	1 December 1963	1964	Southern Rhodesia Prison Service
Hendrik Stephanus Bezuidenhout	29 August 1965	1968	Rhodesia Prison Service
Frank Leslie Patch	1968	1980	Rhodesia Prison Service
