= Harare Central Prison =

Prison in Harare, Zimbabwe

- Location: Harare, Zimbabwe
- Status: Operational
- Security class: Medium security (with maximum security and remand sections)
- Population: 1,622 (2013)
- Opened: 1910; 116 years ago
- Managed by: Rhodesia Prison Service (before 1980); Zimbabwe Prison Services (since 1980)
- Warden: Never Kambizi

Harare Central Prison (HCP; named Salisbury Central Prison until 1982) is a medium-security prison for both men and women in Harare, Zimbabwe. It is operated by the Zimbabwe Prison Services, previously the Rhodesia Prison Service. It opened in 1910 during company rule in Rhodesia. The current Officer in Charge, or warden, is Never Kambizi.

== History ==
=== 20th-century ===
Salisbury Central Prison was established in 1910 during company rule in Rhodesia, soon to become the Colony of Southern Rhodesia in 1923.

During the 20th-century, the prison incarcerated many black nationalists who fought white rule during the colonial period and later UDI. It also served as an execution site. The prison has been used to hold political prisoners after Zimbabwe's independence.

A 1973 study found that over a period of two months, 97% of admitted inmates were black Africans, and 50.6% were younger than 28.

=== 21st-century ===
In mid-March 2009, Harare Central Prison cut prisoners' rations by 75% in response to a food shortage. Two days later, the prison ran out of food completely.

In 2013, two Congolese inmates, living in the remand section, who claimed to practice Satanism and thrive on human blood, caused unrest among the inmates. Prison authorities worked to find means to send the inmates back to the Congo to resolve the situation.

== Description ==
The Harare Central Prison building was constructed in 1910. It is located just east of Harare city center. The property is bordered by the Morris Depot police training facility, a Zimbabwe National Army cantonment, the Presidential Guard compound, and Zimbabwe Republic Police headquarters. It is close in proximity to the State House and Zimbabwe House, and a short distance away from Central Intelligence Organisation employee housing and the residence of the Commissioner of Police.

The prison is divided into three main sections: prison cells, remand holding cells, and a workshop. The prison was designed with a capacity of 1,470, as of 2013, it houses 1,622 inmates, and often holds up to 2,000. This overpopulation means that many cells meant to hold one inmate now hold three. Though it is a medium-security prison, there is a maximum-security section for prisoners serving life sentences. The prison houses both men and women, some together with their children.

The workshop is used for rehabilitating prisoners. There, they are instructed in various fields such as auto mechanics, welding, molding, carpentry, television and radio repair, panel beating, and bookbinding. Most of the equipment and machinery in the workshop is original to the prison's founding, and some of it is nonfunctional. The prison's limited funding has prevented the purchase of new resources. In addition to the workshop, there is a school providing a primary, secondary, and tertiary education to inmates and their children. Some of the school's ten teachers are inmates themselves who have a background in education. Despite the school's limited educational resources, the Ordinary level pass rate is 69%. The prison has ablution facilities, some of which are in poor condition, and a kitchen which provides the inmates with three meals per day. Many of the prison kitchen's electric pots are not functional and some food is cooked outside using firewood. There is also a chaplain who baptizes inmates and preaches to them. There is also a prison choir made up of inmates.

The prison has a two-ward hospital with 13 beds. One ward serves as the tuberculosis unit, while the other is the "Multi-Disease Ward". The hospital also includes an opportunistic infection clinic, outpatient department, and a dental unit with modern equipment and full-time dental therapist. The prison suffers from a high mortality rate, a prevalence of communicable diseases, and shortages of food, clothing, and medicine.

== Notable inmates ==
Image	Name	Notability	Details
	Simon Chimbetu	Guitarist, vocalist, and composer	
	Kenneth Kaunda	1st President of Zambia	Transferred to Lusaka Central Prison from Salisbury in 1959
	Nigel Lamb	British air racing pilot	As a teenager, Lamb spent a night in the prison after stealing a piece of dried meat from a butcher shop
	Emmerson Mnangagwa	3rd President of Zimbabwe	
	Robert Mugabe	1st Prime Minister, 2nd President of Zimbabwe	Imprisoned at Salisbury Central Prison from 1966 to 1974
	Didymus Mutasa	1st Speaker of the Parliament of Zimbabwe	
	Simon Muzenda	1st Vice-President of Zimbabwe	Held at the prison for two years in the late 1950s and from 1964 to 1971
	Enos Nkala	Founder of ZANU	
	Maurice Nyagumbo	ZANU leader and cabinet minister	
	Ndabaningi Sithole	Founder of ZANU, Bush War militant leader	Spent six years in the prison in the early 1960s
	Edgar Tekere	ZANU leader and cabinet minister	
	Morgan Tsvangirai	Former Prime Minister of Zimbabwe	Spent two weeks in the prison
	Eddison Zvobgo	ZANU leader and cabinet minister	Was held in the prison from October 1964 to July 1965 and from November 1965 to 1971

== Notable escapees ==
The prison has seen a number of jailbreaks.

In April 1980, more than 200 remand prisoners escaped.
