= Kwekwe East =

Kwekwe East was a constituency of the House of Assembly of the Parliament of Zimbabwe between 1985 and 1990. Its first and only MP, elected in the 1985 parliamentary election, was Emmerson Mnangagwa of ZANU–PF.

== Electoral history ==
1985 election, Kwekwe East
Candidate	Party	Votes	%
Emmerson Mnangagwa	ZANU–PF	37,017	85.96
Elias Hananda	ZAPU	4,733	10.99
Kenneth Kaparepare	UANC	1,313	3.05
Total		43,063	–
