= Lacoste (political faction) =

Political faction within ZANU-PF

Lacoste, also known as Team Lacoste, is the name of a political faction within ZANU-PF, the ruling party of Zimbabwe. It is allied to Emmerson Mnangagwa, who was sworn in as president on 24 November 2017, following the 2017 Zimbabwe coup d'état.

The grouping is named Lacoste after the French clothing company whose logo is a crocodile; Mnangagwa is commonly known as 'Garwe' which means crocodile in the Shona language. Mnangagwa obtained this nickname during the independence war against white rule, and other key figures linked to the faction such as Chris Mutsvangwa have a similar background as veterans of this war.

During the years leading up to the coup and overthrow of Robert Mugabe, Lacoste and Generation 40, a group of politicians close to Grace Mugabe were rivals. The two sides frequently traded insults at political rallies.
