= Copperbelt University School of Medicine =

Coordinates: 12°58′14″S 28°38′03″E

- Type: Public
- Established: 2011
- Affiliations: Copperbelt University
- Dean: 'Prof. Seta Siziya.
- Administrative staff: 36 (2016)
- Students: ~600 (2019)
- Location: Ndola, Zambia
- Campus: Urban
- Website: Homepage

Micheal Chilufya Sata Copperbelt University School of Medicine, also known as Copperbelt University Medical School, is the school of medicine of Copperbelt University in Zambia. The medical school is the country's second public medical school, the other being the University of Zambia School of Medicine. The school provides medical education at undergraduate and postgraduate levels.

== Location ==
The school's campus is located in the city of Ndola, in proximity to Ndola Central Hospital and the Tropical Diseases Research Centre. This is about 2.5 kilometres (2 mi) west of the city centre. The coordinates of the medical campus are: 12°58'14.0"S, 28°38'03.0"E (Latitude:-12.970556; Longitude:28.634167).

== Overview ==
This public medical school is the first in Zambia to be located outside of Lusaka, the capital city of the county. It is also the first medical school in the country to offer courses in dentistry.

== Departments ==
As of October 2016, the school departments are: (1) Department of Basic Sciences (2) Department of Clinical Sciences and (3) Department of Dental Sciences.

== Undergraduate programmes ==
The following undergraduate programmes are offered: (1) Bachelor of Science in clinical medicine (2) Bachelor of Medicine and Bachelor of Surgery (3) Bachelor of Science in biomedical sciences (4) Bachelor of Dental Surgery (5) Bachelor of Science in public health and (6) Bachelor of Science in environmental health.

== Graduate courses ==
The following graduate courses are offered at this medical school: (1) Master of Science (2) Master of Medicine and (3) Doctor of Science.

== New campus ==
In 2014, ground was broken at a 52 hectares (130 acres) site off the Ndola-Kitwe dual carriageway in Ndola, near the Levy Mwanawasa Stadium, for a medical campus that includes a 500-bed teaching hospital and hostels with a capacity of 1,000 medical students. As of January 2016, the construction was nearly complete, with commissioning expected later in 2016.

== See also ==
- Education in Zambia
- List of medical schools in Zambia
