= University of Zambia Library =

Library of the University of Zambia

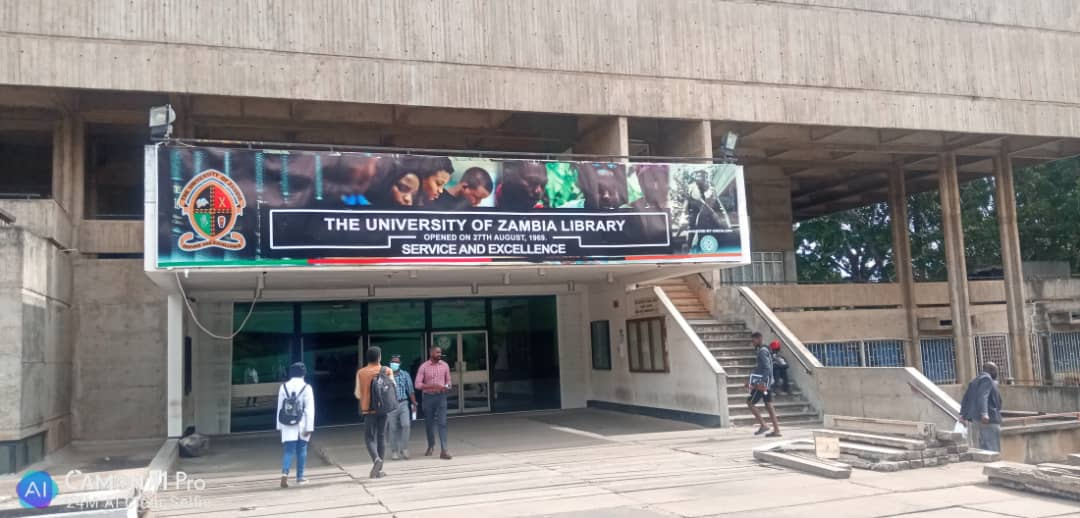
- Entrance to the library
- 15.394408°N 28.331044°E
- Location: Lufwanyama Road, Lusaka, Zambia
- Type: Academic library
- Scope: Serving the teaching and research needs of students and staff
- Established: 29 August 1969
- Branch of: University of Zambia

Other information
- Website: link

The University of Zambia Library is the academic library of the University of Zambia (UNZA) in Lusaka, Zambia. It consists of three specialised libraries: the UNZA Main Library, the School of Veterinary Medicine Library, and the Medical Library. The main library was designated a National Reference Library, and as such is open to the general public.

== Veterinary Library ==
The Veterinary Library, also known as Samora Machel Veterinary Library, offers more than 10,000 print and electronic resources on veterinary medicine, anatomy, physiology, pathology, microbiology, and parasitology, as well as information on practice management, ethics, and animal welfare. The library is meant to meet the information needs of the staff and students of the Schools of Veterinary Medicine and Agricultural Sciences.

== Medical Library ==
The University of Zambia Medical library is located at Ridgeway Campus within the University Teaching Hospital, the biggest tertiary hospital in Zambia. The UNZA Medical Library provides comprehensive access to biomedical information for students and faculty members of the Medical school, Hospital staff, and researchers; it also serves as a national reference library. There are over 40,000 printed volumes and electronic resources.
