= University of Zambia School of Medicine =

Coordinates: 15°26′06″S 28°18′46″E

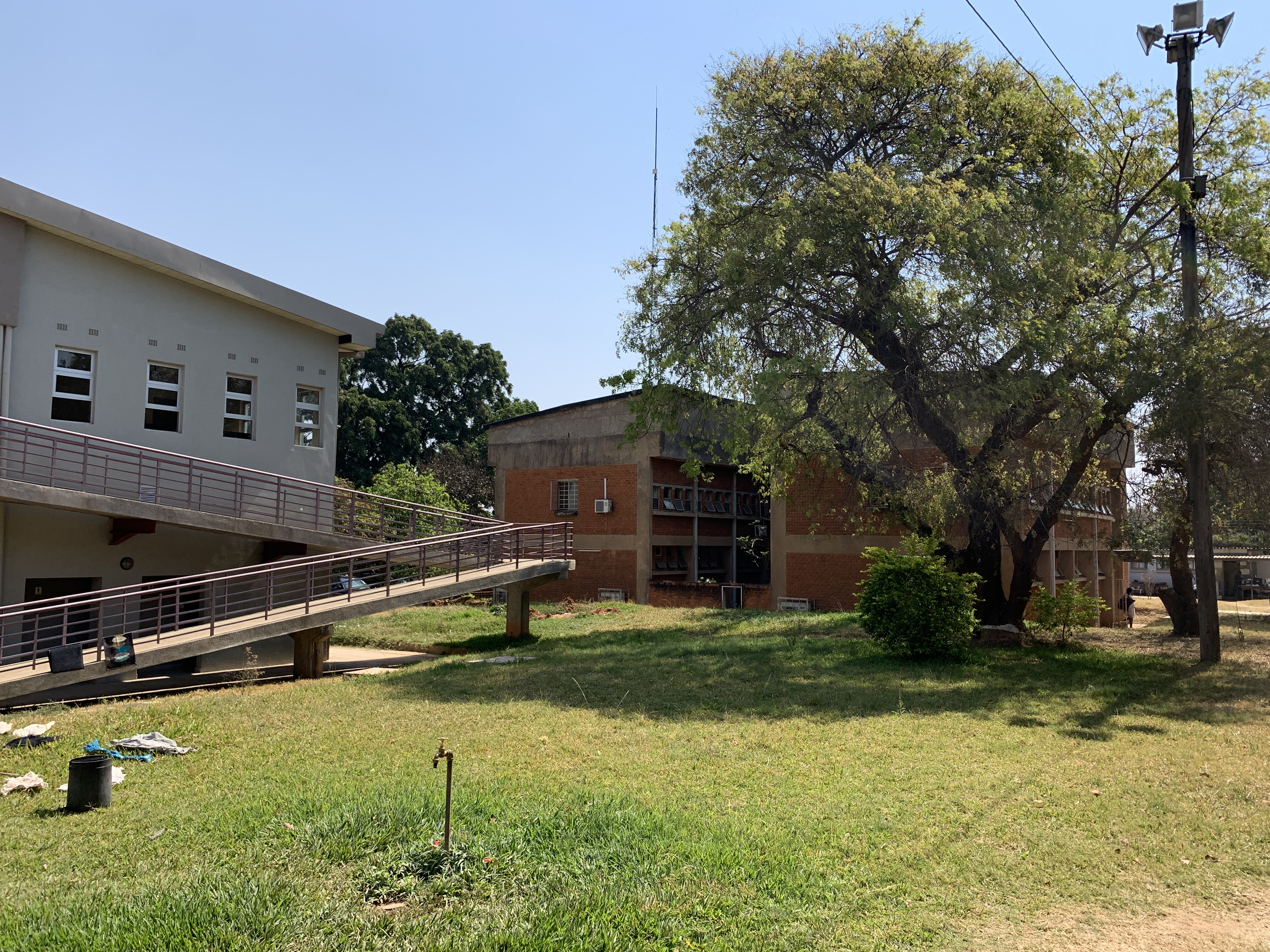
- Type: Public
- Established: 1970
- Affiliations: University of Zambia
- Dean: Dr. Fastone Goma, BSc, MBChB, MSc, PhD
- Location: Ridgeway, Lusaka, Zambia
- Campus: Urban
- Website: Homepage

The University of Zambia School of Medicine (UNZASOM), also known as University of Zambia Medical School, is the school of medicine of the University of Zambia. The medical school is the country's first public medical school, the other being the Copperbelt University School of Medicine. The school provides medical education at undergraduate and postgraduate levels.

== Location ==
The school's campus is located in the neighborhood of Ridgeway in the city of Lusaka, the capital of Zambia and its largest city. It lies in proximity to University Teaching Hospital. This is about 6.5 kilometres (4 mi), south-east of the city centre. The coordinates of the medical campus are: 15°26'06.0"S, 28°18'46.0"E (Latitude:-15.435000; Longitude:28.312778).

== Overview ==
This public medical school was the first to be established in Zambia in 1970. As at 2011, UNZA School of Medicine had graduated approximately 1,200 physicians and surgeons since its inception.

In July 2016, UNZA divided the School of Medicine into four stand-alone schools, namely: (1) University of Zambia School of Medicine (2) University of Zambia School of Health Sciences (3) University of Zambia School of Nursing and (4) University of Zambia School of Public Health.

== Undergraduate courses ==
The following undergraduate courses are offered: (1) Bachelor of Science in Biomedical Science (2) Bachelor of Medicine and Bachelor of Surgery (3)Bachelor of Science in Nursing (4) Bachelor of Pharmacy and (5)Bachelor of Science in Physiotherapy.

== Graduate courses ==
(1) Master of Medicine in Surgery, Obstetrics and Gynaecology, Paediatrics, Internal Medicine and Orthopaedic Surgery. (2) Master of Science

== See also ==
- Education in Zambia
- List of medical schools in Zambia
