= Michael Mawema =

Zimbabwean nationalist (1928-2001)

Michael Andrew Mawema
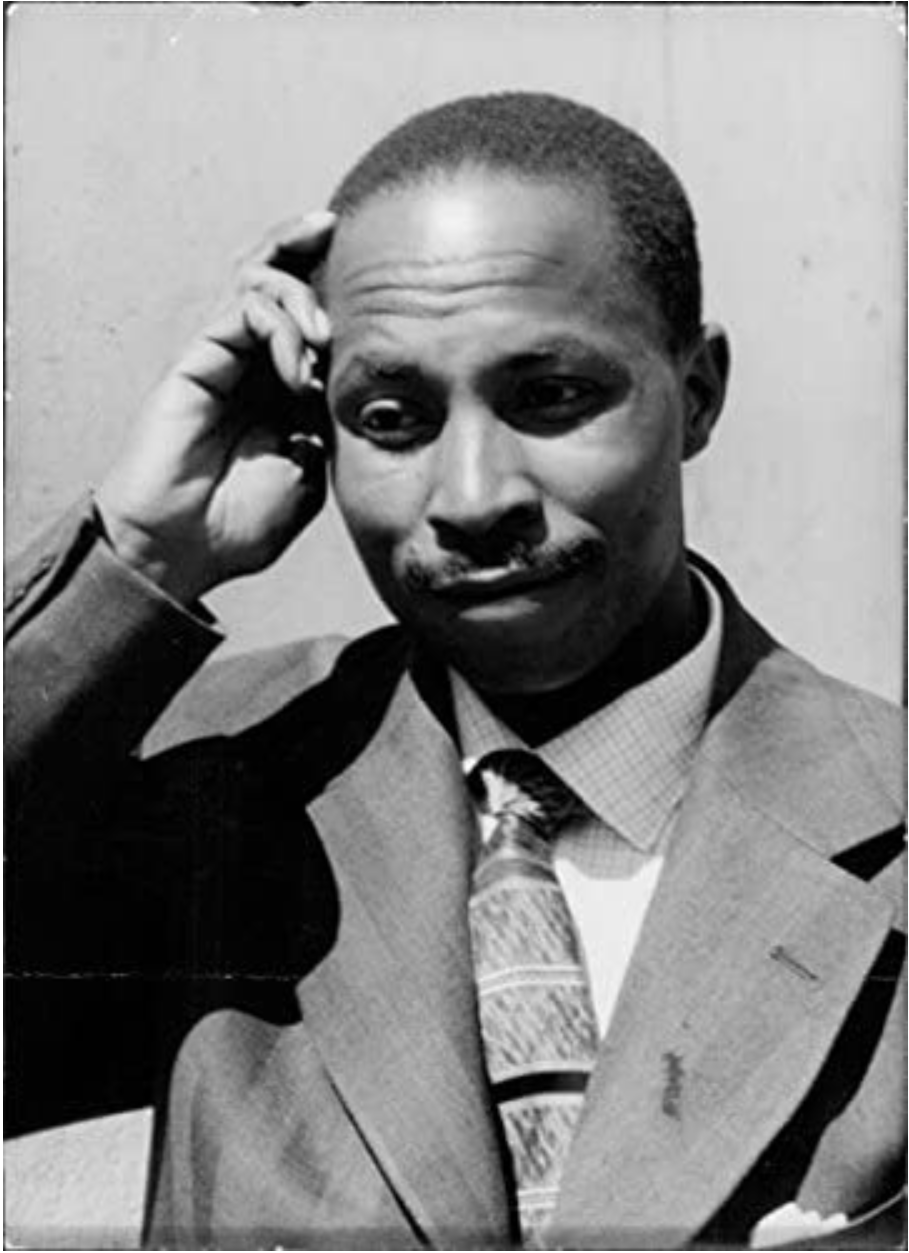
- Michael Andrew Mawema
- Born: 13 June 1928; Gutu District, Zimbabwe
- Died: 26 September 2000 (aged 72); Harare, Zimbabwe
- Known for: Naming Zimbabwe

Michael Mawema was a Zimbabwean nationalist, best known for founding the Zimbabwe Nationalist Movement and giving Zimbabwe its name.

== Early life ==
Mawema was born on June 13, 1928 in the Gutu District, Zimbabwe. His father, Chigayo, was a member of the Vagarwe clan from Mutambara who worked in the Native Affairs Department. Mawema attended the Interdenominational school in Bulawayo. In 1945, he attended the Gutu Mission School where passed Standard VI. Mawema taught Cheswingo School in Gutu and later the Mzilikazi Government School in Bulawayo.

== Career ==
Mawema's first experience with politics came in 1951 when he was private secretary to Benjamin Burombo. In 1960, at a meeting held by nationalists to decide the new name for the country, Mawema suggested the name Zimbabwe. Other names considered were Machobana and Monomotapa. Zimbabwe was made official in 1961 by Mawema's Zimbabwe national party.

== Death ==
Mawema committed suicide. It is believed he was under pressure by angry businessman who wanted him to explain why they had not been allocated land after paying deposits to the former politician and friend Ben Chisvo.
