= Leopold Takawira =

Zimbabwean politician (1916–1970)

Leopold Takawira (1916–1970) served as the vice-president of the Zimbabwe African National Union after supporting the National Democratic Party (NDP) and later the Zimbabwe African People's Union. Takawira was also known by his totem as 'Shumba yeChirumanzi'

Takawira was born at Chirumanzi, Victoria district in 1916. He obtained his education locally and at Mariannhill in Natal, South Africa. He qualified as a teacher, and after several years as an assistant teacher, was appointed headmaster of Chipembere Government School in Highfield. He gave up teaching to join Colonel David Stirling's Capricorn Africa Society, of which he became executive officer.

== National Democratic Party ==
In late 1959, upon hearing that a new nationalist party was being planned to replace the banned Rhodesian African National Congress, he applied to join the new party, the National Democratic Party. In 1960 he was elected as chairman of the Salisbury branch and member of the Central Executive. On 19 July 1960, Takawira was amongst a number of leading activists that were arrested on suspicion of belonging to the ANC. These arrests sparked unrest that became known as the March of the 7000. At a meeting on 21 September 1960, he was elected interim president in place of Michael Mawema. At the party congress in November of that year, he stood for the post of president, but lost the contest Joshua Nkomo. One of Nkomo's first acts was to appoint Takawira as his replacement as director of international relations (based in London). In 1961 Takawira sent a strongly worded cable to Joshua Nkomo condemning the acceptance by the NDP delegation of the proposals for constitutional change. This led to an emergency trip to London and to a reversal of the NDP's stance.

== ZAPU and ZANU ==
Takawira joined the Zimbabwe African People's Union (ZAPU) on its founding in 1961 was appointed secretary for external affairs. During the following year, however, he became disenchanted with Nkomo's leadership in April 1963. Nkomo suspended him in July 1963. He joined Ndabaningi Sithole's breakaway movement, the Zimbabwe African National Union (ZANU), in August and was appointed vice-president.

== Detention and death ==
He was detained in late 1964 and confined at first to Sikombele alongside Joshua Nkomo, Ndabaningi Sithole, Robert Mugabe and Edgar Tekere. After Rhodesia's Unilateral Declaration of Independence from the United Kingdom, he was moved to Salisbury Prison, where he remained until his death in 1970. His death is believed to have been caused by neglect of his diabetes by the prison authorities. In 1982, Takawira was reburied with full military honours in Harare at the national memorial monument called Heroes' Acre.
