= Josiah Tongogara =

Zimbabwean politician (1938–1979)

- Josiah Tongogara

Commander of Zimbabwe African National Liberation Army
- In office 1973–1979
- Preceded by: Herbert Chitepo

Personal details
- Born: Josiah Tongogara; 4 February 1938
- Died: 26 December 1979 (aged 41)
- Party: ZANU
- Relations: Jayne Matarise

Josiah Magama Tongogara (4 February 1938 – 26 December 1979) was a prominent Zimbabwean guerrilla commander during the Rhodesian Bush War. He was the brother of the later Zimbabwean President Emmerson Mnangagwa's first wife, Jayne. He attended the Lancaster House conference that led to Zimbabwe's independence and the end of white minority rule.

== Early life ==
Tongogara and his parents lived on the farm owned by the parents of Ian Smith, Rhodesia's last prime minister. It was where Tongogara first met Ian Smith.

== In politics ==
Tongogara was one of several rebel commanders operating from outside of Rhodesia's borders to free the country from white rule. In 1973 he took over command from Herbert Chitepo of the armed forces of the Zimbabwe African National Union. And in 1975, he put down an internal revolt by members of the Manyika tribe and consolidated that control with the assistance of Mujuru, aka Rex Nhongo. Herbert Chitepo, who may have encouraged the Manyika revolt, was killed by a car bomb that year, and a Special International Commission in Zambia found Tongogara, among others, responsible.

At the Lancaster House Agreement in 1979, Tongogara was a crucial "moderating" force, according to Lord Carrington, the then British Foreign Secretary, who chaired the talks. By then Tongogara openly favoured unity between ZANU and Joshua Nkomo's ZAPU. "Robert Mugabe referred to unity with Zapu as sharing the spoils with those who had not shouldered the burden of fighting," says Wilfred Mhanda, a former ZANLA commander who was imprisoned in Mozambique for allegedly leading an internal revolt within the party. As Lancaster House concluded, Tongogara returned to Mozambique, where ZANLA was based, to inform his soldiers of the ceasefire. Among them was Margaret Dongo, who, aged fifteen, had crossed into Mozambique to join the guerrillas, adopting the chimurenga (liberation war) name of Tichaona Muhondo ("we shall see/resolve this in the battle").

== Death ==
Six days after the Lancaster House Agreement was signed Robert Mugabe, on the Voice of Zimbabwe radio station, conveyed "an extremely sad message" to "all the fighting people of Zimbabwe": the forty-one-year-old Tongogara was dead, killed in a car accident in Mozambique on 26 December 1979.

Josiah Tungamirai, the ZANLA High Command's political commissar, relates that on the night of the fatality, he and Tongogara had been travelling with others in two vehicles from Maputo to Chimoio. Tungamirai said "he was in the front vehicle. It was dark and the roads were bad. Tungamirai's car passed a military vehicle that had been carelessly abandoned, with no warning signs at the side of the road. After that, he could no longer see the headlights of the following car in his rear view mirror. Eventually he turned back, and, as he had feared, they found Tongogara's car had struck the abandoned vehicle. Tongogara was sitting in the front passenger seat. Tungamirai told me that he had struggled to lift Tongogara out of the wrecked car. He said that as he was doing so, Tongogara heaved a huge sigh and died in his arms."

=== Theories on death ===
A CIA intelligence briefing of 28 December 1979 said Tongogara was a potential political rival to Mugabe because of his "ambition, popularity and decisive style". On the same day, the US embassy in Zambia reported, "Almost no one in Lusaka accepts Mugabe's assurance that Tongogara died accidentally. When the ambassador told the Soviet ambassador the news, the surprised Soviet immediately charged 'inside job'".

Ian Smith also said in his memoirs that Tongogara's "own people" killed him and that he had disclosed at Lancaster House that Tongogara was under threat. Smith wrote, "I made a point of discussing his death with our police commissioner and head of special branch, and both assured me that Tongogara had been assassinated".

== Legacy ==
In 1990, to commemorate the tenth anniversary of Zimbabwe's independence, streets were renamed in Tongogara's honour, including North Avenue in Harare, which became Josiah Tongogara Avenue, and Wilson Street in Bulawayo, which became Josiah Tongogara Street.

In 2005, Tongogara was honoured on a stamp of Zimbabwe.

In 2012 it was revealed that Tongogara's wife was not receiving war veteran's widow benefits.

On 6 December 2017, the King George VI Barracks, which houses the Zimbabwe National Army (ZNA) and Air Force of Zimbabwe (AFZ) headquarters, was officially renamed Josiah Magama Tongogara Barracks.
