= Benjamin Burombo =

Labor union leader (b. 1909, d. 1959)

Benjamin Burombo (1909 - 10 April 1958) was a labor union leader and black nationalist in Southern Rhodesia, now Zimbabwe.

== Biography ==
Born in Buhera in Manicaland, he worked in South Africa, and then in Bulawayo, where he formed the British African National Voice Association in 1947. Better known as the African Workers Voice Association, the union was notable for its role in the 1948 general strike and campaigned against the 1951 Native Land Husbandry Act, which aimed to privatize communal lands. Burombo died at a relatively young age, in the aftermath of an operation to remove a brain tumor. His funeral and burial at the Bulawayo Old Cemetery was a major public event, drawing as many as 15,000 people according to some estimates.
