= Willie Musarurwa =

Zimbabwean journalist

Wirayi Dzawanda "Willie" Musarurwa (24 November 1927 – 3 April 1990) was a Zimbabwean journalist.

Musarurwa studied at Princeton University from 1961 to 1962.

He opposed the policies of both the minority white government and later the majority black government. He was imprisoned for over 10 years without trial. Later, he became chief editor of Zimbabwe's leading Sunday newspaper, The Sunday Mail, but was subsequently removed from this position by orders of President Robert Mugabe for being "overly critical of the government.

== Death ==
Musarurwa died at the age of 62, while having lunch with Ambassador Steven Rhodes of the United States. He was survived by his wife, Elizabeth, and seven children.
