= Rhodesia Prison Service =

Law enforcement agency in Rhodesia

- The insignia of the Rhodesia Prison Service, featuring the Zimbabwe Bird.

Agency overview
- Formed: 1965; 61 years ago
- Preceding agencies: Federal Prison Service; Southern Rhodesia Prison Service
- Dissolved: 1980; 46 years ago
- Superseding agency: Zimbabwe Prison Services
- Headquarters: Salisbury
- Motto: Tenax et Justus; Latin: "Just and Tenacious"

The Rhodesia Prison Service (RPS) was a law enforcement agency of Rhodesia. A subdivision of the Rhodesian Security Forces, it was responsible for the administration of the Rhodesian prison system. Established in 1954 as the Southern Rhodesia Prison Department and incorporated into the federal prison service of the Federation of Rhodesia and Nyasaland, it continued as the prison service of independent Rhodesia during the UDI period. Upon Zimbabwe's independence in 1980, it was dissolved and superseded by the Zimbabwe Prison Services.

The RPS was led by the director of prisons, who was assisted by a deputy director and an assistant director. The first director of prisons was David Cameron in 1954, and the final officeholder was Frank Leslie Patch, serving from 1968 to 1980.

== History ==
Prior to 1954, prisons in Southern Rhodesia were administered by the Southern Rhodesia Prison Department (SRPD). On 30 November 1954, the Federal Assembly of the Federation of Rhodesia and Nyasaland passed the Prisons Department Act (49/1954), which incorporated the SRPD into the Federal Prison Service (FPS), effective 1 December 1954. This arrangement continued until December 1963, when the Federation of Rhodesia and Nyasaland dissolved and autonomy was returned to the individual colonies of Southern Rhodesia, Northern Rhodesia, and Nyasaland, the latter two of which gained independence in 1964 as Zambia and Malawi, respectively. From 1963, the service continued as the Southern Rhodesia Prison Service (SRPS). In 1965, shortly before Rhodesia's unilateral declaration of independence from the United Kingdom, the SRPS began using the name Rhodesia Prison Service.

In 1980, upon Zimbabwe's independence, the RPS was dissolved and superseded by the Zimbabwe Prisons and Correctional Service.

== Organizational structure ==
=== Administration and personnel ===
The headquarters of the Rhodesia Prison Service was located at the corner of Fourth Street and Jameson Avenue (today renamed Samora Machel Avenue).

#	Ranks 1975
1	Director of Prisons
2	Deputy Director of Prisons
3	Assistant Director of Prisons
4	Senior Chief Superintendent
5	Chief Superintendent
6	Superintendent
7	Chief Prison Officer
8	Principal Prison Officer
9	Established Prison Officer
10	Prison Officer
11	Chief Warder
12	Sergeant Major
13	Sergeant
14	Corporal
15	Lance Corporal
16	Warder

=== Prison system ===
The Rhodesia Prison Service administered more than 40 prisons.

Rhodesian Prison Service prisons
Prison	Location	Security type	Note(s)
Beitbridge Prison	Beitbridge		
Belingwe Prison	Belingwe		
Bindura Prison	Bindura		
Binga Prison	Binga		
Buffalo Range Prison	Chiredzi		Renamed Chiredzi Prison
Bulawayo Central Prison	Bulawayo	Medium/Remand	Commonly known as Grey Street Prison
Chikurubi Prison Farm	Salisbury		
Chikurubi Maximum Security Prison	Salisbury	Maximum	
Chikurubi Medium Prison	Salisbury	Medium	
Chipinga Prison	Chipinga		
Connemara Prison	Gwelo		Closed 1979/80
Enkeldoorn Prison	Enkeldoorn		Renamed Chivhu Prison
Fort Victoria Prison	Fort Victoria		Renamed Masvingo Prison
Gatooma Prison Farm	Gatooma		Renamed Kadoma Prison Farm
Gonakudzingwa Detention Camp	Vila Salazar		Closed 1979
Gorge Grange Prison	Fort Victoria		Satellite of Fort Victoria Prison; farm prison
Gwanda Prison	Gwanda		
Gwelo Prison	Gwelo		Renamed Gweru Prison
Hartley Prison	Hartley		Closed 1968
Katambora Reformatory			Formerly a prison
Karoi Prison	Karoi		
Kentucky Prison	Salisbury		Satellite of Salisbury Central Prison
Khami Maximum Security Prison	Bulawayo	Maximum	Held mentally ill prisoners
Khami Medium Prison	Bulawayo	Medium	
Khami Open Prison	Bulawayo	Open	
Marandellas Prison	Marandellas		Renamed Marondera Prison
Mrewa Prison	Mrewa		Renamed Murewa Prison
Mtoko Prison	Mtoko		
New Sarum Prison	Salisbury		Satellite of Salisbury Central Prison
Nyamandlovu Prison	Nyamandhlovu		Renamed Anju Prison Farm
Plumtree Prison	Plumtree		
Que Que Prison	Que Que		Renamed Kwekwe Prison
Rusape Prison	Rusape		
Salisbury Central Prison	Salisbury	Medium (Maximum & remand sections)	Renamed Harare Central Prison
Salisbury Remand Prison & Holding Centre	Salisbury	Remand	Renamed Harare Central Remand Prison
Shabani Prison	Shabani		Renamed Zvishavane Prison
Sinoia Prison	Sinoia		Renamed Chinhoyi Prison
Selukwe Prison	Selukwe		Renamed Shurugwi Prison
Tjoloto Prison	Wankie		
Umtali Prison	Umtali		Renamed Mutare Prison
Wankie Prison	Wankie		Renamed Hwange Prison
Wha Wha Maximum Security Detention Centre	Gwelo	Maximum	
Wha Wha Medium Prison	Gwelo	Medium	

== Seal and flag ==
The seal of the Rhodesia Prison Service consists of a yellow lion with a red tongue and white claws, standing on a horizontal white bar. The background color of the circular emblem in which the lion stands is light green. Above the circle is the Zimbabwe Bird, of gold color and outlined in dark brown. Rising vertically through the center of the circle is a sheathed sword inlaid with silver design and with a black point. The hilt of the sword consisted of a gold guard and pommel, and a black and white grip. Curved around the edge of the interior of the circle are the words "Rhodesia Prison Service" in white color. The lines of the circle are black, there are two white circular borders: one around the lion, and another serving as the exterior border of the emblem. Below the circle, just beneath the hilt of the sword, is the red and yellow flower of the flame lily, Rhodesia's national flower.

The flag of the Rhodesia Prison Service was a light green flag, of 2:1 proportions, with the RPS emblem in the center. The RPS emblem and flag were designed by Alan Simpson.
