= University of Zambia =

Public university in Lusaka, Zambia

Coordinates: 15°23′41″S 28°19′56″E

The University of Zambia
- Logo of the University of Zambia
- Motto: Service and Excellence
- Type: Public
- Established: 12 July 1966; 60 years ago
- Affiliations: AAU, ACU, HEA
- Endowment: $35.81 million (2015)
- Chancellor: Hakainde Hichilema
- Vice-Chancellor: Prof. Mundia Muya
- Academic staff: 879
- Administrative staff: 1,621
- Students: 30,000
- Undergraduates: 28,000
- Postgraduates: 2,000
- Location: Lusaka, Zambia
- Campus: 2 urban campuses
- Nickname: UNZA
- Website: www.unza.zm

The University of Zambia (UNZA) is Zambia's largest and oldest learning institution. The university was established in 1965 and officially opened to the public on 12 July 1966. The language of instruction is English.

== History ==
The beginnings of UNZA can be traced back to before the Second World War when the idea to establish a University in Northern Rhodesia was conceived. However, plans were halted when the war broke out and only revived after. The colonial government instituted plans to set up a Central African University College, for Africa, due to the development of higher education institutions in most parts of Africa.

The Central Africa council (CAC) appointed a committee to investigate requirements for a college for higher education and, it subsequently recommended that a college for higher education be established. A subsequent investigation into the need for higher education for Africans in Central Africa was conducted by Sir Alexander Carr-Saunders in 1952, with a follow-up report submitted in March 1953. The Southern Rhodesia Government accepted the establishment of a multi-racial University College and the commission consequently recommended that an institution be established in Salisbury. However, a minority report written by Alexander Kerr, provided a counter argument suggesting that the establishment of a higher education institution on the basis of equality between races was not feasible and thus recommended that a university for non-Europeans be established in Lusaka.

The political climate, as a result of the independence struggle, in the late 1950s and early 1960s made the idea of an all-inclusive University College of Rhodesia less attractive. As a result, plans to solicit support for the establishment of a higher education institution in Lusaka were initiated. In March 1963, the new Northern Rhodesia Government appointed a commission, the Lockwood Commission, led by Sir John Lockwood to assess the feasibility of setting up a university for Northern Rhodesia. The commission placed a lot of emphasis on autonomy and thus recommended the establishment of a university with no ties with already established universities in Britain. The report also recommended the establishment of the University of Zambia as a full-fledged university from the onset.

A Provisional Council of the University of Zambia was put in place after enactment of the University of Zambia Act, 1965. In July 1965, Douglas G. Anglin was appointed Vice Chancellor and, in October 1965, President Kenneth David Kaunda gave the assent of Act no 66 of the 1965 act.

The University of Zambia was inaugurated on 13 July 1966 following the appointment of President Kenneth David Kaunda as the first Chancellor on 12 July 1966.

Following his release from prison South African anti-apartheid revolutionary and political leader Nelson Mandela addressed students at the University of Zambia in February of 1990 in his first trip abroad and first university speech since his release.

The School of Veterinary Medicine was awarded the Japanese Foreign Minister’s Commendation for their contributions to promotion of international cooperation in the technical cooperation field on December 1, 2020.

== Campus ==
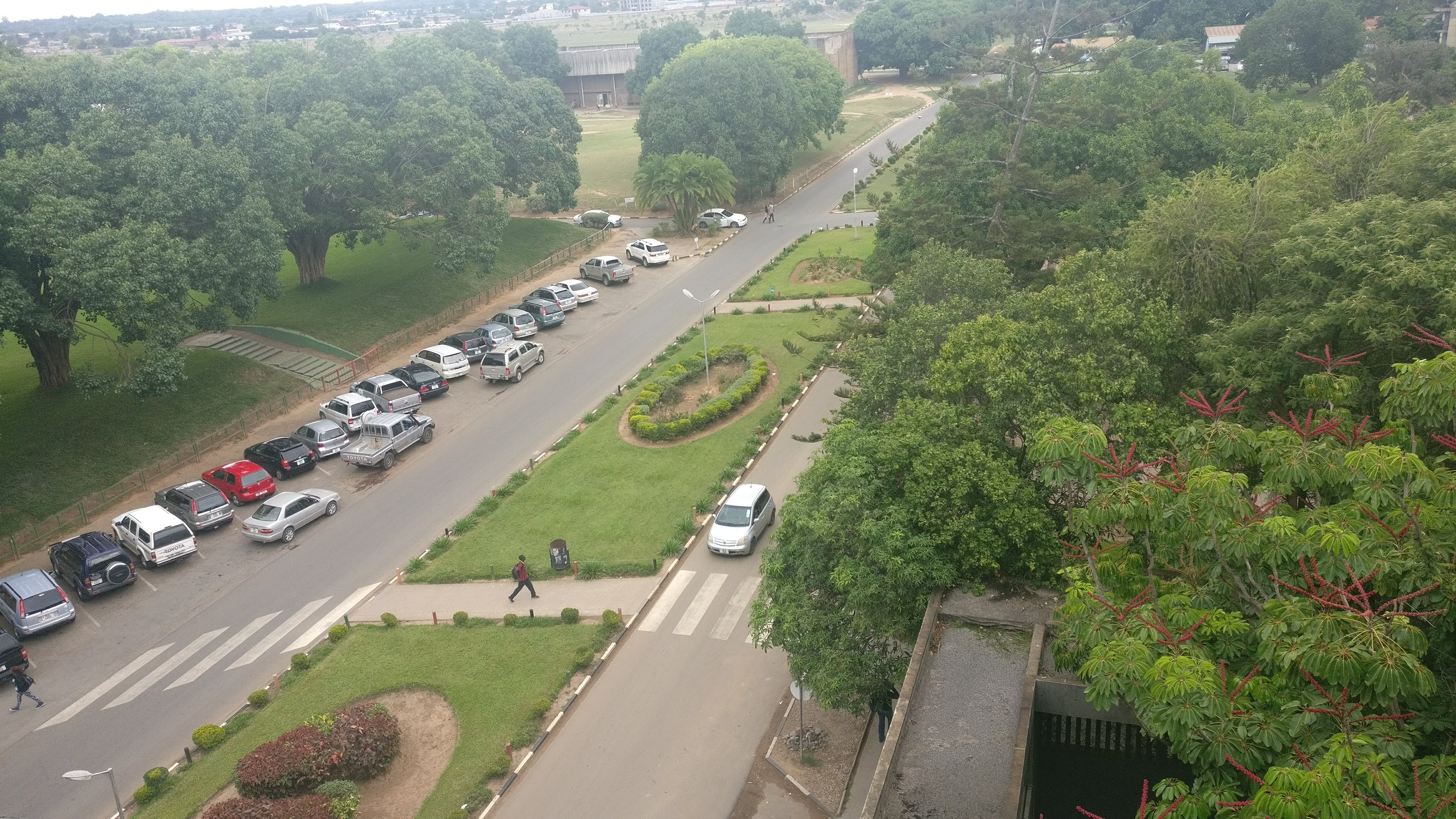
University of Zambia as seen from the School of Education

Its main campus, the Great East Road Campus, is along the Great East Road, about 7 km from the CBD. It also has the Ridgeway Campus also located within Lusaka City at the University Teaching Hospital; this campus houses students pursuing medical and pharmacological courses.

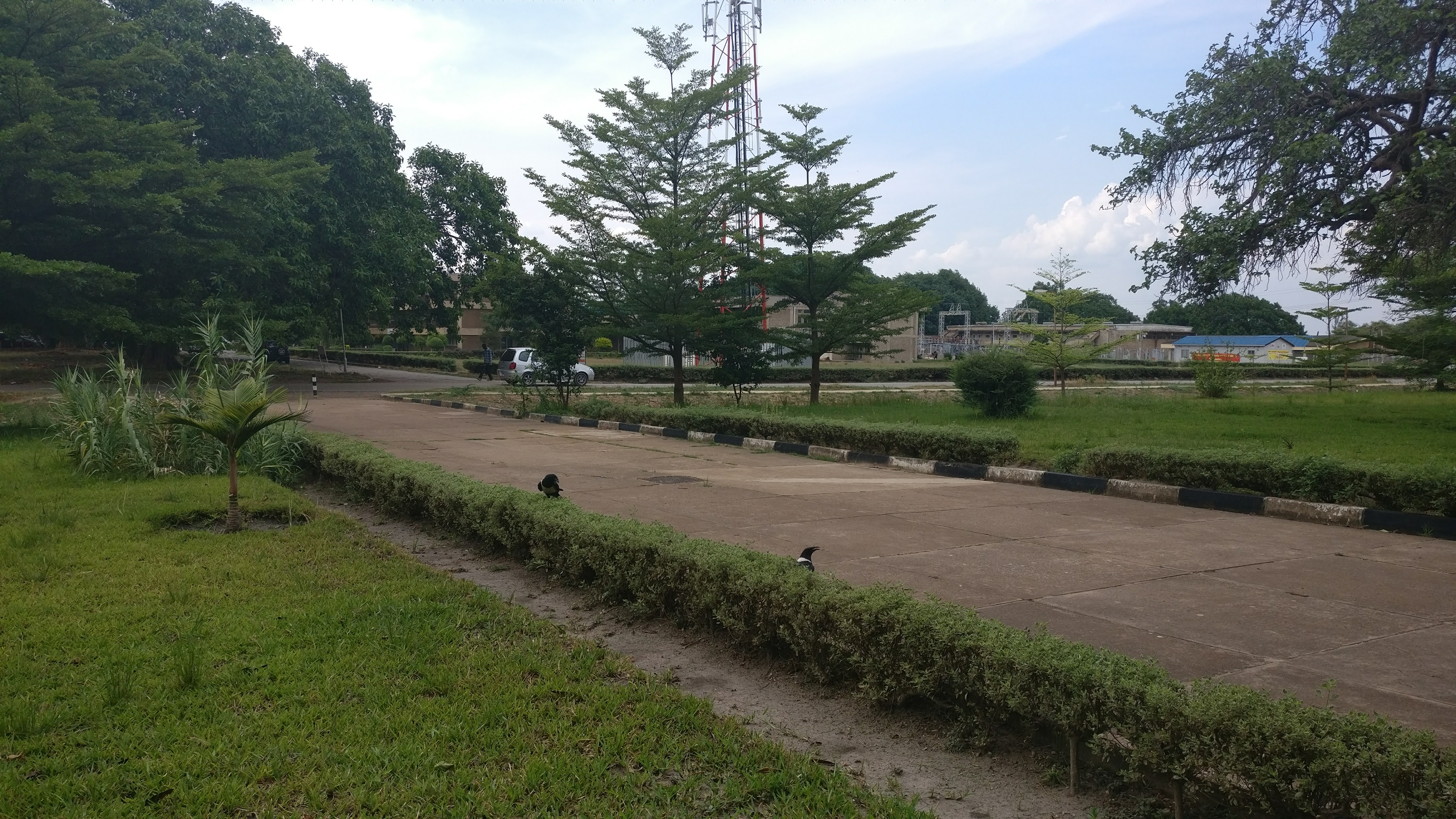
University of Zambia School of Mines front view

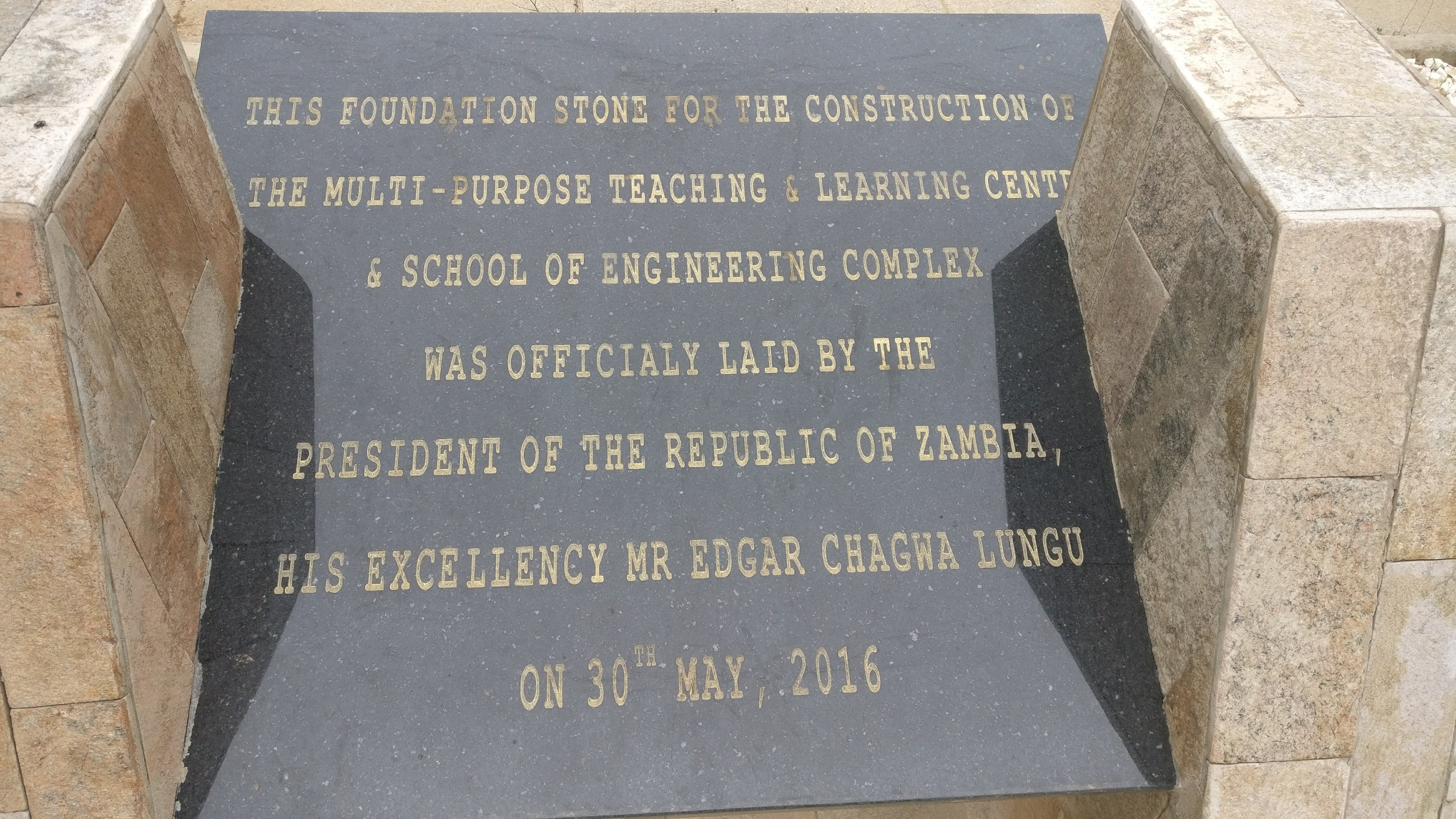
University of Zambia Multi-Purpose Teaching and Learning Centre foundation stone

== Organisation ==
The University of Zambia has over 157 undergraduate and postgraduate degree programmes. The University of Zambia is divided into the following faculties:

School of Agricultural Sciences

- Agricultural Economics and Extension Education
- Animal Science
- Food Science and Nutrition
- Plant Science
- Soil Science

School of Engineering

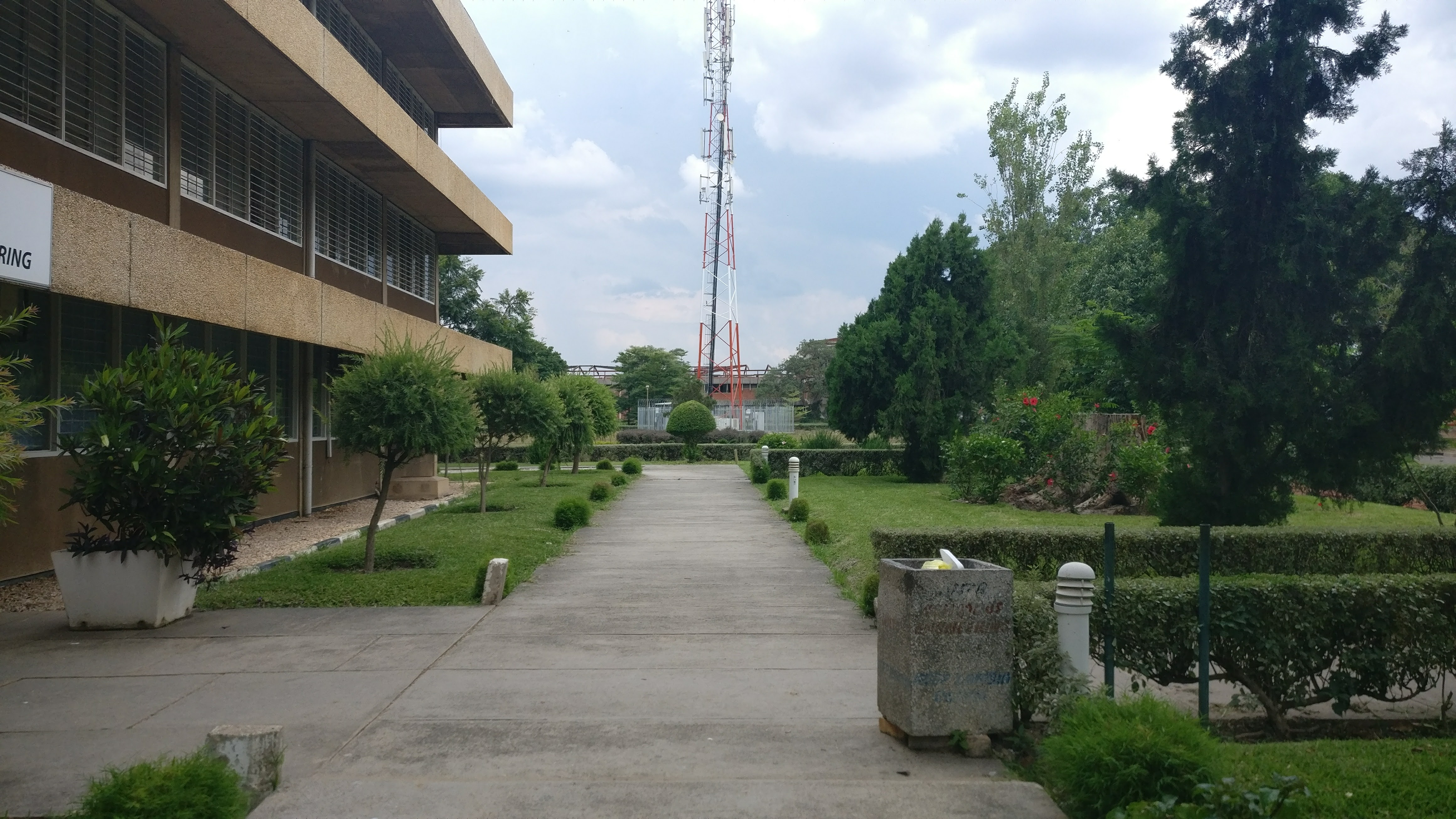
University of Zambia School of Engineering

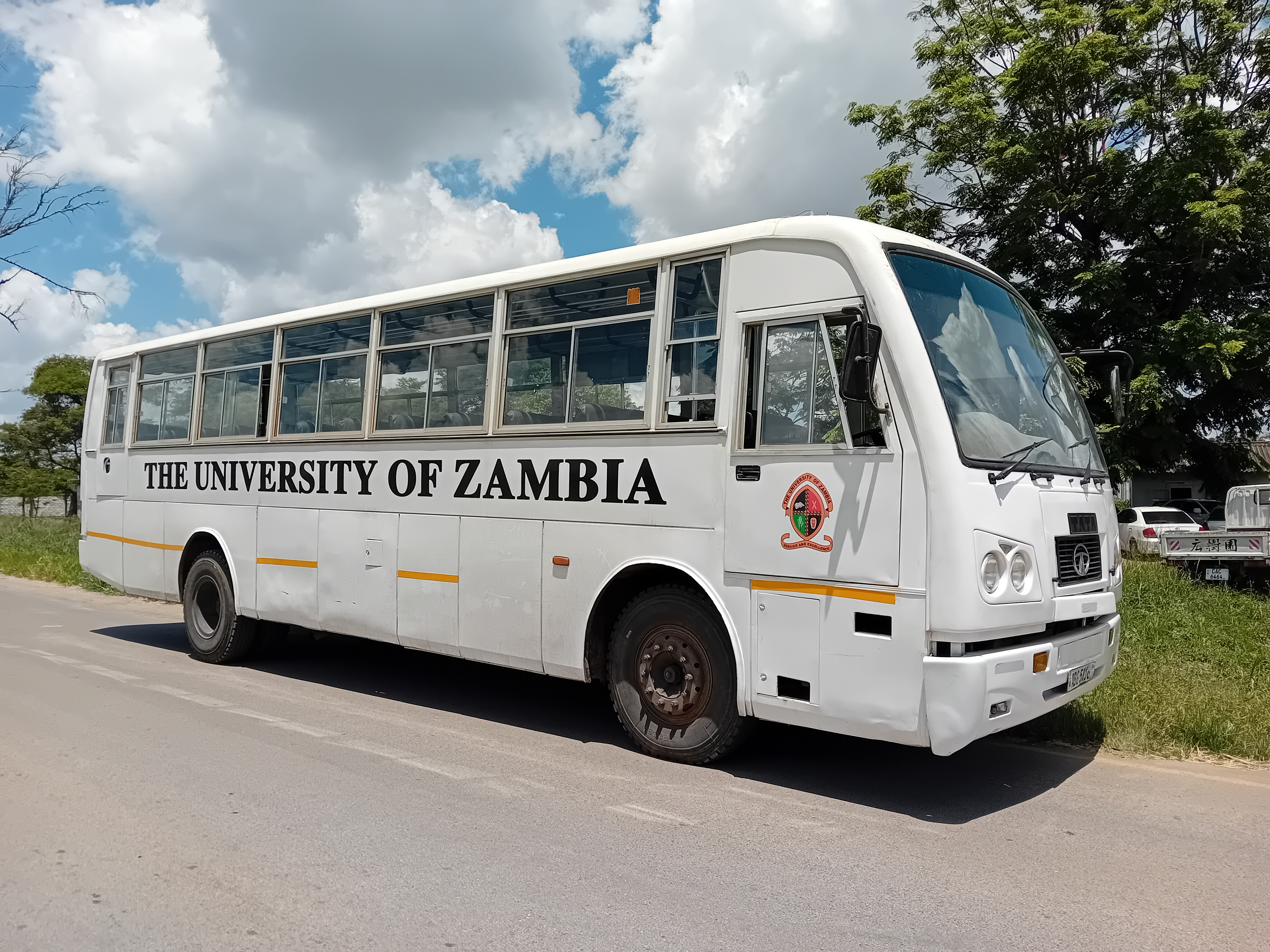
University of Zambia bus, 2024.

- Agricultural Engineering
- Civil and Environmental Engineering
- Electrical and Electronic Engineering
- Mechanical Engineering
- Geomatic Engineering

School of Education

- Adult Education and Extension Studies
- Advisory Unit For Colleges Of Education
- Educational Administration and Policy Studies
- Educational Psychology, Sociology and Special Education
- Library and Information Science
- Language and Social Sciences
- Mathematics and Science Education
- Primary Education
- Religious Studies

School of Humanities and Social Sciences

- Development Studies
- Economics
- History
- Political and Administrative Studies
- Population Studies
- Psychology
- Philosophy and Applied Ethics
- Media and Communication Studies (formerly Mass Communication)
- Literature and Language
- Gender Studies
- Social Work and Sociology

School of Law

- Public Law
- Private Law

School of Mines

- Geology
- Mining Engineering
- Metallurgy and Material Processing

School of Medicine

- Anatomy
- Biomedical Sciences
- Physiological Sciences
- Nursing Sciences
- Medical Education Development
- Obstetrics and Gynaecology
- Paediatrics and Child Health
- Pathology and Microbiology
- Pharmacy
- Physiotherapy
- Psychiatry
- Public Health
- Surgery
- Internal Medicine

School of Natural Sciences

- Biological Sciences
- Chemistry
- Mathematics and Statistics
- Physics
- Geography
- Computer Studies

School of Veterinary Medicine

- Biomedical Studies
- Clinical Studies
- Disease Control
- Para-Clinical Studies
- Central Services and Supply

Graduate School of Business

- Business Administration
- Masters in Business Administration

== Research ==
- The Institute of Economic and Social Research.
- The University of Zambia Library.
- The Institute of Distance Education

== Affiliations ==
UNZA is a member of the Association of African Universities, the Association of Commonwealth Universities, and the International Association of Universities.

== Notable people ==
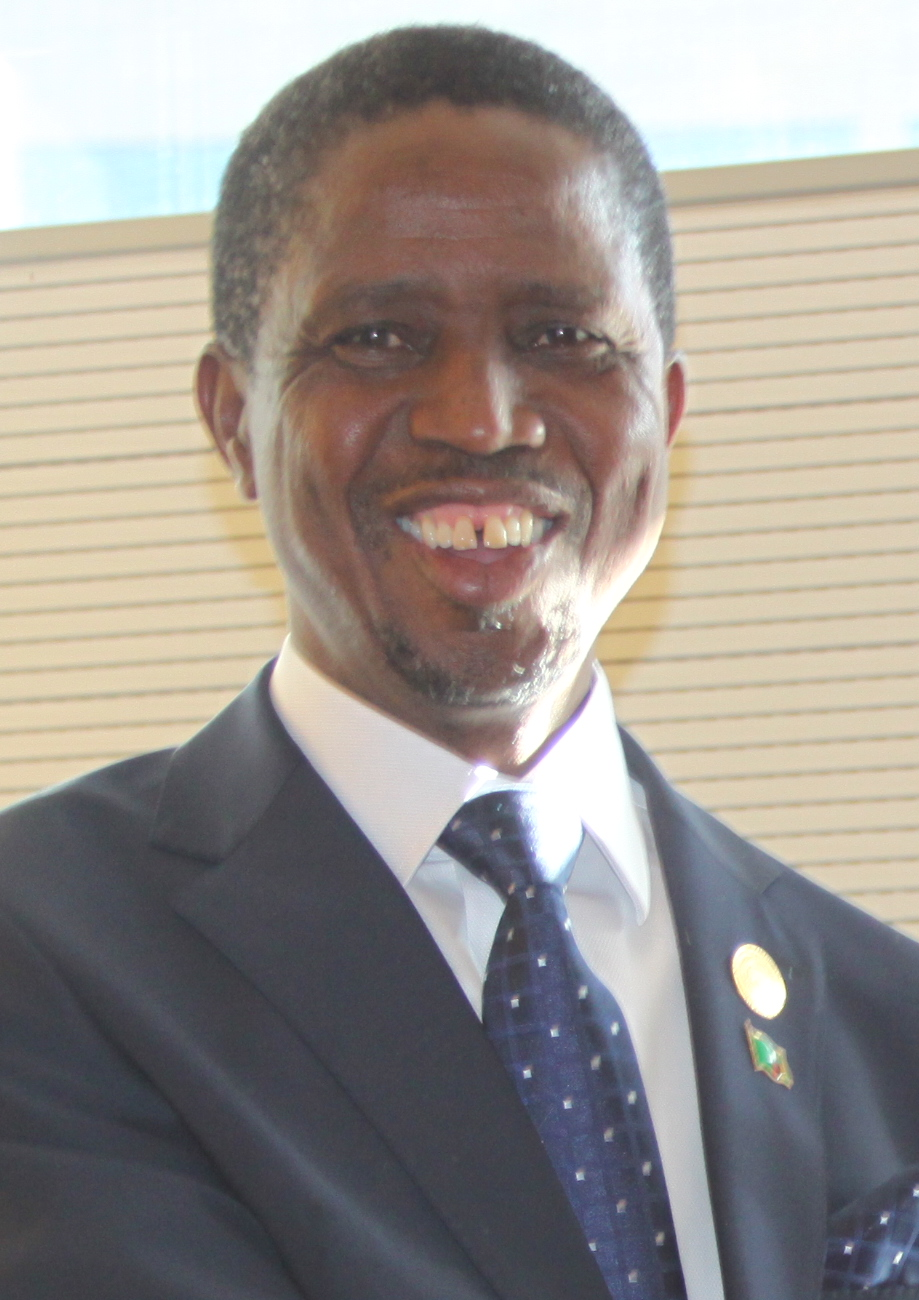
Edgar Lungu, 6th President of the Republic of Zambia

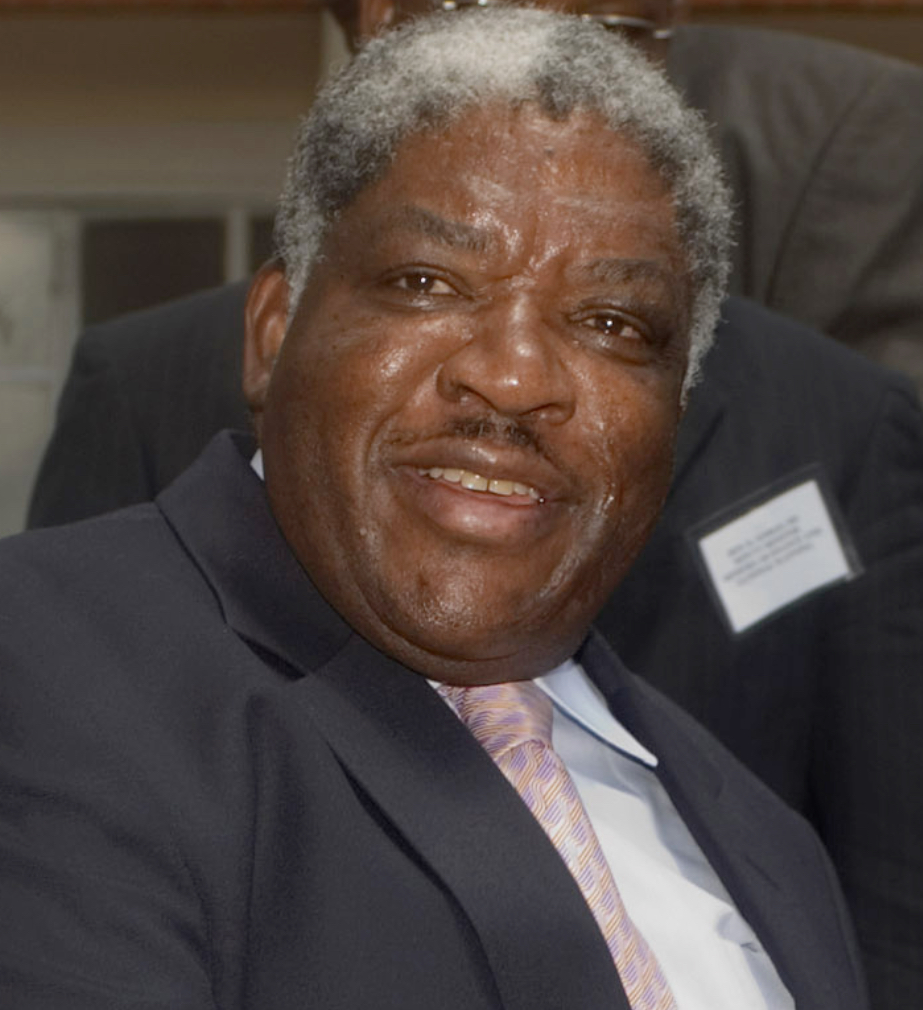
Levy Mwanawasa, 3rd President of the Republic of Zambia

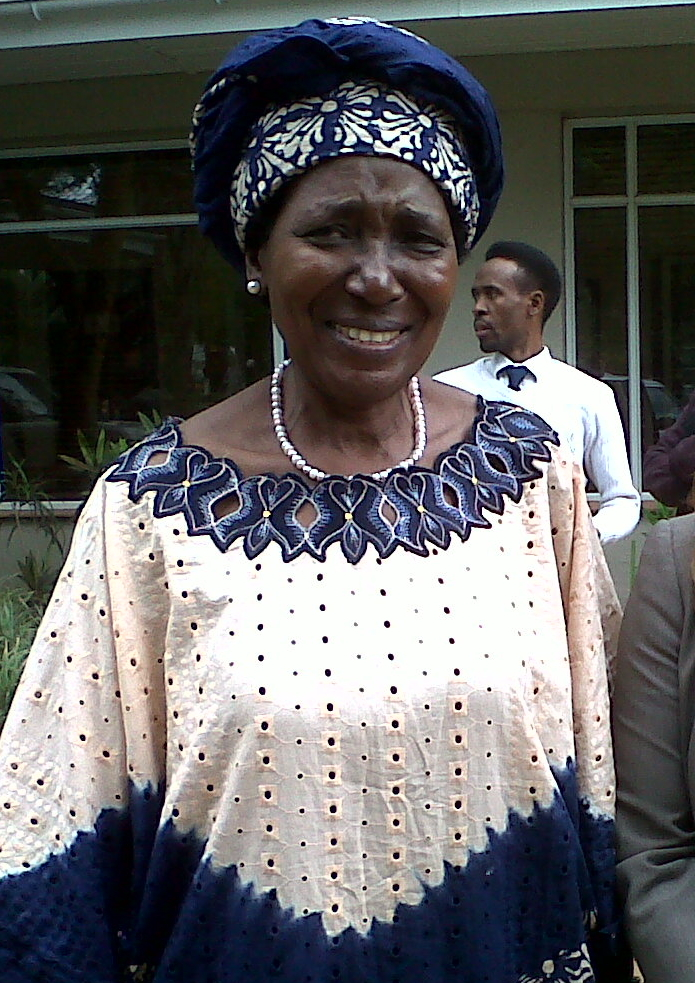
Inonge Wina, 13th Vice President of the Republic of Zambia

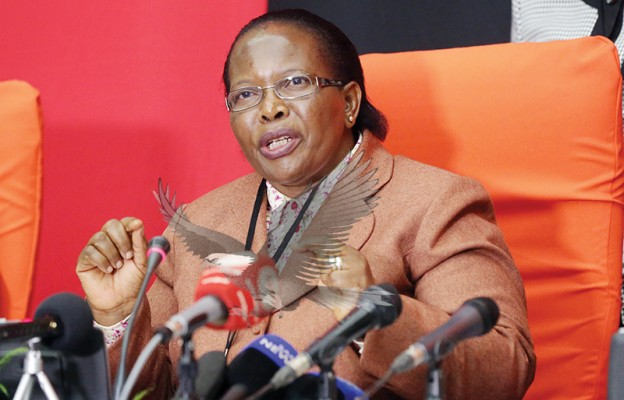
Ireen Mambilima, 7th Chief Justice of the Republic of Zambia

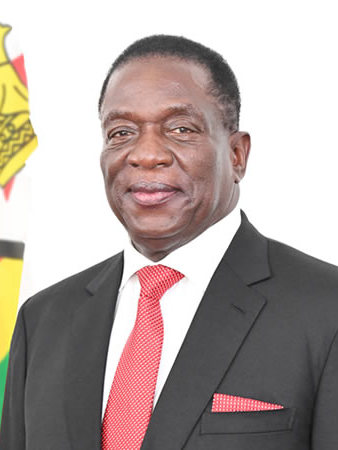
Emmerson Mnangagwa, 3rd President of the Republic of Zimbabwe

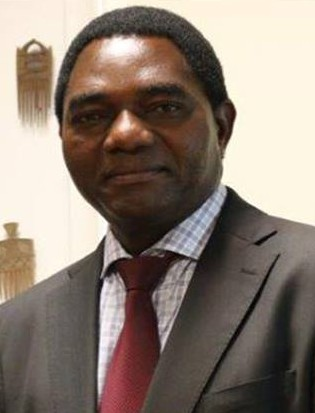
Hakainde Hichilema, 7th President of the Republic of Zambia

== See also ==
- Education in Zambia
- List of universities in Zambia
