= Higher Education Authority of Zambia =

Higher education regulatory body

Higher Education Authority
- Logo of the Higher Education Authority of Zambia
- Abbreviation: HEA
- Formation: 2015
- Director General: Stephen Simukanga
- Website: www.hea.org.zm

The Higher Education Authority (HEA) of Zambia was established under the Higher Education Act No. 4 of 2013 in order to provide quality assurance, regulation of private and public higher education institutions and registration of private higher education institutions.

The mandate of the Authority is to coordinate, regulate, supervise and monitor standards of higher education in Zambia.

== History ==
The authority was established in 2015.

== Governance ==
The authority is made up of a board, forming three committees:

- Finance and administration committee
- Registration and accreditation committee
- Standards/quality assurance committee

== Registered Private Higher Education Institutions (HEIS) ==
- Africa Research University - Lusaka Province
- African Christian University - Lusaka Province
- African Open University - Copperbelt Province
- Ambassador International University - Lusaka Province
- Bethel University - Western Province
- Blessings University of Excellence - Lusaka Province
- Brook Besor University - Lusaka Province
- Cavendish University - Lusaka Province
- Cavendish University, Longacres Campus - Lusaka Province
- Chreso University, Nangwenya Campus - Lusaka Campus
- City University of Science and Technology, Provident House campus - Lusaka Province
- City University of Science and Technology, Lusaka South Campus - Lusaka Province
- Copperstone University - Lusaka Province
- DMI-St Eugene University, Woodlands Campus - Lusaka Province
- DMI-St Eugene, Chibombo Campus - Central Province
- DMI-St Eugene, Chipata Campus - Eastern Province
- Eden University - Lusaka Province
- Evangelical University - Copperbelt Province
- Foundation for Cross Cultural University - Copperbelt Province
- Gideon Robert University - Lusaka Province
- Greenlight University - Lusaka Province
- Harvest University - Lusaka Province
- Information and Communication University - Lusaka Province
- Justo Mwale University - Lusaka Province
- Kenneth Kaunda Metropolitan University - Lusaka Province
- Livingstone International University of Tourism Excellence and Business Management (LIUTEBM) - Lusaka Province
- Lusaka Apex Medical University, Kasama Road Campus - Lusaka Province
- Lusaka Apex Medical University, Charles Lwanga Campus - Lusaka Province
- Lusaka Apex Medical University, Mutandwa Campus - Lusaka Province
- Lusaka Apex Medical University, Olympia Campus - Lusaka Province
- Lusaka Apex Medical University, Foxdale Campus - Lusaka Province
- Lusaka Apex Medical University, Tick Campus - Lusaka Province
- Management College of Southern Africa (MANCOSA)- Lusaka Province
- Mansfield University - Lusaka Province
- Mosa University College of Education and Health Sciences - Central Province
- Northrise University, Main Campus - Copperbelt Province
- Oak University - Lusaka Province
- Paglory University - Central Province
- Rockview University - Lusaka Province
- Rusangu University, Monze Campus - Southern Province
- Rusangu University, Lusaka Campus - Lusaka Province
- Rusangu University, Copperbelt Campus - Copperbelt Province
- South Valley University - Southern Province
- Southern University - Southern Province
- St. Bonaventure University - Lusaka Province
- St. Dominic's Major Seminary - Lusaka Province
- Sunningdale University - Lusaka Province
- Supershine University - Lusaka Province
- Texila American University - Lusaka Province
- The University of Barotseland - Western Province
- Trans-Africa Christian University - Copperbelt Province
- Trinity University - Lusaka Province
- Twin Palm Leadership University - Lusaka Province
- UNICAF (Zambia Limited) University - Lusaka Province
- United Church of Zambia University - Copperbelt Province
- University of Africa - Lusaka Province
- University of Edenburg - Copperbelt Province
- University of Lusaka - Lusaka Province
- Victoria Falls University of Technology - Southern Province
- Zambia Catholic University - Copperbelt Province
- Zambia Christian University - Southern Province
- Zambia Open University - Lusaka Province
- Zambia Royal Medical University - Lusaka Province
- ZCAS University - Lusaka Province

== Public Higher Education Institutions ==
- Chalimbana University - Lusaka Province
- Copperbelt University - Copperbelt Province
- Kwame Nkhrumah University - Central Province
- Mukuba University - Copperbelt Province
- Mulungushi University - Central Province
- Robert Kapasa Makasa University - Muchinga Province
- University of Zambia (UNZA) - Lusaka Province
