= Celtel Africa Challenge Season 2 =

The Celtel Africa Challenge Season 2 was the second season of telecommunications company Celtel's round-based competition involving universities from Eastern and Southern Africa. Like the first season, the second season was hosted by John Sibi-Okumu.

== Kenya ==
With the change from automatic selection for universities, sixteen Kenyan universities were entered into the preliminary elimination round, held in the University of Nairobi on 1 November 2007. The universities were:

- Africa Nazarene University
- Catholic University
- Daystar University
- Egerton University
- Jomo Kenyatta University of Agriculture and Technology
- Kenya Methodist University
- Kenyatta University
- Kabarak University
- Masinde Muliro University of Science and Technology
- Maseno University
- Moi University
- Pan African Christian University
- Scott Theological College
- Strathmore University
- University of Nairobi
- United States International University-Kenya
- St Paul's University, entered as the alternate university

After the elimination process and seeding, Strathmore were seeded first, Egerton second, Kenyatta University third and Moi University fourth. The seeded universities proceed to the competition, held in January 2008.

== Uganda ==
Eleven Ugandan Universities fielded teams to the national competition, held at. These were:

- Bugema University
- Busoga University
- Islamic University in Uganda
- Kampala International University
- Kampala University
- Makerere University
- Makerere University Business School
- Mbarara University of Science & Technology
- Ndejje University
- Nkumba University
- Uganda Christian University

The eventual winners and representatives of Uganda at the international competition were Makerere University, Mbarara University of Science and Technology, Nkumba University and Uganda Christian University.

== Tanzania ==
Ten Tanzanian universities took part in the national competition to select the country's representatives to the international competition. These were:

- Ardhi University
- University of Arusha
- University of Dar es Salaam
- Hubert Kairuki Memorial University
- Mzumbe University
- Open University of Tanzania
- Sokoine University of Agriculture
- Saint Augustine University of Tanzania
- Tumaini University
- Zanzibar University

The teams that qualified were the University of Dar es Salaam, Hubert Kairuki Memorial University, Sokoine University of Agriculture and Saint Augustine University of Tanzania.

== Malawi and Zambia ==
The 2008 challenge sees the entry of universities from Malawi and Zambia. The number of teams entered in the international competition remains the same, with the format changing to include two teams from either country.

=== Malawi ===
The University of Malawi and Mzuzu University were selected for the two slots available for Malawi.

=== Zambia ===
Eight universities competed for the two slots available for Zambian universities. Among them were:

- Australian Institute of Business & Technology, Lusaka
- Cavendish University Zambia
- Copperbelt University
- Copperstone University
- Northrise University
- University of Zambia
- Zambia Adventist University
- Zambian Open University

From these, the universities that advanced to the international competition were the University of Zambia and Copperbelt University.

== Opening Rounds ==
Match	Winners	Eliminated
1	Hubert Kairuki Memorial University	Makerere University
2	Kenyatta University	Saint Augustine University of Tanzania
3	Copperbelt University	Moi University
4	Egerton University	University of Dar es Salaam
5	Strathmore University	Mzuzu University
6	University of Malawi	Uganda Christian University
7	Nkumba University	University of Zambia
8	Sokoine University of Agriculture	Mbarara University

== Quarter-final ==
Match	Winners	Eliminated
9	Kenyatta University	Hubert Kairuki Memorial University
10	Egerton University	Copperbelt University
11	University of Malawi	Strathmore University
12	Nkumba University	Sokoine University of Agriculture

== Semi-final ==
Match	Winners	Eliminated
13	Egerton University	Kenyatta University
14	Nkumba University	University of Malawi

== Final ==
Match	Winners	Eliminated
15	Egerton University	Nkumba University
