= Lloyd Matowe =

Zimbabwean pharmacist

- Occupations: Pharmacist, consultant and academic

Academic background
- Education: B. Pharm (Hons); MSc., Clinical Pharmacology; PhD., Public Health and Health Policy; Diploma, Monitoring and Evaluation
- Alma mater: University of Zimbabwe; University of Aberdeen; Johns Hopkins University

Lloyd Matowe is a pharmacist, consultant, and academic whose work centers on public health pharmacy, pharmaceutical management, and supply chains, with a particular focus on Africa. He is the Director at Pharmaceutical Systems Africa (PSA), and serves as the Director and Dean of the School of Pharmacy at Manica University. Previously, he was the Dean and Founder of the School of Pharmacy at Eden University and the Dean of the Faculty of Pharmacy, Nutrition and Dietetics at Lusaka Apex Medical University. Prior to moving to Zambia, he was an adjunct professor of pharmacy at the University of Iowa and Kwame Nkrumah University of Science and Technology, and served as an Honorary Professor of Pharmacy Practice at the University of Zambia.

== Education and early career ==
Matowe received his Bachelor of Pharmacy degree from the University of Zimbabwe in 1995 and started working as a Teaching Assistant at the same university. Later, he obtained an MSc in Clinical Pharmacology in 1997 and a PhD in Public Health and Health Policy in 2001 from the University of Aberdeen, where he also served as a lecturer in the Department of Public Health. In 2001, he became an assistant professor at Kuwait University, and received a Certificate in Program Evaluation from the Johns Hopkins Bloomberg School of Public Health in 2002.

== Career ==
Matowe has held academic appointments at several universities, including the University of Liberia, Muhimbili University of Health and Allied Sciences, Kwame Nkrumah University of Science and Technology, the University of Zambia, the University of Iowa, and the University of Zimbabwe. He has assumed administrative roles, serving as the Dean of the Faculty of Pharmacy at Lusaka Apex Medical University from 2018 to 2019, and was the Dean of the School of Pharmacy at Eden University from 2020 to 2023. In 2024, he founded Manica University, a medical university in Lusaka, Zambia, where he served as Director and the first Dean of the School of Pharmacy.

Matowe was appointed Operations Research and Capacity Building Manager at Management Sciences for Health from 2005 to 2009, establishing Centers of Excellence for Pharmaceutical Supply Chain Management in East Africa. From 2009 to 2011, he led the Market Dynamics workstream of the Affordable Medicines Facility-Malaria at The Global Fund. Since 2017, he has served as the chair for People that Deliver Coalition as well as the Director at Pharmaceutical Systems Africa. From 2022 to 2024, he also served as the Chief Editor for the Pharmaceutical Journal of Zambia.

== Research ==
Matowe has focused on various aspects of pharmaceutical systems, including capacity development, policy analysis, pharmacovigilance, rational use of medicines, supply chain management, procurement, and quality assurance.

=== Public health policy ===
Matowe has researched healthcare policies and their implementation throughout his career. In a highly cited collaborative study, he reviewed guideline development and implementation strategies, assessing their effectiveness and costs, and proposed a framework for efficient guideline introduction, emphasizing the need for further research in healthcare decision-making. He also evaluated the quality of interrupted time series (ITS) designs in implementation research, revealing common methodological flaws and advocating for enhanced standards.

Matowe investigated the high prevalence of self-medication with antibiotics and antimalarials in Khartoum State, Sudan, identifying socio-economic factors associated with this behavior and highlighting its implications for public health policy. In a similar study conducted in Kuwait, he observed high self-medication rates among adolescents, with pain relief being the most common, and parents serving as the main source of medication information. He further assessed hypertension medication access and non-compliance in Ghana, revealing that 93% of patients interviewed were non-compliant, mainly due to unaffordable drug prices.

=== Clinical pharmacotherapy ===
Matowe's work on clinical pharmacotherapy focused on therapeutic research and healthcare quality improvement. One of his early studies investigated the correlation between thiopurine methyltransferase genotype and azathioprine toxicity in rheumatic disease patients, proposing its potential for predicting and mitigating acute adverse effects. In another collaborative study published in The Lancet, he assessed strategies to decrease radiological test requests by general practitioners. The findings revealed that incorporating educational reminders led to a reduction of about 20% in requests, whereas audit and feedback showed minimal impact, resulting in only a 1% decrease.

=== Supply chain management ===
Matowe explored approaches to improve supply chain management effectiveness in Africa. In Liberia, he worked on improving pharmacy education by developing a new curriculum with a supply chain management focus and appointing a Dean.

== Selected articles ==
- Black, A. J., McLeod, H. L., Capell, H. A., Powrie, R. H., Matowe, L. K., Pritchard, S. C., ... & Reid, D. M. (1998). Thiopurine methyltransferase genotype predicts therapy-limiting severe toxicity from azathioprine. Annals of internal medicine, 129(9), 716–718.
- Eccles, M., Steen, N., Grimshaw, J., Thomas, L., McNamee, P., Soutter, J., Wilsdon, J., Matowe, L., ... & Bond, S. (2001). Effect of audit and feedback, and reminder messages on primary-care radiology referrals: a randomised trial. The Lancet, 357(9266), 1406–1409.
- Ramsay, C. R., Matowe, L., Grilli, R., Grimshaw, J. M., & Thomas, R. E. (2003). Interrupted time series designs in health technology assessment: lessons from two systematic reviews of behavior change strategies. International journal of technology assessment in health care, 19(4), 613–623.
- Grimshaw, J. M., Thomas, R. E., MacLennan, G., Fraser, C. R. R. C., Ramsay, C. R., Vale, L. E. E. A., ... & Donaldson, C. (2004). Effectiveness and efficiency of guideline dissemination and implementation strategies. Health technology assessment, 8(6).
- Awad, A., Eltayeb, I., Matowe, L., & Thalib, L. (2005). Self-medication with antibiotics and antimalarials in the community of Khartoum State, Sudan. J Pharm Pharm Sci, 8(2), 326–331.
- Mudenda, S., Chomba, M., Chabalenge, B., Hikaambo, C. N. A., Banda, M., Daka, V., ... & Matafwali, S. (2022). Antibiotic prescribing patterns in adult patients according to the WHO AWaRe classification: a multi-facility cross-sectional study in primary healthcare hospitals in Lusaka, Zambia. Pharmacology and Pharmacy, 13(10), 379–392.
