= Professional degrees of public health =

Professional degree

The Master of Public Health (MPH), Master of Science in Public Health (MSPH), Master of Medical Science in Public Health (MMSPH), Master of International Public Health (MIPH) and the Doctor of Public Health (DrPH), International Masters for Health Leadership (IMHL) are interdisciplinary professional degrees awarded for studies in areas related to public health. The MPH degree focuses on public health practice, as opposed to research or teaching. Master of Public Health programs are available throughout the world in Schools of Public Health, Programs in Public Health, Medical Schools, and Schools of Public Affairs. MPH degrees, in addition to including a core curriculum, will usually also let students pursue a specialization in a specific field, such as epidemiology, biostatistics, or health management.

== General ==
A professional degree is one that, based on its learning objectives and types of positions its graduates pursue, prepares students with a broad mastery of the subject matter and methods necessary in a field of practice; it typically requires students to develop the capacity to organize, analyze, interpret and communicate knowledge in an applied manner.

=== Master's degrees ===
In some countries the MPH program is only available for physician graduates (MBBS, MD, DO, or equivalent). In those countries, individuals without a medical degree may enter a Master of Science in Public Health (MSPH) or Master of Medical Science in Public Health (MMSPH) programs.

==== Core disciplines ====
The traditional MPH degree is designed to expose candidates to five core discipline areas of public health:

1. Biostatistics
2. Epidemiology
3. Environmental Health
4. Health Policy and Health Administration
5. Social and behavioral sciences

=== Doctorate degrees ===
The Doctor of Public Health (DrPH) degree is for those who intend to pursue or advance a professional practice career in public health and for leaders and future leaders in public health practice. They face the particular challenge of understanding and adapting scientific knowledge in order to achieve health gain and results. This degree leads to a career in high-level administration, teaching, or practice, where advanced analytical and conceptual capabilities are required. The usual requirement for entry into this program is a master's degree in Public Health (MPH). The DrPH program develops in its candidates all competencies included in MPH programs, with increased emphasis on high-level skills in problem-solving and the application of public health concepts.

== Croatia ==
The main institution for postgraduate public health education in Croatia is the Andrija Štampar School of Public Health, part of the University of Zagreb School of Medicine. Founded in 1927 and named after Andrija Štampar, a pioneer of social medicine and one of the founders of the World Health Organization, the school has played a central role in shaping public health training and practice in Croatia.

The school offers a programme equivalent to the Master of Public Health (MPH), now formally awarded as a university specialist postgraduate degree (sveučilišni specijalist javnog zdravstva). Introduced in 1947, it is the oldest medical postgraduate programme in Croatia. The programme lasts at least one academic year and is primarily intended for physicians, though applicants from related fields are also eligible.

The curriculum consists of both mandatory and elective courses. Required modules cover areas including statistical and epidemiological methods, planning and quality management in health systems, public health interventions, community health assessment and intersectoral cooperation. Electives include topics such as public health informatics, qualitative research methods, mental health promotion, pharmaceutical policy and healthcare financing.

A similar postgraduate degree is offered at the University of Rijeka under the title Health Promotion and Addition Prevention. This programme also leads to a university specialist postgraduate qualification in public health, with a comparable academic level and professional orientation.

== India ==
In India, the MPH degree course is a two-year full-time postgraduate course or a postgraduate diploma of one year (DPH), approved by the University Grants Commission (UGC), which is open to candidates with a bachelor's degree in any discipline of arts, commerce or science from a recognized university, with at least 50% marks. Many government medical colleges, ICMR institutions like ICMR-NIE and non-governmental institutions like the Public Health Foundation of India, private universities like Azim Premji University, O.P. Jindal University and DST instituitons like Sree Chitra Tirunal Institute for Medical Sciences and Technology, Trivandrum and other non-governmental scientific and industrial research organisations such as the Institute of Public Health Bengaluru have started certificate courses, short courses and MPH courses in public health.

Initially students from health science backgrounds would opt for MPH course, but post COVID-19 the job markets have opened up where students from any discipline are encouraged and there's growing avenue for jobs across sectors. Online Masters of Public Health ( MPH) is banned and not recognized as per UGC in India.

== Malaysia ==
In Malaysia, the first MPH programme started in 1973 by the Department of Social and Preventive Medicine, University of Malaya. It was in response to an acute need of the Ministry of Health Malaysia for Medical Offices of Health to serve in the then fast expanding rural health services. The first batch of specialist graduated in 1974. Thus the programme during the first decade of its existence was aimed at producing competent public health specialist to serve the rural areas.

Currently, universities in Malaysia that offer the master programme in public health are the University of Malaya, Universiti Kebangsaan Malaysia, Universiti Sains Malaysia, Universiti Putra Malaysia, Universiti Malaysia Sarawak (UniMAS), Universiti Malaysia Sabah (UMS), Universiti Teknologi Mara (UiTM), Universiti Kuala Lumpur, Perdana University, International Medical University, RCSI & UCD Malaysia Campus (formerly known as Penang University), University of Cyberjaya, MAHSA University, Lincoln University, and Monash University Malaysia.

The programmes include Master of Public Health, Master of Medical Science in Public Health, Global Public Health, and Master of Science in Public Health (Global Health). The duration of the programmes is between 1 and 1.5 years full-time, and for part-time students, the duration will be longer. The entry requirement for the Master programme in Public Health in Malaysia is a medical, dental or pharmacy undergraduate degree, or any other science degree, and with the relevant working experience.

The Doctor of Public Health (DrPH) degree programme is the highest professional degree for individuals focusing on Public Health practice. It is intended for leaders and future leaders in public health who want a flexible career which combines high-level leadership, management and research. Their career pursuits may include applied research, teaching and/or practice in the field of health services and public health administration. In Malaysia, the DrPH programme is available from the University of Malaya, Universiti Kebangsaan Malaysia, Universiti Sains Malaysia, Universiti Putra Malaysia, Universiti Malaysia Sarawak (UniMAS), Universiti Malaysia Sabah (UMS), and Universiti Teknologi Mara (UiTM).

=== Public health medicine specialist ===
The public health medicine specialists are medical specialists in the field of public health registered with the Malaysian National Specialist Registry (NSR). The prerequisites for registration is the process of a medical degree who is registered with the Malaysian Medical Council, a Master of Public Health degree, and either a Doctor of Public Health degree or a Doctor of Philosophy degree from a medical or public health school, and with six months to one-year postgraduation working experience in Public Health.

== Zambia ==
Postgraduate education in public health in Zambia has developed in response to national health priorities and the need for trained professionals in disease prevention, health systems management, and population health. Public health programmes are offered by both public and private higher education institutions and are structured to address regional and global public health challenges.

Master of Public Health (MPH) programmes in Zambia are generally open to candidates from medical, health sciences, and selected non-health disciplines, subject to institutional entry requirements. These programmes typically span one to two academic years for full-time study and combine taught coursework with applied research and field-based learning. Core areas of study commonly include epidemiology, biostatistics, environmental and occupational health, health policy and administration, and social and behavioural sciences.

Doctoral-level programmes, such as the Doctor of Public Health (DrPH), are designed for experienced professionals seeking advanced roles in public health leadership, policy development, research, or academic teaching. Admission usually requires a relevant master’s degree and professional experience in health or related sectors.

Institutions offering postgraduate public health education in Zambia include the University of Zambia, Levy Mwanawasa Medical University, Texila American University Zambia, and Cavendish University Zambia. Graduates of these programmes typically pursue careers in government health services, non-governmental organisations, international agencies, research institutions, and academia.

== United Kingdom ==
In the United Kingdom, the MPH or MSc in Public Health is usually a one-year full-time program. Taught modules typically account for two-thirds of the MPH and a project one third. Students may be medical or non-medical graduates. Degrees vary in their content, but most cover similar areas of public health. Because of the key role played by public health practitioners in the NHS a UK MPH also often includes health economics.

Degrees that include a substantial epidemiological component are more selective and some require applicants to demonstrate ability before applying, by the completion of an online test MPH Selection Test.

=== Faculty of Public Health (UK) ===
In the UK specialist accreditation in public health is provided by the Faculty of Public Health (FPH). Specialist accreditation is through participation in a four-year program analogous to specialist training for doctors. Specialist trainees must pass two sets of examinations, demonstrably achieve certain skills and submit a portfolio of work. However specialist training in public health is now also open to non-doctors. The Faculty of Public Health is an autonomous joint faculty of the three Royal Colleges of Physicians of the United Kingdom (London, Glasgow and Edinburgh) and awards Diplomate Membership and full Membership by examination and Fellowship to those who have gained admission to the relevant professional register such as the register held by the General Medical Council.

== United States ==
In the United States, any person with an accredited undergraduate degree may pursue an MPH or MSPH and usually takes two-years of full-time work to complete. Based on the accreditation of the Council on Education for Public Health (CEPH), an MPH or MSPH is not a clinical degree. However, some states in the United States recognize MPH holders as ancillary clinical professionals (and patient-facing clinical staff) especially with regard to preventive medicine, health education, and other functions in the clinical and hospital environments. In fact, most hospital systems have MPH public health staff to study disease trends and help to combat hospital-acquired infections (nosocomial infections) and immediately determine epidemiologic trends, for example, flu outbreak tendencies, etc.

The Association of Schools of Public Health represents schools of public health that are accredited by the Council on Education for Public Health (CEPH). Delta Omega is the honor society for graduate studies in public health. The society was founded in 1924 at the Johns Hopkins School of Hygiene and Public Health. Currently, there are approximately 68 chapters throughout the United States and Puerto Rico.

=== Council on Education for Public Health ===
In the United States the Council on Education for Public Health (CEPH) accredits schools of public health and programs of public health through a formal review process.

=== Certified in Public Health (CPH) Exam ===
CPH is the only public health board certification available in the United States for public health professionals. In 2008, the National Board of Public Health Examiners (NBPHE), a United States–based credentialing board, began offering the certification exam (CPH) designed to test mastery of the core competencies of the public health professionals.

=== Recertification requirements ===
After candidates pass the Continuing Education for CPH examination, they must maintain the certification with 30 CPH recertification credits approved by the NBPHE.

The NBPHE's Board of Directors primarily represents five key collaborating organizations: the American Public Health Association, the Association of Prevention Teaching and Research, the Association of Schools of Public Health, the Association of State and Territorial Health Officials, and the National Association of County and City Health Officials. The board is dedicated to increasing recognition of the public health profession, raising the visibility of public health, and measuring and improving the competency of public health workers across the nation and around the world.

=== Council of Graduate Programs in Public Health ===
The Council of Graduate Programs in Public Health represents the accredited and emerging graduate programs across the United States that grant public health degrees and therefore prepare students for professional careers in public health. The Council encourages, promotes and supports universities, schools and colleges in developing, maintaining, and advancing graduate programs in the disciplines of preventive medicine, social medicine, community health and public health. The council is sponsored by the Association for Prevention Teaching and Research.

=== Subjects ===
Topics covered during the course include Social Epidemiology including Chronic and Infectious disease Epidemiology, Biostatistics, Environmental and Occupational Health, Gender Issues in Health, Health Policy Analysis and Health Administration, Social and behavioral sciences, Health System Management, Sexual and Reproductive Health, Health and Development, Health Economics, Public Health Nutrition, National Health Programs, Medical Anthropology, Research Methodology, Public health Ethics and Law.
