= Kesmonds International University =

University in Lusaka, Zambia

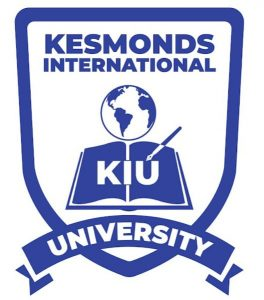
- Type: Private
- Established: 2014
- President: Prof. Dr. Atanga D. Funwie
- Location: Ngaoundéré, Cameroon; Lusaka, Zambia (among others)
- Campus: Urban, multiple international locations
- Nickname: KIU
- Website: kesmonds-edu.ac

Kesmonds International University (KIU) is a private, non-denominational, nonprofit higher education institution founded in 2014, with its primary operations in Cameroon and affiliations in several African countries, including a research institute and study centers in Lusaka, Zambia. It emphasizes entrepreneurial education and flexible learning models, aiming to make higher education accessible as a human right under Article 26 of the United Nations Universal Declaration of Human Rights. The university maintains a virtual campus to support students facing financial, geographical, employment, or social challenges, while also operating physical campuses in regions with limited internet access. KIU offers undergraduate and postgraduate programs across various disciplines, delivered through online, on-campus, and hybrid formats. As of 2025, it continues to expand its international partnerships and hosts events such as entrance examinations and joint conferences.

== History ==
Established in 2014 as a nonprofit entity (rebranded from Family of Extraordinary Students established in 2010), Kesmonds International University was incorporated in Delaware, United States, under file number 6397318, though it does not provide on-campus programs there. Its mission centers on advancing professional and personal development through entrepreneurial-focused education, particularly for underserved populations including those in remote or crisis-affected areas, full-time workers, women with newborns, and individuals with health or social disabilities. The university's virtual platform addresses barriers to traditional education, ring benefits such as flexible scheduling, home-based learning, career acceleration, skill updates, and tuition costs up to 80% more affordable than conventional options.KIU has grown its global footprint, joining the International Network for Quality Assurance Agencies in Higher Education (INQAAHE) in May 2023. In recent years, it has participated in international forums, including quality assurance conferences, and collaborated on events like the International Conference on African Affairs and the Development of Africa in Mogadishu, Somalia, in August 2025. The institution also awards honorary degrees, such as the Doctorat Honoris Causa in Journalism and International Relations given to Cameroonian journalist Charles Ebune in June 2024 by its Somali affiliate. As of 2025, KIU announced entrance examinations for August, offering 750 seats for both undergraduate and postgraduate programs.In Zambia, it operates the Kesmonds Research Institute at Plot No. 35 Kabulonga Road, Kabulonga, Lusaka.

== Academic structure ==
KIU organizes its academic programs into five main schools: the School of Health and Medical Sciences, School of Agriculture and Veterinary Sciences, School of Arts and Social Sciences, School of Business and Management Sciences, and School of Engineering Science and Technology.These schools support a curriculum focused on practical, market-oriented skills. The university also offers specialized programs, including a PhD in Theology through its affiliation with the National Theological Association, valid from 2023 to March 2026.Student engagement is facilitated through digital tools such as forums, E-Chat, the KIU network for idea sharing, and the E-Conference platform for connecting with global experts, scholars, and peers.

== Programs ==
The university provides a range of qualifications, including certificates (12–16 weeks), diplomas (12–18 months), associate degrees (18 months), bachelor's degrees (typically three years, with top-up options), postgraduate diplomas (9–12 months), master's degrees (one to two years), and doctorates (three years).Programs span fields such as health sciences, business, engineering, agriculture, arts, and social sciences, with an emphasis on entrepreneurial applications. KIU also provides scholarship programs, including partial tuition discounts of up to 50% for on-campus and distance learning in host countries.

== Accreditation and memberships ==
Kesmonds International University holds authorization from the Cameroon Ministry of Higher Education (No. 21-02881/I/MINESUP/SG/DDES/ESUP/SDA/MF, based on No. 2705/MINFI/MINESUP dated November 17, 2015) and accreditation from the Somali Ministry of Education, Culture, and Higher Education (license No. WWHTS/WHTS/06/0087/2022). It is registered with the European Union Organizational Identification number E10332569. Memberships include INQAAHE (since May 2023), the Accreditation Council for Business Schools and Programs (ACBSP) as an associate member in Region 8 (International Council), and the National Theological Association (for theology programs until March 2026). In Zambia, it is recognized by the Zambian Qualification Authority.

== Delivery modes ==
KIU's primary delivery is through a virtual campus, enabling flexible, affordable access for global students. This model supports combining studies with work or other responsibilities. Physical instruction occurs at campuses in Cameroon and partner sites in Somalia, with hybrid options available.In areas with poor connectivity, distance learning centers provide alternatives.

== International presence ==
Headquartered in Ngaoundere, Cameroon (main campus opposite Lake Dang, near the University of Ngaoundere), with a satellite campus in Bamenda (Mile 3 Nkwen, Blue Pearl Building), KIU has administrative registration in the United States and partnerships or study centers in the United Kingdom, Kenya, Uganda, Somalia, Zambia, Ghana, Romania, Nigeria, Democratic Republic of the Congo, Benin, South Sudan, Liberia, and South Africa. In Lusaka, Zambia, it operates at 35 Kabulonga Road, Kabulonga, and has a partnership with Gideon Robert University.Key collaborations include a strategic academic partnership with Global Interfaith University signed in May 2024, and joint events with Green Hope University in Somalia, such as graduations and conferences in 2025. The university employs 101-200 staff and operates under VAT registration M071712637773X in Cameroon. Other partnerships include Angaza Institute in Kenya.

== Rankings ==
In the 2022 Times Higher Education Impact Rankings, KIU ranked in the 1001+ band for Quality Education and Partnership for the Goals, and 601+ for Industry, Innovation, and Infrastructure.

== Notable alumni ==
Nasra Bashir Ali – Somali government official; Master's in International Relations and Diplomacy (2025). Charles Ebune – Cameroonian journalist; Honorary Doctorat Honoris Causa in Journalism and International Relations (2024).

== See also ==
- Higher education in Cameroon
- Higher education in Somalia
- Higher education in Zambia
- Distance education
- List of universities in Cameroon
- List of universities in Zambia
