= Rahil Hesan =

Emirati fashion designer (born 1978)

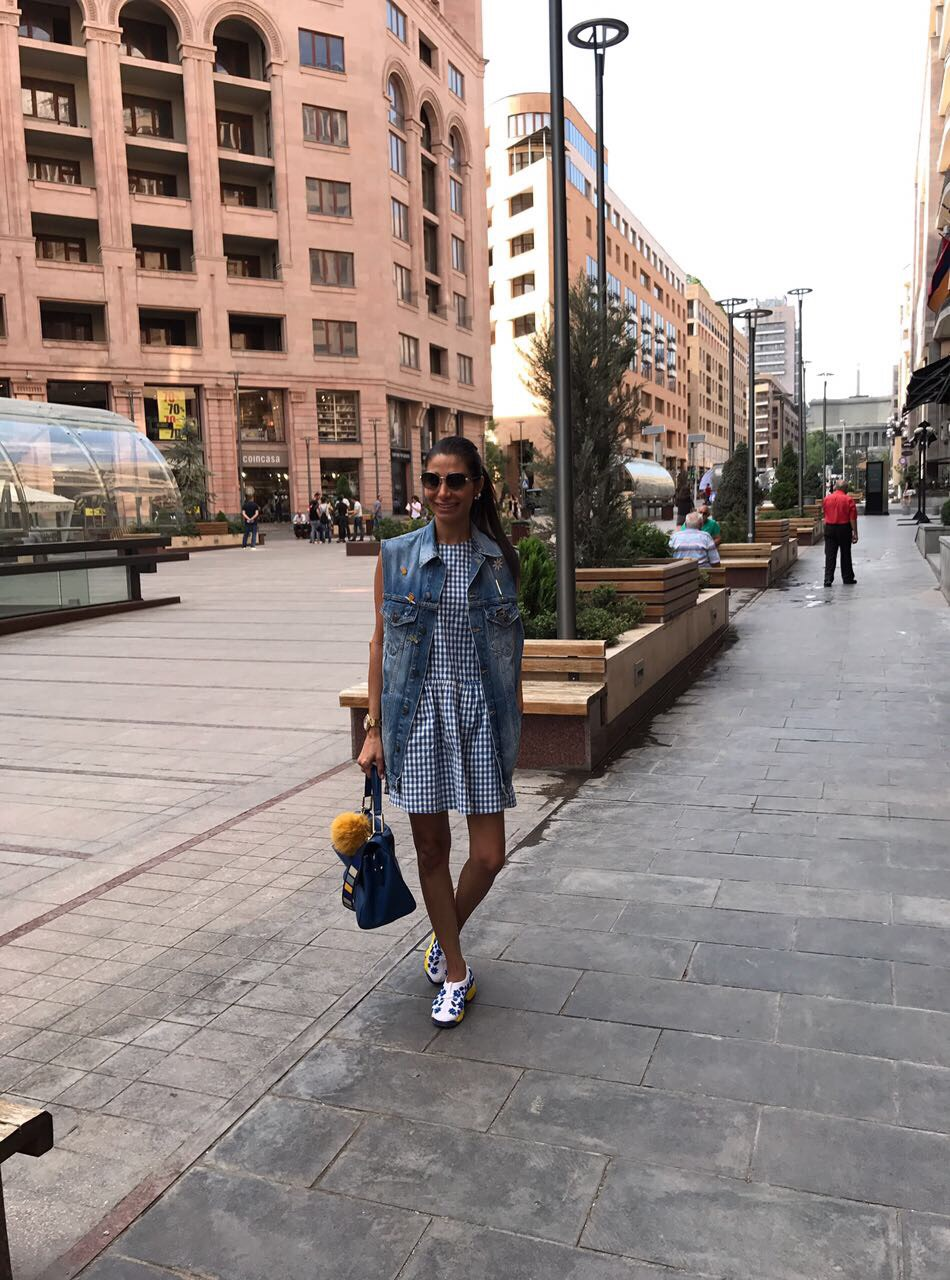
- Hesan in Yerevan
- Born: 31 August 1978 (age 48); Dubai, UAE
- Other name: Rose
- Education: Cavendish College London
- Occupations: Fashion designer and blogger
- Years active: 2005–present
- Employer: self employed
- Website: rahilhesan.com

Rahil Hesan (born August 31, 1978) is a fashion designer and fashion entrepreneur, born in Dubai. She began her career in 2005 in the field of couture.

== Education ==
In 2015, Hesan graduated from the Cavendish College London, majoring in fashion design, accessory designs, textile, color theory and fashion psychology.

== Career ==
In 2007, two years after graduating from college, Rahil founded her company Warda Haute Couture, based in Dubai. Her creations were worn by Carrie Underwood.

In 2016, Hesan participated at the Art Hearts Los Angeles Fashion Week Runway Show.
