= Kapya Kaoma =

Zambian LGBTQI rights activist

- Citizenship: Zambia
- Education: Bachelor of Theology Theological College of Central Africa Master's of Art Trinity College, University of Bristol Doctor of Theology Boston University
- Occupations: Pastor, Human Rights Defender

Kapya John Kaoma is a Zambian, US-educated scholar, pastor, and human rights defender who is most noted for his Ecological, and LGBTQI+ scholarship, particularly regarding Africa.

== Education and honors ==
After having received a 1st class Bachelor of Theology at the Theological College of Central Africa in 1997, he went on to receive a Master of Arts at Trinity College, University of Bristol in 1998 and a Doctor of Theology at Boston University in 2010, where he also serves at Visiting Researcher. Kaoma has received several honors and scholarships, including the 2014 International Human Rights Award of the Lesbian and Gay Association Mexico City.

== Activism ==
Kapya Kaoma was the first scholar to expose ties between fundamentalist anti-gay Christian groups from the US and the recent increase of postcolonial anti-gay legislation in Africa. His two publications "Globalizing the Culture Wars" and "Colonizing African values" have been influential in understanding anti-LGBTQ politics in Africa and beyond. Examples include Scott Lively, whose "Abiding Truth Ministries" has had extensive media coverage and political attention in Uganda, shortly after which Ugandan president Yoweri Museveni signed into law an anti-gay bill deemed to be one of the most repressive in current history.

Since 2009, Kaoma has published widely on the issues of cultural neo-colonialism, with particular attention on how conservative religious anti-LGBTQ+ ideology is increasingly taking root in many African societies-leading to militant opposition to sexual minorities. Kaoma spoke at The United Nations in 2009 and 2014 respectively on the plight of the LGBTI community in Africa. In 2010, Kaoma testified before the United States Congress' Tom Lantos-Human Rights Commission on Uganda's anti-homosexuality Bill.

Kaoma was Senior Research Analyst for Political Research Associates, a national think tank based in Somerville, Massachusetts. Kaoma has written for The Huffington Post, Religion Dispatches, Los Angeles Times, and the Zambian news outlet Lusaka Times. In addition to providing commentary on anti-LGBTQ+ ideology in Africa, Kaoma's works have been highly cited by many media outlets including The New York Times, The Economist Magazine, Time, The Associated Press and Mother Jones.

Kaoma's research played a critical role in a historic lawsuit filled by Sexual Minorities Uganda against Scott Lively in the U.S. Courts. As a factual witness, Kaoma was subpoenaed by the United States District Court to testify in a deposition in Sexual Minorities Uganda (SMUG) v. Scott Lively case in 2015. On June 5, 2017, Judge Michael Ponsor of the U.S. District Court in Springfield, Massachusetts, dismissed the SMUG case on jurisdictional grounds. In his dismissal, however, he wrote, “Anyone reading this memorandum should make no mistake. The question before the court is not whether Defendant's actions in aiding and abetting efforts to demonize, intimidate, and injure LGBT people in Uganda constitute violations of international law. They do.” Lively's lawyers appealed the ruling, but the court upheld it on August 10, 2018.

Writing with theologians Gerald West and Charlene van der Walt, Kaoma joined in challenging traditional church teachings on sex and marriage, writing that “Sexuality has become a new site of struggle and the ‘old’ theology does not fit, for it is founded on heteropatriarchy.” In "Christianity, Globalization, and Protective Homophobia," Kaoma explores the intersection of globalization, Christianity and African sexual politics. Kaoma guest-edited the first Special Issue in an African-based theological journal on "Sexuality in Africa" for the Journal of Theology for Southern Africa. His academic research has been endorsed by Nobel Prize winner Archbishop Desmond Tutu of South Africa and cited by high-profile scholars.

== Selected publications ==
- Christianity, Globalization, and Protective Homophobia: Democratic Contestation of Sexuality in Sub-Saharan Africa. New York: Palgrave Macmillan, 2018.
- Caring for Creation as Christian Mission, Edinburgh 2010 Series, Editor, Oxford: Regnum. 2016.
- When Faith Does Violence: Re-Imagining Engagement between Churches and LGBTI Groups on Homophobia in Africa, by Gerald West, Charlene van der Walt, and Kapya John Kaoma, HTS: Theological Studies, 2016.
- The Creator's Symphony: African Christianity, the Plight of Earth and the Poor, Pietermaritzburg: Cluster Publications, 2015.
- Raised Hopes, Shattered Dreams: Democracy, the Oppressed, and the Church in Africa (The Case of Zambia), Trenton NJ: Africa World Press, 2014.
- American Culture Warriors in Africa: A Guide to Exporters of Homophobia and Sexism. Cambridge, Political Research Associates, 2014.
- God's Family, God's Earth: Christian Ecological Ethics of Ubuntu, Zomba: University of Malawi Kachere Press, 2013.
- Colonizing African Values: How the U.S. Christian Right is Transforming Sexual Politics in Africa, Political Research Associates, 2012.
- Globalizing the Culture Wars: US Conservatives, African Churches, & Homophobia, Political Research Associates, 2009.

== Selected presentations ==
“The Role of Religion in Influencing Social and Cultural Norms,” The National Academies of Sciences, Engineering, and Medicine, Washington DC, October 29, 2015.

The Gunther H. Wittenberg Memorial Lecture 2015: “Earth-Theology and Humanitarianism: Lessons Yet Learnt,” University of Kwa Zulu Natal, Pietermaritzburg, South Africa, August 13, 2015.

“For the People of God and the Whole of His Creation,” Keynote, Mission Open Forum, Church of England Diocese of Bath and Wells, April 25, 2015.

“Africa's Sexual Battle: Retracing the Christian Right Activities in Post-Independence Africa (1960-2015. Regional Strategy Workshop on Sexual and Reproductive Health and Rights in Africa, Nairobi, Kenya, February 11, 2014.

“A Scramble for African Values: How the U.S. Christian Right is Influencing African Sexual Politics,” Working Paper, Presented at the African Studies Association, Baltimore, Maryland, 2013.

“Historical Perspectives – Our Baptismal Covenant and Mission,” Global Episcopal Mission Network Educational Institute and Annual Meeting, Connecticut, May 3 – 5, 2012.

“Mission, Theological Education and the Environment,” presented at All Africa Theological Education by Extension Africa, Accra, Ghana, October 5, 2010.

“Globalizing the culture wars: US conservatives, African churches and homophobia,”presented at the 2010 International AIDS Conference, Vienna, Austria, July 21, 2010.

== God Loves Uganda ==
Kaoma is one of the main people in the documentary God Loves Uganda. According to a review in The Washington Post, "Whatever the state of homophobia in Uganda – which Kaoma likens to an incipient wildfire – “God Loves Uganda” clearly lays the blame for it at the feet of the American evangelical movement. The movie doesn't really argue its case, preferring to stand back, in quiet outrage, as the representatives of that movement are shown with the match in their hands."

== See also ==
- LGBT rights in Africa
- Pepe Julian Onziema
