= Northern Technical College =

Technical college in Ndola, Zambia

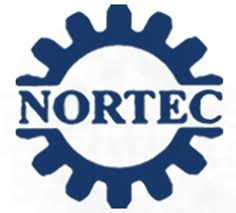
- Motto: Creative Minds and Hands
- Type: Public
- Established: 12 July 1964; 61 years ago
- Principal: Martin Kasonso
- Location: Chela Road, Ndola, Zambia; 12°57′26″S 28°37′48″E
- Campus: Kanseshi, Chela Rd
- Website: www.nortec.edu.zm

Northern Technical College, abbreviated as NORTEC, is a public college in Ndola, Zambia. It is one of the first engineering public colleges in Zambia. The language of instruction at the college is English.

== Development ==
The original aim of the Northern Technical College, founded in 1964, was to qualify people for a career in industry. In the meantime, the training has adapted to the job market. Social classes have emerged that have already completed their training at NORTEC in the second generation. The college is accredited by the state education agency TEVETA.

It maintains cooperative relations with the Copperbelt University and the University of Zambia. There are also working contacts with the African Development Bank, the Kaizen Institute of Zambia and the Swedish Volvo Group

== Programmes Offered ==
NORTEC is a quasi – government institution administered by a Management Board. The institution has currently four academic departments namely: 1.Mechanical 2.Electrical 3.Automotive/Heavy Equipment Repair 4. Applied Sciences and Business Studies.

The course portfolio includes:

- Mechanical Engineering
- Electrical Engineering
- Automotive Engineering
- Heavy Equipment Engineering
- Biomedical Engineering
- Laboratory Science
- Computer Studies
- Production Management

The courses are available on Full-time, Part-time, Open Distance Learning and Short intensive training.

== Partners and projects ==
Northern Technical College has established strategic partnerships with numerous companies over the years. These collaborations aim to enhance the institution's presence while delivering quality and advanced education to its students. Its partners include:

- Ministry of Technology and Science
- Zambia National Commercial Bank
- Africa Development Bank
- ZAMREN
- Engineering Institute of Zambia

== See also ==
- List of colleges in Zambia
- Education in Zambia
