= List of universities in Cameroon =

This is a list of universities in Cameroon.

== Public universities ==
- University of Bamenda
- University of Bertoua
- University of Buea
- University of Douala
- University of Dschang
- University of Maroua
- University of Ngaoundéré
- University of Yaoundé I
- University of Yaoundé II
- University of Ebolowa
- University of Garoua

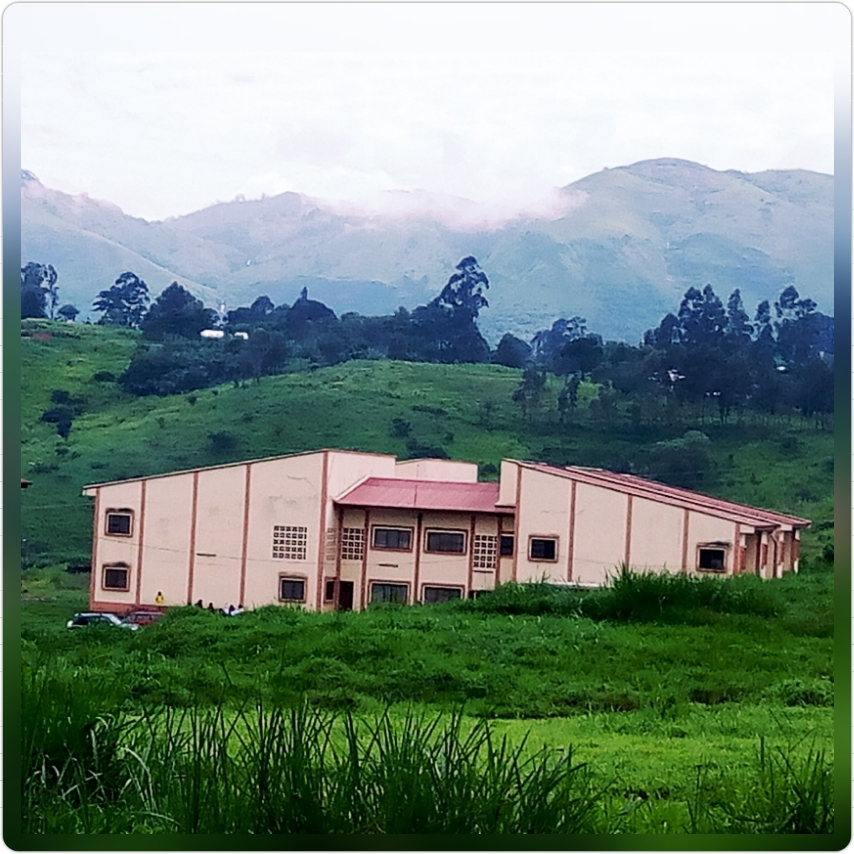
University of Bamenda, Bambili Campus

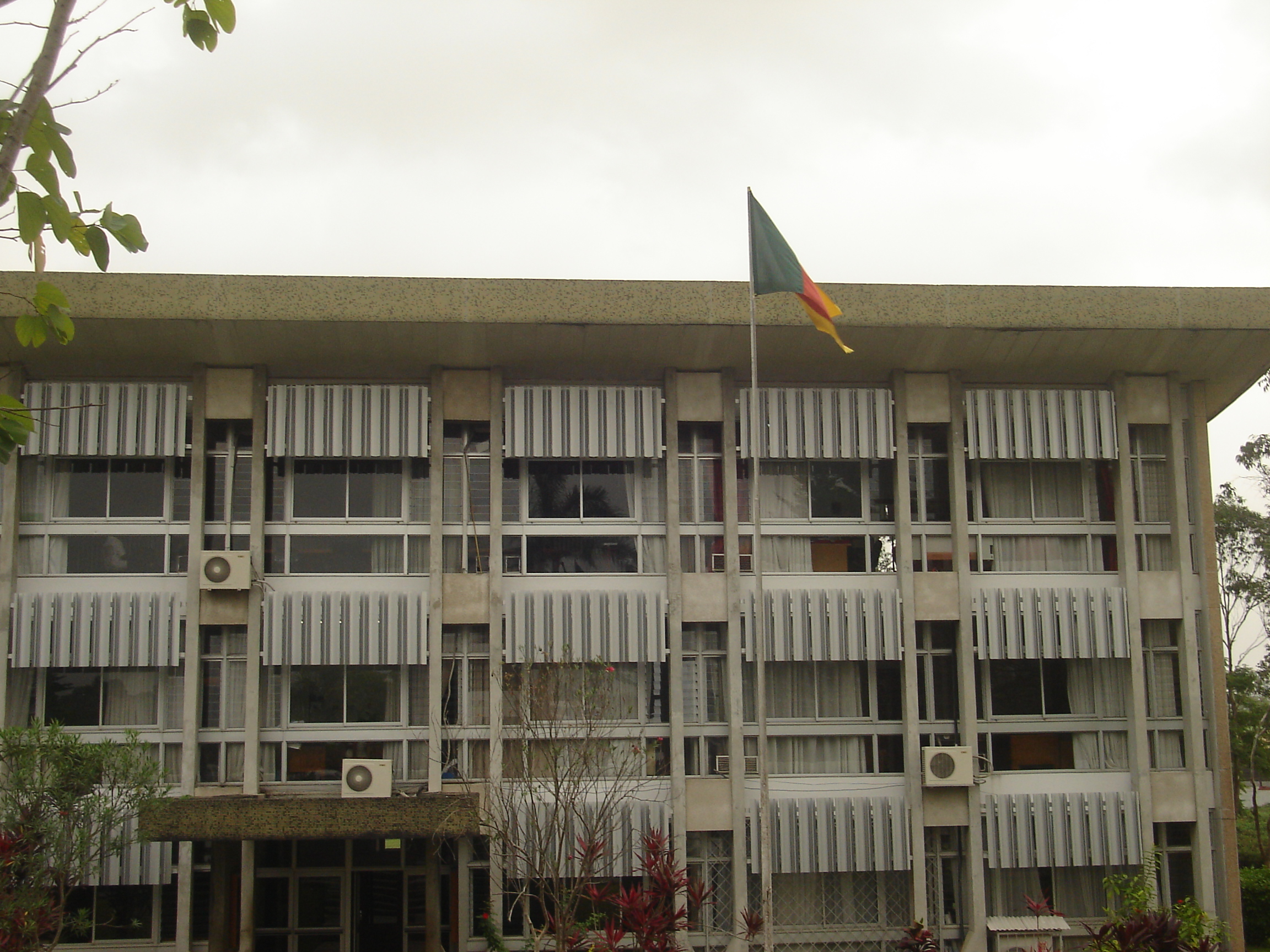
Central Administration, University of Buea

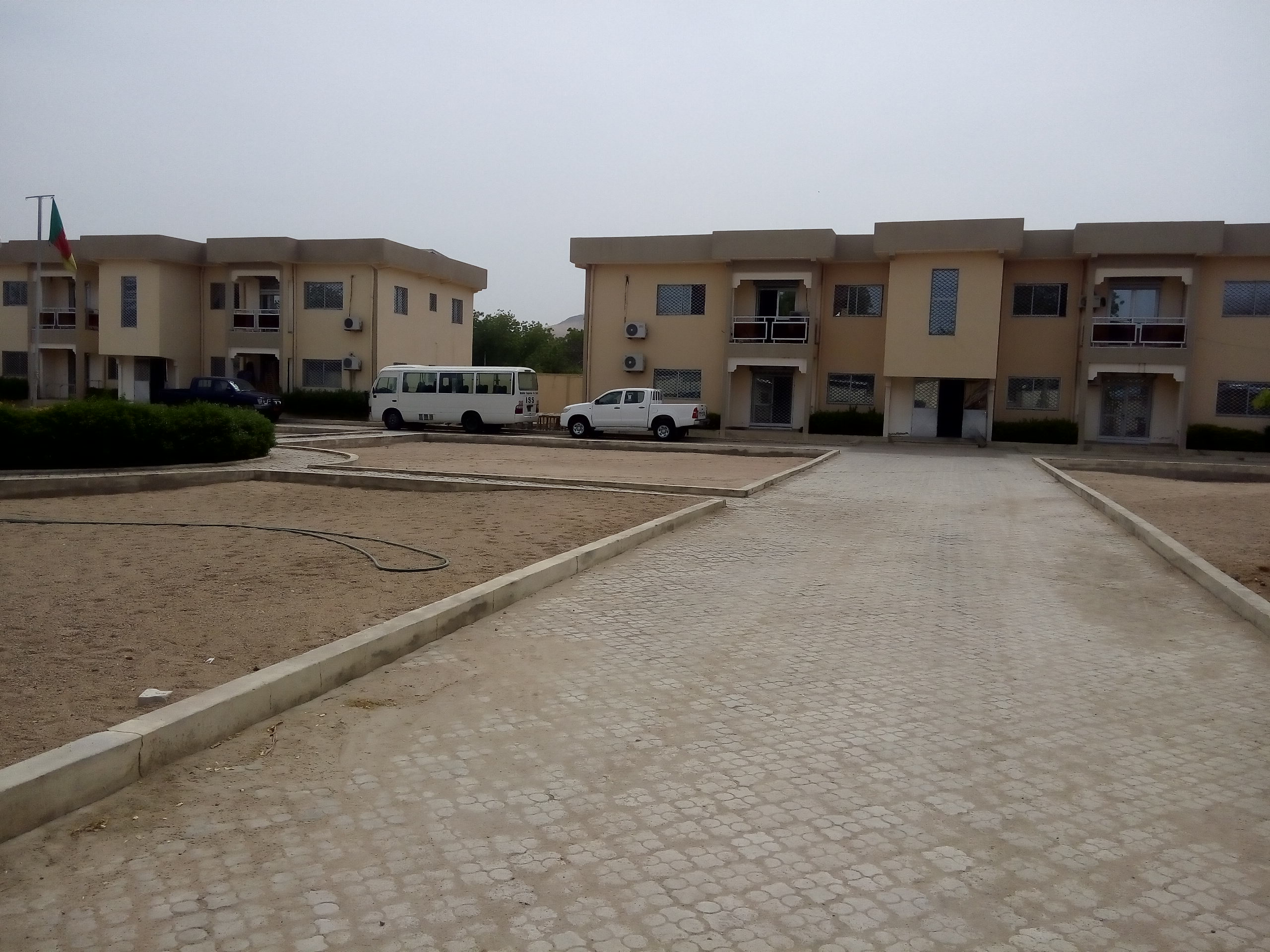
University of Maroua

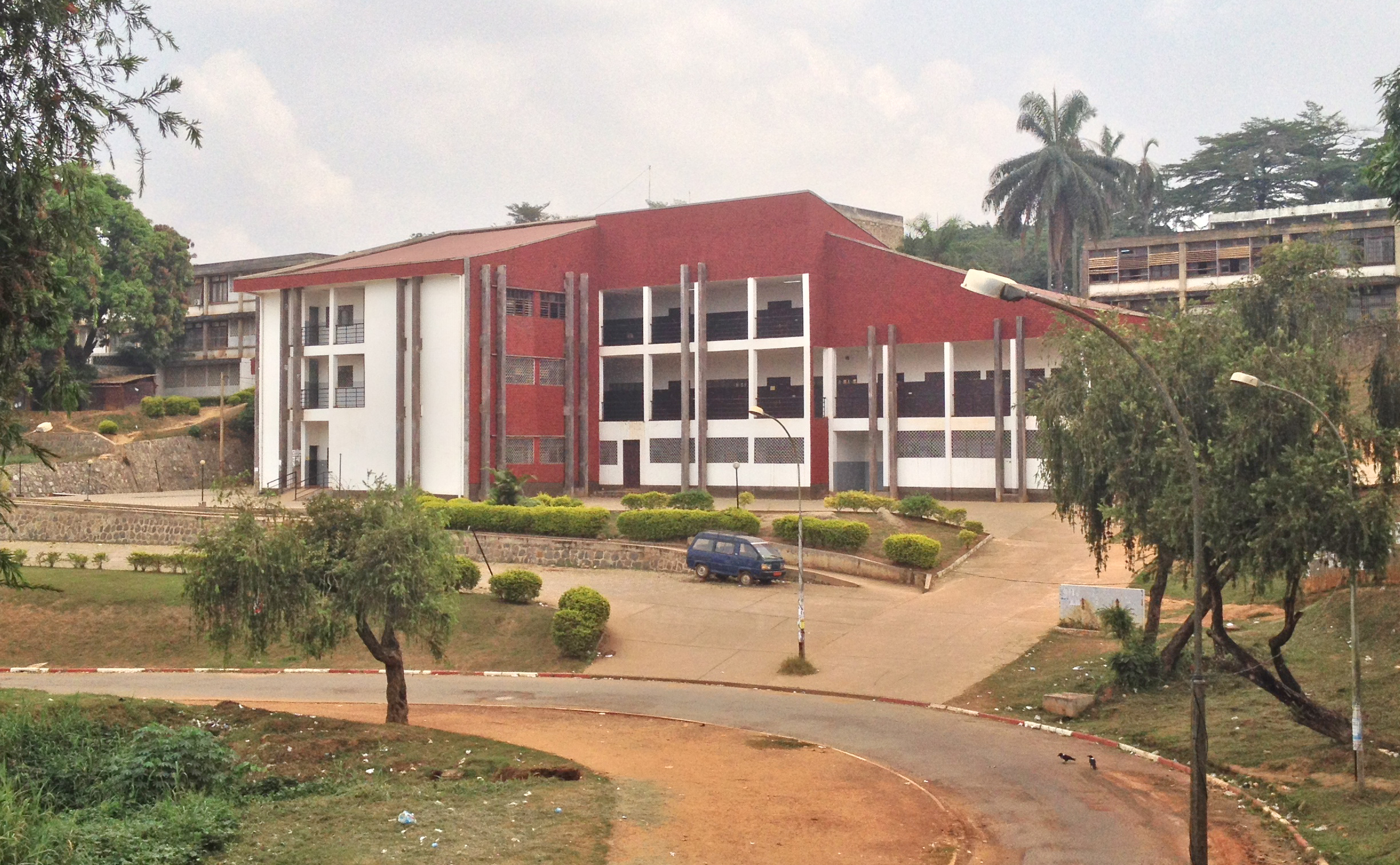
University of Yaounde 1

== Private universities ==
- Catholic University of Cameroon, Bamenda
- Catholic University of Central Africa, Yaoundé
- Cosendai Adventist University, Nanga Eboko
- ICT University, Yaoundé
- International University, Bamenda
- Saint Monica University
- University of Montagnes, Bangangté
- Kesmonds International University
- Meridian Higher Institute of Arts,Science and Technology, KUMBO-Bui Division (Meridian University Kumbo)
- Biaka University Institute of Buea (BUIB)
- Central University Institute Bamenda, CUIBa
- Ecole Nationale Superieure Des Travaux Publics De Yaoundé
- Enieg Oxford University Institute - Douala
- Fomic Polytechnic University
- HIBMAT University Institute of Buea (HUIB)
- HIPDET University- Bamenda
- Institut Agenla Academy
- Institut Universitaire du Golfe de Guinée
- Institut Universitaire Saint Jean du Cameroun(IUSJC)
- ISSAB University
- Maflekumen Higher Institute Of Health Sciences
- National Polytechnic University Institute Bamenda (Formerly known as National Polytechnic Bamenda)
- Pan African Institute for Development – West Africa
- Siantou University Institut (IUS)
- St. Lawrence University, Cameroon
- STEM University Institute
- SwissLink Higher Institute of Business & Technology
- Taniform University, Bamenda
- Technical University Cameroon, Buea
- Yaounde International Business School-YIBS
