= Cavendish College =

Cavendish College may refer to:

in England

- Cavendish College London, closed in 2011
- Cavendish College, Cambridge, a historic University of Cambridge college founded by Joseph Lloyd Brereton, which operated during approximately 1873 to 1892
- Lucy Cavendish College, Cambridge, founded in 1865

== See also ==
- Cavendish University (disambiguation), including three universities in Africa associated with the former Cavendish College London
- Cavendish Sixth Form College, a setting in Sex Education (TV series), a British comedy drama television series for Netflix
