= Paglory University =

Coordinates: 14.4530°S 28.4451°E

Paglory University is a Christian private university of education, that is located in the town of Kabwe, within the Central Province of Zambia.

== History ==
Paglory University was established in 1996 (30 years ago) as Paglory College of Education.

It was upgraded to a university in 2016 by the Zambian Higher Education Authority.

== Programs ==
Paglory University is affiliated with the University of Zambia for Secondary School Diploma Courses, and the Zambian Open University For Early Childhood Diploma Courses.

It is directed by Chancellor Prof. E. Machuta, and operated by the Paglory Ministries Int'l.

== See also ==
- List of universities in Zambia
- Education in Zambia
