= Central African Baptist University =

Private university in Kitwe, Zambia

Central Africa Baptist University
- Motto: Training the next generation of servant-leaders in Africa for Great Commission living
- Type: Private
- Location: Kitwe, Zambia
- Website: Official website

Central Africa Baptist University is a private Christian university located in Kitwe, Zambia.

== See also ==
- List of universities in Zambia
- Education in Zambia
