= Cavendish University =

Cavendish University may refer to

- Cavendish University Tanzania, affiliated with Cavendish University Uganda
- Cavendish University Uganda
- Cavendish University Zambia

== See also ==
- Cavendish College (disambiguation)
