= List of universities in Zambia =

This is a list of registered universities in Zambia. As of 2020, there were 9 registered public institutions and 54 registered private institutions in Zambia following regulations set forth by the Zambian Higher Education Authority.

== Public universities ==
- Chalimbana University
- Copperbelt University
- Kwame Nkrumah University
- Levy Mwanawasa Medical University
- Mukuba University
- Mulungushi University
- University of Zambia

== Private universities ==
- Africa University
- Atlantic African Oriental Multicultural (ATAFOM) University
- Cavendish University (Lusaka)
- Central African Baptist University
- Chreso University
- Copperstone University
- Eden University
- Evangelical University
- Gideon Robert University
- Information and Communications University (ICU)
- Kesmonds International University
- Lusaka Apex Medical University
- Management College of Southern Africa (MANCOSA) (Lusaka)
- Northrise University
- Paglory University
- Rockview University
- Rusangu University
- St. Bonaventure University
- Texila American University Zambia
- UNICAF University
- University of Lusaka
- Victoria Falls University of Technology (VFU)
- Zambia Catholic University
- Zambian Open University

== See also ==
- List of schools in Zambia
- List of colleges in Zambia
