= Cecily's Fund =

- Company type: Charitable organization
- Founded: 1998
- Headquarters: Witney, Oxfordshire, UK
- Revenue: 401,151 pound sterling (2019)
- Website: www.cecilysfund.org

Cecily's Fund is a UK-based charity that enables impoverished children to go to school in Zambia, with a particular focus on those orphaned or made vulnerable by AIDS.

The charity is registered at the Charity Commission for England and Wales as The Cecily Eastwood Zambian Aids Orphans Appeal. The charity also operates in America as a 501(c)(3) non-profit organization called "American Friends of Cecily’s Fund."

== Founding ==
Cecily's Fund was established in September 1998 in memory of Cecily Eastwood, who died in a road accident whilst working with AIDS orphans in Zambia. The charity's logo is based on the signature from Cecily's letters to her family.

The charity was created by her parents as a necessity, in order to fill the gap in education funding for children in Zambia who could not afford to attend school.

== Programmes and influence ==
As of November 2009, working in partnership with local non-governmental organisations, Bwafano, and CHEP (Copperbelt Health Education Project) the charity enabled over 9,500 children to go to primary and secondary schools by paying their tuition fees and purchasing supplies like uniforms and books. In June 2010 it was recorded that 11,000 people are being funded or have graduated as a result of Cecily's Fund, with the charity having an annual turnover of £400,000.

It also funds a Peer Health Education Programme, run by CHEP, that educates young children about how to prevent the spread of HIV, and funds Hodi to run a Teacher Training Programme that sends school graduates to local teacher training institutions. As of March 2010, the charity annually funds 36 people to train as teachers, and 50 to work as peer health educators.

== Awards ==
The charity has twice won Online Charity Accounts awards for online transparency from the Institute of Chartered Accountants in England & Wales and the Charities Aid Foundation. In 2009 it won first prize in the category "charities with income between £100,000 and £499,999" for its 2007/08 annual report and accounts, and in 2008 it won second prize in the same category for its 2006/07 annual report and accounts.

== See also ==
- Education in Zambia
