= Gertrude Mwangala =

Zambian systems engineer and academic

[Doctor]] Dr. Gertrude Mwangala Akapelwa
- Born: 1948 (age 77–78); Sesheke, Zambia
- Citizenship: Zambia
- Education: University of Zambia (Bachelor of Science in Mathematics and Education); Harvard Kennedy School (Master of Public Administration and Management); University of Liverpool (Doctor in Education)
- Occupations: Academic Administrator, ICT Infrastructure Division Manager and Software Engineer
- Years active: 1973 – present
- Known for: Academics and Engineering
- Title: Vice Chancellor of Victoria Falls University of Technology

Dr. Gertrude Mwangala Akapelwa is a former Zambian IBM systems engineer, former African Development Bank ICT Infrastructure and Operations Division Manager]] and academic, who serves as the Vice Chancellor of Victoria Falls University of Technology (VFU), an institution she helped establish in 2002.

== Background and education ==
She was born in Zambia circa 1948. She was admitted to the University of Zambia in 1969, graduating in 1973 with a Bachelor of Science in Mathematics and Education. Her Master of Public Administration degree, specializing in Public Policy and Management, was obtained from Harvard University's Kennedy School of Government, in 1997. She is also completed her thesis for a Doctor of Education degree, obtained through research, awarded by the University of Liverpool in 2020. Her doctoral specialization is Integration of Information and Communications Technology in Higher Education learning process for quality Enhancement.

== Career ==
Gertrude Mwangala Akapelwa started out in 1973, working for the Zambian subsidiary of International Business Machines (IBM), as a systems engineer. She served there for eight and one half years until December 1981. In January 1982, she was hired as the Information Technology Infrastructure and Systems Manager at the African Development Bank, working in that capacity for just short of 24 years until June 2005, based both in Abidjan, Ivory Coast and Tunis, Tunisia. In June 2002, she founded the Victoria Falls University of Technology (VFU), based in Livingstone, Zambia and became its Vice Chancellor from 2010. As of November 2017, she is the incumbent.

== Other considerations ==
She serves on several boards of public and private companies including as a non-executive director of Zambia Railways Limited. She is the owner and Chief Executive Officer (CEO) of La Residence Executive Guest House, located in Livingstone, Zambia. She previously served as the Chairperson of the Zambia Information & Communications Technology Authority (ZICTA) and a non-executive director of Zambia National Commercial Bank. She also served on the Technical Committee of the Lands Information Management System for the Zambian Government.

She has received numerous awards over the course of her career, including (a) the John Mwanakatwe Distinguished Award awarded by the Zambia Society for Public Administrators (b) the recognition and honour for being the pioneer female Computer Scientist in Zambia, by the Zambia Association of University Women (ZAUW) (c) the IBM Systems Engineering Professional Excellence Award and (d) She also received awards for Africa's Most Influential Women in Business as the Overall, Regional and Country winner in 2013, 2014 and 2015.

== See also ==
- Mizinga Melu
- Florence Mumba
- Elizabeth Muyovwe
