= Chalimbana University =

Public university in Lusaka, Zambia

Coordinates: 15.384°S 28.703°E

- Motto: Integrity, Service, Excellence
- Type: Public
- Established: 1939; 87 years ago
- Vice-Chancellor: Prof William Phiri
- Location: Lusaka, Zambia
- Campus: Urban
- Website: Official website

Chalimbana University is located in Chongwe District, Lusaka Province, Zambia. It was founded in 1939 as Jeanes Training Centre.

== See also ==
- Education in Zambia
- List of universities in Zambia
