= DMI St. Eugene University =

Private university in Zambia

- Type: Private
- Established: 2007; 19 years ago
- Chancellor: Jesuadimai Emmanuel Arulraj
- Location: Lusaka, Zambia; 15°17′40″S 28°16′09″E
- Campus: Woodlands; Chibombo; Chipata
- Website: www.dmiseu.edu.zm

DMI–St. Eugene university is a multi-campus private university in Zambia, that is affiliated with the Roman Catholic Archdiocese of Lusaka. The university is administered by the Daughters of Mary Immaculate.

== Location ==
The university maintains three campuses: The first campus to be established is the Lusaka Campus, also referred to as the Woodlands Campus. It is located approximately 15 kilometres (9 mi), north of the central business district of Lusaka, the nation's capital city, along the T2 road (Great North Road).

The second campus is in the town of Chibombo, approximately 100 kilometres (62 mi), by road, north of Lusaka, also along the T2 road.

The third campus is located in the eastern city of Chipata, approximately 568 kilometres (353 mi), by road, east of Lusaka, close to the international border with the Republic of Malawi.

== Overview ==
It is named after Saint Eugène de Mazenod. It offers diplomas, bachelor's and master's degrees as well as research programmes. The Very Reverend Father Dr. Dr.Jesuadimai Emmanuel Arulraj (J.E. Arul Raj), the founder and Chairman of the DMI-Group of Institutions, serves as the Chancellor of the university. The university is recognised and is accredited by the Zambia Ministry of Higher Education. It started to function as a university in 2007.

The university is affiliated with other institutions of learning in the DMI Group of Institutions, in other countries, including India, Tanzania, Malawi and South Sudan.

== History ==
In 2014, the university signed a contract with the Zambian government, and is participating in a nationwide Zambian government programme to train 2,000 mathematics and science teachers. The university is also participating in upgrading the qualifications of elementary and secondary educators in Zambia.

== Courses ==
=== Diploma courses ===
The following diploma courses are on offer, as of May 2020.

- Diploma in Computer Science
- Diploma in Hardware and Networking
- Diploma in Information Technology
- Diploma in Animation and Multimedia
- Diploma in Secondary Education
- Diploma in Business Administration
- Diploma in Sales and Marketing
- Diploma in Banking and Finance
- Diploma in Accounting and Finance
- Diploma in Monitoring and Evaluation

=== Undergraduate courses ===
The undergraduate courses on offer include the following.

- Bachelor of Science in Food and Nutrition
- Bachelor of Science in Electronics and Communication
- Bachelor of Science in Renewable Energy
- Bachelor of Science in Visual Communication
- Bachelor of Science in Home Science
- Bachelor of Science in Secondary Education
- Bachelor of Science in Journalism and Mass Communication
- Bachelor of Science in Graphics and Multimedia
- Bachelor of Business Administration
- Bachelor of Commerce
- Bachelor of Computer Science

=== Postgraduate courses ===
The following postgraduate courses are on offer at the university as of May 2020.

- Master of Business Administration
- Doctor of Philosophy in selected fields.

== See also ==
- Education in Zambia
