= Mukuba University =

Public university in Zambia

Coordinates: 12.7228°S 28.1529°E

- Motto: Education Freedom Responsibility
- Type: Public
- Established: 1974; 52 years ago
- Vice-Chancellor: Frank P Tailoka
- Administrative staff: Approved establishment: 205
- Students: 2500
- Location: Kitwe, Zambia
- Campus: off Chingola -Kitwe Dual Carriageway, Itimpi
- Website: www.mukuba.edu.zm

Mukuba University is a public university in Garneton (Itimpi), Kitwe, Zambia. The Mukuba University, formerly Copperbelt Secondary Teachers College (COSETCO), was established in 1974 by the Ministry of Education to train Teachers of Science for deployment in secondary schools around the country. Since its inception, COSETCO as an institution trained teachers of mathematics, natural sciences, and home economics.

== Academic Reorganization ==
In 2008 the institution started offering bachelor's degrees and four schools were established which were reorganised into three by 2018 in the restructuring process: 1. School of Education offering various courses, including psychology, philosophy, sociology, special education and communication skills. 2. The School of Applied Science and Technology offering majors in nutritional sciences, as well as clothing and textile sciences. 3. The School of Mathematical and Natural Sciences offering degrees in mathematics, computer science, geography, biology, chemistry, physics and agriculture sciences. All programmes run through full time/ regular mode, as well as via open and distance learning (ODL) mode.

== ICT ==
The university has established a dedicated Centre for ICT, the Centre for Information Communication Technology. The Unit has four sections, namely 1. Networking Section, 2. Training Section, 3. Software Development Section and 4. Support and Consultancy Section. The University Library The university library is the principal information provider for all students and staff.

== See also ==
- Education in Zambia
- List of universities in Zambia
