= Levy Mwanawasa Medical University =

Public university in Lusaka, Zambia

- Type: Public
- Established: 2019; 7 years ago
- Students: 9,000 (Expected)
- Location: Lusaka, Zambia; 15°23′06″S 28°21′14″E
- Campus: Chainama Hill, Lusaka, Zambia
- Website: www.lmmu.ac.zm

Levy Mwanawasa Medical University (LMMU), is a public university in Lusaka, Zambia. It is the country’s first ever specialized University for health studies.

== Location ==
The main campus of the university is located on the Great East Road on Chainama Hill, in northeastern Lusaka, the capital and largest city of Zambia. The geographical coordinates of the university campus are: 15°23'06.0"S, 28°21'14.0"E (Latitude:-15.385000; Longitude:28.353889).

== Overview ==
The Levy Mwanawasa Medical University School of Medicine and Clinical Sciences, comprises the Chainama College of Health Sciences, the Dental Training School, Levy Mwanawasa University Teaching Hospital and Chainama Hills Hospital. Those public institutions, which were operating independent of each other, were integrated into one teaching institution, the School of Medicine of LMMU.

The schools and institutes that make up the university, include the following, as of August 2020: 1. Institute of Basic and Biomedical Sciences 2. School of Nursing 3. School of Health Sciences 4. School of Medicine and Clinical Sciences and 5. School of Public Health and Environmental Sciences.

== History ==
In 2016, the government of Zambia began the expansion of Levy Mwanawasa Teaching Hospital to 850 bed capacity. At the same time, construction started on a training annex, with student capacity of 3,000 adjacent to the hospital. The work was funded by the Zambian government to the tune of ZMW:170 million (approx. US$10 million). Sanjin Construction Engineering Group Company Limited were the main contractors. This formed the nucleus of Levy Mwanawasa Medical University.

== Academic programmes ==
As of August 2020, the following degree courses were offered at the university:

=== School of Medicine and Clinical Sciences ===
Undergraduate degree courses:

- Bachelor of Medicine and Bachelor of Surgery
- Bachelor of Science in Clinical Sciences
- Bachelor of Science in Clinical Anaesthesia
- Bachelor of Science in Clinical Ophthalmology
- Bachelor of Science in Optometry
- Bachelor of Science in Mental Health and Clinical Psychiatry

=== School of Nursing ===
Undergraduate degree courses:

- Bachelor of Science in Nursing
- Bachelor of Science in Ophthalmic Nursing
- Bachelor of Science in Midwifery
- Bachelor of Science in Public Health Nursing
- Bachelor of Science in Mental Health Nursing

=== Institute of Basic and Biomedical Sciences ===
Courses offered:

- Diploma in General Counselling
- Bachelor of Arts in Counselling
- Post Graduate Diploma in Medical Education
- Master of Science in Health Professions’ Education
- Doctor of Philosophy in Health Professions’ Education

=== School Of Health Sciences ===
Degree courses offered:

- Bachelor of Science in Nutrition and Dietetics
- Bachelor of Science in Biomedical Sciences
- Bachelor of pharmacy (Bpharm)
- Bachelor of science in radiography
- Bachelor of science in physiotherapy

=== School of Public Health and Environmental Sciences ===
The following courses are offered:

- Master of Public Health
- Bachelor of Science in Public Health
- Bachelor of Science in Environmental Health
- Bachelor of Science in Public Health Nutrition
- Diploma in Public Health
- Diploma in Environmental Health Sciences

== Other academic courses ==
In addition to the courses listed above, the university offers other diploma and certificate courses in its schools and institutes.

== See also ==
- List of universities in Zambia
- Education in Zambia
