= Lombe Chibesakunda =

Zambian politician

President of COMESA Court of Justice
- Incumbent
- Assumed office 2015
- Preceded by: Nzamba Kitonga

Acting Chief Justice of Zambia
- In office 2012–2015

Personal details
- Born: 5 May 1944 (age 82) Zambia
- Education: National Institute of Public Administration; Gray's Inn

Lombe Phyllis Chibesakunda (born 5 May 1944) is a Zambian lawyer and diplomat. She has been the chairperson of the Human Rights Commission of Zambia, Solicitor General, Deputy Minister in the Ministry of Legal Affairs, acting Chief Justice of Zambia, and has served as an Ambassador to Japan, the United Kingdom, the Vatican, and the Netherlands. Chibesakunda is the first woman president of the Common Market for Eastern and Southern Africa (COMESA) Court of Justice in Khartoum, Sudan.

== Early life ==
Lombe Phyllis Chibesakunda was born in Zambia on 5 May 1944. She comes from Chibesakunda royal family. Chibesakunda is a chief in the Muchinga Province of the Bisa ethnic group, one of the many dialects of northern Zambia. She attended Chibesakunda and Pandala Primary School in Northern Zambia. She later went to Chipembi Girls where she served as Head Girl, then later studied at the National Institute of Public Administration in Lusaka and also Gray's Inn in England.

== Career ==
Chibesakunda is a woman of ‘firsts’. She became the first female Zambian lawyer and State Advocate in the Ministry of Legal Affairs. She was a parliamentary candidate for the Matero constituency and Solicitor-General of the Republic of Zambia in 1973.

After a successful career in Law, Social Action, and Politics, she joined the diplomatic corps serving as ambassador to Japan (1975), Zambian High Commissioner to the United Kingdom (UK), Netherlands, and Holy See (1978–81). Chibesakunda took part in the Lancaster House talks that led to the independence of Zimbabwe, and actively campaigned against South African apartheid.

Chibesakunda was appointed Judge of the Industrial Relations Court in 1986 and later became Africa Development Bank Court President. Chibesakunda was appointed Chairperson of the Human Rights Commission of Zambia in 1997. Since 1981 she has concentrated on the judicial service as a judge at High Court, and Supreme Court and served as acting Chief Justice of Zambia from 2012 to 2015.

In 2015, Chibesakunda was elected president of the Common Market for Eastern and Southern Africa (COMESA) Court of Justice, based in Khartoum, Sudan, and is the first woman to hold this position. She succeeded Nzamba Kitonga of Kenya in the role. The last president Her Ladyship swore-in in her tenure as Acting Chief Justice of Zambia was president Edgar Lungu in August 2015.

Aside from judicial service, Justice Lombe Chibesakunda was a visiting professor at the Kansai University in Japan. Chibesakunda is a Chancellor at Rockview University in Lusaka, Zambia.

== Personal life ==
She has a son, Chita Chibesakunda.

== See also ==
- First women lawyers around the world
