= List of colleges in Zambia =

This is a list of colleges in Zambia as listed by the Zambian Higher Education Authority. This is a build up from the List of universities in Zambia as colleges are tertiary education institutions that are not classified as universities.

== Public colleges ==
These colleges are operated by the Government of Zambia, primarily under the Ministry of Higher Education.

Name	Location	Type	Notes
Charles Lwanga College of Education	Monze	Teacher Training	Teacher training college
Evelyn Hone College	Lusaka	Technical and Vocational	Established in 1963.
Northern Technical College (NORTEC)	Ndola	Technical	Technical and vocational training institution
Zambia Forestry College	Kitwe	Forestry	Trains in forestry and related fields

== See also ==
- Education in Zambia
- List of universities in Zambia
