= Rockview University =

Private university in Lusaka, Zambia

Coordinates: 15.379°S 28.279°E

- Motto: Proficiency and Excellency
- Type: Private University
- Vice-Chancellor: Chishala Lupambo
- Students: 10,000
- Location: Lusaka, Zambia
- Campus: Lusaka and Chipata Campuses
- Website: rockviewuniversity.com

Rockview University is privately owned and operated university located in Lusaka, Zambia. It is one of the fastest growing universities in Zambia and keeps seeing an exponential increase in the number of admissions each and every year. Every year, Rockview embarks on a country-wide interview program in which it awards bursaries to school leavers as well as those in service and would like to upgrade their studies. Lady Justice Lombe Chibesa is currently serving as the university chancellor.

Formerly a college of education, Rockview university had a limited number of programs it was admitting new students to. Ever since it got upgraded to a university, it has now had an increase in the number of degree programs such as Information & Communications Technology, Business Administration, Mathematics among others and a good number of Masters and PhD degrees. The School has both Full-Time Day scholar and Distance Learning modes. Full-Time students are admitted to the January and June Intake every year while the Distance Learning Modes are admitted to the April, September and December Intakes. The Institution recently commissioned a satellite Campus in Kitwe, Copperbelt Province.

Rockview university has a currently running television program feature on the Zambia National Broadcasting Corporation(ZNBC), Kwacha Good Morning which airs every Saturday morning. The program focuses on the operations of the university and its various activities

== Notable people ==
- Diana Chikotesha, FIFA football assistant referee. Faculty member

== See also ==
- List of universities in Zambia
- Education in Zambia
