= Northrise University =

University in Ndola, Zambia

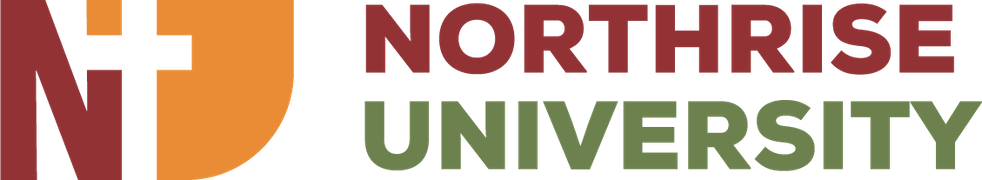
- Motto: Being excellent at what is good!
- Type: Private - Christ-centered
- Established: 2003; 23 years ago
- President: Dr. Moffat Zimba
- Faculty: 70
- Students: 1200
- Location: Plot 30029, Ndola-Kitwe Dual Carriageway, Ndola, Copperbelt Province, Zambia
- Campus: 640 acres (260 ha)
- Colors: Brick, Marigold, white & Fern
- Mascot: Eagle
- Website: northrise.edu.zm

Northrise University is a private, Christ-centered university in Ndola, Zambia. It was founded in 2003 by Dr. Moffat Zimba and Mrs. Doreen Zimba.

NU has local and international students who receive training in academic disciplines at undergraduate and postgraduate levels. While Northrise offers a nationally accredited education that is founded upon Christian principles, the university accepts students of all faiths. Northrise University as at 20 January 2023 has over 1200 students and 70 academic faculty members. The university has produced over 600 graduates working in different sectors of Zambia's economy.

The university is in partnership with Dordt University in Sioux Center, Iowa; Grand Canyon University in Arizona, LeTourneau University in Texas, Consortium For Global Education, Council for Christian Colleges & Universities and Fontys University of Applied Sciences in the Netherlands and Baylor University in Waco, Texas.

The university's accrediting partners are the Higher Education Authority (HEA), Zambia Qualifications Authority (ZAQA), Zambia Institute of Chartered Accountants (ZICA), Association of Chartered Certified Accountants (ACCA), and General Nursing Council of Zambia.

== Academic programs ==
Northrise University offers two-year diplomas and both bachelor's and master's degrees from the School of Business, while offering bachelor's degrees in the schools of Law, ICT, Nursing and Theology.

=== School of Business ===
Undergraduate Programs

- Bachelor of Business Administration (BBA)
- Bachelor of Finance & Accounting (BFA)
- Diploma In Human Resource Management (DipHRM)

Postgraduate Programs

- Executive Master of Business Administration (EMBA)

=== Center for Information and Communication Technologies (ICT) ===
The Center for ICT offers students with computer technology skills:

- Bachelor of Science in Computer Science (BSc CS)
- Bachelor of Information Technology in Web and Software Development (BIT WSD)

=== Faculty of Law ===
- Bachelor of Laws

=== School of Nursing ===
- Bachelor of Science in Nursing (BScN)

=== School of Theology ===
- Bachelor of Theology

=== School of Engineering (Coming Soon) ===
- Engineering Major (expected to launch in 2025)

=== Other ===
- Postgraduate Diploma in Teaching Methodology (PGDTM)

== History ==
Northrise University was founded in 2003. It was conceived in 1988 through the experiences of its founders Doreen and Moffat Zimba. Born in Zambia, Doreen and Moffat suffered from the lack of education opportunities for high school graduates that still characterize their country. Moffat and Doreen left Zambia to attend a Bible college in Australia. Upon completion, they went to Southern California where Moffat received his Doctorate from Fuller Theological Seminary and Doreen received her MBA in Technology Management from the University of Phoenix.

== Campus ==
=== Main Campus ===
The Main Campus is 8 kilometers west of the Ndola city centre on the T3 road (Ndola-Kitwe Dual Carriageway). The address is Plot 30029 Ndola-Kitwe Dual Carriageway.

Northrise, having been provided with 640 acres (2.6 km^{2}) of land, has embarked on a $10 million campus project. With demand for world-class, Christ-centered higher education continuing to increase, the Northrise Advancing the Vision Capital Plan has emerged to include the construction of the Campus Center administration building, two student dormitories, two classroom buildings with computer labs, a faculty duplex, and the Alumni Guest House. Further plans include the construction of three new dormitories, three more faculty duplexes, a security, and maintenance building, a dedicated student center (hub), and a convocation hall. Altogether, these plans are intended to accommodate ten years of future expansion.

== Finances ==
=== Northrise University Initiative ===
Northrise University Initiative is a 501(c)3 California non-profit corporation established to support Northrise University in Zambia.

==== Student Sponsorship ====
Northrise University offers opportunities for donors to sponsor students, as most Zambians cannot afford full tuition on their own. Those who receive financial aid are required to contribute to their tuition, which gives students a greater sense of ownership and accomplishment.

=== Northrise Farms ===
Northrise Farms is a wholly owned agricultural unit of Northrise University. The farm provides farm produce for the NU community and the general public. Ultimately, the farm will contribute towards reducing the operating costs of the university, thereby providing an opportunity for students from poor families to attend Northrise University at affordable fees. The farm also provides employment to the community. The establishment of Northrise Farms serves as a foundation for the commencement of the Faculty of Agriculture at Northrise University. The farm provides food for students and staff.

The farm’s soil and high water table, as well as the region’s climate, are intended to support a future Agricultural program. Through its partnership with California Polytechnic State University, San Luis Obispo, Northrise will provide training to equip students for farming employment. The farm will serve as a working model and consulting center for Zambians looking to establish their own farms.

=== Northrise Services ===
Northrise Services is a company owned by Northrise University. Because of the poor state of the economy, most Zambians cannot afford to pay tuition to attend classes. Since tuition alone cannot fund University operations, Northrise has had to find additional sources of funding other than donations. Therefore, NS was created to help ensure that the university has the financial support it needs to continue.

== See also ==
- List of universities in Zambia
- Education in Zambia
