= Affordable Medicines Facility-malaria =

The Affordable Medicines Facility-malaria (AMFm)
- Founded: April 2009 (launched) and July 2010 (began operations)
- Purpose: Innovative financing mechanism to expand access to the most effective treatment for malaria, artemisinin-based combination therapies (ACTs)
- Location: Geneva, Switzerland
- Region served: Phase 1: Cambodia, Ghana, Kenya, Madagascar, Niger, Nigeria, Tanzania (mainland and Zanzibar), Uganda
- Website: www.theglobalfund.org/en/privatesectorcopayment/

The Affordable Medicines Facility-malaria (AMFm) is a financing mechanism intended to expand access to affordable and effective antimalarial medication (artemisinin-based combination therapies, ACTs). It works primarily through the commercial private sector, in addition to the public and non-governmental organization sectors which are the more traditional routes for development assistance in malaria control. Its goal is to drive down the price of the most effective malaria medicines so that millions of people can afford to buy them. The program has been called "one of the most important recent advances in fighting malaria" and "a triumph of international cooperation." The AMFm is hosted and managed by the Global Fund to Fight AIDS, Tuberculosis and Malaria in Geneva, Switzerland.

The premise of the AMFm is that a factory-gate global subsidy, with measures to support its implementation, will save lives and reduce malaria-related mortality by increasing access to ACTs, and delay the onset of widespread resistance to the artemisinin in ACTs. It includes three elements: (i) price reductions through negotiations with ACT manufacturers, (ii) a buyer subsidy through a 'co-payment' at the top of the global supply chain and (iii) supporting interventions at the country level to promote the appropriate use of ACTs.

AMFm Phase 1 was formally launched in April 2009 and began operations in July 2010. AMFm Phase 1 is being implemented through nine pilot programs in eight countries: Cambodia, Ghana, Kenya, Madagascar, Niger, Nigeria, Tanzania (mainland and Zanzibar) and Uganda. There are early signs AMFm Phase 1 is effectively increasing availability and decreasing prices of ACTs; however the Global Fund Board will only take a decision on the future of AMFm at the end of 2012 on the basis of an independent evaluation. As part of the Copenhagen Consensus 2012, a panel of leading economists concluded that the AMFm was "one of the best returns on health that could be made globally" and ranked it two of 16 priority solutions to advance global welfare.

In November 2012 the Global Fund Board decided to modify the existing AMFm business line by integrating lessons learned from Phase 1 into Global Fund core grant management and financial processes. The AMFm was subsequently renamed the Private Sector Co-payment Mechanism.

== Background ==
Malaria is a life-threatening disease caused by parasites that are transmitted to humans through the bites of infected mosquitoes. Plasmodium falciparum is the species of the malaria parasite that causes the vast majority of severe disease and death. In 2010, there were about 216 million cases of malaria globally, and about 655,000 deaths – mostly among children in Africa. Yet, malaria is preventable and treatable.

The most effective treatment for malaria are ACTs which combine artemisinin with another antimalarial medication. ACTs are recommended by the World Health Organization (WHO) as first-line treatment for uncomplicated P. falciparum malaria and, in 2004, the Global Fund to Fight AIDS, Tuberculosis and Malaria, the largest global funding source for malaria control, began reprogramming all approved grants to procure ACTs in areas with high levels of drug resistance. However, ACTs account for only one in five antimalarial treatments taken and, until the advent of the Affordable Medicines Facility-malaria (AMFm), were provided almost entirely by the public sector. Over 60 percent of patients in malaria endemic areas access anti-malarial treatment through the private sector but, before the AMFm, the private sector only accounted for about 5 percent of all ACTs provided. ACTs are more expensive than the less-effective first-line malaria treatments, such as chloroquine (CQ), sulfadoxine/pyrimethamine (SP) and amodiaquine (AQ), which usually cost less than US$1. Therefore, unsubsidized, quality-assured ACTs are not affordable by many of the people who need them in malaria-endemic countries. This leads to avoidable complications or death, since people either do not receive treatment or use cheaper, less effective antimalarials. Further, if patients use artemisinin monotherapies, this increases the risk of widespread resistance to artemisinin.

The challenges noted above have been compounded by a mismatch between country realities and the channels through which ACTs financed by development aid were routed. Whereas the commercial private sector plays a significant, sometimes dominant, role in many countries, donor-funded ACTs have been traditionally channeled mostly through the public sector and not-for-profit private sector. These factors, combined with an insufficiency of ACTs relative to the burden of malaria, resulted in poor access to ACTs at country level and persistent use of inappropriate alternatives.

== Origins ==
In 2004, the United States Institute of Medicine called for a global co-payment toward purchases of ACTs by first-line buyers directly from drug manufacturers. This call stemmed from the recommendations of the IOM committee chaired by Nobel Laureate economist Professor Kenneth Arrow, which were published in Saving Lives, Buying Time: Economics of Malaria Drugs in an Age of Resistance. The IOM committee advocated for "a sustained global subsidy of artemisinin co-formulated with other antimalarial drugs in order to reduce malaria mortality ("saving lives") and delay resistance ("buying time")" until new categories of antimalarials could be developed. The proposed buyer co-payment for quality-assured ACTs would be available to both the public and private sectors. Arrow explained, "When I discovered that 70% of chloroquine was distributed commercially, I immediately came to the conclusion that ACTs would have to be distributed through the private sector if we wanted nearly universal coverage." Subsequent analyses published in peer-reviewed journals reconfirmed the potential impact of the IOM committee proposal.

Better access to ACTs is an essential part of the comprehensive package of interventions required to fight malaria that includes prevention (insecticide-treated nets, indoor residual spraying, other vector control techniques and in development of malaria vaccines) and treatments for severe malaria.

== Establishment ==
The Roll Back Malaria (RBM) Partnership, in collaboration with the World Bank and the Bill & Melinda Gates Foundation, initiated work in 2006 to implement the IOM proposal; the key technical design principles of the AMFm were developed and endorsed in 2007. The Global Fund to Fight AIDS, Tuberculosis and Malaria was invited to host the AMFm and, in 2008, the Global Fund Board approved the implementation plan and policy framework for a limited Phase 1 of the AMFm: the launch of the AMFm would be phased, beginning with a limited number of countries (approximately 290 million ACT treatments to be supplied over two years); Phase 1 of the AMFm will be assessed via an independent technical evaluation; the findings of this evaluation would be reviewed by the Global Fund Board in 2010 to decide whether to proceed to global roll out of the AMFm. Following this approval, preparations began for the launch of the AMFm in 2009.

== Elements ==
AMFm Phase 1 has three elements: (i) price reductions through negotiations with ACT manufacturers, (ii) a buyer subsidy through a 'co-payment' at the manufacturer level of the global supply chain and (iii) supporting interventions to promote appropriate use of ACTs.

== Implementation ==
AMFm Phase 1 was formally launched in April 2009 and began operations in July 2010. Eleven countries were invited to participate in the pilot and eight countries (nine pilots) were ultimately approved by January 2010: Cambodia, Ghana, Kenya, Madagascar, Niger, Nigeria, Tanzania (mainland and Zanzibar) and Uganda. Given the delays associated with the startup of AMFm Phase 1, the Global Fund Board extended the implementation period of AMFm Phase 1 by six months to end 2012.
