= Kwame Nkrumah University =

Public university in Zambia

Kwame Nkrumah University (KNU)
- Motto: Teaching for Excellence
- Type: Public
- Established: 1967; 59 years ago
- Vice-Chancellor: Prof. Alfred M. Mwanza, PhD
- Academic staff: 74+ (2016)
- Students: 6,000+ (2016)
- Location: Kabwe, Zambia; 14°26′41″S 28°28′02″E
- Campus: Urban
- Website: www.nkrumah.edu.zm

Kwame Nkrumah University (KNU) is a public university in Zambia.

== Location ==
The university's main campus is in the central business district of the city of Kabwe, approximately 155 kilometres (96 mi) by road north of Lusaka, the capital and largest city in Zambia. The geographical coordinates of Kwame Nkrumah University are:14°26'41.0"S, 28°28'02.0"E (Latitude:-14.444722; Longitude:28.467222).

== History ==
The institution was opened in 1967 as Kabwe Teachers Training College. It trained junior secondary school teachers at its inception. Four years later, the president of Zambia at the time, Kenneth Kaunda, renamed the college Nkrumah Teachers College, in honor of Kwame Nkrumah, the first Prime Minister and first President of Ghana. During the period when Levy Mwanawasa was president (2002 to 2008), the college began transforming into a university, a process that concluded while Michael Sata was in office (2011 to 2014).

Kwame Nkrumah University was established by Part IV, Section 14 of the Higher Education Act No. 4 of 2013. At its inception, the university could only accommodate 600 students, a number that has since increased to 6,000. As of August 2016, it employed 74 full-time academic staff. At that time, the university was undergoing a major infrastructure expansion, including four student hostels; each capable of accommodating 600 students. Hua Jiang Investment Limited, a Chinese construction firm, is carrying out the construction works, on which the government of Zambia had spent in excess of ZMW:57,518,410 (approx. US$5.68 million).

The university held its first graduation ceremony under its own university letterheads in August 2015.

== Campus locations ==
Nkrumah University has four campus locations. The main campus — Munkoyo Street Campus — is about 3 km from the Kabwe city centre. The other campus is the West Campus which lies immediately to the left of Main Campus. Kwame Nkrumah University has a new state of the art Library which is located at the west campus. The third campus is the East Campus which has the East Old Library, the East Hall, the graduation square and PAIDESA. Nkrumah University has recently acquired the PAID-ESA which is in East Campus along the same street (Previously the Pan African Institute for Development - East/Southern Africa); this campus will help expand the capacity of the university. The fourth campus is the newly opened South-East campus which is about 1km away from the East Campus.

== Academics ==
The following programmes are offered by Kwame Nkrumah University:

- Bachelor of Arts with Education in the Hu
- on in the Natural Sciences
- Bachelor of Business Studies with Education
- Bachelor of Science in Marketing
- Bachelor of Business Banking and Finance
- Bachelor of Digital Marketing
- Bachelor of Arts in Economics
- Bachelor of Arts in Economics and Finance
- Bachelor of Arts in Economics and Statistics
- Bachelor of arts in Accountancy
- Bachelor of Arts in Human Resource
- Bachelor of Arts in Procurement and Supply Chain management

=== Departments ===
The Nkrumah University is divided into 4 schools:

- School of Natural Sciences with departments for:
1. Life Sciences
2. Physical Sciences
3. Mathematics and Statistics
4. Physical Education
- School of Business Studies with departments for:
1. Computing and Communication Technologies
2. Accounting, Economics and Finance
3. Marketing and Management Studies
- School of Education with departments for:
1. Psychology And Sociology
2. Educational Administration and Policy Studies
3. Languages and Social Sciences Education
4. Mathematics and Science Education
5. Special Education
- School of Humanities & Social Sciences with departments for:
1. Civic Education
2. Literature and Languages
3. Religious Studies
4. History
5. Geography

== Governance ==
The University Senate runs the university under the supervision of the University Council. There are four schools namely; the school of Natural Science, the school of Business Studies, the school of Humanities and Social Sciences, and the school of Education. There are two institutes; Institute of Open and Distance Learning, and the Centre for Information and Communication Technology.

Care Taker Committee of Kwame Nkrumah University composed of Dr. Yusuf Ahmed (chairperson), Mrs. Sherry Anne Thole (Vice Chairperson), Dr. Christopher Mazimba, Dr. Elizabeth Nkumbula, Mr. Felix A. Nkandu, Dr. Phoebe Albina Bwembya, Hon. Susan B. Kawandami, Permanent Secretary Ministry of Higher Education, Permanent Secretary Ministry of Finance (Budget). Prof Hellicy Ng'ambi Vice Chancellor and Dr. Judith C.N.Lungu (Deputy Vice Chancellor) of Kwame Nkrumah University

== Other facilities ==
- The University Guest House and Lodge.

== Student life ==
=== Activities ===
- Sports
- Community service

=== Press and radio ===
Nkruman Times Nkrumah University media

=== Students residences ===
- Mulungushi hostel (gents)
- New Hostels (males/females)
- Luapula hostel (gents)
- Kafue hostel (gents)
- PAID-ESA hostels (gents)
- Liseli hostel (females)
- Chimwemwe hostel (females)
- Zambezi hostel (females)
- Luangwa hostel (females)

=== Sports clubs ===
Netball, Football, Volleyball, Basketball, Rugby, Badminton, Tennis.

== Affiliations ==
Nkrumah is a new member of the Association of African Universities, the Association of Commonwealth Universities, Football Association of Zambia and the International Association of Universities.

== See also ==
- Education in Zambia
- List of universities in Zambia
