= Gideon Robert University =

University in Lusaka, Zambia

- Motto: Breaking New Frontiers of Higher Education
- Type: Private
- Established: 2010; 16 years ago
- Accreditation: Higher Education Authority (Zambia)
- Vice-Chancellor: Prof. Ronald Siame Kaulule
- Location: Lusaka, Zambia

Gideon Robert University is a private university located in Lusaka, Zambia. It was established in 2010. Founded in 2010, it is officially recognised by the Ministry of Higher Education, Science, Research and Innovation and regulated by the Higher Education Authority of Zambia (HEA).

GRU offers undergraduate, postgraduate, and doctoral programmes across various academic fields and operates campuses in Lusaka, Lilayi, Kalulushi, and Mapanza. Independent global university directories such as uniRank and EduRank list the institution as an accredited private university in Zambia, ranking it 15th nationally according to EduRank. The university is classified at Zambia Qualifications Framework (ZQF) Level 10, enabling it to offer degrees up to doctoral level.

== History ==
Gideon Robert University was established in 2010 during the expansion of Zambia's private higher education sector, in line with national policies to improve access to tertiary education. Initially offering diploma programmes in education and business, it expanded in the mid-2010s to include bachelor's degrees, with additional campuses registered in Lilayi and Kalulushi. In 2024, the HEA classified GRU among 14 Zambian universities eligible to award doctoral degrees under the ZQF.This represented a significant milestone in its academic development. In 2025, the university encountered regulatory scrutiny and legal challenges concerning its health sciences programmes, particularly allegations of an unaccredited medical degree.

== Timeline ==
2010 – Established as a private institution in Lusaka.

2012–2015 – Expanded to bachelor's programmes; campuses in Lilayi and Kalulushi registered with HEA.

2019–2020 – Introduction of Bachelor of Medicine and Surgery programme

2020 – Growth in postgraduate enrolment noted in university directories.

2024 – Classified by HEA to offer doctoral degrees.

== Campuses ==
According to HEA records, GRU operates four campuses:

Lusaka – Main administrative campus located in the NPF Building, 5th Floor, Cairo Road.

Lilayi – Focuses on academic and teaching facilities, including health sciences.

Kalulushi – Satellite campus in Copperbelt Province.

Mapanza – Additional campus in Southern Province.

== Accreditation and recognition ==
GRU is accredited by the Ministry of Higher Education through the HEA and is listed in the official register of private higher education institutions authorised to confer degrees in Zambia. It holds programmatic accreditations and affiliations with bodies such as the Health Professions Council of Zambia (HPCZ), Nursing and Midwifery Council of Zambia (NMCZ), Association of Private Universities in Zambia (APUZ/PRICUA), and Zambia Qualifications Authority (ZAQA). In 2024, the HEA designated GRU as eligible to offer doctoral-level qualifications. Global directories like uniRank and EduRank confirm its accreditation within Zambia's system, with an estimated acceptance rate of around 64%.

=== Academic structure ===
GRU is organised into several schools offering programmes from diplomas to doctorates in fields including education, business, humanities, health sciences, engineering, and more. The academic calendar is semester-based.

== School of Teacher Education ==
Bachelor of Education (various specialisations, e.g., Natural Sciences, Languages, Social Sciences, Primary, Special Education)

Diploma in Primary Education

Diploma in Secondary Education

== School of Commerce and Developmental Studies ==
Bachelor of Business Administration

Bachelor of Commerce Bachelor of Accounting

Master of Business Administration

Master of Public Administration

== School of Humanities and Law ==
Bachelor of Arts in Economics

Bachelor of Arts in Sociology

Bachelor of Arts in Psychology

Bachelor of Arts in Public Administration

Master of Arts in International Relations and Development Master of Arts in Conflict Resolution

== School of Medicine and Health Sciences ==
Bachelor of Science in Public Health

Diploma in Nursing

Bachelor of Science in Health Services Management

Bachelor of Medicine and Surgery (MBChB)

Diploma in Clinical Medicine

== School of Engineering and Bio-Sciences ==
Bachelor of Science in Computer Science

Bachelor of Science in Information Technology

Bachelor of Science in Agriculture Bachelor of Environmental Management

Bachelor of Engineering (various)

=== Postgraduate and Doctoral Studies ===
Following the 2024 HEA classification, GRU offers doctoral programmes including:

Doctor of Philosophy (PhD) in Public Health

Doctor of Philosophy (PhD) in Business Administration

Doctor of Philosophy (PhD) in Computer Science

Doctor of Philosophy (PhD) in Management

Doctor of Philosophy (PhD) in Mathematics

Doctor of Philosophy (PhD) in Theology

The university also awards honorary doctorates, such as those conferred to Zambia's Vice President W.K. Mutale Nalumango in 2024 for contributions to education and political science.

=== Partnerships ===
GRU collaborates with national and professional bodies for accreditation, training, and quality assurance:

Higher Education Authority (HEA) – Regulatory oversight.

Health Professions Council of Zambia (HPCZ) and health stakeholders – Programme approvals and ongoing discussions.

Zambia National Broadcasting Corporation (ZNBC) – Coverage of events such as graduations.

Private Colleges and Universities Alliance (PRICUA) – Advocacy during regulatory matters.

== See also ==
- List of universities in Zambia
- Education in Zambia
