= Copperstone University =

University in Copperbelt Province, Zambia

- Motto: Our Vision, Our Country, Our world
- Established: 2004; 22 years ago
- Vice-Chancellor: Prof Sitwala Mundia
- Students: full time /Open Distance Learning
- Location: Luanshya, Zambia
- Campus: Plot 38002, Baluba Campus, along Ndola-Kitwe Dual Carriageway, Luanshya
- Website: Official Website

Copperstone University is located in Luanshya District, Copperbelt Province, Zambia (25 km north of Luanshya). It is on the Ndola-Kitwe Dual Carriageway (T3 Road). It was founded in 2004.

== History ==
The university was established in 2004, through company incorporation. In July 2011, it attained its charter.

== Location ==
With the main campus located in the northern part of Luanshya District, on the Ndola-Kitwe Dual Carriageway.The physical library is located at Baluba River Campus with a collection of over 4000 books and serials across various fields.

== See also ==
- List of universities in Zambia
- Education in Zambia
