= Victoria Falls University of Technology =

Private university in Zambia

- Type: Private
- Established: 2010; 16 years ago
- Vice-Chancellor: Gertrude Mwangala
- Location: Nakatindi Road (M10), Livingstone, Zambia
- Website: Official website

Victoria Falls University of Technology is a private university located on the M10 road in Livingstone, Zambia.

== See also ==
- List of universities in Zambia
