= University of Bertoua =

University in Cameroon

- Motto: Science - Faith - Integrity
- Type: Public university
- Established: 2022; 4 years ago
- Affiliation: Agence Universitaire de la Francophonie
- Rector: Prof. Dieudonné Emmanuel Pegnyemb
- Students: 4000 (2022–2023)
- Location: Bertoua, East, Cameroon
- Language: French and English
- Website: Official website

The University of Bertoua (French: Université de Bertoua) is one of the eleven public universities in Cameroon. It is located in the city of Bertoua, the capital of the East Region in Cameroon.

== History ==
Created by presidential decree no. 2022/0008 of January 6, 2022, the university of Bertoua is a public university institution in Cameroon. It inherited higher education schools that already existed in the city and annexes attached to other universities. In 2022, Rémy Magloire Etoua became the first Rector.

== Organization ==
The University of Bertoua is organized into four faculties and four higher education schools.

=== Faculties ===
- Faculty of Arts, Letters, and Human Sciences
- Faculty of Sciences
- Faculty of Economics and Management Sciences
- Faculty of Law and Political Science

=== Higher education schools ===
- Higher Teacher Training College of Bertoua (ENS)
- Higher Institute of Agriculture, Wood, Water, and Environment (ISABEE) in Bélabo
- Higher School of Urbanism and Tourism Sciences (ESSUT)
- Higher School of Mining and Energy Resources Transformation (ESTM)

== Rectors ==
- Prof. Dieudonné Emmanuel Pegnyemb (2024– )
- Prof. Rémy Magloire Etoua (2022–2024)
