= Texila American University Zambia =

Private university in Zambia

- Type: Private
- Established: 2016; 10 years ago
- Location: Lusaka, Zambia
- Campus: Urban
- Website: University website

Texila American University Zambia (TAU–Z) is a private university in Lusaka, Zambia, established in 2016 after gaining its charter from the Higher Education Authority (HEA) of Zambia. TAU–Z offers a comprehensive range of bachelor’s, master’s, and doctoral programs, particularly in medicine, public health, business administration, and information technology.

== Accreditation ==
Texila American University Zambia is registered with the Higher Education Authority (HEA), the statutory body overseeing higher education in Zambia. Health-related programmes, including the Bachelor of Medicine and Bachelor of Surgery (MBChB) and the Master of Public Health (MPH), are accredited by the Health Professions Council of Zambia (HPCZ).

== See also ==
- List of universities in Zambia
