= Lusaka Apex Medical University =

Lusaka Apex Medical University (LAMU)
- Type: Private
- Established: 2008; 18 years ago
- Vice Chancellor: Prof. Lupando Munkonge
- Location: Kasama Road, Lusaka, Zambia; 15°28′37″S 28°19′50″E
- Campus: Seba Village
- Website: Homepage

Lusaka Apex Medical University is a private university in Zambia.

== Location ==
The main campus of the university is located along Kasama Road, approximately 13.1 kilometres (8 mi), by road, south of the central business district of the city of Lusaka, Zambia's capital and largest city. The geographical coordinates of the main university campus are:15°28'37.0"S, 28°19'50.0"E (Latitude:-15.476944; Longitude:28.330556).

The University maintains other campuses, including (a) the Foxdale Campus, along Zambezi Road (b) the Mutandwa Campus, along Mutandwa Road and (c) the TICK Campus, along Kasama Road, all in Lusaka Province.

== Overview ==
Lusaka Apex Medical University is a leading private Medical University In Zambia. The University will contribute to the global supply of highly qualified health professionals with emphasis on Zambia and Southern Africa. Apex Medical University is a Centre of Excellence in Medical, Nursing and Health Sciences Education, Research and Specialised Clinical Care. The university was established by 8 Zambian professionals, and was incorporated in 2008, with the objective of complementing the government of Zambia in training competent, skilled medical and healthcare personnel to serve the people of Zambia and Southern Africa.

== Academics ==
As of December 2017, the university offers the following courses:

Undergraduate courses

- Bachelor of Medicine and Bachelor of Surgery
- Bachelor of Dental Surgery
- Bachelor of Science in Nursing
- Bachelor of Science in Midwifery
- Bachelor of Science in Biomedical Sciences
- Bachelor of Science in Anaesthesia
- Bachelor of Science in Physiotherapy
- Bachelor of Science in Radiography
- Bachelor of Science in Environmental Health
- Bachelor of Science in Pharmacy

Postgraduate courses

The following postgraduate courses are available:

- Master of Medicine in Clinical Oncology
- Master of Medicine in Diagnostic Radiology

Diploma programmes

- Diploma in Nursing
- Diploma in Physiotherapy

Pre-Medical Foundation Programme

A programme that covers Biology, Chemistry, Mathematics and Physics at A-Level education standards.

== See also ==
- List of universities in Zambia
- Education in Zambia
