= Eden University =

Education institute in Zambia

Coordinates: 15.3635°S 28.2335°E

- Motto: Your Dream University
- Type: Private
- Established: 2010; 16 years ago
- Students: Over 10000
- Location: Lusaka, Zambia
- Website: Official website

Eden University, formerly known as Eden Institute, is a private institution of higher education located in Lusaka Zambia.

It is affiliated with the Seventh-day Adventist Church and has made notable humanitarian contributions to the less privileged in Zambia.

Established in 2010 as a teachers' training institute, Eden University has, over the years, evolved into a large university that boasts of being the first Zambian institution to offer a bachelor's degree in Fire Engineering.

In 2018, the university organized an event that was supposed to feature P. L. O. Lumumba and talk about Chinese influence on Africa, but due to the controversial nature of the topic, the PF government, which was widely seen as pro-China, denied him entry into the country. However, in 2021 when the UPND government took over after defeating the PF regime in elections that same year, PLO Lumumba was allowed into the country and the event was finally held on 26 September 2021.

== See also ==
- List of universities in Zambia
- Education in Zambia
