= Cavendish College London =

Defunct private college in London, England

- Founder: Siamak Taslimi
- Established: 1985
- Dissolved: December 2011

The Cavendish College London (CCL), also sometimes known as Cavendish College, was a private education institution. It provided courses in computing, creative studies, digital media, business, hospitality and music. Cavendish College London closed in December 2011.

== History ==
The college was established in 1985. In 2004, Cavendish expanded its operations in Africa and opened a university in Zambia (Cavendish University Zambia) after four years of successful operation in Zambia, the brand expanded to Uganda and opened its second university in 2008 (Cavendish University Uganda) and established other colleges internationally. Cavendish College Limited was dissolved following insolvency proceedings in 2012.

Cavendish International Education continues to operate other colleges internationally.
