= Copperbelt University =

Public university in Kitwe, Zambia

The Copperbelt University
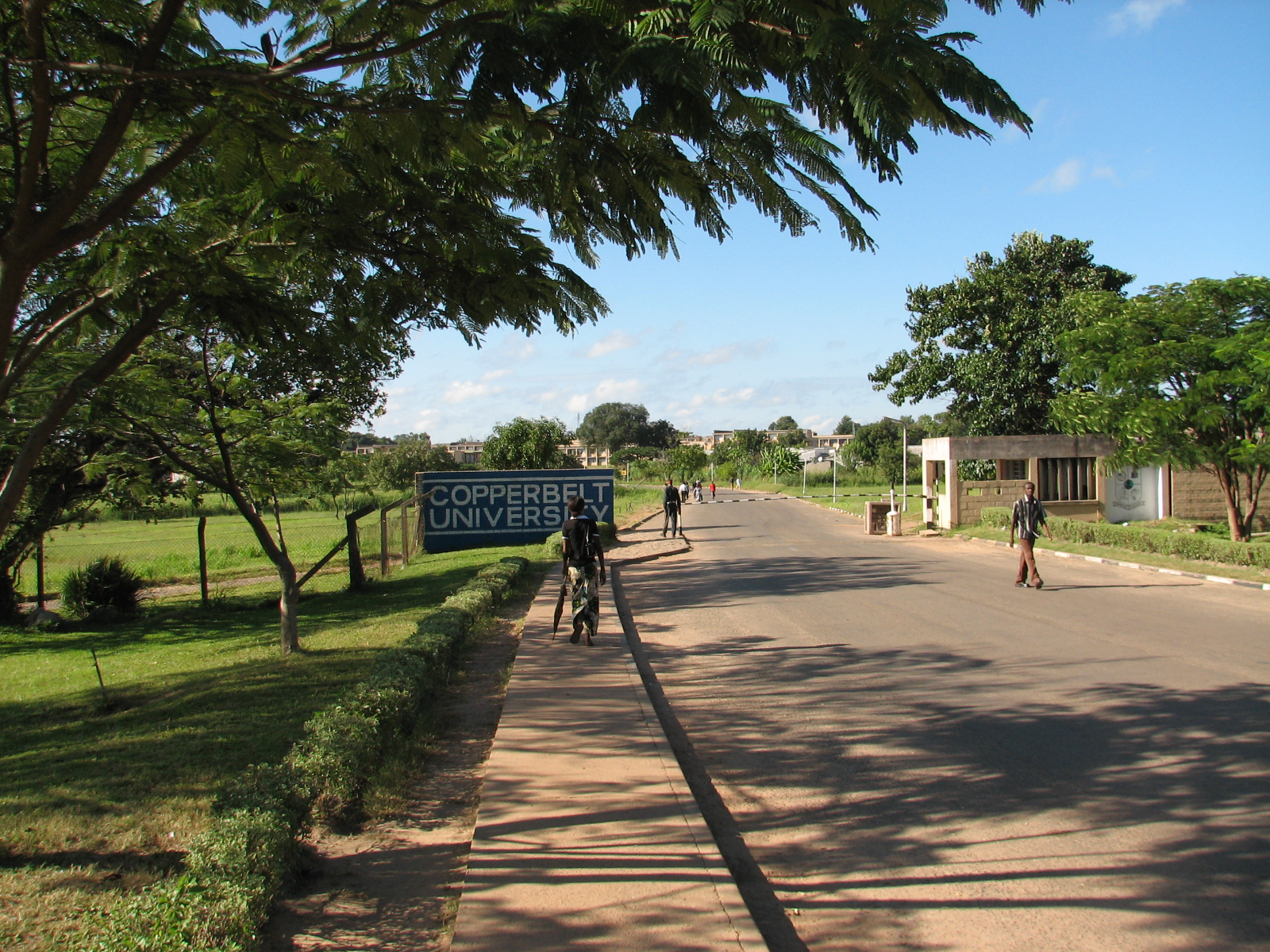
- Motto: Knowledge and Service
- Type: Public
- Established: 1987; 39 years ago
- Vice-Chancellor: Imasiku Nyambe
- Administrative staff: 1130
- Students: 15000
- Location: Kitwe, Zambia; 12°48′20″S 28°14′25″E
- Campus: Riverside; Parklands; Lusaka; Ndola; Kapasa Makasa; Tazara
- Website: www.cbu.edu.zm

The Copperbelt University is a public university in Kitwe, Zambia. It is the largest public university in Zambia. The language of instruction at the university is English.

== Overview ==
The Copperbelt University is a public university established through Act of Parliament No. 19 of 1987. It currently operates from five campuses: Riverside Main Campus along Jambo Drive, Parklands Campus, Ndola Campus, Kapasa Makasa Campus and TAZARA Campus. The TAZARA campus is currently offering only Railway, Mechanical and Electromechanical Engineering. These campuses are located in suburban areas in the cities of Lusaka, Kitwe, Ndola and Chinsali in the Copperbelt and Muchinga Provinces of Zambia.

The Copperbelt University has the biggest school of engineering in the country, offering a variety of engineering fields as bachelor's degrees with honors. It is the first institution in Southern Africa to offer mechatronics, as an achievement.

The Copperbelt University has the biggest school of built environment, offering programs such as Architecture, Real Estate, Urban and Regional Planning and Quantity Surveying).

The university's core business is to provide teaching, learning, research, consultancy and public service. These are carried out through its ten faculties:

- School of Engineering
  - Bachelor's degree in Civil Engineering (Hons).
  - Bachelor of Science in Construction Management
  - Diploma in Civil Engineering
  - Diploma in Construction
  - Bachelor of Engineering (with honors) Electrical Electronics
  - Bachelor of Engineering (with honors) Telecommunications
  - Bachelor's degree in Mechanical,
  - Bachelor of Engineering Mechatronics
  - Bachelor of Engineering Aeronautical Engineering.
  - Bachelor of Engineering in Electromechanical Engineering
  - Bachelor of Engineering in Railway.
- School of Mathematics and Natural Sciences
- School of Natural Resources
- School of Business
- School of the Built Environment
  - Bachelor of Science in Real Estate
  - Bachelor of Science in Urban and Regional Planning
  - Bachelor of Science in Construction Economics Management
  - Bachelor of Arts in Architecture
- School of Information and Communication Technology
  - Bachelor of Science in Computer Science
  - Diploma in Information Technology
  - Bachelor of Information Technology
  - Bachelor of Computer Engineering
  - Bachelor of Science in Information Systems
- School of Humanities and Social Sciences
- Directorate of Distance Education and Open Learning (DDEOL)
- School of Medicine
- School of Mines and Mineral Sciences
- bachelor of engineering in chemical engineering
- Dag Hammarskjold Chair for Peace, Human Rights and Conflict Management

The Copperbelt University has about 15,900 students and produces an annual average of 1, 500 graduates who form a nucleus of experts in critical areas of national development. These include mining, banking, construction, environmental, agricultural, real estate, educational, medical, engineering and manufacturing sectors.

== History ==
The Copperbelt University is a public university established through the Act of Parliament No. 19 of 1987. Prior to 1987, the university existed as a campus of the University of Zambia Federal System with two schools; namely: School of Business and Industrial Studies (SBIS) and School of Environmental Studies (SES). The campus was referred to as the University of Zambia at Ndola (UNZANDO) until 1 December 1987. As of 1 January 1989 the Zambia Institute of Technology (ZIT) was incorporated into the Copperbelt University to form the School of Technology. Since 1987, the university has significantly grown from only two faculties to ten by the end of 2013. The total number of students in 2017 was 11,900 and having had over 54,000 students in the past 25 years. At its first graduation ceremony in 1992, the university had only 100 students then graduating from the various disciplines but graduating average of 1,500 as at 2017.

In 2014, the School of Medicine received US$1 million in donation from the Council of Zambian Jewry of the African Jewish Congress and the World Jewish Congress.

== Notable alumni ==
- Felix C Mutati, the former Zambian Minister of Finance
- Margaret Mhango Mwanakatwe, the former Zambian Minister of Finance
- Alan Kabanshi, Engineer and Researcher

== Affiliations ==
Association of Commonwealth Universities; Association of African Universities; African Council for Distance Education; Southern African Regional Universities; signatory to the SADC Protocol on Higher Education.

== See also ==
- Education in Zambia
- University of Zambia
- Mulungushi University
- List of universities in Zambia
