= Evangelical University =

Private university in Ndola, Zambia

- Former name: Theological College of Central Africa
- Motto: Entrusted to teach
- Type: Private
- Established: 1960; 66 years ago
- Parent institution: Evangelical Fellowship of Zambia (EFZ); Africa Evangelical Fellowship (AEF)
- Chairman: Samuel Yawila
- Chancellor: Hakainde Hichilema
- Vice-Chancellor: Margit Schwemmle
- Students: 7,500 (2021)
- Location: 60-64 Kwacha Road; Ndola; P.O. Box 250100, N/A, Ndola, Copperbelt Province, Zambia; 12°57′18″S 28°37′54″E
- Campus: urban
- Colours: Green
- Nickname: EU
- Website: www.evangelicaluniversity.ac.zm
- Evangelical University

Evangelical University (EU), formerly known as Theological College of Central Africa (TCCA), is a private Christian university administered by the Evangelical Fellowship of Zambia (EFZ) located in Ndola in the Copperbelt Province of Zambia. The university was developed with a help from Africa Evangelical Fellowship (AEF) and the Evangelical Church in Zambia (ECZ). It is one of the principal universities of Zambia. It was founded in 1960 after being transformed from a teachers training college.

== Academics ==
=== Faculties and departments ===
The university consists of the following faculties and departments:

==== Faculty of Education ====
- Educational Foundations
- Teaching, Learning and Curriculum Studies

==== Faculty of Environmental Science ====
- Fisheries and Aquatic Science
- Forestry and Environmental Management
- Geo-Science
- Water Resources Management

==== Faculty of Health Sciences ====
- Biomedical Sciences
- Nursing and Midwifery
- Optometry

==== Faculty of Humanities and Social Science ====
- Communication Studies
- Theology and Religious Studies
- History and Heritage Studies
- Information Science
- Governance, Peace, and Security Studies
