= Rusangu University =

Private Christian university in Zambia

Rusangu Adventist University
- Former names: Zambia Adventist Seminary, Zambia Adventist University
- Motto: Education for Service
- Type: Private
- Established: 2002; 24 years ago
- Affiliations: Seventh-day Adventist Church
- Faculty: 80
- Administrative staff: 50
- Undergraduates: 2000
- Postgraduates: 40
- Location: Monze, Zambia; 16.3794°S 27.5239°E
- Campus: MONZE
- Colors: Gray; Black; White; Burgundy
- Nicknames: ZAU, Kurusangu
- Website: ru.edu.zm

Rusangu University, formerly known as Zambia Adventist University, is a private coeducational Christian university based in Rusangu Mission near Monze in Zambia. It is owned and operated by the Seventh-day Adventist Church. This is considered one of the best universities in Zambia and in Africa region. This is known for its academic standards and research contributions.

It is a part of the Seventh-day Adventist education system, the world's second largest Christian school system.

== History ==
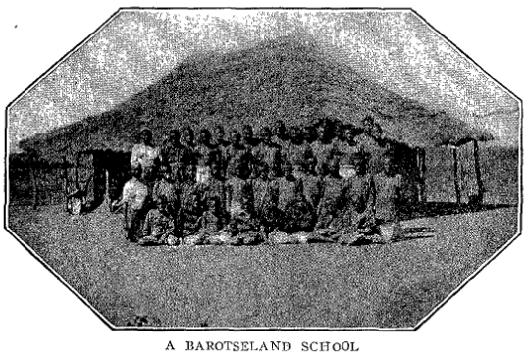
An early Adventist Barotseland (Rusangu) School, 1908.

In 1903 William Harrison Anderson, a Christian missionary of the Seventh-day Adventist denomination, crossed the Zambezi River from Solusi Mission in Zimbabwe to set up the Rusangu Mission in Zambia in 1905. King Lewanika of the Barotse people had invited Anderson to come into his territory and establish the mission.

Anderson walked 900 miles before deciding on a location. He described how he chose the site:

In locating the new mission there was a combination of four things that I especially desired. First, of course, was proximity to the native. A person can accomplish very little in laboring for the people unless he is near them. Secondly, we wanted a good supply of water...we wanted water for irrigation, that we might raise fruit and garden produce. Thirdly we desired proximity to the railway line... so I followed the watershed, in the hope that we might be near the railway line when it was built through the country.... The fourth point we desired was to establish an industrial mission, where the natives might be taught to work, which is one of the principles of the gospel. We therefore wanted good soil.

Anderson and his wife arrived on the farm the fifth of September 1905. He built their home, planted a garden, developed a farm, built a school-house, taught the school, and acted as doctor and nurse to the people who came to the station for help.

From this mission station, grew the Rusangu Primary School, the Rusangu Secondary School and eventually in 1975 the Rusangu Ministerial School. In 1993, the Rusangu Ministerial School changed its name to Zambia Adventist Seminary. A year later in 1994, the Seminary was closed to pave way for re-organization.

In 1997, plans to re-open the Seminary brought the idea of the Zambia Adventist College that would offer other courses in addition to theology and pastoral training. In 2000, an in-service program for serving church pastors began at Riverside Farm Institute in collaboration with Solusi University. With the full development of the Zambia Adventist College idea, this pastors' program finally moved back to the historic Rusangu Mission site in May 2003. Rapid developments have since given birth to a full-fledged Zambia Adventist university, now Rusangu University.

== Notable alumni ==
- Rupiah Banda, former Zambian President, PhD in Political Science
- Kenneth Kaunda, First President of Zambia, PhD in Political Science

== See also ==
- List of Seventh-day Adventist colleges and universities
- Seventh-day Adventist education
- Seventh-day Adventist Church
- Seventh-day Adventist theology
- History of the Seventh-day Adventist Church
- Adventist Colleges and Universities
- List of universities in Zambia
