= Cavendish University Zambia =

Private university in Lusaka, Zambia

- Motto: Success Begins at Cavendish University Zambia!
- Type: Private
- Established: 2004; 22 years ago
- Vice-Chancellor: Dr. Chilengwe
- Administrative staff: 120+
- Students: 5500+
- Location: Lusaka, Zambia; 15°24′11.77″S 28°16′42.92″E
- Campus: Great North Road campus situated at the corner of Great North and Washama road Villa Elizabeth, Lusaka, Zambia and the Long Acres Campus situated along Alick Nkhata Road right opposite UN offices
- Website: Official website

Cavendish University Zambia (CUZ) is a private university located in Lusaka, Zambia. It was opened in 2004 as a subsidiary of Cavendish College London and is the first private university to operate in Zambia. The university is registered with the Higher Education Authority which is a grant aided institution established under the Higher Education Act No. 4 of 2013. Cavendish is also affiliated with the Association of African Universities (AAU). Its sister university is Cavendish University Uganda. The university is now run by Maarifa Education Trust, which also runs a dozen universities around the world following the liquidation of Cavendish College London.

== Campuses ==
The university has two campuses that are both based in the capital, Lusaka:

- Cavendish University Main Campus - Villa Elizabeth, Lusaka
- Cavendish University Long acres Campus - Long acres, Lusaka

== Schools ==
Cavendish University Zambia offers various accredited programmes in four schools:

- School of Medicine
- School of Law
- School of Business and Information Technology
- School of Arts, Education and Social Sciences

== Notable Alumni ==
The following are the notable alumni of Cavendish University Zambia

- Hillary Chilomba
- Jean Chisenga
- Mutale Nalumango

== Chancellors ==
The first chancellor of the university was Kenneth Kaunda who held office from 2003 until his retirement on 26 October 2018 at Cavendish University's 11th graduation ceremony. He was succeeded by Rupiah Banda, who was chancellor until his death on 11 March 2022. Former president of Kenya Uhuru Kenyatta is tipped to be the next chancellor of the university.

== See also ==
- List of universities in Zambia
- Education in Zambia
