= Zambian Open University =

Private university in Zambia

- Motto: University without walls
- Type: Private
- Established: 2002; 24 years ago
- Founders: Mr. Edward Choolwe
- Academic affiliations: AAU, ACU, HEA
- Location: Lusaka, Zambia; 15.4270°S 28.1995°E
- Campus: Urban
- Nickname: ZAOU
- Website: zaou.ac.zm

Zambian Open University (ZAOU) is a private university, founded in 2002. It is one of the oldest private universities in Zambia. It is a member of the Association of Commonwealth Universities.

== School of Education ==
The School of Education is one of the two original Schools of the Zambian Open University (ZAOU) that started as soon as the university opened its doors to students in 2005. The other pioneer school was the School of Law and Social Sciences.

The School of Education started with three programmes namely Bachelor of Education in Adult Education, Bachelor of Education in Primary Education and Bachelor of Education in Secondary Education. Later the School developed three other programmes: Bachelor of Education in Early Childhood Education, Bachelor of Education in Guidance and Counselling and Bachelor of Education in Special Education.

In 2012, the university decided to abolish the School of Media, Performing and Fine Arts. As a result, Fine Arts was absorbed into the School of Humanities and Social Sciences, while Theatre Arts was incorporated in the School of Education, thus giving seven programmes to the School of Education, making it the biggest School in the university.

== School of Agricultural Sciences ==
The school offers several degree programmes.

Undergraduate programs offered:

- Bachelor of Science (Animal Science)
- Bachelor of Science (Agricultural Science with Education)
- Bachelor of Science ( Agribusiness Management)
- Bachelor of Science ( Agricultural Economics)
- Bachelor of Science ( Agricultural Extension)
- Bachelor of Science (Horticulture)
- Bachelor of Science (Plant Science)

== School of Humanities and Social Sciences ==
The School of Humanities and Social Sciences has three Departments, namely, Development Studies, Governance and Public Administration and Fine Arts. Each of these Departments offers a Degree Programme.

Undergraduate Degrees offered:

- Bachelor of Arts with Development Studies
- Bachelor of Arts in Governance and Public Administration
- Bachelor of Arts in Fine Arts
- Bachelor of Arts in Sociology
- Bachelor of Social Work

== School of Law ==
The School of Law at Zambian Open University is the second law school to be established in Zambia after the school of law at the University of Zambia. It is one of the oldest schools at ZAOU. The School of Law is currently the biggest Law School in Zambia.

== School of Graduate Studies ==
The Zambian Open University started offering post-graduate studies in 2006 with an intake of 15 students in one program – Master's degree of education in Literacy and Development. Since then more postgraduate programs have been introduced; including:

- Master of Business Administration
- Master of Business Administration (Human Resources Management)
- Master of Business Administration (Project Management)
- Master of Arts in History
- Master of Arts in Special Education
- Master of Arts in English Language and Linguistics
- Master of Arts in Linguistics and African Languages
- Master of Arts in Religious Studies
- Master of Arts in Transformative Community Development
- Master of Education in Early Childhood Education
- Master of Science in Geography
- Master of Education in Literacy and Development
- Master of Education in Management and Administration
- Master of Arts in Development Studies
- Master of Arts in Sociology
- Master of Arts in Trade, Development and International Relations
- Master of Arts in Criminal Justice
- Master of Laws (with various specializations)
- Master in Peace, Security and Strategic Studies(MPSSS)
- Master of Science in Plant Studies
- Master of Science in Agricultural Economics
- Master of Science in Animal Breeding and Genetics.

DOCTORATE PROGRAMS including:

- Doctor of Philosophy (PhD) in Business Administration
- Doctor of Philosophy (PhD) in Early Childhood Education
- Doctor of Philosophy (PhD) in Education, Management and Administration
- Doctor of Philosophy (PhD) in Geography
- Doctor of Philosophy (PhD) in History
- Doctor of Philosophy (PhD) in Special Education
- Doctor of Philosophy (PhD) in Applied Linguistics
- Doctor of Philosophy (PhD) in Literacy and Development
- Doctor of Philosophy in Religious Education
- Doctor of Philosophy (PhD) in Development Studies
- Doctor of Philosophy (PhD) in Sociology
- Doctor of Philosophy (PhD) in Law

== School of Business Studies ==
The School of business Studies offers a number of degree programmes which include Bachelors, Masters and PhD programmes. The Programmes are offered on full-time and open and distance learning.

=== ACCA Accreditation ===
Bachelor of Business Administration (Accounting) Degree Programme offered by the Zambian Open University was in January, 2020 accredited by the Association of Charted Certified Accountants (ACCA). In this regard ACCA members will be offered Exemptions in order to obtain a Degree in Bachelor of Business (Accountancy) offered by ZAOU.

== ZAOU students vs the Zambia Institute for Advanced Legal Education (ZIALE) ==
In 2009 the Lusaka High Court ordered the Zambia Institute for Advanced Legal Education (ZIALE) to enrol law students from Zambia Open University (ZAOU) for the 2009 and 2010 legal practitioners qualifying course after the student took ZIALE to court. The High Court Judge Nigel Mutuna in his judgment delivered in chambers also directed the counsel for ZIALE to certify the ZAOU law degree qualifications as being equivalent to those offered at the University of Zambia (UNZA).This move by ZAOU students enabled law students from other private universities to be enrolled at ZIALE to this day.

== Notable alumni ==
- Jean Kapata (Former Minister)
- Vincent Mwale (Former Minister)
- Coaster Mwansa (Media Personality)
- Simon Mwila Mulenga (Lawyer)

== See also ==
- List of universities in Zambia
