= Education in Zambia =

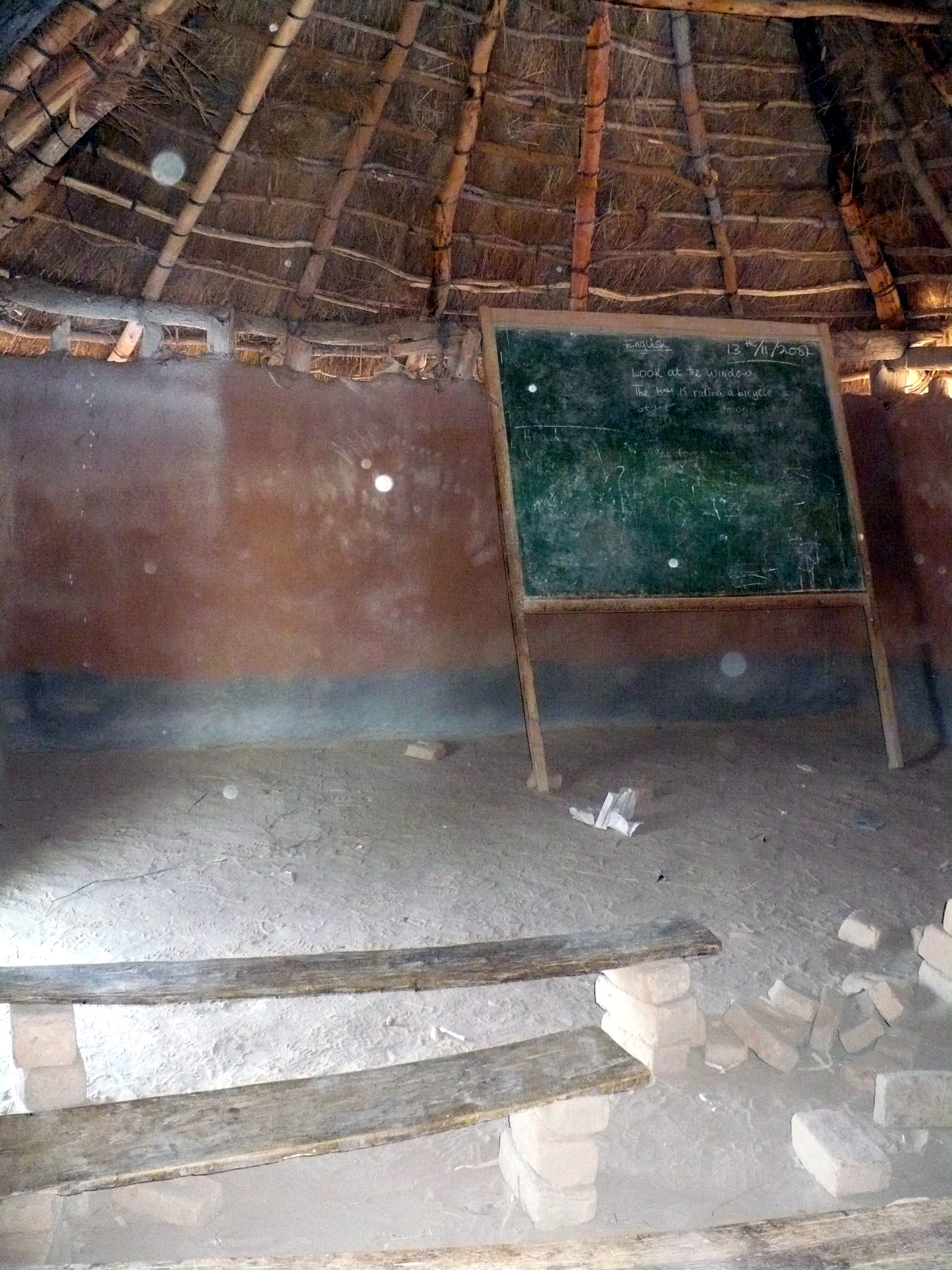
The interior of a rural Zambian primary school

Lower education in Zambia is divided into three levels and these are namely: primary, junior secondary and upper secondary. Higher education in Zambia has improved in the recent years due to the increase of private universities and colleges. The biggest university is the public University of Zambia which is located in the capital city of Lusaka along the Great East Road and hosts a number of local and international students. The Copperbelt University is the second largest public university and is located in the Copperbelt province of Zambia in Kitwe, and the youngest public university is Mulungushi University, with its main campus 26 km north of Kabwe. There are many other smaller universities, both public and private including the following:Gideon Robert University, Texila American University, Zambia Open University, European University Zambia Zambia Catholic University, Cavendish University, Zambia Adventist University, Northrise University, University of Lusaka, Lusaka Apex Medical University, Woodlands University College, Copperstone University College, University of Barotseland, University of Africa, Information and Communication University, Kwame Nkrumah University of Education, Chalimbana University, Rusangu University, Robert Makasa University, Zambia Centre of Accountancy Studies and there are various Health training Institutes offering Diplomas in clinical medicine.

== Early Childhood Education (ECE), Primary and secondary education ==
Education expenditure
Year	Percent
2013	17.5%
2014	20.2%
2015	20.2%
2016	17.2%
2017	16.5%
Annual education expenditure

Primary Education in Zambia is the foundation of every one who gets into school, going from grade 1 – 7 with students then expected to pass the exams set by the Examination Council of Zambia at the end of the grade 7 school year. Primary schools are spread in all parts of the country. Zambia has close to 110 Districts. Primary schools are owned by the government, the private sector and communities. Teachers work there voluntarily or for small stipends, unless these schools are sponsored by charities. Some community schools charge significant fees and resemble low-end private schools, but most are very cheap and cater to pupils for whom the local government school is too far away or imposes unaffordable costs such as uniforms.

With the exception of a few top private schools, Zambian schools are chronically under-resourced and educational standards extremely low.

Schooling falls into the following levels:

- ECE, preschool and reception
- Primary, grades 1–7
- Junior Secondary, grades 8–9
- Senior Secondary, grades 10–12

Upon completion of primary school, you can hopefully get directly into a secondary school (Secondary schools offer education from grade 8–12)- unfortunately there are areas in Zambia that have no secondary schools. Efforts have been made and they have basic schools. Traditionally, grades 8–9 were part of Basic school. This allowed pupils unable to access secondary school to continue their schooling up to Grade 9, and provides primary schools with additional income (as government schools are allowed to charge fees to Gardes 8 and 9). In rural areas some pupils move long distances to access primary education and this has been a disadvantage in the fight to educating the future generation.

=== Education system ===
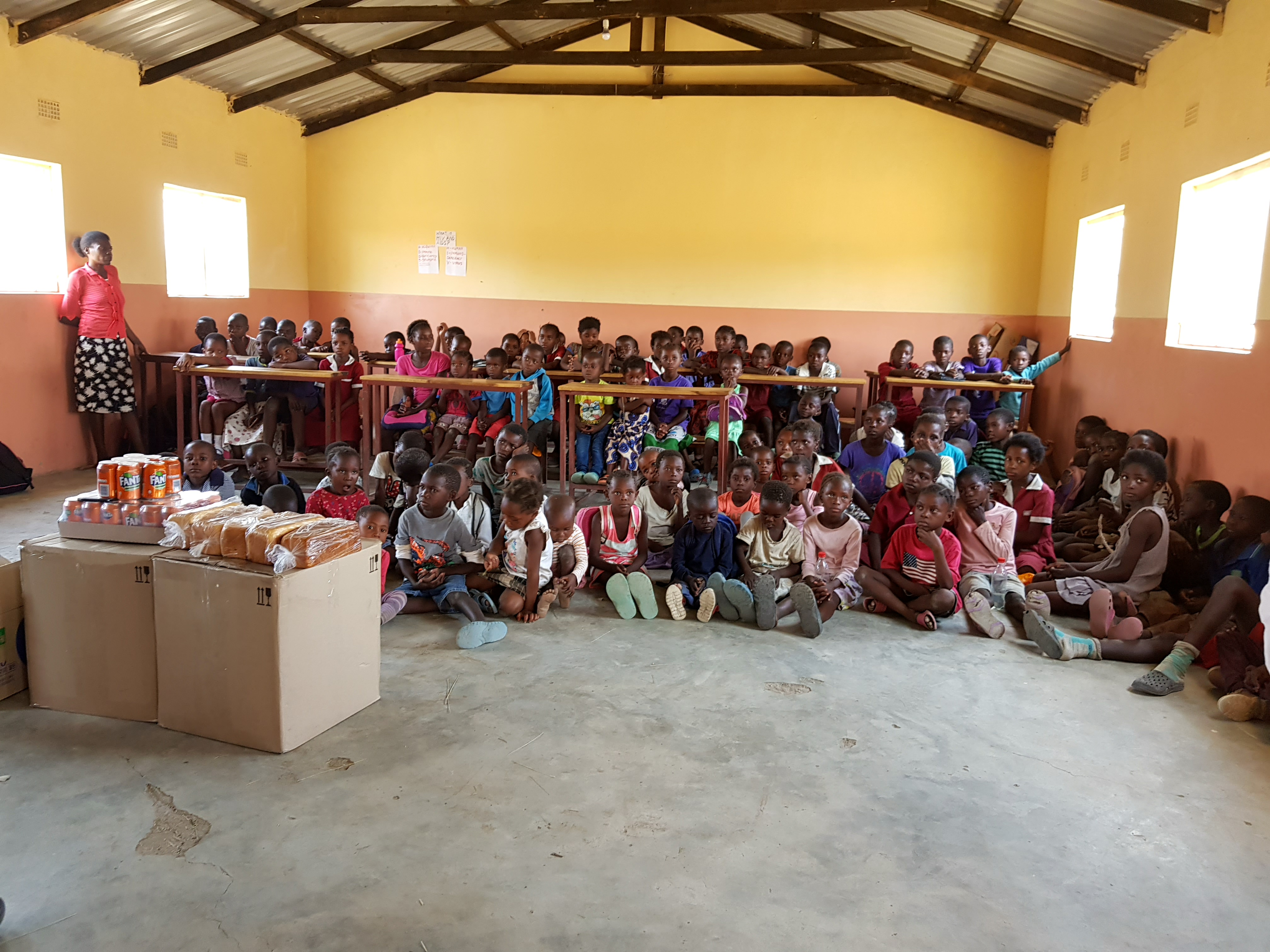
A classroom of children from rural homes

The Education system in Zambia is that of four levels:

==== Early Childhood Education level ====
- Preschool.
- Reception. (no National exam.)

==== Primary level ====
- Grade 1 to 7.
- Education at this level is free at all governments schools. (National exam.)

==== Junior Secondary school ====
- Grade 8 to 9.
- Theoretically free but many requirements

==== Senior Secondary ====
- Grade 10 to 12.
- Education at this level is free at all governments schools and grant aided schools as of 2022.
- Education system GCSE.
- ASAT at grade 9

== Higher education ==
In Zambia, there are three government universities and several technical schools that provide higher education. The Ministry of Science Technology and Vocational Training (MSTVT) in Zambia was also developed in 1992 to foster growth in technological fields. Educational opportunities beyond secondary school are limited in Zambia. After secondary school, students mostly study at the various colleges around the country. Normally they all select students on the basis of ability; competition for places is intense.

The introduction of fees in the late 1990s has made university level education inaccessible for some, although the government does theoretically provide state bursaries. Copperbelt University opened in the late 1980s, taking over most of the former Zambia Institute of Technology site in Kitwe. There are also several teacher training colleges offering two-year training programmes, while mission hospitals around the country offer internationally acceptable training for nurses. Several Christian schools offer seminary-level training.

There are three main universities and several others:

- University of Zambia (UNZA)
- Copperbelt University (CBU)
- Mulungushi University (MU)
- Gideon Robert University (GRU)
- Texila American University Zambia (TAU)
- DMI St. Eugene University (DMISEU)
- University of Lusaka (UNILUS)
- Rusangu University (RU)
- Cavendish University Zambia (CUZ)
- Lusaka Apex Medical University (LAMU)
- Zambia Open University (ZOU)
- Woodlands University College
- Kwame Nkrumah University (KWANU)
- University of Africa (UOA)
- University of Barotseland
- Information and Communication University (ICU)
- Mukuni University (MU)
- Eden University
- Kitwe College University of Education
- Africa Research University (ARU)

Additional Centres of Higher Education:

Apart from this universities and colleges, the country has also one of the oldest college offering distance education. Zambia College of Distance Education (ZACODE) formerly National Correspondence College has been in existence since 1963. The College had started from Evelyn Hone College then transferred from Lusaka to Luanshya. The college used to have 30000 learners and current crop of leaders in various institutions benefited from the materials the college produced and has continued to produce. Colleges and universities offering distance education must engage the college to help them improve on the distance materials being offered so that they become interactive.

- National Institute of Public Administration (NIPA)
- Northern Technical College (NORTEC)
- Natural Resources Development College (NRDC)
- The Evelyn Hone College
- University Teaching Hospital
- Ngoma Dolce Music Academy
- Northrise University
- Chikankata Nursing Training School
- Kabsy Consultancy Services
- University of Africa

Many charities support schools and pupils in Zambia to complete their education. Brighter Futures Zambia cover the fees of orphan and vulnerable children in Monze, Southern Province. Impact Network operates 10 schools in Zambia's Eastern Province using an innovative e-learning model. Cecily's Fund funds the school courses of over 11,000 children (as of June 2010). The charity also fully funds Bwafano Community School in Lusaka. Other charities include Camfed and Bakashana who support young women and girls in Zambia to complete school. The Sun-spring Charity School offers almost free education to disadvantaged children in Ng’ombe township just outside Lusaka.

== Support from charities ==
Many charities support schools and pupils in Zambia to complete their education. Sun-spring Charity School offers free basic education to Orphaned and Vulnerable Children, Brighter Futures Zambia cover the fees of orphan and vulnerable children in Monze, Southern Province. Impact Network operates 10 schools in Zambia's Eastern Province using an innovative e-learning model. Cecily's Fund funds the school courses of over 11,000 children (as of June 2010). The charity also fully funds Bwafano Community School in Lusaka. Other charities include Camfed, Bakashana, and Insaka who support young women and girls in Zambia to complete school. Finally, FVL Schools from Appleton, Wisconsin partners with Lutheran Schools in Lusaka and have given over $60,000 to build kitchens, provide food, and purchase school supplies.

== See also ==
- List of schools in Zambia
- List of universities in Zambia
- List of colleges in Zambia
- Bibliography of the history of Zambia
