= Janet Adam Smith =

Scottish writer, editor, and journalist (1905–1999)

- Born: Janet Buchanan Adam Smith; 9 December 1905; Glasgow, Scotland
- Died: 11 September 1999 (aged 93); London, England
- Occupations: Writer, editor
- Writing career
- Language: English
- Genre: Journalism

Janet Buchanan Adam Smith OBE (9 December 1905 – 11 September 1999) was a Scottish writer, editor, literary journalist, and champion of Scottish literature. She was active from the 1930s through to the end of the century.

Leonard Miall wrote: "Biographer, mountaineer, critic, literary editor, textual scholar, comic versifier, visiting professor, hostess, anthologist, traveller – there seemed to be nothing at which Janet Adam Smith did not shine. And she shone with an intensity that made others glow in response".

== Family background and education ==
She was born into the old Scots intellectual elite. Her father, Sir George Adam Smith FBA (1856–1942), was a Biblical scholar, Professor of Hebrew and Old Testament exegesis, at the Free Church College in Glasgow, and then, from 1909 to 1935, Principal of University of Aberdeen. Her mother was Lilian Adam Smith, daughter of Sir George Buchanan, FRS, in whose honour the Royal Society's Buchanan Medal was created.

In 1919, Janet went to Cheltenham Ladies' College, and in 1923 went on to Somerville College, Oxford, where she read English, graduating in 1926.

== Family life ==
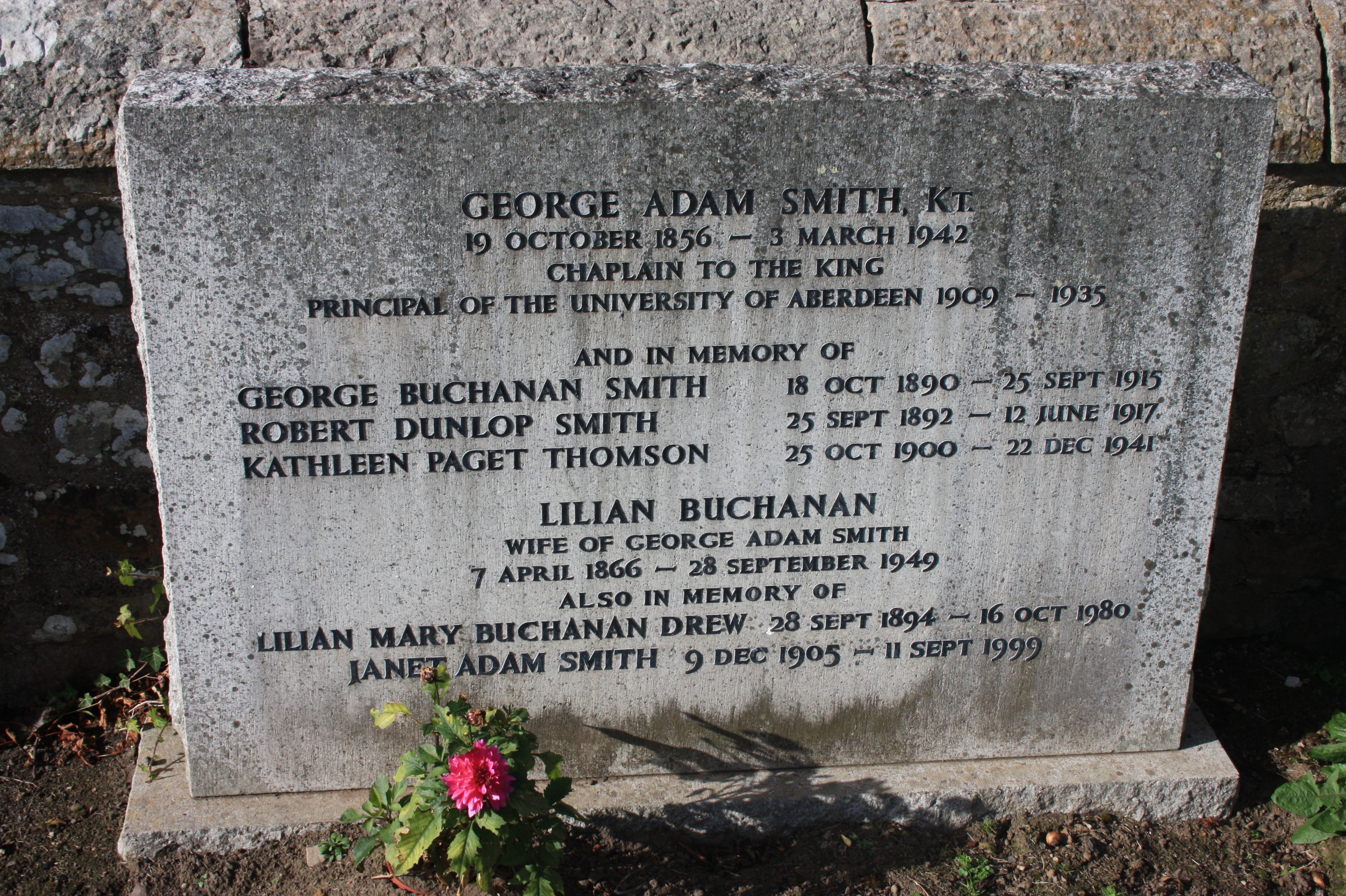
Memorial to Janet Adam Smith, Currie Churchyard

In 1935 she married Michael Roberts, who was a poet, critic, editor, mathematician, and, like her, a passionate mountaineer. Roberts's anthologies of contemporary verse had already established him as, in T.S. Eliot's phrase, "expositor and interpreter of the poetry of his generation".

They lived in Newcastle upon Tyne (where he taught at the Royal Grammar School), then from 1939 in Penrith (where the school was evacuated during the war). In 1945 the family moved to London, where Michael Roberts had become Principal of the College of St Mark and St John, in Chelsea (which later moved to Plymouth and became the University of St Mark & St John). They had four children: Andrew Roberts, Professor of the History of Africa at the University of London, b. 1937; Henrietta Dombey, Professor of Literacy in Primary Education at the University of Brighton, b. 1939; Adam Roberts, Professor of International Relations at Oxford University, b. 1940; and John Roberts, writer on energy issues and Middle East politics, b. 1947.

Michael Roberts died on 13 December 1948. Shortly after, the family moved to a house in the Notting Hill area of London, which remained her home until her death in 1999. In 1965, she married John Dudley Carleton, headmaster of Westminster School from 1957 to 1970. He died on 6 November 1974.

Janet died on 11 September 1999 and is remembered on her parents' grave in Currie churchyard, southwest of Edinburgh. The grave stands in the north-east corner of the modern cemetery extension south of the church.

== Career and writing ==
She joined the BBC in 1928, and from 1930 to 1935 was assistant editor of The Listener. As assistant editor, she dealt with articles on art, selected reviewers for literary books, and published new poetry, especially the work of W.H. Auden, Stephen Spender, Herbert Read, Louis MacNeice and Michael Roberts. Her work at The Listener has been widely praised. Dr Kate Murphy, Senior Lecturer in History at Bournemouth University, has said of Janet Adam Smith that "her six years on The Listener were without question of huge import to the journal and she left a legacy that was remembered for decades to come."

In 1935, she published Poems of Tomorrow, an anthology of poems from The Listener, and in 1936 succeeded Michael Roberts as chief reviewer of poetry in T.S. Eliot's quarterly The Criterion. Between 1936 and 1939 she wrote over a hundred reviews for London weeklies, of books by Scots writers or on Scottish subjects.

Finding herself with three small children in Penrith during the war, while Michael worked in London for the BBC's European Service, she wrote Mountain Holidays (1946; reissued 1996), in which she recalled pre-war climbs in Scotland and the Alps.

In London from 1945 onward, she continued to write and edit. To the series Britain in Pictures, she contributed Life among the Scots (1946) and Children's Illustrated Books (1948). Her short biography (1937) had already established her as an authority on Robert Louis Stevenson. She now edited the correspondence between Stevenson and Henry James (1948) and prepared a scholarly edition of Stevenson's collected poems (1950), both published by Rupert Hart-Davis.

In 1948, left a widow with four young children to educate, she returned to a salaried position in journalism, becoming first assistant literary editor (1949–52), then literary editor (1952–60), of the New Statesman, still the house magazine of the intellectual Left. One of her successors, Karl Miller, recalled that "Janet used to take the trouble of writing to people to tell them what was wrong with their articles". Miller saw her – and himself – as "Edinburgh reviewers, latter-day examples of an auld Scots element in literary journalism".

She still found time for her own work: almost 20 years after Michael Roberts had edited, at T.S. Eliot’s invitation, the classic anthology, the Faber Book of Modern Verse, she matched his achievement with the Faber Book of Children's Verse (1953). She also edited Michael Roberts's Collected Poems (1958) and, with her friend and fellow climber Nea Morin, translated from the French several mountaineering books, notably Maurice Herzog's Annapurna (1952).

In 1961 and 1964, she was Virginia Gildersleeve Visiting Professor at Barnard College, New York.

When, at the request of the Buchan family, she came to write her biography of John Buchan (1965), her understanding of Buchan's temperament and habit of mind owed much to their common cultural background of the democratic and independent-minded Free Church.

Most of her papers are in the National Library of Scotland, at Edinburgh.

== Public service ==
Imbued with the tradition of public service, she was a Trustee of the National Library of Scotland from 1950 to 1985, and president of the Royal Literary Fund from 1976 to 1984.

== Honours and distinctions ==
She received an honorary degree (Hon. LL.D.) from Aberdeen University in 1962 and was made an OBE in the 1982 New Year Honours for services to Scottish literature.

== Mountains and mountaineering ==
She was a hill-walker and mountaineer. In the 1950s she organized many parties of friends and older children to the Alps to climb and to enjoy the pleasures of mobile holidays. She did a number of classic Alpine routes, including the Mer de Glace face of the Aiguille du Grépon (1955) and the traverse of the Meije (1958). She served as vice-president of the Alpine Club, 1978–80; and was elected to honorary membership of the club in 1993.

Janet and Michael Roberts had built up a large collection of books on mountaineering, which, along with the collection of the Oxford University Mountaineering Club, provided a basis for establishment in December 1992 of the Oxford Mountaineering Library. Since 2019 this has been based in the Geography collections in the Social Science Library in the Manor Road Building, Oxford OX1 3UQ.

== Assessment of her literary contribution ==
In an obituary published in The Scotsman shortly after her death in September 1999, the Scottish novelist and journalist Allan Massie wrote:

“The critical study of Scottish literature owes much to Janet Adam Smith. … Ernest Mehew, the editor of the great Yale University edition of Stevenson's Letters, paid tribute to the ‘leading part’ she played ‘in the revival of critical interest in Stevenson's life and work at a time when he was largely ignored in academic circles’. He referred to the biography, her edition of Stevenson's correspondence with Henry James, and her two editions of Stevenson's poetry (1950 and 1971) – ‘a major work of scholarship which has not been superseded’.

“Stevenson was not alone in benefiting from her enthusiastic and discriminating advocacy. Two lectures on Sir Walter Scott and the Idea of Scotland, given at the University of Edinburgh in 1963, gave an impetus to the revival of academic interest in Scott. Her analysis of Waverley is unsurpassed.

“But her masterpiece was her biography of John Buchan. It is probably hard for people today to realise just how low Buchan's reputation stood in the early Sixties. He was dismissed as a mere entertainer with disreputable political and social views. Janet Adam Smith corrected misconceptions and restored him to his proper status as a serious writer and public figure. Everyone who has written subsequently on Buchan is in her debt. Like all her work, the biography was written with a beautiful and authoritative lucidity."

“Though she wrote no major work after Buchan, she remained an industrious literary journalist … She remained intellectually alert and eager to read new work into extreme old age. …"

“Based in England throughout her adult life, she nevertheless remained committed to Scotland and Scottish literature. Karl Miller was right in seeing her as being an heir of the Edinburgh Reviewers, for she was one of the last representatives of the Scottish Enlightenment, marrying clear and bold thinking to generous feeling."

== Books by Janet Adam Smith ==
- (ed.) Poems of Tomorrow: An Anthology of Contemporary Verse chosen from The Listener, Chatto & Windus, London, 1935;
- Robert Louis Stevenson, Duckworth, London, 1937;
- Mountain Holidays, Dent, London, 1946, 2nd edn., Ernest Press, Glasgow, 1996;
- Life Among the Scots, Collins, London, 1946;
- Children's Illustrated Books, Collins, London, 1948;
- (ed.) Henry James and Robert Louis Stevenson: A Record of Friendship and Criticism, Rupert Hart-Davis, London, 1948;
- (ed.) Robert Louis Stevenson: Collected Poems, Rupert Hart-Davis, London, 1950; 2nd edn., 1971;
- (ed.) Faber Book of Children’s Verse, Faber and Faber, London, 1953;
- (ed.) Michael Roberts: Collected Poems, Faber and Faber, London, 1958;
- (ed.) The Looking Glass Book of Verse, Looking Glass Library, Random House, New York, 1959;
- John Buchan: A Biography, Rupert Hart-Davis, London, 1965;
- (ed.) The Living Stream: An Anthology of Twentieth-century Verse, Faber and Faber, London, 1969;
- John Buchan and his World, Thames and Hudson, London, 1979;
- An Autobiography, 1905–1926, with preface by Andrew D. Roberts, privately printed, London, 2005.

== Translations by Janet Adam Smith ==
- (trans.) R. Frison-Roche, First on the Rope: A Novel, Methuen, London, 1949; 2nd edn., Vertebrate Publishing, Sheffield, 2019;
- (trans. jointly with Nea Morin) R. Frison-Roche, The Last Crevasse, Methuen, London, 1952;
- (trans. jointly with Nea Morin) Maurice Herzog, Annapurna, Cape, London, 1952; subsequent edns., various publishers, 1974, 1986, 1997 & 2011;
- (trans. jointly with Nea Morin) Bernard Pierre, A Mountain Called Nun Kun, Hodder and Stoughton, London, 1955;
- (trans. jointly with Nea Morin) G. Gervasutti, Gervasutti's Climbs, Rupert Hart-Davis, London, 1957; 2nd edn., Diadem, Leicester, 1978.

== See also ==
- Michael Roberts (writer)
- Alpine Club
- The Listener

== Other sources ==
- Nicolas Barker, obituary: "Janet Adam Smith: A Woman of Substance in Literature and Mountaineering", The Guardian, London, 14 September 1999.
- Allan Massie, obituary, The Scotsman, 14 September 1999.
- Leonard Miall, "Obituary: Janet Adam Smith", The Independent, London, 13 September 1999.
- John D. Haigh, entry in the Oxford Dictionary of National Biography, Oxford University Press, 2004; online edition Oct. 2005.
