= John Roberts (writer) =

British journalist and author

John Roberts (born 28 June 1947) is a British writer specialising in the inter-relationship between energy issues and politics. He currently writes for Platts, a provider of energy and metals information and a source of benchmark price assessments in the physical energy markets.

== Life ==
John Roberts is the youngest son of the poet, Michael Roberts and of the writer and editor Janet Adam Smith. His older siblings are: Andrew Roberts, former professor of the History of Africa at the University of London, Henrietta Dombey, Professor of Literacy in Primary Education at the University of Brighton, and Sir Adam Roberts, President of the British Academy. He is married to Ann Milnes Roberts.

== Career ==
Trained by Reuters News Agency, from 1978 to 1980 Roberts covered the return of Lebanon to civil war, including the Israeli occupation of Southern Lebanon in March 1978 – Operation Litani. He joined the Middle East Economic Digest in 1980 and was MEED's U.S. Editor from 1984 to 1988 and then Washington Bureau Chief for Al Hayat Newspaper from 1988 to 1989.

In 1990, he broke the news that Saddam Hussein was determined to re-open Iraq's boundary dispute with Kuwait, the issue that led to the Gulf Crisis and War of 1990–1991. As editor of Middle East Monitor in the 1990s, he reported on the emergence of Kurdish autonomy in northern Iraq, the changing fortunes of the Arab World, Iran in an era characterised by international sanctions, and the slow recovery of trust between OPEC producer states and industrialised consuming nations.

Currently, Roberts writes and lectures on energy security and environmental issues, including producer-consumer relations, water management in Central Asia, Turkey and the Middle East, and the interlinked relationships between the European Union and its oil and gas suppliers in Russia, the Caspian and the Middle East.

In assessing global energy security issues, he has regularly toured the Gulf and the Caspian, as well as visiting the Alaskan North Slope Pipeline, the Athabasca Tar Sands, Norway, and Venezuela. He is one of the foremost analysts on the potential of the Caspian, and has worked with companies, governments and think tanks on a host of global energy issues, notably those concerning Caspian and OPEC producers and their relations with transit and consumer states.

== Books by John Roberts ==
- Lebanon, The Summer of '82 (Liban, L'Été '82)
- Visions & Mirages: The Middle East in a New Era (Mainstream, Edinburgh, 1995)
- Caspian Pipelines (Royal Institute of International Affairs, London 1996)
- Pipeline Politics (Chatham House, 2007)
