= Bibliography of the history of Zambia =

List of works on the history of Zambia

Republic of Zambia Icitungu ca Zambia (Bemba)
- Flag Coat of arms

- Capital and largest city: Lusaka; 15°25′S 28°17′E
- Official languages: English
- Religion: Christianity (State religion)
- Demonym: Zambian
- Currency: Zambian kwacha (ZMW)
- Time zone: CAT
- ISO 3166 code: ZM

This is a select bibliography of English-language books (including translations) and journal articles about the history of Zambia.

Zambia, (Note: /ˈzæmbiə, ˈzɑːm-/) officially the Republic of Zambia, (Note: Bemba: Icalo ca Zambia; Tonga: Cisi ca Zambia; Tumbuka: Chalo cha Zambia; Lozi: Naha ya Zambia; Chichewa: Dziko la Zambia) is a landlocked country at the crossroads of Central, Southern and East Africa. (Note: Due to its particular location, Zambia is sometimes grouped with Central Africa, sometimes in Southern Africa, and occasionally with Eastern Africa nations.) The territory of Zambia was known as Northern Rhodesia from 1911 to 1964. It was renamed Zambia in October 1964 on its independence from British rule. The name Zambia derives from the Zambezi River (Zambezi means "the grand river").

Zambia's history includes precolonial kingdoms such as the Bemba, Lozi, and Chewa, and links to the Luba-Lunda empires. In the late 1800s, British control began through the British South Africa Company, and in 1911, the area became the colony of Northern Rhodesia. The economy focused on copper mining, which relied on migrant labor and created deep inequalities. After growing nationalist movements, led by Kenneth Kaunda, Zambia gained independence in 1964. Kaunda led a one-party state until 1991, when the country shifted to multi-party democracy. Since then, Zambia has faced economic and political challenges but has remained relatively peaceful.

Works listed here are cited in the notes or bibliographies of scholarly sources. Each is published by an academic or major press, written by a recognized expert, or substantially reviewed in scholarly journals; borderline cases are omitted. A selection of primary sources are included. Many of the books below carry their own bibliographies; see Further reading for longer ones, and External links for historical sites and museums.

Citations follow APA style. (Note: Entries are in plain text APA 7 format without templates; templates are used only for reviews and notes.) Book have citations to academic journal or mainstream published reviews when available. For books only partly about the subject, give relevant chapter or section titles where useful and available. Translators of the original-language edition are included when possible. In cases where a title or name has appeared with more than one English spelling, use the most recent published form is used and a footnote documents any earlier title under which the work appeared.

== General works about Zambian history ==
- Phiri, B. J. (2006). A political history of Zambia: From the colonial period to the 3rd republic. Africa World Press.
- Roberts, A. D. (1976). A history of Zambia. Heinemann.

== Archeology and prehistory ==
- Barham, L. S. (2000). The Middle Stone Age of Zambia, South Central Africa. Journal of World Prehistory, 14(1), 1–72.
- Barham, L. S. (2002). Systematic pigment use in the Middle Pleistocene of south-central Africa. Current Anthropology, 43(1), 181–190.
- Barham, L. S. (2013). Current themes in Middle Stone Age research in eastern and central Africa. South African Archaeological Bulletin, 68(197), 59–62.
- Barham, L. S., Duller, G. A. T., Candy, I., Scott, C., & Cartwright, C. R. (2023). Evidence for the earliest structural use of wood at least 476,000 years ago. Nature, 621(7977), 312–316.
- Barham, L. S., Tooth, S., Duller, G. A. T., Plater, A. J., & Turner, S. D. (2015). Excavations at Site C North, Kalambo Falls, Zambia: New insights into the Mode 2/3 transition in south-central Africa. Journal of African Archaeology, 13(2), 187–214. (Note: See Kalambo Falls for further information.)
- Bisson, M. S. (1974). Prehistoric copper mining in northwestern Zambia. Archaeology, 27(4), 242–247.
- Bisson, M. S. (1992). A Survey of Late Stone Age and Iron Age Sites at Luano, Zambia. World Archaeology, 24(2), 234–248.
- Dart, R. A. (1953). Rhodesian Engravers, Painters and Pigment Miners of the Fifth Millennium B.C. The South African Archaeological Bulletin, 8(32), 91–96.
- de Luna, K. M. (2012). Surveying the Boundaries of Historical Linguistics and Archaeology: Early Settlement in South Central Africa. The African Archaeological Review, 29(2/3), 209–251.
- Derricourt, R. M. (1976). The Chronology of Zambian Prehistory. Transafrican Journal of History, 5(1), 1–31.
- Derricourt, R. M. (1976). Iron Age history and archaeology in Zambia. The Journal of African History, 17(2), 191–209.
- Derricourt, R. M. (1980). People of the Lakes: Archaeological studies in northern Zambia. Manchester University Press.
- Derricourt, R. M. (1985). Man on the Kafue: The archaeology and history of the Itezhitezhi area of Zambia. University of California Press.
- Derricourt, R. M., Peters, L. R., & Maluma, E. (1976). Itezhitezhi: Archaeology and Salvage in Zambia. Current Anthropology, 17(3), 497–500.
- Dombrowski, P., & Malipula, M. (2022). Archaeological survey in the Machili Valley, Zambia: A report on the 2019 preliminary field season. Azania: Archaeological Research in Africa, 57(3), 332–349.
- Dombrowski, P., & Malipula, M. (2024). Magnetometry at two Iron Age villages in Western Zambia. Journal of Archaeological Science: Reports, 49, 103956.
- Duller, G. A. T., Tooth, S., Barham, L., & Tsukamoto, S. (2015). New investigations at Kalambo Falls, Zambia: Luminescence chronology, site formation, and archaeological significance. Journal of Human Evolution, 85, 111–125.
- Fagan, B. M. (1961). Pre-European Ironworking in Central Africa with Special Reference to Northern Rhodesia. The Journal of African History, 2(2), 199–210.
- Fagan, B. M. (1966). The Iron Age of Zambia. Current Anthropology, 7(4), 453–462.
- Fagan, B. M. (1967). Iron Age Cultures in Zambia: Volume 1: Kalomo and Kangila. Chatto & Windus.
- Fagan, B. M., & Van Noten, F. L. (1971). The hunter-gatherers of Gwisho. Musée royal de l'Afrique centrale. (Note: For further information, see Gwisho Hot-Springs.)
- Fagan, B. M., Phillipson, D. W., & Daniels, S. G. H. (1969). Iron Age cultures in Zambia, Volume Two: Dambwa, Ingombe Ilede, and the Tonga. Chatto & Windus.
- Inskeep, R. R. (1978). An Iron-Smelting Furnace in Southern Zambia. The South African Archaeological Bulletin, 33(128), 113–117.
- Mitchell, P. (2002). The archaeology of Southern Africa. Cambridge University Press.
- Musonda F. B. (1984). Late Pleistocene and Holocene Microlithic Industries from the Lunsemfwa Basin, Zambia. The South African Archaeological Bulletin, 39(139), 24–36.
- Musonda, F. B. (1987). The Significance of Pottery in Zambian Later Stone Age Contexts. The African Archaeological Review, 5, 147–158.
- Musonda, F. B. (2012). 100 years of archaeological research in Zambia: Changing historical perspectives. The South African Archaeological Bulletin, 67(195), 88–100.
- Musonda, F. B. (2014). Exploring differences and finding connections in archaeology and history practice and teaching in the Livingstone Museum and the University of Zambia, 1973 to 2016. Zambia Social Science Journal, 5(2), Article 6. Exploring Differences and Finding Connections in Archaeology and History Practice and Teaching in the Livingstone Museum and the University of Zambia, 1973 to 2016
- Phillipson, D. W. (1968). The Early Iron Age in Zambia-Regional Variants and Some Tentative Conclusions. The Journal of African History, 9(2), 191–211.
- Phillipson, D. W. (1974). Iron Age History and Archaeology in Zambia. The Journal of African History, 15(1), 1–25.
- Phillipson, D. W. (1976). The Early Iron Age in Zambia—Regional variants and some tentative conclusions. The Journal of African History, 17(1), 43–65. Cambridge University Press.
- Phillipson, D. W. (1976). Iron Age history and archaeology in Zambia. The Journal of African History, 17(2), 197–209. Cambridge University Press.
- Phillipson, D. W. (1976). The Early Iron Age in eastern and southern Africa: A critical re-appraisal. Azania: Archaeological Research in Africa, 11(1), 1–26.
- Phillipson, D. W. (1976). The Prehistory of Eastern Zambia. British Institute in Eastern Africa.
- Phillipson, D. W. (1977). The Later Prehistory of Eastern and Southern Africa. New York: Africana Publishing Company.
- Phillipson, D. W. (2000). Early Iron Age archaeology in central Zambia. Azania: Archaeological Research in Africa, 35(1), 147–182.
- Phillipson, D. W. (2005). African archaeology (3rd ed.). Cambridge University Press.
- Shaw, T., Sinclair, P., Andah, B., & Okpoko, A. (Eds.). (1993). The archaeology of Africa: Food, metals and towns. Routledge.
- Vogel, J. O. (1976). The Early Iron Age in Western Zambia. Current Anthropology, 17(1), 153–154.
- Vogel, J. O. (1978). The Gokomere Tradition. The South African Archaeological Bulletin, 33(127), 12–17.
- Vogel, J. O. (1986). Subsistence Settlement Systems in the Prehistory of Southwestern Zambia. Human Ecology, 14(4), 397–414.

== Pre-colonial era ==
- Langworthy, H. W. (1972). Zambia before 1890: Aspects of pre-colonial history. Longman.
- Mainga, M. (2010). Mainga: Bulozi under the Luyana Kings: Political Evolution and State Formation in Pre-Colonial Zambia. Gadsden Publishers.
- Roberts, A. D. (1973). A history of the Bemba: Political growth and change in north-eastern Zambia before 1900. University of Wisconsin Press.

== Colonial Rhodesia era ==
- Allen, R. (1981). Reassessing African Political Activity in Urban Northern Rhodesia. African Affairs, 80(319), 239–258.
- Ault, J. M. (1983). Making “Modern” Marriage “Traditional”: State Power and the Regulation of Marriage in Colonial Zambia. Theory and Society, 12(2), 181–210.
- Baldwin, R. E. (1966). Economic development and export growth: A study of Northern Rhodesia, 1920–1960. University of California Press.
- Brown, R. (1973). Anthropology and Colonial Rule: Godfrey Wilson and the Rhodes-Livingstone Institute. In T. Asad (Ed.), Anthropology and the Colonial Encounter, 173–198. Humanities Press.
- Caplan, G. L. (2022). The Elites of Barotseland 1878–1969: A Political History of Zambia's Western Province. University of California Press.
- Chipungu, S. N. (1986). Locusts, peasants, settlers and the state in Northern Rhodesia (Zambia), 1929 to 1940. Transafrican Journal of History, 15, 54–80.
- Datta, K. (1988). The Political Economy of Rural Development in Colonial Zambia: The Case of the Ushi-Kabende, 1947-1953. The International Journal of African Historical Studies, 21(2), 249–272.
- Gann, L. H. (1964). The birth of a plural society: The development of Northern Rhodesia under the British South Africa Company, 1894–1914. Manchester University Press.
- Gewald, J. B. (2015). Forged in the Great War: People, transport, and labour, the establishment of colonial rule in Zambia, 1890–1920. Brill.
- Gordon, D. (2001). Owners of the Land and Lunda Lords: Colonial Chiefs in the Borderlands of Northern Rhodesia and the Belgian Congo. The International Journal of African Historical Studies, 34(2), 315–338.
- Gordon, D. M. (2009). The Abolition of the Slave Trade and the Transformation of the South-Central African Interior during the Nineteenth Century. The William and Mary Quarterly, 66(4), 915–938.
- Gray, R. (1961). The Two Nations: Aspects of the Development of Race Relations in the Rhodesias and Nyasaland. Oxford University Press.
- Heisler, H. (1971). The Creation of a Stabilized Urban Society: A Turning Point in the Development of Northern Rhodesia/Zambia. African Affairs, 70(279), 125–145.
- Henderson, I. (1970). The Origins of Nationalism in East and Central Africa: The Zambian Case. The Journal of African History, 11(4), 591–603.
- Isaacman, A., & Isaacman, B. (1977). Resistance and Collaboration in Southern and Central Africa, c. 1850-1920. The International Journal of African Historical Studies, 10(1), 31–62.
- Kalusa, W. T. (2011). The Killing of Lilian Margaret Burton and Black and White Nationalisms in Northern Rhodesia (Zambia) in the 1960s. Journal of Southern African Studies, 37(1), 63–77.
- Larmer, M. (2011). Rethinking African Politics: A History of Opposition in Zambia. Ashgate.
- Lungu, G. F. (1993). Educational Policy-Making in Colonial Zambia: The Case of Higher Education for Africans from 1924 to 1964. The Journal of Negro History, 78(4), 207–232.
- Macmillan, H. (1993). An African Trading Empire: The Story of Susman Brothers and Wulfsohn, 1901–2005. I.B. Tauris.
- Macola, G. (2008). The Kingdom of Kazembe: History and Politics in North-Eastern Zambia and Katanga to 1950. Verlag.<
- Marks, S.A. (2004). Reconfiguring a Political Landscape: Transforming Slaves and Chiefs in Colonial Northern Rhodesia. Journal of Colonialism and Colonial History 5(3)
- Meebelo, H. S. (1971). Reaction to colonialism: A prelude to the politics of independence in Northern Zambia, 1893–1939. Manchester University Press.
- Money, D. (2022). War and society in colonial Zambia, 1939–1953. Ohio University Press.
- Mulford, D. C. (1964). The Northern Rhodesia general election, 1962. Oxford University Press.
- Mulford, D. C. (1967). Zambia: The Politics of Independence, 1957–1964. Oxford University Press.
- Musambachime, M. C. (1989). Escape from tyranny: Flights across the Rhodesia-Congo boundary, 1900–1930. Transafrican Journal of History, 18, 147–159.
- Musambachime, M. C. (1981). The Impact of British Rule on the Bemba Political System, 1890–1939. African Studies Review, 24(1), 1–25.
- Palmer, R. H. (1971). War and land in Rhodesia. Transafrican Journal of History, 1(2), 43–62.
- Parpart, J. L. (1994). “Where Is Your Mother?”: Gender, Urban Marriage, and Colonial Discourse on the Zambian Copperbelt, 1924-1945. The International Journal of African Historical Studies, 27(2), 241–271.
- Phiri, B. J. (1991). The Capricorn Africa Society Revisited: The Impact of Liberalism in Zambia's Colonial History, 1949-1963. The International Journal of African Historical Studies, 24(1), 65–83.
- Phiri, B. J. (2022). African participation and experiences in the First and Second World Wars in Northern Rhodesia, 1914–1948: A historical perspective. Journal of Asian and African Studies, 57(1), 3–19.
- Prins, G. (1990). The battle for control of the camera in late nineteenth century Western Zambia. African Affairs, 89(354), 97–105.
- Ranger, T. (1980). Making Northern Rhodesia Imperial: Variations on a Royal Theme, 1924-1938. African Affairs, 79(316), 349–373.
- Rennie, J. K. (1978). White Farmers, Black Tenants and Landlord Legislation: Southern Rhodesia 1890-1930. Journal of Southern African Studies, 5(1), 86–98.
- Rotberg, R. I. (1965). Christian missionaries and the creation of Northern Rhodesia 1880–1924. Princeton University Press.
- Rotberg, R. I. (1965). The Rise of Nationalism in Central Africa: The Making of Malawi and Zambia, 1873–1964. Harvard University Press.
- Rotberg, R. I. (2022). Black heart: Gore-Browne and the politics of multiracial Zambia. University of California Press.
- Slinn, P. (1971). Commercial concessions and politics during the colonial period: The role of the British South Africa Company in Northern Rhodesia 1890–1964. African Affairs, 70(281), 365–384.
- Stapleton, T. J. (2006). No insignificant part: The Rhodesia Native Regiment and the East Africa Campaign of the First World War. Wilfrid Laurier University Press.
- Tembo, A. (2013). Rubber Production in Northern Rhodesia During the Second World War, 1942-1946. African Economic History 41, 223-255.
- Tembo, A. (2021). War and society in colonial Zambia, 1939–1953. Ohio University Press.
- Vickery, K. P. (1986). Black and White in Southern Zambia: The Tonga Plateau Economy and British Imperialism, 1890–1939. Greenwood Press.
- Zaffiro, J. J. (1993). Zambia: The politics of independence, 1957–1964. Lynne Rienner Publishers.

== Independent Zambia ==
- Baylies, C., & Szeftel, M. (1992). The Fall and Rise of Multi-Party Politics in Zambia. Review of African Political Economy, 19(54), 75–91.
- Burdette, M. M. (1977). Nationalization in Zambia: A Critique of Bargaining Theory. Canadian Journal of African Studies / Revue Canadienne Des Études Africaines, 11(3), 471–496.
- Burdette, M. M. (1988). Zambia: Between Two Worlds. Westview Press.
- Burnell, P. (1995). The Politics of Poverty and the Poverty of Politics in Zambia's Third Republic. Third World Quarterly, 16(4), 675–690.
- Burnell, P. (2001). The Party System and Party Politics in Zambia: Continuities Past, Present and Future. African Affairs, 100(399), 239–263.
- Burnell, P. (2002). Parliamentary Committees in Zambia's Third Republic: Partial Reforms; Unfinished Agenda. Journal of Southern African Studies, 28(2), 291–313.
- Cheelo, C., & Ndhlovu, D. (2020). [Economic Management in Zambia under the Patriotic Front Government]. Journal of Southern African Studies, 46 (5), 909–926.
- Cheeseman, N., & Hinfelaar, M. (2010). Parties, Platforms, and Political Mobilization: The Zambian Presidential Election of 2008. African Affairs, 109(434), 51–76.
- Chibuye, M. (2011). Poverty levels in Zambia. In Interrogating urban poverty lines: The case of Zambia (pp. 5–9). International Institute for Environment and Development.
- Chikulo, B. C. (1988). The Impact of Elections in Zambia's One Party Second Republic. Africa Today, 35(2), 37–49.
- Fraser, A. (2010). Zambia: Back to the Future? The Politics of Economic Reversal. Third World Quarterly, 31(4), 623–640.
- Gertzel, C. (1984). The Dynamics of the One-Party State in Zambia. Manchester University Press.
- Gewald, J. B., Hinfelaar, M., & Macola, G. (Eds.). (2008). One Zambia, Many Histories: Towards a History of Post-Colonial Zambia. Brill.
- Ishiyama, J. (2009). Explaining ‘minor’ party nominations in Sub-Saharan Africa: The cases of Ethiopia, Zambia and Malawi. Journal of Asian and African Studies, 44(3), 319–339.
- Kim, E. K. (2017). Party Strategy in Multidimensional Competition in Africa: The Example of Zambia. Comparative Politics, 50(1), 21–39.
- Larmer, M. (2006). "A Little Bit Like A Volcano-The United Progressive Party and Resistance to One-Party Rule in Zambia, 1964-1980"A Little Bit Like A Volcano" The United Progressive Party and Resistance to One-Party Rule in Zambia, 1964-1980]. The International Journal of African Historical Studies, 39(1), 49–83.
- Larmer, M. (2011). Rethinking African Politics: A History of Opposition in Zambia. Ashgate.
- Larmer, M., & Macola, G. (2007). The Origins, Context, and Political Significance of the Mushala Rebellion Against the Zambian One-Party State. The International Journal of African Historical Studies, 40(3), 471–496.
- Larmer, M., & Alastair Fraser. (2007). Of Cabbages and King Cobra: Populist Politics and Zambia's 2006 Election. African Affairs, 106(425), 611–637.
- Lungu, G. F. (1986). The Church, Labour and the Press in Zambia: The Role of Critical Observers in a One-Party State. African Affairs, 85(340), 385–410.
- Macmillan, H. (1993). An African Trading Empire: The Story of Susman Brothers and Wulfsohn, 1901–2005. I.B. Tauris.
- Moore, D. C. (1984). The Politics of Deconstruction: A History of Political Ideas in Zambia, 1890–1984. University of Zambia Press.
- Mushingeh, C. (1993). The evolution of one-party rule in Zambia, 1964–1972. Transafrican Journal of History, 22, 100–121.
- Mushingeh, C. (1994). Unrepresentative “democracy”: One-party rule in Zambia, 1973–1990. Transafrican Journal of History, 23, 117–141.
- Nasong’o, S. W. (2007).Political Transition without Transformation: The Dialectic of Liberalization without Democratization in Kenya and Zambia. African Studies Review, 50(1), 83–107.
- Ndulo, M. B., & Kent, R. B. (1996). Constitutionalism in Zambia: Past, Present and Future. Journal of African Law, 40(2), 256–278.
- Phiri, A. I. (1973). The Current Situation in Zambia. African Affairs, 72(288), 323–325.
- Phiri, A. I. (1999). Media in "democratic" Zambia: Problems and prospects. Africa Today, 46(2), 53–65.
- Resnick, D. (2022). How Zambia's Opposition Won. Journal of Democracy 33(1), 70-84.
- Rasmussen, T. (1969). Political Competition and One-Party Dominance in Zambia. The Journal of Modern African Studies, 7(3), 407–424.
- Sardanis, A. (2014). Zambia: The First 50 Years. I.B. Tauris.
- Shaw, T. M. (1982). The Political Economy of Zambia. Current History, 81(473), 125–144.
- Shaw, T. M. (1982). Zambia after Twenty Years: Recession and Repression without Revolution. Issue: A Journal of Opinion, 12(1/2), 53–58.
- Simutanyi, N. (2006). The Politics of Structural Adjustment in Zambia. Third World Quarterly, 27(6), 991–1010.
- Southall, R. (2013). Liberation Movements in Power: Party and State in Southern Africa. James Currey.
- Southall, T. (1980). Zambia: Class Formation and Government Policy in the 1970s. Journal of Southern African Studies, 7(1), 91–108.
- Tordoff, W., & Molteno, F. (1974). Politics in Zambia. University of California Press.
- Tordoff, W., & Molteno, F. (1974). Government and Politics in Zambia. Journal of Modern African Studies, 12(1), 47–65.
- Van Donge, J. K. (1995). Zambia: Kaunda and the Second Republic. In Wiseman, J. A. (Ed.), Democracy and Political Change in Sub-Saharan Africa, 276–297. Routledge.
- van Donge, J. K. (2009). The Plundering of Zambian Resources by Frederick Chiluba and His Friends: A Case Study of the Interaction between National Politics and the International Drive towards Good Governance. African Affairs, 108(430), 69–90.
- Whitaker, B. (2023). Built on the ruins of empire: British military assistance and African independence. University Press of Kansas.

=== Foreign relations ===
- Balat, J. F., Brambilla, I., & Porto, G. G. (2007). Zambia. In B. M. Hoekman & M. Olarreaga (Eds.), Global trade and poor nations: The poverty impacts and policy implications of liberalization (pp. 97–118). Brookings Institution Press.
- Bastholm, A., & Kragelund, P. (2009). State-driven Chinese investments in Zambia: Combining strategic interests and profits. In M. P. van Dijk (Ed.), The New Presence of China in Africa (pp. 117–140). Amsterdam University Press.
- Carmody, P., & Hampwaye, G. (2010). Inclusive or Exclusive Globalization? Zambia's Economy and Asian Investment. Africa Today, 56(3), 84–102.
- Chimbelu, C. (2022). Status Complicated: In Zambia, China-Africa Is a Partnership Washington Should Not Necessarily Envy. Asia Policy, 17(3), 61–69.
- Derman, B. (2013). In the Shadow of a Conflict: Crisis in Zimbabwe and its effects in Mozambique, South Africa and Zambia. Weaver Press.
- Gadzala, Aleksandra W. From Formal to Informal Sector Employment: Examining the Chinese Presence in Zambia. Review of African Political Economy 37, no. 123 (2010): 41–59.
- Hairong, Y., & Sautman, B. (2013). “The Beginning of a World Empire”? Contesting the Discourse of Chinese Copper Mining in Zambia. Modern China, 39(2), 131–164.
- Hess, S., & Aidoo, R. (2014). Charting the roots of anti-Chinese populism in Africa: A comparison of Zambia and Ghana. 'Journal of Asian and African Studies', 49(2), 129–147.
- Kachur, D. (2021). Russia's resurgent interest in Africa: The cases of Zambia and Tanzania. South African Institute of International Affairs.
- Kenny, B., & Mather, C. (2008). Milking the region? South African capital and Zambia's dairy industry. African Sociological Review / Revue Africaine de Sociologie, 12(1), 55–66.
- Kragelund, P. (2012). Bringing “indigenous” ownership back: Chinese presence and the Citizen Economic Empowerment Commission in Zambia. The Journal of Modern African Studies, 50(3), 447–466.
- Larmer, M. (2019). Nation-making at the border: Zambian diplomacy in the Democratic Republic of Congo. Comparative Studies in Society and History, 61(1), 145–175.
- Macmillan, H. (2009). The African National Congress of South Africa in Zambia: The Culture of Exile and the Changing Relationship with Home, 1964-1990. Journal of Southern African Studies, 35(2), 303–329.
- Macmillan, H. (2013). The Lusaka years: The ANC in exile in Zambia, 1963 to 1994. Jacana Media.
- Matambo, E. (2019). Constructing China's Identity in Zambian Politics: A Tale of Expediency and Resignation. Journal of African Foreign Affairs, 6(3), 43–64.
- Negi, R. (2008). Beyond the 'Chinese Scramble': The Political Economy of Anti-China Sentiment in Zambia. African Geographical Review, 27(1), 41–59.
- Shaw, T. M. (1976). The Foreign Policy of Zambia: Ideology and Interests. The Journal of Modern African Studies, 14(1), 79–105.
- Shaw, T. M. (1976). The Foreign Policy System of Zambia. African Studies Review, 19(1), 31–66.
- Walter, W. (2004). Blurry Borders: Violent Conflict Threatens Zambia. Harvard International Review, 25(4), 10–11.

== Ethnic groups and tribes ==
- Clark, J. D. (1950). The Newly Discovered Nachikufu Culture of Northern Rhodesia and the Possible Origin of Certain Elements of the South African Smithfield Culture: Presidential Address. The South African Archaeological Bulletin, 5(19), 86–98.
- Clark, S., Colson, E., Lee, J., & Schudder, T. (1995). Ten Thousand Tonga: A Longitudinal Anthropological Study from Southern Zambia, 1956-1991. Population Studies, 49(1), 91–109.
- Cliggett, L., & Bond, V. (2013). Tonga Timeline: Appraising Sixty Years of Multidisciplinary Research in Zambia and Zimbabwe. The Lembani Trust.
- Cliggett, L. (2014). Access, Alienation, and the Production of Chronic Liminality: Sixty Years of Frontier Settlement in a Zambian Park Buffer Zone. Human Organization, 73(2), 128–140.
- Colson, E. (1986). Land Law and Land Holdings among Valley Tonga of Zambia. Journal of Anthropological Research, 42(3), 261–268.
- Cunnison, I. (1959). The Luapula peoples of Northern Rhodesia: Custom and history in tribal politics. Manchester University Press.
- Cunnison, I. (1961). Kazembe and the Portuguese 1798-1832. The Journal of African History, 2(1), 61–76.
- Dresang, D. L. (1974). Ethnic Politics, Representative Bureaucracy and Development Administration: The Zambian Case. The American Political Science Review, 68(4), 1605–1617.
- Juwayeyi, Y. M. (2020). The origins and migrations of the Chewa according to their oral traditions. In Archaeology and Oral Tradition in Malawi: Origins and Early History of the Chewa (NED-New edition, pp. 35–54). Boydell & Brewer.
- Langworthy, H. W. (1971). Conflict among rulers in the history of Undi's Chewa kingdom. Transafrican Journal of History, 1(1), 1–23.
- Macola, G. (2008). The Kingdom of Kazembe: History and Politics in North-Eastern Zambia and Katanga to 1950. Verlag.
- Kalusa, W. T. (2009). Elders, Young Men, and David Livingstone's “Civilizing Mission”: Revisiting the Disintegration of the Kololo Kingdom, 1851-1864. The International Journal of African Historical Studies, 42(1), 55–80.
- Mizinga, F. M. (2000). Marriage and Bridewealth in a Matrilineal Society: The Case of the Tonga of Southern Zambia: 1900-1996. African Economic History, 28, 53–87.
- O’Brien, D. (1983). Chiefs of Rain. Chiefs of Ruling: A Reinterpretation of Pre-Colonial Tonga (Zambia) Social and Political Structure. Africa: Journal of the International African Institute, 53(4), 23–42.
- Richards, A. I. (1939). Land, Labour and Diet in Northern Rhodesia: An Economic Study of the Bemba Tribe. Oxford University Press.
- Roberts, A. (1970). Chronology of the Bemba (N.E. Zambia). The Journal of African History, 11(2), 221–240.
- Roberts, A. D. (1973). A history of the Bemba: Political growth and change in north-eastern Zambia before 1900. University of Wisconsin Press.
- Roberts, A. D. (1973). Bemba imperialism: A history of the Bemba—political growth and change in north-eastern Zambia before 1900. African Publishing Corporation.
- van Binsbergen, W. (1992). Tears of rain: Ethnicity and history in central western Zambia. Kegan Paul International.
- Werner, D. (1971). Some Developments in Bemba Religious History. Journal of Religion in Africa, 4(1), 1–24.

== Topical works ==
=== Agriculture ===
- Chama, K.J. (2024). Cassava: The Locusts, Drought, and Famine Insurance Crop in Colonial Zambia, c. 1890–1950. African Economic History 52(2), 1-25.
- Haantuba, H. (1998). Factors affecting agricultural production in Zambia. Institute of Economic and Social Research, University of Zambia.
- Ehret, C. (1974). Agricultural history in Central and Southern Africa, ca. 1000 B.C. to A.D. 500. Transafrican Journal of History, 4(1/2), 1–25.
- Hanjra, M. A., & Culas, R. J. (2011). The political economy of maize production and poverty reduction in Zambia: Analysis of the last 50 years. Journal of Asian and African Studies, 46(6), 546–566.
- Kanduza, A. (1983). The Tobacco Industry in Northern Rhodesia, 1912-1938. The International Journal of African Historical Studies, 16(2), 201–229.
- Kanduza, A. M. (1991). History and agricultural change in Zambia. Transafrican Journal of History, 20, 97–109.
- Kenny, B., & Mather, C. (2008). Milking the region? South African capital and Zambia's dairy industry. African Sociological Review / Revue Africaine de Sociologie, 12(1), 55–66.
- Kent, R., & MacRae, M. (2010). Agricultural livelihoods and nutrition — exploring the links with women in Zambia. Gender and Development, 18(3), 387–409.
- Lay, J., Nolte, K., & Sipangule, K. (2018). Large-Scale Farms and Smallholders: Evidence from Zambia. German Institute of Global and Area Studies .
- Moore, H., & Vaughan, M. (1987). Cutting Down Trees: Women, Nutrition and Agricultural Change in the Northern Province of Zambia, 1920-1986. African Affairs, 86(345), 523–540.
- Mutonga, S. (1995). Agricultural dynamics in pre-colonial Western Zambia in the nineteenth century. Transafrican Journal of History, 24, 97–105.
- Nolte, K. (2013). Large-Scale Agricultural Investments under Poor Land Governance Systems: Actors and Institutions in the Case of Zambia. German Institute of Global and Area Studies.
- Rennie, J. K. (1978). White Farmers, Black Tenants and Landlord Legislation: Southern Rhodesia 1890-1930. Journal of Southern African Studies, 5(1), 86–98.
- Sano, H.-O. (1988). The IMF and Zambia: The Contradictions of Exchange Rate Auctioning and De-Subsidization of Agriculture. African Affairs, 87(349), 563–577.

=== Business and economics ===
- Adam, C., Collier, P., & Gondwe, M. (Eds.). (2014). Zambia: Building prosperity from resource wealth. Oxford University Press.
- Balat, J. F., Brambilla, I., & Porto, G. G. (2007). Zambia. In B. M. Hoekman & M. Olarreaga (Eds.), Global trade and poor nations: The poverty impacts and policy implications of liberalization (pp. 97–118). Brookings Institution Press.
- Beveridge, A. A., & Oberschall, A. R. (1979). African Businessmen and Development in Zambia. Princeton University Press.
- Beveridge, A. A. (1974). Economic Independence, Indigenization, and the African Businessman: Some Effects of Zambia's Economic Reforms. African Studies Review, 17(3), 477–490.
- Chipungu, S. N. (1987).[ The state, technology and peasant differentiation in Zambia: A case study of the Southern Province, 1930–1986]. University of Zambia.
- Craig, J. (2000). Evaluating Privatisation in Zambia: A Tale of Two Processes. Review of African Political Economy, 27(85), 357–366.
- Kaunda, K. (1968). Zambia's Economic Reforms. African Affairs, 67(269), 295–304.
- Katzenellenbogen, S. (1974). Zambia and Rhodesia: Prisoners of the Past: A Note on the History of Railway Politics in Central Africa. African Affairs, 73(290), 63–66.
- Miller, D., Nel, E., & Hampwaye, G. (2008). Malls in Zambia: Racialised retail expansion and South African foreign investors in Zambia. African Sociological Review / Revue Africaine de Sociologie, 12(1), 35–54.
- Mvusi, T. R. M. (1994). The “politics of trypanosomiasis” revisited: Labour mobilization and labour migration in colonial Zambia: The Robert Williams Company in Lubemba, 1901–1911. Transafrican Journal of History, 23, 43–68.
- Oberschall, A.R., & Beveridge, A.A. (2015). African Businessmen and Development in Zambia. Princeton University Press.
- Rakner, L. (2003). Political and economic liberalisation in Zambia 1991–2001. Transaction Publishers.

=== Colonialism and decolonisation ===
- Billing, M. G. (1959). Tribal Rule and Modern Politics in Northern Rhodesia. African Affairs, 58(231), 135–140.
- Good, K. (1974). Settler Colonialism in Rhodesia. African Affairs, 73(290), 10–36.
- Good, K. (1987). Zambia and the Liberation of South Africa. The Journal of Modern African Studies, 25(3), 505–540.
- Horowitz, D. (1970). Attitudes of British Conservatives towards Decolonization in Africa. African Affairs, 69(274), 9–26.
- Llewellin, Lord. (1956). Some Facts about the Federation of Rhodesia and Nyasaland. African Affairs, 55(221), 266–272.
- Macmillan, H. (2009). The African National Congress of South Africa in Zambia: The Culture of Exile and the Changing Relationship with Home, 1964-1990. Journal of Southern African Studies, 35(2), 303–329.
- Poole, E. H. L. (1931). An Early Portuguese Settlement in Northern Rhodesia. Journal of the Royal African Society, 30(119), 164–168.
- Wallace, L. A. (1922). The Beginning of Native Administration in Northern Rhodesia. Journal of the Royal African Society, 21(83), 165–176.
- Oxenham, J. (1976). Community Development and Village Employment in Zambia, 1948-62. African Affairs, 75(298), 55–66.

=== Comservation and the environment ===
- Gibson, C. C. (1995). Killing Animals with Guns and Ballots: The Political Economy of Zambian Wildlife Policy, 1972-1982. Environmental History Review, 19(1), 49–75.
- Hou-Jones, X., Franks, P., & Chung, J. (2019). Creating enabling conditions for managing trade-offs between food production and forest conservation in Africa: Case studies from Ethiopia and Zambia. International Institute for Environment and Development.
- Hou-Jones, X., Franks, P., & Chung, J. (2019). Case study: Community Markets for Conservation (COMACO), Zambia. In Creating enabling conditions for managing trade-offs between food production and forest conservation in Africa: Case studies from Ethiopia and Zambia (pp. 13–22). International Institute for Environment and Development.
- Haggblade, S. (2003). Development, diffusion, and impact of conservation farming in Zambia. Food Security Research Project.

=== Education and children ===
- Banda, D., & Morgan, W. J. (2013). Folklore as an instrument of education among the Chewa people of Zambia. International Review of Education / Internationale Zeitschrift Für Erziehungswissenschaft / Revue Internationale de l’Education, 59(2), 197–216.
- Bajaj, M. (2008). Schooling in the shadow of death: Youth agency and HIV/AIDS in Zambia. Journal of Asian and African Studies, 43(3), 307–329.
- Bond, G. C. (1982). Education and Social Stratification in Northern Zambia: The Case of the Uyombe. Anthropology & Education Quarterly, 13(3), 251–267.
- Carmody, B. P. (2002). The Politics of Catholic Education in Zambia: 1891—1964. Journal of Church and State, 44(4), 775–804.
- Carmody, B. P. (1990). Denominational Secondary Schooling in Post-Independence Zambia: A Case Study. African Affairs, 89(355), 247–263.
- Lungu, G. F. (1993). Educational Policy-Making in Colonial Zambia: The Case of Higher Education for Africans from 1924 to 1964. The Journal of Negro History, 78(4), 207–232.
- Musambachime, M. C. (1993). The University of Zambia's Institute for African Studies and Social Science Research in Central Africa, 1938-1988. History in Africa, 20, 237–248.
- Musambachime, M. (1990). The Impact of Rapid Population Growth and Economic Decline on the Quality of Education: The Case of Zambia. Review of African Political Economy, 48, 81–92.
- Mwale, N., & Njobvu, M. J. (2022). We are Still Few here: An Exploration of Women's Underrepresentation in Theological Higher Education in Zambia. In N. Mwale, L. C. Siwila, & S. Mukuka (Eds.), Chikamoneka!: Gender and Empire in Religion and Public Life (pp. 240–254). Mzuni Press.
- O’Brien, D. (1982). Party, Polity and Bureaucracy: The Zambian Education Debate, 1974-77. African Affairs, 81(323), 207–230.
- Parpart, J. L. (1994). “Where Is Your Mother?”: Gender, Urban Marriage, and Colonial Discourse on the Zambian Copperbelt, 1924-1945. The International Journal of African Historical Studies, 27(2), 241–271.
- White, S.C., & Jha, S. (2021). Moral Navigation and Child Fostering in Chiawa, Zambia. Africa: The Journal of the International African Institute 91(2), 249-269.

=== Entertainment and leisure ===
- Under construction

=== Food security ===
- Chapoto, A., Diao, X., Dorosh, P., Ellis, M., Pauw, K., Smart, J., Subakanya, M., & Thurlow, J. (2022). Zambia: Impacts of the Ukraine and Global Crises on Poverty and Food Security. International Food Policy Research Institute.
- Jickson, C. K. (2021). Food Security and State Agricultural Policies: The Long History of Cassava in Zambia from the Pre-Colonial Period to 1990. Africa: Rivista Semestrale Di Studi e Ricerche, 3(2), 53–78.
- Moore, H., & Vaughan, M. (1987). Cutting Down Trees: Women, Nutrition and Agricultural Change in the Northern Province of Zambia, 1920-1986. African Affairs, 86(345), 523–540.
- Weitz, N., Nilsson, M., Barron, J., & Mothabi, T. (2015). FOOD SECURITY IN ZAMBIA: STATUS AND TRENDS. In From global vision to country action: post-2015 development strategies and food security in Zambia (pp. 11–16). Stockholm Environment Institute.

=== Gender and sexuality ===
- Crehan, K. A. F. (1997).The fractured community: Landscapes of power and gender in rural Zambia. University of California Press.
- Elisabeth, D., Patrick, M., Phillimon, N., Bawa, Y., Staffan, B., & Anna-Berit, R.-A. (2003). “I Am Happy That God Made Me a Boy”: Zambian Adolescent Boys’ Perceptions about Growing into Manhood. African Journal of Reproductive Health / La Revue Africaine de La Santé Reproductive, 7(1), 49–62.
- Geisler, G. (1995). Troubled Sisterhood: Women and Politics in Southern Africa: Case Studies from Zambia, Zimbabwe and Botswana. African Affairs, 94(377), 545–578.
- Hansen, K.T. (1990). Body Politics: Sexuality, Gender, and Domestic Service in Zambia. Journal of Women's History, 2(1), 120-142.
- Hellweg, J. (2015). Same-Gender Desire, Religion, and Homophobia: Challenges, Complexities, and Progress for LGBTIQ Liberation in Africa. Journal of the American Academy of Religion, 83(4), 887–896.
- Hepburn, S. (2016). ‘Bringing a Girl from the Village’: Gender, Child Migration & Domestic Service in Post-colonial Zambia. In E. Razy & M. Rodet (Eds.), Children on the Move in Africa: Past and Present Experiences of Migration (NED-New edition, pp. 69–84). Boydell & Brewer.
- Hinfelaar, H. F. (1994). Bemba-Speaking Women of Zambia in a Century of Religious Change (1892–1992). Brill.
- Kaoma, K. J. (2018). Christianity, Globalization, and Protective Homophobia: Democratic Contestation of Sexuality in Sub-Saharan Africa. Palgrave Macmillan.
- Kaunda, C. J. (2023). The public Bible, politics, gender, and sexuality in Zambia. In D. F. Womack & R. C. Barreto (Eds.), Alterity and the evasion of justice: Explorations of the “Other” in world Christianity (Vol. 5, pp. 195–218). Augsburg Fortress.
- Klomegah, R. Y. (2008). Intimate Partner Violence (IPV) in Zambia: An Examination of Risk Factors and Gender Perceptions. Journal of Comparative Family Studies, 39(4), 557–569.
- Moore, H., & Vaughan, M. (1987). Cutting Down Trees: Women, Nutrition and Agricultural Change in the Northern Province of Zambia, 1920-1986. African Affairs, 86(345), 523–540.
- Parpart, J. L. (1994). “Where Is Your Mother?”: Gender, Urban Marriage, and Colonial Discourse on the Zambian Copperbelt, 1924-1945. The International Journal of African Historical Studies, 27(2), 241–271.
- Saidi, C. (2010). Women's Authority and Society in Early East-Central Africa (Vol. 44). Boydell & Brewer.
- Spichiger, R., & Kabala, E. (2014). Equality and land administration: the case of Zambia. Danish Institute for International Studies.
- van Klinken, A. S. (2020). Homosexuality, Politics, and Pentecostal Nationalism in Zambia. In R. Spronk & T. Hendriks (Eds.), Readings in Sexualities from Africa (pp. 269–282). Indiana University Press.
- van Klinken, A. S. (2015). Queer Love in a “Christian Nation”: Zambian Gay Men Negotiating Sexual and Religious Identities. Journal of the American Academy of Religion, 83(4), 947–964.
- Watch, H. R. (2013). This alien legacy: The origins of ‘sodomy’ laws in British colonialism. In C. Lennox & M. Waites (Eds.), Human Rights, Sexual Orientation and Gender Identity in The Commonwealth (pp. 83–124). University of London Press.
- Whitehead, A. (1999). “Lazy Men”, Time-Use, and Rural Development in Zambia. Gender and Development, 7(3), 49–61.

=== Health ===
- Bajaj, M. (2008). Schooling in the shadow of death: Youth agency and HIV/AIDS in Zambia. Journal of Asian and African Studies, 43(3), 307–329.
- Cross, S.S., & Baernholdt, D.M. (2017). Identifying Factors for Worker Motivation in Zambia's Rural Health Facilities. Journal of Health Care for the Poor and Underserved, 28(1), 63-70.
- Hunleth, J. (2017). Children as Caregivers: The Global Fight against Tuberculosis and HIV in Zambia. Rutgers University Press.
- Frank, E. (2009). Shifting Paradigms and the Politics of AIDS in Zambia. African Studies Review, 52(3), 33-53.
- Saasa, S., & James, S. (2020). COVID-19 in Zambia: Implications for Family, Social, Economic, and Psychological Well-Being. Journal of Comparative Family Studies, 51(3/4), 347–359.
- Sugishita, K. (2009). Traditional Medicine, Biomedicine and Christianity in Modern Zambia. Africa: Journal of the International African Institute, 79(3), 435–454.

=== Human rights ===
- Bartlett, D. (2001). Human Rights, Democracy & the Donors: The First MMD Government in Zambia. Review of African Political Economy, 28(87), 83–91.
- Gallagher, J. D. (2002). Zambia's Parliament and the Promotion of Human Rights. Africa Today, 49(1), 55–70.
- Hellweg, J. (2015). Same-Gender Desire, Religion, and Homophobia: Challenges, Complexities, and Progress for LGBTIQ Liberation in Africa. Journal of the American Academy of Religion, 83(4), 887–896.
- Kirk, T. (1975). Politics and Violence in Rhodesia. African Affairs, 74(294), 3–38.
- Melvin L. M. Mbao. (1998). Human Rights and Discrimination: Zambia's Constitutional Amendment, 1996. Journal of African Law, 42(1), 1–11.
- Musambachime, M. C. (1989). Escape from tyranny: Flights across the Rhodesia-Congo boundary, 1900–1930. Transafrican Journal of History, 18, 147–159.

=== Journalism and media ===
- Armour, C. (1984). The BBC and the Development of Broadcasting in British Colonial Africa 1946-1956. African Affairs, 83(332), 359–402.
- Gondwe, G. (2022). How Does the Zambian Media Report China? Examining Episodic and Thematic Frames in the Zambian Newsrooms. Journal of Asian and African Studies, 59(5), 1556-1570.

=== Labor ===
- Berger, E. L. (1972). Government policy towards migrant labour on the Copperbelt, 1930–1945. Transafrican Journal of History, 2(1), 83–102.
- Haller, T., & Merten, S. (2008). “We Are Zambians—Don't Tell Us How to Fish!” Institutional Change, Power Relations and Conflicts in the Kafue Flats Fisheries in Zambia. Human Ecology, 36(5), 699–715.
- Hansen, K.T. (2018). Distant Companions: Servants and Employers in Zambia, 1900–1985. Cornell University Press.
- Hepburn, S. (2019). Service and Solidarity: Domestic Workers, Informal Organising and the Limits of Unionisation in Zambia. Journal of Southern African Studies, 45(1), 31–47.
- Madimutsa, C. (2022). Industrial relations, social dialogue and pacification of public sector unions in Zambia: Rethinking trade union strategies. Journal of Asian and African Studies, 58(8), 1528–1544.
- Mvusi, T. R. M. (1994). The “politics of trypanosomiasis” revisited: Labour mobilization and labour migration in colonial Zambia: The Robert Williams Company in Lubemba, 1901–1911. Transafrican Journal of History, 23, 43–68.
- Oxenham, J. (1976). Community Development and Village Employment in Zambia, 1948-62. African Affairs, 75(298), 55–66.
- Reginald J. B. Moore. (1939). Labour Conditions in Northern Rhodesia. Journal of the Royal African Society, 38(153), 438–441.
- Singh, R. J. (1984). Trade Union Development in Zambia. Présence Africaine, 131, 15–23.
- Welensky, R. (1946). Africans and Trade Unions in Northern Rhodesia. African Affairs, 45(181), 185–191.
- Prain, R. L. (1956). The Stabilization of Labour in the Rhodesian Copper Belt. African Affairs, 55(221), 305–312.

=== Legal and judicial ===
- Epstein, A. L. (1953). The administration of justice and the urban African: A study of urban native courts in Northern Rhodesia. Rhodes-Livingstone Institute.
- Hatchard, J. (1985). Crime and Penal Policy in Zambia. The Journal of Modern African Studies, 23(3), 483–505.
- Killingray, D. (1986). The Maintenance of Law and Order in British Colonial Africa. African Affairs, 85(340), 411–437.
- Klomegah, R. Y. (2008). Intimate Partner Violence (IPV) in Zambia: An Examination of Risk Factors and Gender Perceptions. Journal of Comparative Family Studies, 39(4), 557–569.
- Mbao, M. (2011). Prevention and combating of corruption in Zambia. The Comparative and International Law Journal of Southern Africa, 44(2), 255–274.
- Ndulo, M. B., & Kent, R. B. (1996). Constitutionalism in Zambia: Past, Present and Future. Journal of African Law, 40(2), 256–278.
- The Death Sentence in Zambia and International Human Rights. (1997). Journal of African Law, 41(1), 147–148.

=== Linguistics and language ===
- Posner, Daniel N. (2003). The Colonial Origins of Ethnic Cleavages: The Case of Linguistic Divisions in Zambia. Comparative Politics. 35 (2): 127–146.

=== Literature ===
- Primorac, R. (2022). Zambia and the Drift of World Literature. Research in African Literatures, 53(3), 104-117.

=== Military ===
- Lindemann, S. (2011). The Ethnic Politics of Coup Avoidance: Evidence from Zambia and Uganda. Africa Spectrum, 46(2), 3–41.
- Walter, W. (2004). Blurry Borders: Violent Conflict Threatens Zambia. Harvard International Review, 25(4), 10–11.

=== Mining and industry ===
- Alford, B. W. E., & Harvey, C. E. (1980). Copperbelt Merger: The Formation of the Rhokana Corporation, 1930-1932. The Business History Review, 54(3), 330–358.
- Butler, L. J. (2007). Copper Empire: Mining and the Colonial State in Northern Rhodesia, c. 1930–64. Palgrave Macmillan.
- Coleman, F. L. (1971). The Northern Rhodesia Copperbelt, 1899–1962: Technological Development Up to the End of the Central African Federation. Manchester University Press.
- Craig, J. (2001). Putting Privatisation into Practice: The Case of Zambia Consolidated Copper Mines. The Journal of Modern African Studies, 39(3), 389–410.
- Ferguson, J. (1999). Expectations of modernity: Myths and meanings of urban life on the Zambian Copperbelt. University of California Press.
- Fraser, A., & Larmer, M. (2010). Zambia, mining, and neoliberalism: Boom and bust on the globalized Copperbelt. Palgrave Macmillan.
- Hairong, Y., & Sautman, B. (2013). “The Beginning of a World Empire”? Contesting the Discourse of Chinese Copper Mining in Zambia. Modern China, 39(2), 131–164.
- Haruyama, J.L. (2023). Shortcut English: Pidgin Language, Racialization, and Symbolic Economies at a Chinese-Operated Mine in Zambia. African Studies Review 66(1), 18-44.
- Haynes, N. (2017). Moving by the Spirit: Pentecostal Social Life on the Zambian Copperbelt. University of California Press.
- Henderson, I. (1975). Early African Leadership: The Copperbelt Disturbances of 1935 and 1940. Journal of Southern African Studies, 2(1), 83–97.
- Henderson, I. (1973). Wage-Earners and Political Protest in Colonial Africa: The Case of the Copperbelt. African Affairs, 72(288), 288–299.
- Kanduza, J. M. (1985). An imperial dilemma: Copper refining in Northern Rhodesia, 1929–1935. Transafrican Journal of History, 14, 46–62.
- Larmer, M. (2016). Mineworkers in Zambia: Labour and political change in post-colonial Africa. I.B. Tauris.
- Larmer, M., Guene, E., & Henriet, B. (Eds.). (2021). Across the Copperbelt: Urban & Social Change in Central Africa's Borderland Communities. Boydell & Brewer.
- Larmer, M. (2021). Living for the City: Social Change and Knowledge Production in the Central African Copperbelt. Cambridge University Press.
- Macmillan, H. (1993). An African Trading Empire: The Story of Susman Brothers and Wulfsohn, 1901–2005. I.B. Tauris.
- Miller, D. E., & Van Der Merwe, N. J. (1994). Early Metal Working in Sub-Saharan Africa: A Review of Recent Research. The Journal of African History, 35(1), 1–36.
- Money, D. (2019). ‘Aliens’ on the Copperbelt: Zambianisation, nationalism and non-Zambian Africans in the mining industry. Journal of Southern African Studies, 45(5), 859–875.
- Mususa, P. (2021). There Used to Be Order: Life on the Copperbelt after the Privatisation of the Zambia Consolidated Copper Mines. University of Michigan Press.
- Ndulo, M. (1977). The requirement of domestic participation in new mining ventures in Zambia. The Comparative and International Law Journal of Southern Africa, 10(3), 257–280.
- O’Faircheallaigh, C. (1986). Mineral Taxation, Mineral Revenues and Mine Investment in Zambia, 1964-83. The American Journal of Economics and Sociology, 45(1), 53–67.
- Parpart, J. L. (1983). Labor and Capital on the African Copperbelt. Temple University Press.
- Parpart, J. L. (1994). “Where Is Your Mother?”: Gender, Urban Marriage, and Colonial Discourse on the Zambian Copperbelt, 1924-1945. The International Journal of African Historical Studies, 27(2), 241–271.
- Parsons, E. C. (2010). What Price for Privatization? Cultural Encounter with Development Policy on the Zambian Copperbelt. Lexington Books.
- Pesa, I. (2019). Living for the City: Social Change and Knowledge Production in the Central African Copperbelt. Cambridge University Press.
- Pesa, I. (2022). "The Copperbelt of Zambia and the Democratic Republic of Congo." In Oxford Research Encyclopedia of African History. Oxford University Press.
- Potts, D. (2005). Counter-urbanisation on the Zambian Copperbelt? Interpretations and Implications. Urban Studies, 42(4), 583–609.
- Prain, R. L. (1956). The Stabilization of Labour in the Rhodesian Copper Belt. African Affairs, 55(221), 305–312.
- Rubbers, B. (Ed.). (2021). Inside Mining Capitalism: The Micropolitics of Work on the Congolese and Zambian Copperbelts. Boydell & Brewer.
- Steinberg, J. (2019). "Two Countries, One Firm: Mining the Copperbelt in Zambia and DRC." In Mines, Communities, and States: The Local Politics of Natural Resource Extraction in Africa. Cambridge University Press.

=== Nationalism ===
- Henderson, I. (1970). The Origins of Nationalism in East and Central Africa: The Zambian Case. The Journal of African History, 11(4), 591–603.
- Kashimani, E. M. (1995). Zambia: The disintegration of the nationalist coalitions in UNIP and the imposition of a one-party state, 1964–1972. Transafrican Journal of History, 24, 23–69.
- Kashoki, E. (2018). Nation Building in the Context of 'One Zambia One Nation'. Gadsden Publishers.
- Money, D. (2019). ‘Aliens’ on the Copperbelt: Zambianisation, nationalism and non-Zambian Africans in the mining industry. Journal of Southern African Studies, 45(5), 859–875.
- Musambachime, M. C. (1991). Dauti Yamba's Contribution to the Rise and Growth of Nationalism in Zambia, 1941-1964. African Affairs, 90(359), 259–281.
- Pettman, J. (1974). Zambia: Security and conflict. St. Martin's Press.

=== Religion, beliefs, and traditions ===
- Carmody, B. (2002). The Politics of Catholic Education in Zambia: 1891—1964. Journal of Church and State, 44(4), 775–804.
- Dillon-Malone, C. (1983). The “Mutumwa” Churches of Zambia: An Indigenous African Religious Healing Movement. Journal of Religion in Africa, 14(3), 204–222.
- Frey, L. (2020). History of the Zambia Baptist Association 1905-2005. Luviri Press.
- Gordon, D. M. (2004). The Cultural Politics of a Traditional Ceremony: Mutomboko and the Performance of History on the Luapula (Zambia). Comparative Studies in Society and History, 46(1), 63–83.
- Gordon, D. M. (2004). The Cultural Politics of a Traditional Ceremony: Mutomboko and the Performance of History on the Luapula (Zambia). Comparative Studies in Society and History, 46(1), 63–83.
- Haar, G. ter, & Ellis, S. (1988). Spirit Possession and Healing in Modern Zambia: An Analysis of Letters to Archbishop Milingo. African Affairs, 87(347), 185–206.
- Haynes, N. (2017). Moving by the Spirit: Pentecostal Social Life on the Zambian Copperbelt. University of California Press.
- Haynes, N. (2021). Concretizing the Christian Nation: Negotiating Zambia's National House of Prayer. Comparative Studies of South Asia Africa and the Middle East, 41(2), 166-174.
- Hinfelaar, H. F. (1994). Bemba-Speaking Women of Zambia in a Century of Religious Change (1892–1992). Brill.
- Hudson, J. (1999). Hudson: A Time to Mourn: A Personal Account of the 1964 Lumpa Church Revolt in Zambia. Gadsden Publishers.
- Kaoma, K. J. (2018). Christianity, Globalization, and Protective Homophobia: Democratic Contestation of Sexuality in Sub-Saharan Africa. Palgrave Macmillan.
- Kaunda, C. J. (2018). The nation that fears God prospers: A critique of Zambian Pentecostal theopolitical imaginations. Augsburg Fortress.
- Kaunda, C.J., & Hinfelaar, M. (2020). Competing for Caesar: Religion and Politics in Post-colonial Zambia. Augsburg Fortress Publishers.
- Longwe, H. (2021). Zimbabwe, Zambia and Malawi. In Setting the Record Straight: Essays on Ecclesiology, Missiology and Evangelism (pp. 243–260). Luviri Press.
- Lungu, G. F. (1986). The Church, Labour and the Press in Zambia: The Role of Critical Observers in a One-Party State. African Affairs, 85(340), 385–410.
- Musambachime, M. C. (1988). The Impact of Rumor: The Case of the Banyama (Vampire Men) Scare in Northern Rhodesia, 1930-1964. The International Journal of African Historical Studies, 21(2), 201–215.
- O’Brien, D., & O’Brien, C. (1997). The Monze Rain Festival: The History of Change in a Religious Cult in Zambia. The International Journal of African Historical Studies, 29(3), 519–541.
- Phiri, I. A. (2003). President Frederick J. T. Chiluba of Zambia: The Christian Nation and Democracy. Journal of Religion in Africa, 33(4), 401–428.
- Poewe, K. O. (1989). Religion, Kinship, and Economy in Luapula, Zambia. Edwin Mellen Press.
- Primorac, R. (2012). Legends of Modern Zambia. Research in African Literatures 43(4), 50-70.
- Richards, A. I. (1956). Chisungu: A Girl's Initiation Ceremony among the Bemba of Northern Rhodesia. Faber & Faber.
- Roberts, A. (1972). The Lumpa Church of Alice Lenshina. Oxford University Press. (Note: See Alice Lenshina for additional information.)
- Rotberg, R. I. (1965). Christian missionaries and the creation of Northern Rhodesia 1880–1924: A study in the history of Christianity and politics. Princeton University Press.
- Sakupapa, Teddy Chalwe. "Christianity in Zambia." In Anthology of African Christianity, edited by Isabel Apawo Phiri, Dietrich Werner, Chammah Kaunda, Kennedy Owino, Edison Kalengyo, Priscille Djomhue, Kudzai Biri, Kwabena Asamoah-Gyadu, James Amanze, and Roderick Hewitt, 758–65. Augsburg Fortress, 2016.
- Sugishita, K. (2009). Traditional Medicine, Biomedicine and Christianity in Modern Zambia. Africa: Journal of the International African Institute, 79(3), 435–454.
- Turner, V. W. (1968). Drums of Affliction: A Study of Religious Processes Among the Ndembu of Zambia. Clarendon Press.
- Werner, D. (1971). Some Developments in Bemba Religious History. Journal of Religion in Africa, 4(1), 1–24.
- Werner, D. (1971). Some Developments in Bemba Religious History. Journal of Religion in Africa, 4(1), 1–24.
- White, L. (1993). Vampire Priests of Central Africa: African Debates about Labor and Religion in Colonial Northern Zambia. Comparative Studies in Society and History, 35(4), 746–772.

=== Slavery and forced labor ===
- Gordon, D. M. (2009). The Abolition of the Slave Trade and the Transformation of the South-Central African Interior during the Nineteenth Century. The William and Mary Quarterly, 66(4), 915–938.

=== Rural life ===
- Bratton, M. (1980). The local politics of rural development: Peasant and party-state in Zambia. University Press of New England.
- Cliggett, L. (2014). Access, Alienation, and the Production of Chronic Liminality: Sixty Years of Frontier Settlement in a Zambian Park Buffer Zone. Human Organization, 73(2), 128–140.
- Crehan, K. A. F. (1997).The fractured community: Landscapes of power and gender in rural Zambia. University of California Press.
- Dodge, D. J. (1977). Agricultural policy and performance in Zambia: History, prospects, and proposals for change. Institute of International Studies, University of California.
- Kay, G. (1968). A Regional Framework for Rural Development in Zambia. African Affairs, 67(266), 29–43.
- Moore, H. L., & Vaughan, M. (1994). Cutting down trees: Gender, nutrition, and agricultural change in the Northern Province of Zambia, 1890–1990. Heinemann; University of Zambia Press.
- Palmer, R. (1990). Land Reform in Zimbabwe, 1980-1990. African Affairs, 89(355), 163–181.
- Palmer, R., & Parsons, N. (Eds.). (1977). The roots of rural poverty in Central and Southern Africa. University of California Press.
- Pollak, O. B. (1975). Black Farmers and White Politics in Rhodesia. African Affairs, 74(296), 263–277.
- Rennie, J. K. (1978). White Farmers, Black Tenants and Landlord Legislation: Southern Rhodesia 1890-1930. Journal of Southern African Studies, 5(1), 86–98.
- Siddle, D. J. (1970). Rural Development in Zambia: A Spatial Analysis. The Journal of Modern African Studies, 8(2), 271–284.
- Whitehead, A. (1999). “Lazy Men”, Time-Use, and Rural Development in Zambia. Gender and Development, 7(3), 49–61.

=== Urban life ===
- Allen, R. (1981). Reassessing African Political Activity in Urban Northern Rhodesia. African Affairs, 80(319), 239–258.
- Hansen, K. T. (1997). Keeping House in Lusaka. Columbia University Press.
- Heisler, H. (1971). The Creation of a Stabilized Urban Society: A Turning Point in the Development of Northern Rhodesia/Zambia. African Affairs, 70(279), 125–145.
- Oxenham, J. (1976). Community Development and Village Employment in Zambia, 1948-62. African Affairs, 75(298), 55–66.
- Primorac, R. (2013). At home in the world in postcolonial Lusaka Review of Patchwork; Chikwakwa Remembered: Theatre and Politics in Zambia 1968–1972; A Sort of Life in Journalism, by E. Banda-Aaku, M. Etherton, J. Reed, & B. Saidi. Journal of Southern African Studies, 39(2), 481–484.
- Potts, D. (2005). Counter-urbanisation on the Zambian Copperbelt? Interpretations and Implications. Urban Studies, 42(4), 583–609.
- Sapire, H., & Beall, J. (1995). Introduction: Urban Change and Urban Studies in Southern Africa. Journal of Southern African Studies, 21(1), 3–17.
- Scott, I. (1978). Middle Class Politics in Zambia. African Affairs, 77(308), 321–334.
- Silavwe, G. W. (1994). Effects of rural-urban migration on urban housing in Zambia. Ekistics, 61(366/367), 240–246.

== Miscellaneous ==
- Chanda, O. (2020). The Living Heritage of Traditional Names in Zambia. Central European University.
- Hansen, K. T. (2000). Salaula: The world of secondhand clothing and Zambia. University of Chicago Press.
- Kanduza, A. M. (1990). Towards a history of ideas in Zambia. Transafrican Journal of History, 19, 24–42.
- Katzenellenbogen, S. (1974). Zambia and Rhodesia: Prisoners of the Past: A Note on the History of Railway Politics in Central Africa. African Affairs, 73(290), 63–66.
- Moore, D. C. (1984). The Politics of Deconstruction: A History of Political Ideas in Zambia, 1890–1984. University of Zambia Press.
- Mudenda, G. N. (1983). Class Formation and Class Struggle in Contemporary Zambia. Contemporary Marxism, 6, 95–118.
- Musambachime, M. C. (1994). The Ubutwa Society in Eastern Shaba and Northeast Zambia to 1920. The International Journal of African Historical Studies, 27(1), 77–99.
- Roberts, A. D. (1971). Firearms in north-eastern Zambia before 1900. Transafrican Journal of History, 1(2), 3–21.
- Smyth, R. (1984). War Propaganda during the Second World War in Northern Rhodesia. African Affairs, 83(332), 345–358.
- Tordoff, W. (1977). Zambia: The Politics of Disengagement. African Affairs, 76(302), 60–69.

== Biographies ==
- Haar, G. ter. (1992). Spirit of Africa: The Healing Ministry of Archbishop Milingo of Zambia. Hurst.
- Macola, G. (2010). Liberal Nationalism in Central Africa: A Biography of Harry Mwaanga Nkumbula. Palgrave Macmillan.
- MacPherson, F. (1974). Kenneth Kaunda of Zambia: The Times and the Man. Oxford University Press.
- Malupenga, A. (2011). Levy Patrick Mwanawasa: An Incentive for Posterity. Gadsden Publishers.
- Melady, T. P. (1964). Kenneth Kaunda of Zambia: The Times and the Man. Praeger.
- Milford, I. (2022). Just an African radical?: A Zambian at the edge of the Third World. In L. Almagor, H. A. Ikonomou, & G. Simonsen (Eds.), Global biographies: Lived history as method (pp. 105–123). Manchester University Press.
- Mukwita, A. (2017). Against All Odds: Zambia's President Edgar Chagwa Lungu's Rough Journey to State House. Partridge Africa.
- Mwangilwa, G. B. (1983). Harry Mwaanga Nkumbula: A Biography of the Old Lion of Zambia. Multimedia Publications.
- Mwangilwa, G. B., & Kapwepwe, S. M. (1986). The Kapwepwe Diaries. Multimedia Publications.
- Ntomba, R. (2021). Michael Sata: Portrait of a Populist. Gadsden.
- Palmer, R. (2008). A House in Zambia. Recollections of the ANC and Oxfam at 250 Zambezi Road, Lusaka, 1967-97: Recollections of the ANC and Oxfam at 250 Zambezi Road, Lusaka, 1967-97. Gadsden Publishers.
- Phiri, I. A. (2003). President Frederick J. T. Chiluba of Zambia: The Christian Nation and Democracy. Journal of Religion in Africa, 33(4), 401–428.
- Roberts, A. (1972). The Lumpa Church of Alice Lenshina. Oxford University Press. (Note: See Alice Lenshina for additional information.)
- Van Donge, J. K. (1985). An Episode from the Independence Struggle in Zambia: A Case Study from Mwase Lundazi. African Affairs, 84(335), 265–277.

== Books with significant material about Zambian history ==
- Barham, L. S., & Mitchell, P. J. (2008). The First Africans: African archaeology from the earliest toolmakers to most recent foragers. Cambridge University Press.
- Denbow, J. (2014). The archaeology and ethnography of Central Africa. Cambridge University Press.
- Gordon, D. M. (2012). Invisible agents: Spirits in a Central African history. Ohio University Press.
- Ranger, T., & Kimambo, I. N. (Eds.). (1972). The historical study of African religion. University of California Press.
- Resnick, D. (2014). Urban Poverty and Party Populism in African Democracies. Cambridge University Press.
- Roberts, A. (1986). The colonial moment in Africa: Essays on the movement of minds and materials. Cambridge University Press.
- Schumaker, L. (2001). Africanizing Anthropology: Fieldwork, Networks, and the Making of Cultural Knowledge in Central Africa. Duke University Press.
- Tindall, P. E. N. (1968). A history of Central Africa. Longman.
- Whitaker, B. (2023). Built on the Ruins of Empire: British Military Assistance and African Independence. University Press of Kansas.

== Historiography and bibliographies ==
- Etherington, N. (1996). Recent trends in the historiography of Christianity in Southern Africa. Journal of Southern African Studies, 22(2), 201–219.
- Ferguson, J. (1990). Mobile Workers, Modernist Narratives: A Critique of the Historiography of Transition on the Zambian Copperbelt (Part One). Journal of Southern African Studies, 16(3), 385–412.
- Ferguson, J. (1990). Mobile Workers, Modernist Narratives: A Critique of the Historiography of Transition on the Zambian Copperbelt (Part Two). Journal of Southern African Studies, 16(4), 603–621.
- Gewald, J. B. (2008). Researching post-colonial Zambia: Prospects and problems. In J.-B. Gewald, M. Hinfelaar, & G. Macola (Eds.), One Zambia, Many Histories: Towards a History of Post-colonial Zambia (pp. 29–50). Brill.
- Hinfelaar, M. (2008). Historiography and the state: The case of Zambia. In J. B. Gewald, M. Hinfelaar, & G. Macola (Eds.), One Zambia, Many Histories: Towards a History of Post-colonial Zambia (pp. 51–74). Brill.
- Kalusa, W. T., & Phiri, B. J. (2013). Introduction: Zambia's postcolonial historiography. Zambia Social Science Journal, 2(1), 1–14.
- Macmillan, H. (1993). The historiography of transition on the Zambian Copperbelt: Another view. Journal of Southern African Studies, 19(4), 681–712.
- Macmillan, H. (1996). More Thoughts on the Historiography of Transition on the Zambian Copperbelt. Journal of Southern African Studies, 22(2), 309–312.
- Macola, G. (2008). Introduction: A historiography of post-colonial Zambia. In J. B. Gewald, M. Hinfelaar, & G. Macola (Eds.), One Zambia, Many Histories: Towards a History of Post-colonial Zambia (pp. 1–28). Brill.

=== Bibliographies ===
- National Archives of Zambia. (1978). The national bibliography of Zambia.
- Kay, S., & Nystrom, B. (1971). Education and Colonialism in Africa: An Annotated Bibliography. Comparative Education Review, 15(2), 240–259.

=== Primary sources ===
- Bond, M. (2014). From Northern Rhodesia to Zambia. Recollections of a DO/DC 1962-73: Recollections of a DO/DC 1962-73. Gadsden Publishers.
- Brelsford, W. V. (1965). Tribes of Zambia. Government Printer.
- Government of Northern Rhodesia. (1950–1965). The Northern Rhodesia journal (Vols. 1–6). Government Printer.
- Graham, I. M., & Halwindi, B. C. (n.d.). Guide to the Public Archives of Zambia: I, 1895–1940. National Archives of Zambia.
- Haig, J.M. (2007). From Kings Cross to Kew: Following the History of Zambia's Indian Community through British Imperial Archives. History in Africa, 34, 55-66.
- Hudson, J. (1999). Hudson: A Time to Mourn: A Personal Account of the 1964 Lumpa Church Revolt in Zambia. Gadsden Publishers.
- Kaunda, K. (1962). Zambia shall be free: An autobiography. Heinemann.
- Macpherson, F. (1981). The Presbyterian Church in Zambia: Synod of Zambia, 1924–1984. Synod of Zambia.
- Money, D. (2021). Rebalancing the Historical Narrative or Perpetuating Bias? Digitizing the Archives of the Mineworkers' Union of Zambia. History in Africa, 48, 61-82.
- Musambachime, M. C. (1991). The Archives of Zambia's United National Independence Party. History in Africa, 18, 291–296.
- Palmer, R. (2008). A House in Zambia. Recollections of the ANC and Oxfam at 250 Zambezi Road, Lusaka, 1967-97: Recollections of the ANC and Oxfam at 250 Zambezi Road, Lusaka, 1967-97. Gadsden Publishers.
- Pirie, G. (1906). North-Eastern Rhodesia Its People and Products. Part I. Journal of the Royal African Society, 5(18), 130–147.
- Pirie, G. (1906). North-Eastern Rhodesia: Its People and Products. Part II. Journal of the Royal African Society, 5(19), 300–310.
- Pirie, G. (1906). North-Eastern Rhodesia. Part III. Native Customs. “Kutola” (The Etiquette to Be Observed on Visiting a Chief). Journal of the Royal African Society, 5(20), 432–436.
- Pirie, G. (1906). North-Eastern Rhodesia: Part IV. Journal of the Royal African Society, 6(21), 43–58.

== Reference works ==
- History of Zambia. Encyclopædia Britannica.
- McEvedy, C. (1995). The Penguin atlas of African history. Penguin Books.
- Pesa, I. (2022). "The Copperbelt of Zambia and the Democratic Republic of Congo." In Oxford Research Encyclopedia of African History. Oxford University Press.
- Nyamunda, T. (2017). ‘More a Cause than a Country’: Historiography, UDI and the Crisis of Decolonisation in Rhodesia'More a Cause than a Country': Historiography, UDI and the Crisis of Decolonisation in Rhodesia]. Journal of Southern African Studies, 43(1), 145–157.
- Africa Bibliography. (2008). Africa: Journal of the International African Institute.

== Libraries ==
- Cheelo, L. Z. (1972). The Zambia Library Association: Past History, Present and Future Development. The Journal of Library History (1966-1972), 7(4), 316–328.
- University of Zambia Library – The main academic library system for UNZA, supporting research and teaching across multiple campuses. The Institute for African Studies Library is a specialized research library housing materials on African studies, development, and policy.
- Lubuto Library Partners – A network of public libraries focused on education and community development, especially for vulnerable children.
- Lusaka City Libraries – A public library network operated by Lusaka City Council with branches in several neighborhoods.
- British Council Digital Library Zambia – An online digital library offering books, audiobooks, research resources, and learning tools.
- Copperbelt University Library – The primary academic library for CBU, providing support for STEM, business, and social sciences.
- Mulungushi University Library – Supports students and researchers at Mulungushi University with both print and electronic resources.
- Cavendish University Zambia Library – Academic library for Cavendish students, offering access to journals, e-resources, and texts.
- Kwame Nkrumah University Library – Provides educational and research support to one of Zambia's leading institutions for teacher education.
- Mukuba University Library – Academic library specializing in education and science resources for students and faculty.
- National Archives of Zambia – Zambia's official archive, holding public records and a significant legal deposit collection.
- Kitwe Public Library – A municipal library serving the community with books, periodicals, and a children's section.

== Academic journals ==
- The Journal of African History. (1960–present). Cambridge University Press.
- African Studies Review. (1970–present). Cambridge University Press on behalf of the African Studies Association.
- The International Journal of African Historical Studies. (1972–present). Boston University African Studies Center.
- Journal of Southern African Studies. (1974–present). Taylor & Francis.
- Journal of Religion in Africa. (1967–present). Brill Publishers.
- History in Africa. (1974–present). Cambridge University Press for the African Studies Association.
- African Economic History. (1974–present). University of Wisconsin Press.
- Africa: Journal of the International African Institute. (1928–present). Cambridge University Press for the International African Institute.
- The African Archaeological Review. (1983–present). Springer.
- The Journal of Modern African Studies. (1963–present). Cambridge University Press.
- Transafrican Journal of History. (1971–1996). East African Educational Publishers.
- African Sociological Review. (1997–present). CODESRIA.
- Canadian Journal of African Studies. (1967–present). Canadian Association of African Studies / Taylor & Francis.
- Journal of African Union Studies. (2012–present). Adonis & Abbey Publishers.
- Zambia Journal of History. (1984–present). University of Zambia, Department of Historical and Archaeological Studies.

== See also ==
- History of Zambia
- Monuments and Historic Sites of Zambia
- List of museums in Zambia
- Outline of the history of Zambia
- Timeline of Zambia (Northern Rhodesia)
- Scramble for Africa
