= Michael Roberts (writer) =

English schoolteacher (1902–1948)

Michael Roberts (6 December 1902 – 13 December 1948), originally named William Edward Roberts, was an English poet, writer, scientist, mathematician, critic and broadcaster, a polymath who made his living as a teacher.

== Life ==
He was born in Bournemouth, named William Edward Roberts. He was the eldest child of Edward George Roberts and Henrietta Mary Sellers. He was educated at Bournemouth School. From 1920 to 1922 he studied at King's College London, taking a BSc in Chemistry. From 1922 to 1925 he read mathematics at Trinity College, Cambridge; it was during this period of his life he acquired the name Michael (after Mikhail Lomonosov). In 1925 or 1926 he joined the Communist Party of Great Britain but was expelled within a year. According to Philip Spratt, who was one of only a handful of fellow communists attending Cambridge at this time, Roberts was suspected by the Marxist academic Maurice Dobb of being a fascist spy.

From 1925 to 1931 he taught at the Royal Grammar School, Newcastle. Then he moved to London, teaching at Mercers' School from 1931 to 1934. He then returned to the RGS, where he worked until 1941, teaching English, mathematics, physics and chemistry. Having published his first poetry collection in 1930, he began to edit anthologies, of which New Country (1933) was celebrated for the group of poets (including W. H. Auden) that it featured. In 1934, he participated in a series of radio broadcasts, Whither Britain? along with Winston Churchill, George Bernard Shaw and Ernest Bevin.

The next year, he married Janet Adam Smith, critic, anthologist, and fellow mountaineer; they lived in Fern Avenue, Jesmond, Newcastle upon Tyne. In 1939 they went to Penrith in Cumberland when the school was evacuated there. There they briefly shared a house with the poet Kathleen Raine.

Together, they had four children: Andrew Roberts, Professor of the History of Africa at the University of London, born 1937; Henrietta Dombey, Professor of Literacy in Primary Education at the University of Brighton, born 1939; Adam Roberts, Professor of International Relations at Oxford University, born 1940; and John Roberts, writer on energy issues and Middle East politics, born 1947.

The Faber Book of Modern Verse (1936), which he edited, is the piece of work for which Roberts is now best remembered. The Oxford Companion to Twentieth-Century Literature in English states that Roberts' The Faber Book of Modern Verse was "directly instrumental in forming the tastes of succeeding generations of readers." He followed it with poetry and prose writing, and a study of T. E. Hulme. In 1941–45 he worked in London for the BBC European Service, mainly on broadcasting to German-occupied countries. From 1945 to 1948 he was Principal of the College of St Mark and St John in Chelsea, London. He died of leukaemia in 1948. Roberts' posthumously published book The Estate of Man (1951) was an early analysis of ecological issues.

Michael and Janet Roberts had built up a collection of books on mountaineering, which (along with the collection of the Oxford University Mountaineering Club) provided a basis for establishment in December 1992 of the Oxford Mountaineering Library. This is now based in the Social Science Library in the Manor Road Building, Oxford, OX1 3UQ.

Many of his papers are in the National Library of Scotland, at Edinburgh. They include literary correspondence and records of his BBC work in 1941–45.

== Poets in New Signatures (1932) ==
W. H. Auden, Julian Bell, C. Day-Lewis, Richard Eberhart, William Empson, John Lehmann, William Plomer, Stephen Spender, A. S. J. Tessimond.

== Poets in New Country (1933) ==
W. H. Auden, Richard Goodman, C. Day-Lewis, John Lehmann, Charles Madge, Michael Roberts, Stephen Spender, A. S. J. Tessimond, Rex Warner.

== Books by Michael Roberts ==
- These Our Matins (poems), Elkin Mathews & Marrot, London, 1930.
- (ed.) New Signatures: Poems by Several Hands, Hogarth Press, London, 1932.
- (ed.) New Country: Prose and Poetry by the authors of New Signatures, Hogarth Press, London, 1933.
- (ed.) Elizabethan Prose, London, Jonathan Cape, 1933.
- (with E.R. Thomas) Newton and the Origin of Colours: A Study of One of the Earliest Examples of Scientific Method, G. Bell, London, 1934.
- Critique of Poetry, Jonathan Cape, London, 1934.
- Poems, Jonathan Cape, London, 1936.
- (ed.) The Faber Book of Modern Verse, Faber & Faber, London, 1936.
- The Modern Mind, Faber & Faber, London, 1937.
- T.E. Hulme, Faber & Faber, London, 1938.
- Orion Marches (poems), Faber & Faber, London, 1939.
- The Recovery of the West, Faber & Faber, London, 1941.
- (ed.) The Faber Book of Comic Verse, Faber & Faber, London, 1942.
- The Estate of Man, Faber & Faber, London, 1951.
- Collected Poems, Faber & Faber, London, 1958.
