= Tears of Rain: Ethnicity and History in Central Western Zambia =

Book by Wim van Binsbergen about ethnicity and history in central western Zambia

Tears of rain: Ethnicity and history in central western Zambia
- Book cover
- Author: Wim van Binsbergen
- Language: English
- Series: Monographs from the African Studies Centre
- Subject: History of Zambia
- Genre: Non-fiction, History
- Publisher: Kegan Paul International, (London, UK). (Note: Reprinted in 2016 by Routledge.)
- Publication date: 1992.
- Publication place: United Kingdom
- Media type: Hardcover, Paperback, Kindle
- Pages: 495pp.
- ISBN: 978-0710304346
- OCLC: 23940601
- Website: Routledge

Tears of rain: Ethnicity and history in central western Zambia is a non-fiction book by Wim van Binsbergen, first published in 1992 by Kegan Paul International and published as an eBook/Kindle by Routledge in 2016. The book explores the history of ethnic groups in central western Zambia.

== Synopsis and structure ==
Tears of Rain: Ethnicity and History in Central Western Zambia focuses on the Nkoya people in western Zambia and their changing identity. The book includes a historical text called Likota lya Bankoya, written in the 1950s by Rev. Johasaphat Shimunika, a Nkoya pastor. Van Binsbergen translated and analyzed this text to explore how Nkoya identity was shaped by colonialism, local politics, and oral tradition. he book shows how the Nkoya used history to claim recognition and resist domination by the Lozi people. It argues that Nkoya identity emerged in response to colonial and postcolonial pressures and was reinforced through written history and political activism. The book also discusses how gender roles changed in Nkoya society, from female ritual authority to male political dominance. Reviewers praised the book's detail, originality, and scholarly ambition. (Note: See the "Reception and academic journal reviews" section for further information.) Some noted that the writing was dense and the theory challenging for general readers.

Chapters:

- Preface
- Part I. Tears of Rain: Ethnicity and history IN central western Zambia
  - Chapter 1. The contemporary point of departure: The Nkoya-speaking people and their chiefs
  - Chapter 2. The Likota lya Bankoya manuscript
  - Chapter 3. Historical criticism of Likota lya Bankoya
  - Chapter 4. State formation in central western Zambia as depicted in Likota lya Bankoya
  - Chapter 5. State and society in nineteenth-century central western Zambia:
  - Chapter 6. Likota lya Bankoya as cosmology and as history: Aspects of Nkoya symbolism and its transformations
- Part II. Likota lya Bankoya
- Part III. The history of the Nkoya people
- Part IV. Reference Material

== Reception and academic reviews ==
- Ferguson, James (1993). "Review of Tears of Rain: Ethnicity and History in Central Western Zambia, by W. van Binsbergen". Africa: Journal of the International African Institute. 63 (2): 269–272. doi:10.2307/1160848. JSTOR 1160848.
- Gann, L. H. (1994). "Review of Tears of Rain: Ethnicity and History in Central Western Zambia, by W. van Binsbergen". The Journal of Interdisciplinary History. 24 (4): 780–781. doi:10.2307/205688. JSTOR 205688.
- Hansen, K. T. (1994). "Review of Tears of Rain: Ethnicity and History in Central Western Zambia, by W. van Binsbergen". Ethnohistory. 41 (3): 508–510. doi:10.2307/481856. JSTOR 481856.
- Jeater, D. (1994). "Review of Tears of Rain: Ethnicity and History in Central Western Zambia, by W. van Binsbergen". Journal of Southern African Studies. 20 (4): 669–672. JSTOR 2636980.
- Kashimani, E. M. (1995). "Review of Tears of Rain: Ethnicity and History in Central Western Zambia, by W. van Binsbergen". The Journal of Modern African Studies. 33 (3): 521–522. JSTOR 161498.
- Macmillan, Hugh (1994). "Review of Tears of Rain: Ethnicity and History in Central Western Zambia, by W. van Binsbergen". Journal of Southern African Studies. 20 (3): 477–479. doi:10.1080/03057079408708428.
- Palmer, Robin (1994). "Review of Tears of Rain: Ethnicity and History in Central Western Zambia, by W. van Binsbergen". Canadian Journal of African Studies / Revue Canadienne des Études Africaines. 28 (1): 142. doi:10.2307/485838. JSTOR 485838.
- Papstein, Robert (1993). "Reading Nkoya History [Review of Tears of Rain: Ethnicity and History in Central Western Zambia, by W. van Binsbergen]". The Journal of African History. 34 (1): 156–158. JSTOR 183044.
- Roberts, A. D. (1994). "Review of Tears of Rain; Ethnicity and History in Central Western Zambia, by W. van Binsbergen". Bulletin of the School of Oriental and African Studies, University of London. 57 (2): 452. JSTOR 620660.
- Siegel, Brian (1993). "Review of Tears of Rain: Ethnicity and History in Central Western Zambia, by W. van Binsbergen". The International Journal of African Historical Studies. 26 (2): 405–406. doi:10.2307/219560. JSTOR 219560.
- van Donge, J. K. (1993). "Review of Tears of Rain: Ethnicity and History in Central Western Zambia, by W. van Binsbergen". Man. 28 (2): 387. doi:10.2307/2803443. JSTOR 2803443.
- Vaughan, Megan (1994). "Review of Tears of Rain: Ethnicity and History in Central Western Zambia, by W. van Binsbergen". The Journal of Modern African Studies. 32 (1): 177–179.
- Vansina, Jan (1993). "Review of Tears of Rain. Ethnicity and History in Central Western Zambia, by W. van Binsbergen". Anthropos. 88 (1/3): 215–217. JSTOR 40462764.

== Release information ==
- Hardcover: 1992 (First Edition), Kegan Paul International, 518pp. ISBN 9780710304346.
- Paperback: 2016, Routledge, 518pp. ISBN 9781138996816.
- Kindle/eBook: 2016, Routledge.

== About the author ==
Wim van Binsbergen was born in 1947 in Amsterdam, the Netherlands. He earned his Ph.D. from Vrije Universiteit Amsterdam. He later became a professor of anthropology at the same university and was head of the Department of Political and Historical Studies at the African Studies Centre in Leiden.

== See also ==
- A history of Zambia
- Bibliography of the history of Zambia
