= Benedict Kingsbury =

New Zealand international law scholar

Benedict William Kingsbury is Vice Dean and Director of the Institute for International Law and Justice at New York University and a leading scholar in international law and diplomacy. He was recently also announced as a faculty director for the new NYU Law Guarini Institute for Global Legal Studies. Born in Holland and raised in Hamilton, New Zealand he was a Rhodes Scholar in 1982, a commercial law graduate (LLB Honors) from Canterbury University in Christchurch, New Zealand and a doctor of International Relations and Law at Balliol College, University of Oxford. He lectured at Oxford University and Duke University prior to his New York University Law School appointment. He is an honorary citizen of San Ginesio in Italy, the birthplace of Alberico Gentili (1552-1608). He received an honorary doctorate in law from Tilburg University in 2016. From 2013 to 2018 he was joint Editor in Chief of the American Journal of International Law (founded 1907). He received NYU Law School's Podell Distinguished Teaching Award in 2019.

A leading academic on the rights of indigenous peoples in international law, his professional interests also include global administrative law, the history and theory of international law, and the international law of global governance. His ongoing research programs at NYU involve work on infrastructure as regulation, and on global tech law and global data law.

His publications include two books edited with Sir Adam Roberts on the United Nations and Hugo Grotius.

== Publications ==
- Megaregulation Contested: Global Economic Ordering After TPP (Oxford University Press, 2019) (ed. with David M. Malone, Paul Mertenskötter, Richard B. Stewart, Thomas Streinz and Atsushi Sunami)
- Hacia el Derecho Administrativo Global: Fundamentos, Principios y Ámbito de Aplicación (Global Law Press-Editorial Depeche Global, 2016) (with Richard B. Stewart)
- The Quiet Power of Indicators: Measuring Governance, Corruption, and Rule of Law (Cambridge University Press, 2015) (ed. with Sally Engle Merry and Kevin E. Davis)
- Ge Lao Xiu Si Yu Guo Ji Guan Xi (Hugo Grotius and International Relations) (2014) (ed. with Hedley Bull and Adam Roberts)
- Governance by Indicators: Global Power Through Quantification and Rankings (Oxford University Press, 2012) (ed. with Kevin E. Davis, Angelina Fisher and Sally Engle Merry)
- International Financial Institutions and Global Legal Governance (World Bank, 2012) (ed. with Hassane Cisse and Daniel Bradlow)
- Alberico Gentili, The Wars of the Romans: A Critical Edition and Translation of De Armis Romanis (Oxford University Press, 2011) (ed. with Benjamin Straumann)
- The Roman Foundations of the Law of Nations: Alberico Gentili and the Justice of Empire (Oxford University Press, 2010) (ed. with Benjamin Straumann)
- United Nations, Divided World, Chinese edition with fully revised Introductory chapter and appendices, and foreword by Professor Wang Jisi of Peking University (Beijing: Central Composition and Translation Press, 2010) (ed. with Sir Adam Roberts)
- El Surgimiento del Derecho Administrativo Global: Desafios para America Latina (The New Global Administrative Law: Challenges for Latin America) (Res Publica, 2009) (ed. with others)
- Symposium on 'Armed Activities on the Territory of the Congo: Democratic Republic of Congo v. Uganda' (40 NYU Journal of International Law and Politics 1 -217, 2008) (with J.H.H. Weiler)
- Symposium on Global Governance and Global Administrative Law in the International Legal Order (17 European Journal of International Law 1–278, 2006) (ed. with Nico Krisch)
- Indigenous Groups and the Politics of Recognition in Asia: Cases from Japan, Taiwan, West Papua, Bali, the People's Republic of China, and Gilgit (II 1-2 International Journal on Minority and Group Rights 1–228, 2004) (ed. with Kirsty Gover)
- Alberico Gentili e Il Mondo Extraeuropeo: Atti Del Convegno Settima Giornata Gentiliana (Dott. A. Giuffre Editore, 2001)
- Indigenous Peoples of Asia (Association of Asian Studies, 1995) (with R.H. Barnes, Andrew Gray et al.)
- United Nations, Divided World: The UN's Roles in International Relations (Oxford University Press, 1993) (ed. with Sir Adam Roberts)
- The International Politics of the Environment (Oxford University Press, 1992) (with Andrew Hurrell)
- Hugo Grotius and International Relations (Oxford University Press, 1990) (with Hedley Bull, Sir Adam Roberts et al.)

== Lectures ==
- What, How, and Who Should Public International Law Regulate? New Problems of Global Administrative Governance in the Lecture Series of the United Nations Audiovisual Library of International Law.
