= A history of Zambia =

Book by Andrew D. Roberts about the history of Zambia

- Book cover
- Author: Andrew D. Roberts
- Language: English
- Subject: History of Zambia
- Genre: Non-fiction, History
- Publisher: Heinemann
- Publication date: 1976
- Publication place: United Kingdom
- Media type: Hardcover, Paperback
- Pages: 288
- ISBN: 9780841902916
- Website: A History of Zambia at Google Books

A History of Zambia is a non-fiction book by Andrew D. Roberts, first published in 1976 by Heinemann.

== Synopsis and structure ==
Andrew Roberts’ A History of Zambia is recognized by scholars as a clear, well-structured, and balanced account of Zambia’s history. Reviewers note the book for its strong emphasis on the precolonial and early colonial periods.Roberts begins with an overview of Zambia’s physical geography and early human history, including the Stone Age and Iron Age. He explains how different cultural traditions developed across regions and how societies organized politically, economically, and socially. The book traces the rise of chieftainship and the growth of trade networks before colonial rule, with attention to key regions such as the Lozi kingdom and Kazembe’s domain. It then examines the effects of African migrations, such as the arrival of the Ngoni and Kololo, and the expansion of long-distance trade.

Roberts details the gradual British occupation in the late 19th century and continues through the colonial period, highlighting the growth of mining, labor migration, and the emergence of nationalist movements. He ends with Zambia’s transition to independence in 1964 and its first decade as a sovereign nation. Reviewers note the book’s use of archaeology and oral tradition, as well as its readable style and features like maps and a structured bibliography. While some suggest the later chapters are more concise, they agree the book offers a valuable and accessible introduction to Zambia’s past, suitable for both scholars and general readers.

Chapters:

- Preface
- Note on Pronunciation
- I. The Natural Setting: This chapter introduces Zambia’s physical geography, including its geology, climate, vegetation, and patterns of human settlement.
- II. The Stone Age: Covers the archaeological periods of the Early, Middle, and Late Stone Age, outlining the development of early human activity in the region.
- III. The Iron Age in the North: Examines Iron Age developments in northern Zambia, including regional variations, the significance of rock art, early copper-working in central areas, and cultural traditions such as the Luangwa and Western Zambia traditions.
- IV. The Iron Age in the South: Focuses on southern Zambia’s Iron Age cultures, including the Shongwe, Kalundu, Kalomo, and ‘Tonga Diaspora’ traditions, along with the archaeological site of Ingombe Ilede.
- V. The Peoples of Zambia, c.1500–c.1700: Analyzes ethnic traditions and social organization during this period, covering economic systems, languages, religion, and political structures.
- VI. The Growth of Chieftainship, c.1700–c.1840: Explores the emergence and regional variations of chieftainship, including developments in the east, south, and north-west, and the rise of notable polities like Kazembe and the Lozi kingdom.
- VII. The Expansion of Trade, c.1700–c.1840: Describes the growth of local and long-distance trade networks, focusing on copper and gold trade, Portuguese involvement at Zumbo, and interactions involving Kazembe and western regions including Angola.
- VIII. African Intruders, c.1840–c.1890: Discusses incursions by African groups such as the Ngoni, Chikunda, and Kololo, the reconstitution of the Lozi kingdom, and how external trade and southern ethnic groups like the Tonga and Ila were affected.
- IX. The British Take Over, c.1860–1900: Covers the period of European intervention, including missionary efforts by Livingstone, Rhodes’ imperial ambitions, the establishment of British colonial rule, and concludes with a summary of this transition.
- X. Mines and Migration, 1900–c.1950: Traces the history of mining and labor migration, from company rule and early colonial administration to the development of the Copperbelt and the emergence of an unbalanced economy.
- XI. The Growth of a Nation, c.1930–1964: Explores nationalist stirrings, African religious movements, labor politics in the Copperbelt, the colonial response, the rise of nationalist parties, and events leading to Zambia’s independence.
- XII. Ten Years of Independence, 1964–1974: Analyzes the first decade of post-independence Zambia, including political realignment, state economic policy, regional liberation movements, and the promotion of national unity and freedom.
- Appendixes: Includes two supporting sections: one on the copper industry in pre-colonial Central Africa and another listing colonial administrators and governors.
- Bibliography
- Index

== Reception and academic reviews ==
- Wright, Martin (1978). "Review of A History of Zambia, by A. Roberts". Journal of Southern African Studies. 4 (2): 268. JSTOR 2636363.
- Schecter, R. E. (1978). "Review of A History of Zambia, by A. Roberts". The International Journal of African Historical Studies. 11 (1): 124–126. doi:10.2307/217062. JSTOR 217062.
- Miller, J. C. (1978). "Review of A History of Zambia, by A. Roberts". ASA Review of Books. 4: 29–30. doi:10.2307/532231. JSTOR 532231.
- Smaldone, J. P. (1977). "Review of Equatorial Africa; A History of Zambia, by J. C. Miller & A. Roberts". The History Teacher. 10 (4): 633–634. doi:10.2307/492191. JSTOR 492191.
- Palmer, R. (1978). "Review of A History of Zambia, by A. Roberts". African Affairs. 77 (307): 264–266. doi:10.1093/oxfordjournals.afraf.a096977. JSTOR 721620.
- Stuart, R. G. (1978). "Review of A History of Zambia, by A. Roberts". Canadian Journal of African Studies / Revue Canadienne des Études Africaines. 12 (1): 141–143. doi:10.2307/483521. JSTOR 483521.
- Gann, L. H. (1977). "The Zambian Past Review of A History of Zambia, by A. Roberts". The Journal of African History. 18 (3): 458–459. doi:10.1017/S0021853700027389. JSTOR 180645.
- Scarritt, James R. (1978). "Urban Workers, Villagers and Political Parties in Zambia [Review of Rural Responses to Industrialization: A Study of Village Zambia; Labour, Race, and Colonial Rule: The Copperbelt from 1924 to Independence; The Politics of Change in a Zambian Community; Zambia 1890-1964: The Colonial Period; A History of Zambia, by R. H. Bates, E. L. Berger, G. C. Bond, R. Hall, & A. Roberts]". Africa Today. 25 (3): 59–66. JSTOR 4185791.
- Langworthy, Harry W. (1978). "Review of A History of Zambia, by A. Roberts". The American Historical Review. 83 (2): 498. doi:10.2307/1862451. JSTOR 1862451.

== Release information ==
- Hardcover: 1976 (First Edition), Heinemann, 288pp. ISBN 9780841902916.
- Paperback: 1979, Heinemann, 288pp. ISBN 9780841902916.

== Similar or related works ==
- Tears of rain: Ethnicity and history in central western Zambia by Wim van Binsbergen (1992).

== About the author ==
Andrew D. Roberts is a historian and author known for his works on African history, particularly the history of Zambia. He has written extensively on the political and social dynamics of the region.

== See also ==
- History of Zambia
- Zambia
