= Andrew D. Roberts =

British historian of Africa (1937–2024)

Andrew Dunlop Roberts (2 September 1937 – 16 October 2024) was a British historian of Africa. In 1998 he retired from the School of Oriental and African Studies, as Emeritus Professor of the History of Africa.

== Life and career ==
Andrew Roberts was the eldest child of two British writers, Michael Roberts and Janet Adam Smith. After studying at Cambridge University, he undertook research in Kampala before working as an oral historian in Dar es Salaam. He was a doctoral student of Jan Vansina at University of Wisconsin–Madison, researching the history of the Bemba people in Zambia. His doctoral field research, originally conducted in 1964–1965, ultimately resulted in the 1973 monograph A history of the Bemba. From 1968 to 1971 he was a research fellow at the University of Zambia.

Roberts later took up a post at the School of African and Oriental Studies, taking early retirement from SOAS in 1998.

Roberts died on 16 October 2024, at the age of 87.

== Works ==
- Tanzania before 1900. Nairobi: Published for the Historical Association of Tanzania by the East African Publishing House, 1968.
- Recording East Africa's past: a brief guide for the amateur historian . Nairobi: Published for the History Department, University College, Dar es Salaam, by the East African Publishing House, 1968.
- A history of the Bemba; political growth and change in north-eastern Zambia before 1900. Madison: University of Wisconsin Press, 1973.
- A history of Zambia. London: Heinemann, 1976.
- The Colonial moment in Africa : essays on the movement of minds and materials, 1900-1940. Cambridge: Cambridge University Press, 1986.
- (ed.) The Cambridge History of Africa. Vol. 7: From 1905 to 1940. Cambridge: Cambridge University Press, 1986.
