= Adam Roberts (scholar) =

British international relations scholar

Sir Adam Roberts KCMG FBA (born 29 August 1940) is Emeritus Professor of International Relations at the University of Oxford, a senior research fellow in Oxford University's Department of Politics and International Relations, and an emeritus fellow of Balliol College, Oxford.

== Background ==
Roberts was born in Penrith, Cumbria, the son of the poet and teacher Michael Roberts and the writer and editor Janet Adam Smith. He went to Westminster School, London, 1953–8. He studied modern history at the University of Oxford (Magdalen College), 1959–62, winning the Stanhope essay prize, 1961.

== Career ==
Assistant Editor, Peace News, London, 1962–5. Noel Buxton Student in International Relations, London School of Economics and Political Science (LSE), 1965–8. Lecturer in International Relations at the London School of Economics and Political Science, 1968–81. Alastair Buchan Reader in International Relations at University of Oxford, 1981–6. Montague Burton Professor of International Relations at Oxford University, 1986–2007.

With interests in civil resistance, international law, the United Nations, strategic studies, and the history (and theories) of international relations, his publications include works on the United Nations and on Hugo Grotius jointly edited with Professor Benedict Kingsbury. Roberts was elected a Fellow of the British Academy (the UK's national academy for the humanities and social sciences) in 1990, serving as its President (2009–13). He served on the Council of the International Institute for Strategic Studies (2002–08); on the Council for Science and Technology (2010–13); and on the United Kingdom Defence Academy Advisory Board (2003–15).

In 2002, he was appointed Knight Commander of the Order of St Michael and St George for services to the study and practice of international relations. He is an Honorary Fellow of the London School of Economics & Political Science, of St Antony's College, Oxford, and of Cumbria University. He has a Guest Professorship at Nankai University, Tianjin, China (2012); and is honorary professor, Centre for the Study of Terrorism and Political Violence at St Andrew's University (2013- ). He has been awarded honorary doctorates by King's College London (2010); Aberdeen University (2012); Aoyama Gakuin University, Tokyo (2012), and Bath University (2014). He was elected a Foreign Honorary Member, American Academy of Arts and Sciences, in 2011; and a Member, American Philosophical Society, 2013. His interests include mountaineering and cycling.

He has published articles in numerous journals, including American Journal of International Law, British Yearbook of International Law, International Affairs, International Security, Review of International Studies, Survival and The Times Literary Supplement. His publications include:

== Recent articles and book chapters ==
- 'Pandemics and Politics', Survival, London, vol. 62, no. 5, October–November 2020, pp. 7–40. Available at .
- 'Foundational Myths in the Laws of War: The 1863 Lieber Code, and the 1864 Geneva Convention', Melbourne Journal of International Law, vol. 20, no. 1, July 2019, pp. 158–96. ISSN 1444-8602. Available at .
- 'The Use of Force: A System of Selective Security', in Sebastian von Einsiedel, David M. Malone and Bruno Stagno Ugarte (eds.), The UN Security Council in the 21st Century, Lynne Rienner, Boulder, Colorado, 2016, pp. 349–71. ISBN 978-1-62637-258-0 (hardback); 978-1-62637-259-7 (paperback).
- 'Terrorism Research: Past, Present and Future', Studies in Conflict & Terrorism, vol. 38, no. 1, January 2015, pp. 62–74. Print edition ISSN 1057-610X. Online ISSN 1521-0731. Available at .
- 'The Long Peace Getting Longer', Survival, London, vol. 54, no. 1, February–March 2012, pp. 175–83. Print edition ISSN 0039-6338. Online ISSN 1468-2699. Available at . (Review essay on Steven Pinker, The Better Angels of our Nature.)
- 'Simon Frederick Peter Halliday, 1946–2010', Proceedings of the British Academy, vol. 172: Biographical Memoirs of Fellows no. X, Oxford University Press, Oxford, 2011, pp. 143–69. ISBN 978-0-19-726490-4. ISSN 0068-1202. Available at .
- 'The Civilian in Modern War', in Hew Strachan and Sibylle Scheipers (eds.), The Changing Character of War, Oxford University Press, Oxford, 2011, pp. 357–80. ISBN 978-0-19-959673-7 (hardback).
- 'The Civilian in Modern War', Yearbook of International Humanitarian Law, vol. 12, 2009, T.M.C. Asser Press, The Hague, 2010, pp. 13–51. ISBN 978-90-6704-335-9; ISSN 1389-1359.
- 'Lives and Statistics: Are 90% of War Victims Civilians?’, Survival, London, vol. 52, no. 3, June–July 2010, pp. 115–35. Print edition ISSN 0039-6338. Online ISSN 1468-2699. Available at .
- 'Detainees: Misfits in Peace and War', in Sibylle Scheipers (ed.), Prisoners in War, Oxford University Press, Oxford, 2010, pp. 263–80. ISBN 978-0-19-957757-6.
- 'An "Incredibly Swift Transition": Reflections on the End of the Cold War', in Melvyn P. Leffler and Odd Arne Westad (eds.), The Cambridge History of the Cold War, vol. III, Endings, Cambridge University Press, Cambridge, 2010, pp. 513–34. ISBN 978-0-521-83721-7.
- 'The Equal Application of the Laws of War: A Principle under Pressure', International Review of the Red Cross, Cambridge, vol. 90, no. 872, December 2008, pp. 931–62. ISSN 1816-3831. EISSN 1607-5889. Available at .
- 'Doctrine and Reality in Afghanistan', Survival, London, vol. 51, no. 1, February–March 2009, pp. 29–60. Print edition ISSN 0039-6338. Online ISSN 1468-2699.
- 'Torture and Incompetence in the "War on Terror"’, Survival, London, vol. 49, no. 1, Spring 2007. (Review article.) Print edition ISSN 0039-6338. Online ISSN 1468-2699. Available at .
- 'Transformative Military Occupation: Applying the Laws of War and Human Rights', American Journal of International Law, Washington DC, vol. 100, no. 3, July 2006. ISSN 0002-9300. Available at .
- 'The Laws of War in the War on Terror', in Fred L. Borch and Paul S. Wilson (eds.), International Law and the War on Terror (US Naval War College, International Law Studies, vol. 79), Naval War College, Newport, Rhode Island, 2003. Available at .

== Books ==
- (with Michael J. Willis, Rory McCarthy and Timothy Garton Ash) (eds.). Civil Resistance in the Arab Spring: Triumphs and Disasters, Oxford University Press, Oxford, January 2016. ISBN 978-0-19-874902-8. US edition. Article arising from the book in The Guardian, London, 15 January 2016. Discussion of the book with Professor Rashid Khalidi at the Carnegie Council for Ethics in International Affairs, New York, 10 February 2016, on Ustream.TV.
- Kadirgamar, Lakshman (15 September 2012). Democracy, Sovereignty and Terror: Lakshman Kadirgamar on the Foundations of International Order, I.B. Tauris, London, 2012. ISBN 9781848853072. ISBN 978 1 84885 307 2 (hardback). On Google.
- (with Benedict Kingsbury) (eds.) 全球治理：分列世界中的联合国 (Global Governance: United Nations in a Divided World), trans. Zhicheng Wu and colleagues at Nankai University, Central Compilation & Translation Press, Beijing, 2010. ISBN 978-7-5117-0220-3. (A specially adapted version of United Nations, Divided World: The UN's Roles in International Relations, Oxford University Press, 2nd edition, 1993, and incorporating a new introduction by the editors, revised/new appendices, and Foreword by Professor Wang Jisi of Peking University.)
- (with Timothy Garton Ash) (ed.). Civil Resistance and Power Politics: The Experience of Non-violent Action from Gandhi to the Present, Oxford University Press, 2009. ISBN 978-0-19-955201-6 (hardback); ISBN 978-0-19-969145-6 (paperback, 2011, with new Foreword on the Arab Spring). US edition. On Google.
- (with Vaughan Lowe, Jennifer Welsh and Dominik Zaum), ed. (6 June 2010). The United Nations Security Council and War: The Evolution of Thought and Practice since 1945, Oxford University Press, 2008. Oxford University Press. ISBN 9780199583300. ISBN 978-0-19-953343-5 (hardback); ISBN 978-0-19-958330-0 (paperback). US edition. On Google.
- (with Richard Guelff) (ed.). Documents on the Laws of War, 3rd edn., Oxford University Press, 2000. ISBN 0-19-876389-1 (hardback); ISBN 0-19-876390-5 (paperback). US edition.
- (with Benedict Kingsbury) (ed.). United Nations, Divided World: The UN's Roles in International Relations, 2nd edn., Oxford University Press, 1993. ISBN 978-0-19-827926-6 (paperback). US edition.
- Civil Resistance in the East European and Soviet Revolutions, Cambridge, Mass.: Albert Einstein Institution, 1991. ISBN 1-880813-04-1. Available at.
- (with Hedley Bull and Benedict Kingsbury) (ed.). Hugo Grotius and International Relations, Oxford University Press, 1990. ISBN 0-19-825569-1 (hardback); ISBN 0-19-827771-7 (paperback). US edition. Oxford Scholarship Online. On Google.
- (with Lawrence Freedman; et al. Terrorism and International Order, Routledge & Kegan Paul for Royal Institute of International Affairs, London, 1986. ISBN 0-7102-1141-4.
- Nations in Arms: The Theory and Practice of Territorial Defence, 2nd edn., Macmillan, Basingstoke, 1986.ISBN 0-333-39306-6 (hardback); ISBN 0-333-37307-3 (paperback). On Google.
- (with Philip Windsor). Czechoslovakia 1968: Reform, Repression and Resistance, Chatto & Windus for Institute for Strategic Studies, London, 1969. ISBN 0-7011-1498-3 (paperback).
- (ed.) The Strategy of Civilian Defence: Non-violent Resistance to Aggression, Faber, London, 1967. (Also published as Civilian Resistance as a National Defense, Stackpole Books, Harrisburg, US, 1968; and, with a new Introduction on 'Czechoslovakia and Civilian Defence', as Civilian Resistance as a National Defence, Penguin Books, Harmondsworth, UK, and Baltimore, US, 1969. ISBN 0-14-021080-6.)

== See also ==
- Civilian-based defense

== Lectures ==
- The Equal Application of the Laws of War: A Principle Under Pressure in the Lecture Series of the United Nations Audiovisual Library of International Law
- Reinventing the Wheel: The cost of neglecting international history the 2010 Gresham Special Lecture delivered in the Guildhall, City of London.
