= Faber Book of Modern Verse =

Poetry anthology

- Author: Michael Roberts
- Language: English
- Publisher: Faber and Faber
- Publication date: 1936
- LC Class: PR1225 .R58

The Faber Book of Modern Verse was a poetry anthology, edited in its first edition by Michael Roberts, and published in 1936 by Faber and Faber. There was a second edition (1951) edited by Anne Ridler, and a third edition (1965) edited by Donald Hall. The selection was of poems in English printed after 1910, which meant that work by Gerard Manley Hopkins could be included. A later edition was edited by Peter Porter.

== Poets in the Faber Book of Modern Verse (1965) ==
Some of the poets in the 1936 edition were not included in the 1965 edition, which also had the addition of a substantial supplement:

Conrad Aiken - W. H. Auden - George Barker - John Berryman - Robert Bly - Hart Crane - E. E. Cummings - Donald Davie - James Dickey - H. D. - Keith Douglas - Richard Eberhart - T. S. Eliot - William Empson - David Gascoyne - W. S. Graham - Robert Graves - Thom Gunn - John Heath-Stubbs - Geoffrey Hill - Gerard Manley Hopkins - Ted Hughes - T. E. Hulme - David Jones - Philip Larkin - D. H. Lawrence - Denise Levertov - C. Day Lewis - Robert Lowell - Norman MacCaig - Hugh MacDiarmid - Louis MacNeice - Charles Madge - W. S. Merwin - Christopher Middleton - Harold Monro - Marianne Moore - Edwin Muir - Howard Nemerov - Charles Olson - Wilfred Owen - Sylvia Plath - Ezra Pound - F. T. Prince - Kathleen Raine - John Crowe Ransom - Herbert Read - Laura Riding - Anne Ridler - Michael Roberts - Theodore Roethke - Isaac Rosenberg - Louis Simpson - Edith Sitwell - W. D. Snodgrass - Stephen Spender - Wallace Stevens - Allen Tate - Dylan Thomas - R. S. Thomas - Charles Tomlinson - Vernon Watkins - Richard Wilbur - William Carlos Williams - James Wright - W. B. Yeats

== See also ==
- 1936 in poetry
- 1951 in poetry
- 1965 in poetry
- 1936 in literature
- 1951 in literature
- 1965 in literature
- American poetry
- English poetry
- List of poetry anthologies
