= Social Science Library =

Academic library in Oxford, England

Coordinates: 51.7572°N 1.2469°W

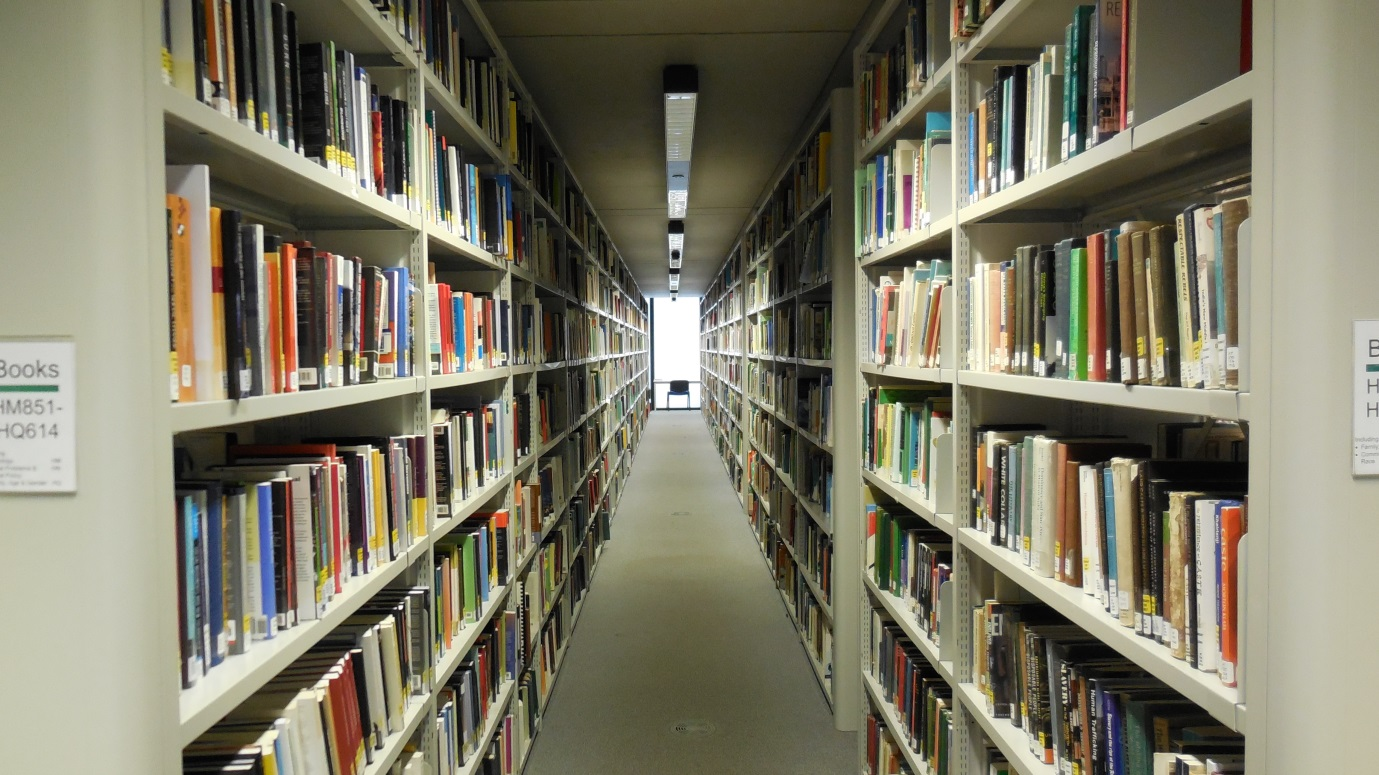
View between SSL shelves

The Bodleian Social Science Library, Oxford (SSL) is the main teaching social sciences lending library at the University of Oxford, England. The library supports taught programmes for both undergraduates and postgraduates, and houses a dedicated research collection part of which contains legal deposit material out-housed from the Bodleian Library. The Social Science Library uses the Library of Congress classification scheme.

The library is located in the Manor Road Building on Manor Road, Oxford. The Manor Road Building was designed by Foster & Partners.

== History ==
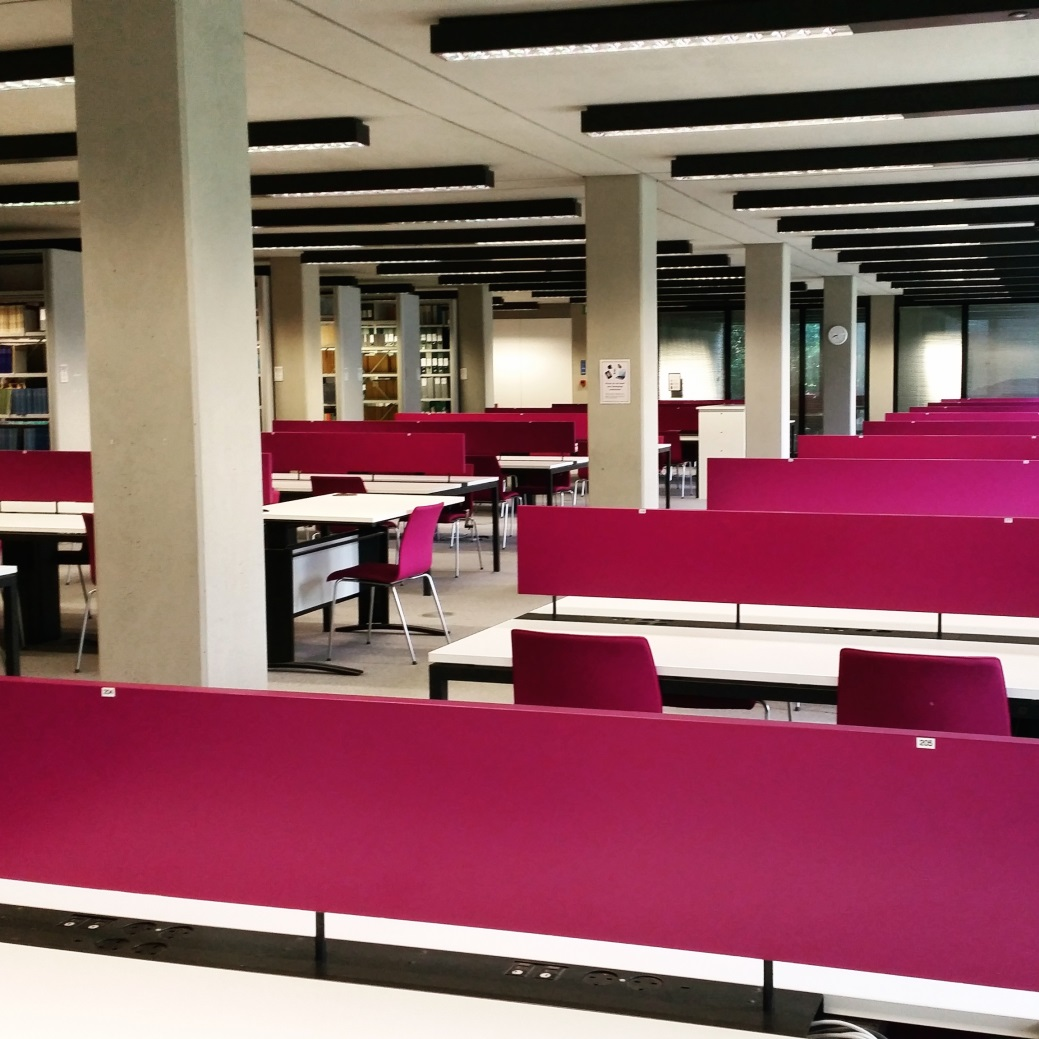
Seating in SSL

The Social Science Library officially opened 1 October 2004, following a period in which subject collections housed within smaller units were amalgamated into a central library site. The institution was preceded by the Social Studies Libraries; a grouping of three separate libraries:

- Politics, International Relations, and Sociology Library (PIRS)
- Economics Library (formerly the Institute of Economics and Statistics (IES) until 1999)
- Social Policy and Social Work Library (SPSW)

These three libraries were the first to be combined, at the site of the existing Economics Library, between 2002 and 2003. Further integration followed with the Criminology Library and Socio-Legal Studies Library moving to the site in 2004. The collections housed at the International Development Centre (IDS) at Queen Elizabeth House joined the Social Science Library after its launch, in the summer of 2005. Material from the Slavonic and East European collections, previously kept within the Bodleian Library Slavonic reading room, also moved into the library later that year.

In March 2010 the Social Science Library was renamed the Bodleian Social Science Library. This was as result of the Oxford University Library Services - of which the Social Science Library was a part - changing its name to the Bodleian Libraries.

== Subject coverage ==
Subject coverage includes:

- Criminology
- Economics
- International Development
- Politics and International Relations
- Russian and East European Studies
- Social Anthropology
- Social Policy and Social Work
- Socio-Legal Studies
- Sociology
