= List of companies of Zambia =

Location of Zambia

The Republic of Zambia is a landlocked country in Southern Africa, neighbouring the Democratic Republic of the Congo to the north, Tanzania to the north-east, Malawi to the east, Mozambique, Zimbabwe, Botswana and Namibia to the south, and Angola to the west. The capital city is Lusaka, in the south-central part of Zambia. The population is concentrated mainly around Lusaka in the south and the Copperbelt Province to the northwest, the core economic hubs of the country.

The Zambian economy has historically been based on the copper-mining industry. The discovery of copper is owed partly to Frederick Russell Burnham, the famous American scout who worked for Cecil Rhodes.

== Notable firms ==
This list includes notable companies with primary headquarters located in the country. The industry and sector follow the Industry Classification Benchmark taxonomy. Organizations which have ceased operations are included and noted as defunct.

Notable companies Status: P=Private, S=State; A=Active, D=Defunct
Name	Industry	Sector	Headquarters	Founded	Notes	Status	
Access Bank Zambia	Financials	Banks	Lusaka	2009	Commercial bank	P	A
Aero Zambia	Consumer services	Airlines	Lusaka	1996	Airline, defunct 2000	P	D
Bangweulu Power Company Limited	Renewable Energy	Solar power	Lusaka	2017	Owned by Consortium Members: Neoen, First Solar and IDC Zambia	P	A
Cavmont Bank	Financials	Banks	Lusaka	2004	Commercial bank	P	A
Chilanga Cement	Industrials	Building materials & fixtures	Chilanga	1949	Cement, LuSE:CHIL	P	A
Copperbelt Energy Corporation	Utilities	Electricity	Kitwe	1997	Power Generation and Transmission, Lusaka Stock Exchange:CECZ	P	A
Atlas Mara Bank Zambia Limited	Financials	Banks	Lusaka	1986	Commercial bank, formerly Finance Bank Zambia Limited	P	A
First Alliance Bank Zambia Limited	Financials	Banks	Lusaka	1994	Commercial bank	P	A
FQM Trident Limited	Basic Materials	Mining	Kalumbila	2006	Products: Copper Ownership: First Quantum Minerals 100%	P	A
Indeni Petroleum Refinery	Energy	Petroleum	Ndola	1973	Products: Gasoline, Jet fuel, LPG, Asphalt, Fuel oil	P	A
Indo-Zambia Bank Limited	Financials	Banks	Lusaka	1984	Commercial bank	P	A
Intermarket Bank	Financials	Banks	Lusaka	1971	Acquired by Afriland First Bank (Cameroon) in 2010	P	D
Investrust Bank	Financials	Banks	Lusaka	1996	Commercial bank, Lusaka Stock Exchange:INVE	P	A
Kansanshi Mining Plc	Basic Materials	Mining	Solwezi	2005	Products: Copper and Gold, JV Partners: First Quantum Minerals 80%, ZCCM-IH 20% (LuSE:ZCCM)	P	A
Konkola Copper Mines	Basic materials	Nonferrous metals	Chingola	1957	Products: Copper, JV Partners: Vedanta Resources (UK) 79.4%. ZCCM-IH 20.6%	P	A
Lumwana Mining Company (LMC)	Basic Materials	Mining	Lumwana	1999	Products: Copper, 100% Owned by Barrick Gold	P	A
Lusaka Stock Exchange	Financials	Investment services	Lusaka	1994	Primary stock exchange	P	A
Mopani Copper Mines	Basic Materials	Mining	Kitwe		Products: Copper, Cobalt	P	A
Mobile Transactions Zambia	Financials	Specialty finance	Lusaka	2009	Money movement firm	P	A
Ndola Lime Company Limited	Industrials	Mining	Ndola	1931	Products: Limestone	P	A
Ngonye Power Company Limited	Renewable Energy	Solar Power	Kafue	2018	JV Partners: Enel Green Power and IDC Zambia	P	A
Railway Systems of Zambia	Industrials	Railroads	Lusaka	2003	Charter revoked 2012	P	A
Standard Chartered Zambia	Financials	Banks	Lusaka	1906	Commercial bank, part of Standard Chartered (UK), Lusaka Stock Exchange:SCBL	P	A
The Post	Consumer services	Publishing	Lusaka	1991	Newspaper	P	A
Times of Zambia	Consumer services	Publishing	Ndola	1943	Newspaper	P	A
Zambeef Products	Consumer goods	Food products	Lusaka	1994	Beef producer, Lusaka Stock Exchange:ZMBF	P	A
Zambezi Airlines	Consumer services	Airlines	Lusaka	2008	Airline, defunct 2012	P	D
Zambia Airways	Consumer services	Airlines	Lusaka	1964	flag carrier Airline, defunct 1995, Relaunched 2021. JV Partners: IDC 55%. Ethiopian Airlines 45%	P	A
Zambia Daily Mail	Consumer services	Publishing	Lusaka	1965	State run newspaper	S	A
Zambia National Commercial Bank (Zanaco)	Financials	Banks	Lusaka	1969	Commercial bank, Lusaka Stock Exchange:ZNCO	P	A
Zambia Railways	Industrials	Railroads	Lusaka	1905	Railways	S	A
Zambian Airways	Consumer services	Airlines	Lusaka	1948	Airline, defunct 2009	P	D
Zambian Breweries	Consumer goods	Brewers	Lusaka	1963	Brewery, Lusaka Stock Exchange:ZABR	P	A
Zambia Sugar	Consumer Goods	Agriculture	Mazabuka	1964	Sugar, Lusaka Stock Exchange:ZSUG	P	A
ZAMNET	Telecommunications	Fixed line telecommunications	Lusaka	1994	ISP	P	A
ZamPost	Industrials	Delivery services	Ndola	1896	Postal service	S	A
Zamtel	Telecommunications	Fixed line telecommunications	Lusaka	1994	Telecom	S	A
ZCCM Investments Holdings	Basic materials	Nonferrous metals	Lusaka	2000	Nationalized copper mines, Lusaka Stock Exchange:ZCCM	S	A
ZESCO	Utilities	Electricity	Lusaka	1970	Power Generation, Transmission & Distribution	S	A

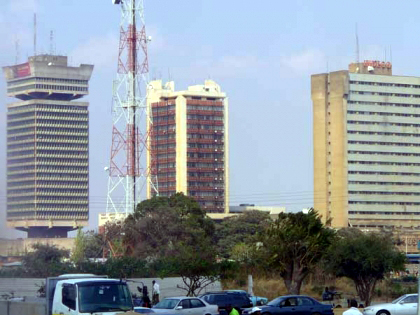
Lusaka financial district.

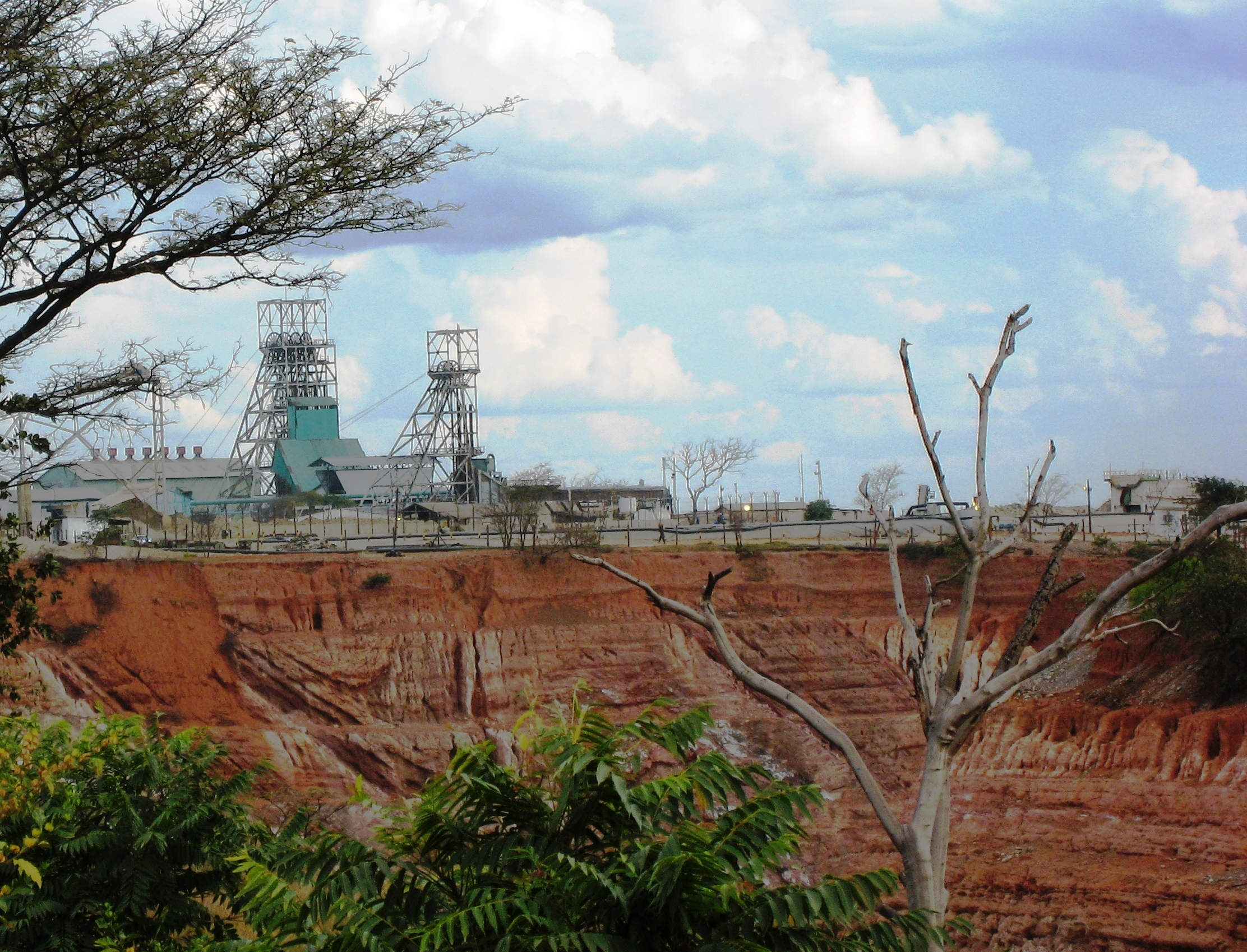
Mopani Copper Mines (Nkana Mine) in Kitwe.

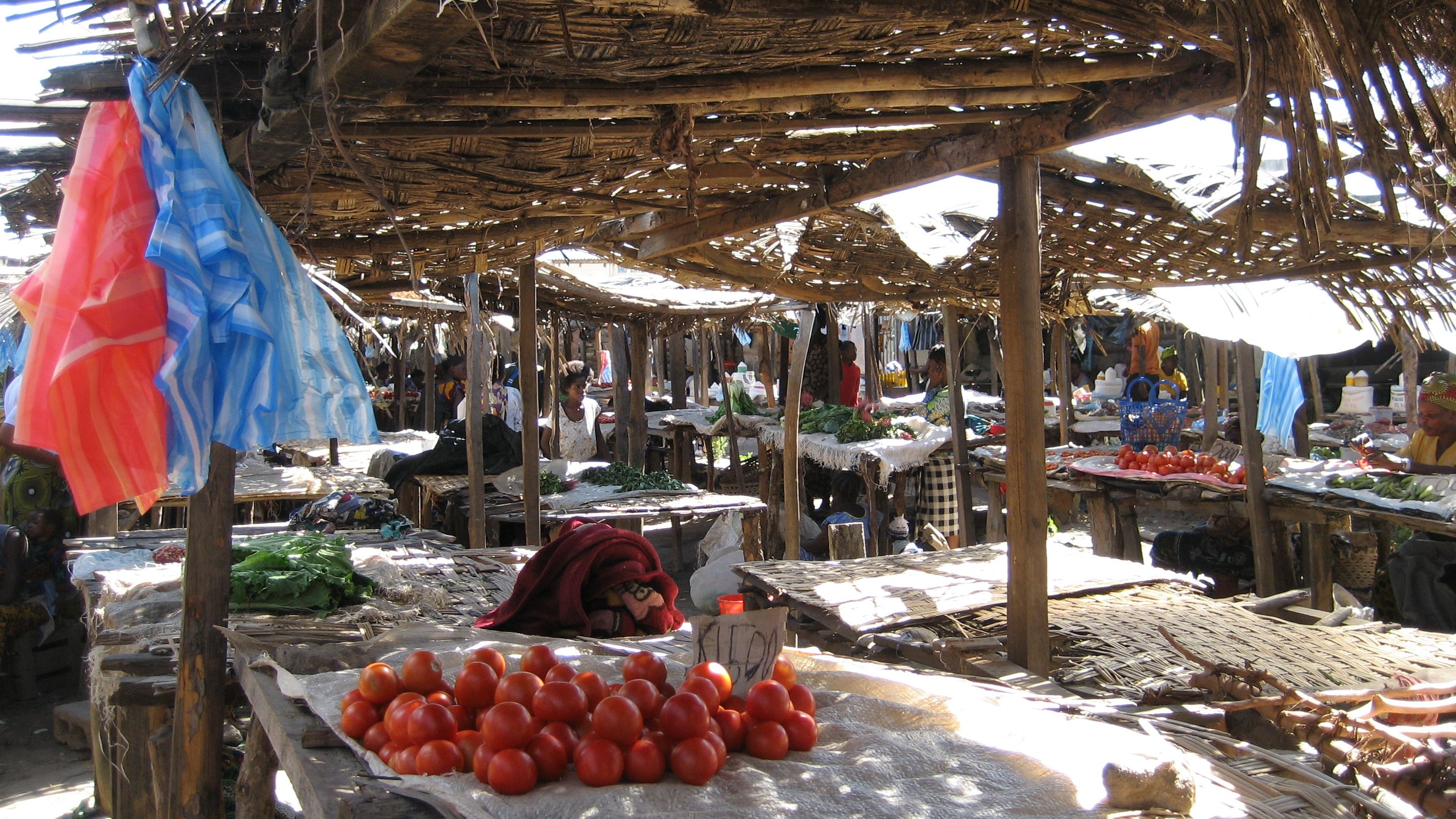
Marketplace in Mansa, Zambia.

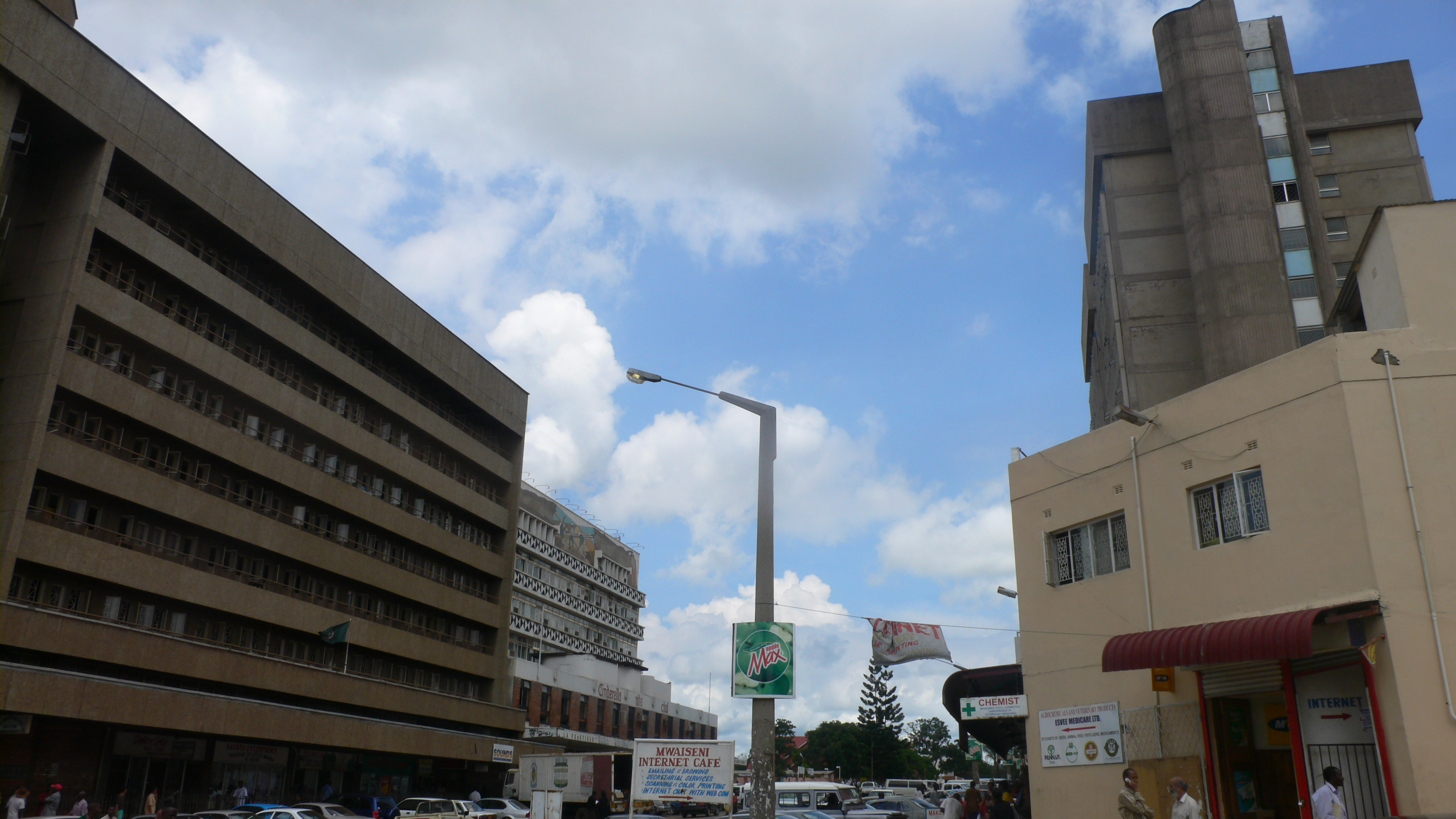
Kitwe City Scape

== List of Largest Firms ==
Top ten firms by revenues in ZMW.

Name	FY2021 Revenue (ZMW)	Source	Notes
First Quantum Minerals Zambia (FQMZ)	72,828,000,000		Zambia operations of First Quantum Minerals, Kansanshi and FQM Trident (Sentinel) Mining Operations
Lumwana Mining Company Limited (LMC)	16,835,000,000		Zambia operations of Barrick Gold Based on US$962m
Mopani Copper Mines Plc	14,927,500,000		Based on US$853m (2021 ZMW spot conversion) in extraction at Mopani Copper Mines.
Konkola Copper Mines Plc	11,978,400,000		Based on US$1,085m (2019 ZMW Average year ended 31 March 2019) in operations
Copperbelt Energy Corporation	5,985,000,000		Based on US$342m (2021 ZMW spot conversion) revenues.
Puma Energy Zambia	5,841,402,000		
Zambia Sugar	4,989,980,000		
Zambeef Products	4,974,351,000		
Zambia National Commercial Bank	3,511,658,000		
Zambian Breweries	3,068,959,000		
Metal Fabricators of Zambia	2,424,306,000		
Chilanga Cement	2,113,725,000		

== See also ==
- Economy of Zambia
- List of banks in Zambia
- Lusaka Stock Exchange
- Taxation in Zambia
- High Net Worth Individuals in Zambia
- Bank of Zambia
- Zambian kwacha
