= Economy of Zambia =

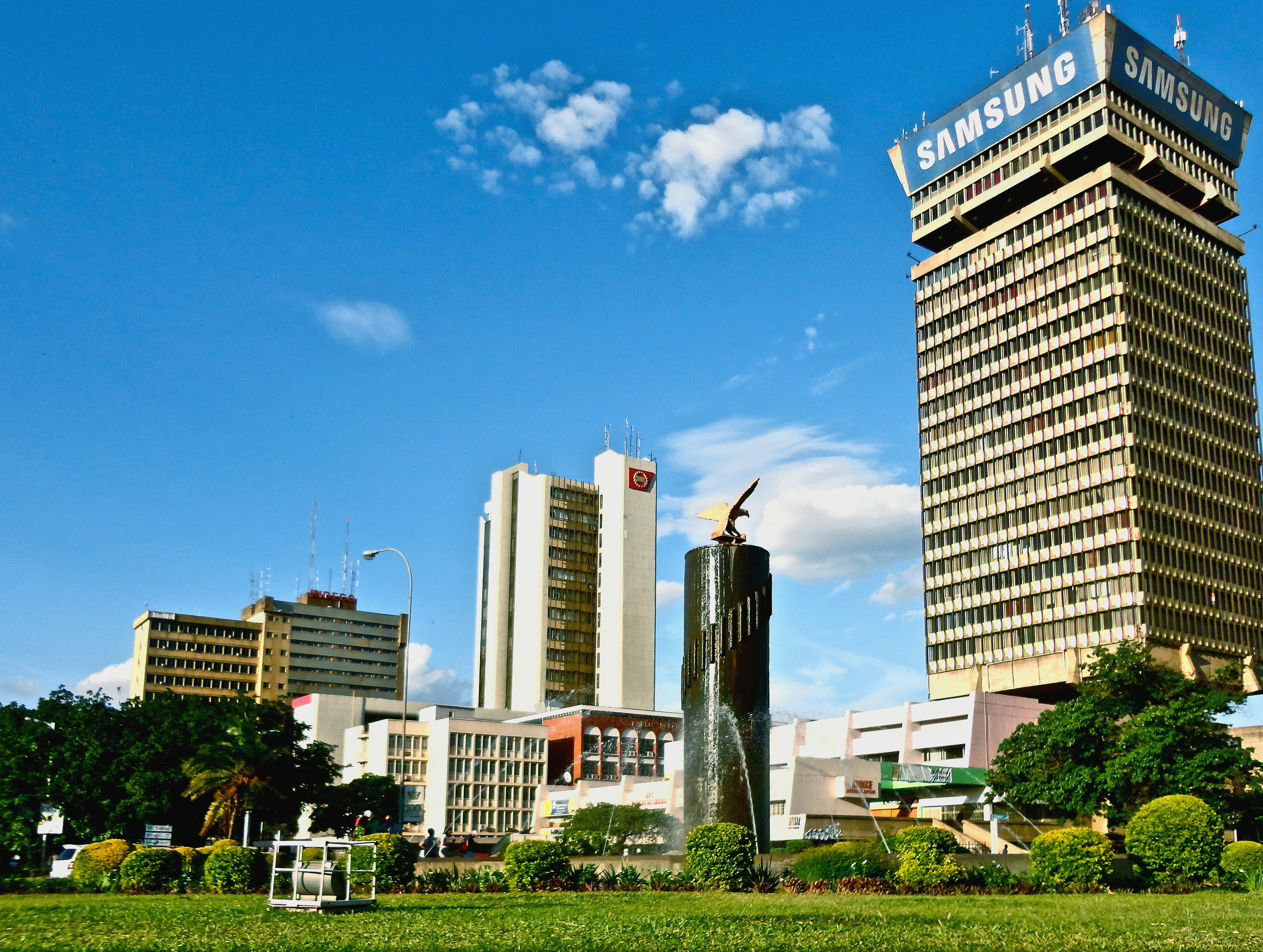
- Lusaka is the capital and largest financial district of Zambia
- Currency: Zambian kwacha (ZMW)
- Fiscal year: calendar years
- Trade organisations: AU, AfCFTA (signed), WTO, SADC, COMESA
- Country group: Least developed; Lower-middle income economy

Statistics
- Population: ▲19,473,125 (2021)
- GDP: ▲$28.91 billion (nominal; 2025); ▲$98.16 billion (PPP; 2025)
- GDP rank: 111th (nominal; 2025); 103rd (PPP; 2025)
- GDP growth: 6.2% (2025)
- GDP per capita: ▲$1,330 (nominal; 2025); ▲$4,520 (PPP; 2025)
- GDP per capita rank: 164th (nominal; 2025); 156th (PPP; 2025)
- GDP per capita growth: 0.9% (2024)
- GDP by sector: agriculture: 8.6%; industry: 31.3%; services: 60%; (2015 est.)
- Inflation (CPI): 9.4% (January 2026 est.)
- Population below national poverty line: 60.5% (2010)
- Human Development Index: ▲0.595 medium (2025) (154th); ▼0.361 low IHDI (2025)
- Labour force: 6.906 million(2015)
- Labour force by occupation: agriculture: 54.8%, industry: 9.9%, services: 35.3% (2017)
- Unemployment: 5.9% (2023)
- Main industries: copper, nickel, cobalt, manganese & gold mining and processing, construction, foodstuffs, beverages, chemicals, textiles, fertilizer, horticulture

External
- Exports: 333.4 billion Kwacha ($13.314 billion) (2025 est)
- Export goods: copper, nickel, zinc, cobalt, gold, electricity, gemstones, fertilizer, tobacco, sulphur, flowers, cotton, raw sugar, soyabean meal
- Main export partners: Canada ▲23.3%; Switzerland ▼15.2%; Singapore ▲12.8%; DR Congo ▼10.9%; China ▼7.8%; United Arab Emirates ▼7.7%; (2025)
- Imports: 330.3 billion Kwacha ($13.171 billion) (2025 est)
- Import goods: machinery, transportation equipment, petroleum products, electricity; foodstuffs, clothing
- Main import partners: South Africa ▼22.2%; China ▲18.9%; United Arab Emirates ▲9.1%; India ▼4.2%; Tanzania ▼3.7%; Japan ▲3.2%; (2025)

Public finance
- Government debt: $17.00 billion (December 2021)
- Foreign reserves: ▲$6.5 billion | ▲ ≈ZMW 117.26 bn (March 2026 est.)
- Revenue: ZMW 150 billion (2024)
- Spending: ZMW 192 billion (2024)
- Credit rating: Standard & Poor's: B+ (Domestic); B+ (Foreign); B+ (T&C Assessment)
- All values, unless otherwise stated, are in US dollars.

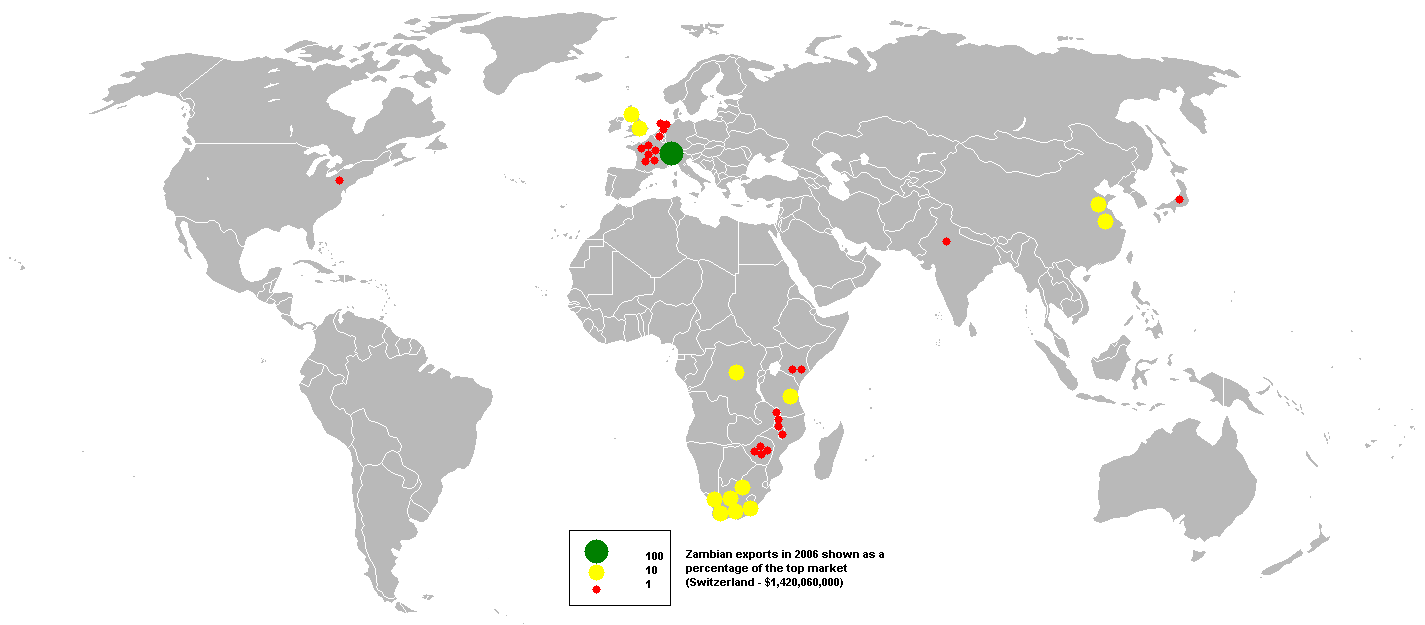
Zambian exports in 2006

Zambia has an emerging economy. It is a developing country, and it achieved middle-income status in 2011. Through the first decade of the 21st century, the Zambian economy was one of the fastest-growing economies in Africa, and its capital, Lusaka, the fastest-growing city in the Southern African Development Community (SADC). Zambia's economic performance has stalled in recent years due to declining copper prices, significant fiscal deficits, and energy shortages. The economy has been reliant on mineral extraction since the 1920s, in particular copper.

Upon achieving independence, Zambia had a higher GDP per capita than almost all sub-Saharan African countries. Over the subsequent decades, Zambia's economy contracted, in part due to declining copper prices. Since the 2000s, Zambia's economy has been growing. As of 2019, Zambia's GDP per capita (current international dollars) stands at $1,305.00.

Zambia is one of Sub-Saharan Africa's most urbanized countries. About one-half of the country's 16 million people are concentrated in a few urban zones strung along the major transportation corridors, while rural areas are under-populated. Copper and cobalt are among Zambia's main exports, while non-traditional exports include cotton, coffee, fresh flowers, burley tobacco, gemstones and maize (corn). Zambia is eligible to export duty-free goods to the United States under the African Growth and Opportunity Act (AGOA); the Act allows eligible countries from sub-Saharan Africa to export over 6,400 goods to the United States.

Copper output has increased steadily since 2004, due to higher copper prices and the opening of new mines. The maize harvest was again good in 2005, helping boost GDP and agricultural exports. Cooperation continues with international bodies on programs to reduce poverty, including a new lending arrangement with the IMF in the second quarter of 2004.

== History ==
=== Economic policies soon after independence (1964–1967) ===
GDP per capita development of Zambia, since 1950

The British South Africa Company (BSAC, originally set up by the British imperialist Cecil Rhodes) retained commercial assets and mineral rights that it acquired from a concession signed with the Litunga of Barotseland in 1892 (the Lochner Concession). Only by threatening to expropriate the BSAC, on the eve of independence, did the incoming Zambian government manage to get the BSAC to relinquish the mineral rights. The Federation's government assigned roles to each of the three territories: Southern Rhodesia was assigned the responsibility of providing managerial and administrative skills; Northern Rhodesia provided copper revenues; and Nyasaland provided the Black labour.

After independence, Zambia instituted a program of national development plans, under the direction of a National Commission for Development Planning: the Transitional Development Plan (1964–66) was followed by the First National Development Plan (1966–71). These two plans, which provided for major investment in infrastructure and manufacturing, were largely implemented and were generally successful. This was not true for subsequent plans.

=== The Mulungushi Economic Reforms (1968) ===
A major switch in the structure of Zambia's economy came with the Mulungushi Reforms of April 1968: the government declared its intention to acquire equity holdings (usually 51% or more) in a number of key foreign-owned firms, to be controlled by a parastatal conglomerate named the Industrial Development Corporation (INDECO). By January 1970, Zambia had acquired majority holding in the Zambian operations of the two major foreign mining corporations, the Anglo American Corporation and the Rhodesia Selection Trust (RST); the two became the Nchanga Consolidated Copper Mines (NCCM) and Roan Consolidated Mines (RCM), respectively. The Zambian government then created a new parastatal body, the Mining Development Corporation (MINDECO). The Finance and Development Corporation (FINDECO) allowed the Zambian government to gain control of insurance companies and building societies. However, foreign-owned banks (such as Barclays, Standard Chartered and Grindlays) successfully resisted takeover. In 1971, INDECO, MINDECO, and FINDECO were brought together under an omnibus parastatal, the Zambia Industrial and Mining Corporation (ZIMCO), to create one of the largest companies in sub-Saharan Africa, with the country's president, Kenneth Kaunda as chairman of the board. The management contracts under which day-to-day operations of the mines had been carried out by Anglo American and RST were ended in 1973. In 1982 NCCM and RCM were merged into the giant Zambia Consolidated Copper Mines Ltd (ZCCM).

In 1973 a massive increase in the price of oil was followed by a slump in copper prices in 1975, resulting in a diminution of export earnings. In 1973 the price of copper accounted for 95% of all export earnings; this halved in value on the world market in 1975. By 1976 Zambia had a balance-of-payments crisis, and rapidly became massively indebted to the International Monetary Fund (IMF). The Third National Development Plan (1978–83) had to be abandoned as crisis management replaced long-term planning.

By the mid-1980s Zambia was one of the most indebted nations in the world, relative to its gross domestic product (GDP). The IMF was insisting that the Zambian government should introduce programs aimed at stabilizing the economy and restructuring it to reduce dependence on copper. The proposed measures included: the ending of price controls; devaluation of the kwacha (Zambia's currency); cut-backs in government expenditure; cancellation of subsidies on food and fertilizer; and increased prices for farm produce. Kaunda's removal of food subsidies caused massive increases in the prices of basic foodstuffs; the country's urbanized population rioted in protest. In desperation, Kaunda broke with the IMF in May 1987 and introduced a New Economic Recovery Programme in 1988. However, this did not help him and he eventually moved toward a new understanding with the IMF in 1989. In 1990 Kaunda was forced to make a major policy about-face: he announced the intention to partially privatize the parastatals. Time, however, was running out for him. Like many African independence leaders Kaunda tried to hang on to power but unlike many he called multiparty elections and lost them to the Movement for Multiparty Democracy (MMD) and abided by the results. Kaunda left office with the inauguration of MMD leader Frederick Chiluba as president on 2 November 1991.

=== Chiluba's economic reforms (1991–2000) ===
Zambia's Economic System of Government is Unitary because of that the Frederick Chiluba government (1991–2001), which came to power after democratic multi-party elections in November 1991, was committed to extensive economic reform.

Zambia's economic transformation into a free market system began toward the end of 1991 following a change of government. To tackle a serious economic crisis, the government agreed to introduce substantial economic reforms to secure much-needed loans from the World Bank and IMF.

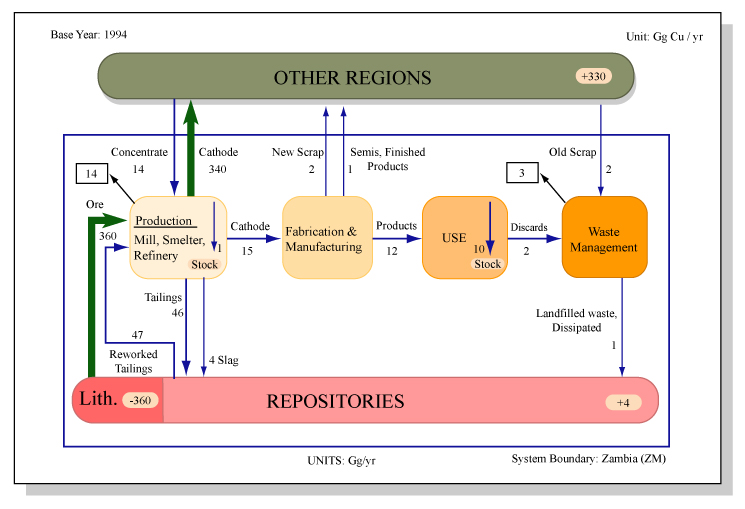
Zambia’s Copper Cycle: One Year Stocks and Flows, 1994.

One of the greatest challenges was the privatization of the country's copper mines, Zambia's prime export earner. The government privatised many state industries, and maintained positive real interest rates. Exchange controls were eliminated and free market principles endorsed. It remains to be seen whether the Mwanawasa government will follow a similar path of implementing economic reform and undertaking further privatization. Zambia has yet to address issues such as reducing the size of the public sector, which still represents 44% of total formal employment, and improving Zambia's social sector delivery systems.

After the government privatized the giant parastatal mining company Zambian Consolidated Copper Mines (ZCCM), donors resumed balance-of-payment support. The final transfer of ZCCM's assets occurred on March 31, 2000. Although balance-of-payment payments are not the answer to Zambia's long-term debt problems, it will in the short term provide the government some breathing room to implement further economic reforms. The government has, however, spent much of its foreign exchange reserves to intervene in the exchange rate mechanism. To continue to do so, however, would jeopardize Zambia's debt relief. Zambia qualified for HIPC debt relief in 2000, contingent upon the country meeting certain performance criteria, and this should offer a long-term solution to Zambia's debt situation.

=== 2001–2010 ===
On 2 January 2002, MMD's Levy Mwanawasa won the presidential election which many observers claimed had actually been won by the opposition. In January 2003, the Zambian Government informed the International Monetary Fund and World Bank that it wished to renegotiate some of the agreed performance criteria calling for privatization of the Zambia National Commercial Bank and the national telephone and electricity utilities.

Foreign investors liked Mwanawasa, owing partly to his anti-corruption drive. During his presidency, Zambia received foreign investment. The main driver of economic growth was minerals. Mwanawasa's policies helped to lower inflation to single digits in 2006, a record the country had not seen in over 25 years, and spread some benefits to the poor. Tourists and white farmers diverted from Zimbabwe and helped the Zambian economy. The policies turned the Zambian town of Livingstone, near Victoria Falls, into a tourist hub. Zambia received a relatively large amount of aid and debt relief because of liberalisation and Mwanawasa's efforts. Overall, economic growth increased to about 6% per year.

After Mwanawasa suffered a stroke while attending an African Union summit in Egypt on 29 June 2008, Rupiah Banda became acting president and subsequently President. With divisions within the MMD, Banda promised to "unite the party and the entire nation" and to "continue implementing [Mwanawasa's] programs". After taking office, however, Banda dismantled much of the anti-corruption effort put into place by his predecessor, Mwanawasa. This, compounded with the effects of the Great Recession, led to a sustained period of increased inflation.

=== 2011–2020 ===
In September 2011, the social democrat, Michael Sata led the Patriotic Front (PF) to victory with a vow to improve conditions for their Zambian employees. Though known to previously oppose Chinese investment, he declared his change in perspective prior to his election victory. Sata died on 28 October 2014 and was succeeded by Edgar Lungu. The period, saw an infrastructure boom with the development of the Kafue Gorge Lower Power Station, two multi-purpose stadiums, Levy Mwanawasa Stadium and National Heroes Stadium, expansions of the Kenneth Kaunda International Airport, the Harry Mwanga Nkumbula International Airport and the Simon Mwansa Kapwepwe International Airport, and the Pave Zambia 2000 project intended to create and repair major urban roads countrywide.

Unfortunately this came at a huge debt cost that slowed the economy and compounded by corruption and the COVID-19 pandemic resulted in weak GDP growth and a recession in 2019 and 2020 respectively. Zambia's GDP had shrunk from US$29 billion to US$19 billion and its debt grew from 16% to 140% of GDP from 2010 through 2020. In November 2020, Zambia became Africa's first coronavirus-era default when it opted to bow out of a US$42.5 million eurobond repayment.

=== From 2021 ===
In August 2021, the Zambian populace ushered in a new government with a promise for jobs growth. Hakainde Hichilema's United Party for National Development (UPND) government delivered an ambitious budget that included an increase in the Constituency Development Fund (CDF) from ZMW 1.6 million (US$91 thousand) to ZMW 25.7 million (US$1.5 million) for each of Zambia's 156 constituencies and its decentralization in release to these constituencies. The expectation is that this will generate jobs growth in addition to the government's targeted employment of 30,000 new teachers and 11,200 health workers. In mid July 2022, the government recruited 30,496 Teachers. At the end of July 2022, 11,276 health workers, being doctors, nurses and ancillary staff such as drivers were recruited by the government.

With a push for Zambia to be able to produce 3 million tonnes of Copper per annum within the next 10 years, the government reintroduced the deductibility of mineral royalty for corporate income tax assessment purposes. The results of these policy changes are yet to be seen.

At the 2022 IMF-World Bank Spring Meetings, the World Bank announced it would fund projects worth US$560 million in Zambia in 2022.

In July 2022, to address its debt challenges, the Zambian government engaged creditors of undisbursed loans to facilitate the formal cancellation of loans estimated to be about US$2.0 billion. Projects that were already ongoing would now be financed through government revenues.

In early August 2022, the Zambia Development Agency, a quasi-government institution under the Ministry of Commerce, Trade and Industry reported that it had recorded numerous investment pledges worth US$3.8 billion in the first half to 2022 targeting the agriculture, tourism, construction and mining sectors with a potential job market of 19,000.

In October 2021, to spur economic development, Zambia took measures to promote local development in its ambitious 2022 national budget. The Government announced an unprecedented constituency development fund (CDF) increment from ZMW 1.6 million (U$91,000) to ZMW 25.7 million (U$1.5million) for each constituency taking the total development fund injection into the local communities from ZMW 250 million (U$14.2 million) to ZMW 4 billion (U$228.4 million). After winning a crucial Staff-Level IMF Deal, in early December 2021, Zambia went on to cut fuel subsidies later that month as a key step in seeking U$1.4 billion from the IMF.

At the end of July 2022, the Official Creditor Committee co-chaired by China and France, and vice chaired by South Africa agreed to provide the financing assurances under the G20 Common Framework for debt treatment that Zambia had been waiting for to secure final approval from the International Monetary Fund for a US$1.4 billion bailout under the Extended Credit Facility. In early August 2022, at the symposium on the midyear budget and economic performance and the 2023 to 2025 medium term budget plan, Zambia's Minister of Finance and National Planning, Dr. Situmbeko Musokotwane said the IMF board was expected to meet at the end of August 2022 to approve the loan programme.

On 31 August 2022, the International Monetary Fund (IMF) board approved a US$1.3 billion extended credit facility to help Zambia restore fiscal stability.

In June 2023, Zambia reached an agreement in principle to restructure US$6.3 billion of debt with bilateral lenders. In October 2023, Zambia agreed a memorandum of understanding (MoU) with its bilateral creditors on restructuring about $6.3 billion of debt. Following the signing of the MoU, the terms would be implemented through bilateral agreements with each member of the OCC (Official Creditor Committee).

In March 2024, Zambia struck an 76.5 billion kwacha (US$3.0 billion) restructuring deal with bondholders. The agreement included important concessions from the Bondholders, while providing the required debt relief to the Government. Under the agreement, Bondholders would forego approximately 21.4 billion kwacha (US$840 million) of their claims, and provide cash flow relief of approximately 63.8 billion kwacha (US$2.5 billion) during the IMF programme period.

==== Public-Private Dialogue Forum (PPDF) ====
In April 2022, Zambia launched a mechanism aimed at unlocking the potential of the private sector as a driver of economic development and job creation. The Public-Private Dialogue Forum (PPDF) is meant to act as a structured mechanism for interactions between the public and the private sector in tackling bottlenecks that have hindered the growth of the private sector.

==== European Union (EU)–Zambia Economic Forum ====
In May 2022, the inaugural European Union (EU)-Zambia Economic Forum was launched in Lusaka by President Hakainde Hichilema under the theme ‘Economic transformation through green growth’. It was a high-level event that brought together entrepreneurs, experts, financial institutions, innovators, and policy decision-makers from Zambia, the EU and representatives of its 27 member states. Additional special guests included the EU Commissioner for Agriculture Janusz Wojciechowski and the commissioner for Trade and Industry of the African Union Commission, Albert M. Muchanga. The forum was launched as a platform with a view to promoting employment, value addition and increased trade through business-to-business (B2B) and business-to-government (B2G) collaboration and economic synergies for EU and Zambian businesses.

==== UK–Zambia Green Growth Compact ====
In November 2021, the Zambian and British government signed the UK-Zambia Green Growth Compact, an agreement expected to boost the United Kingdom's investment into Zambia by £1.0 billion (US$1.26 billion) with a focus on job creation and green energy production. In May 2022, the British High Commissioner to Zambia Nicholas Woolley, indicated that the British government had set aside the £1.0 billion to be spent over the next 5 years with £100.0 million (US$126.0 million) targeted for funding Small Medium Entrepreneurs (SMEs) and £500.0 million (US$629.9 million) for investment in renewable energy.

==== World Bank Support ====
In July 2022, the World Bank approved US$155.0 million in International Development Assistance for Social Cash Transfer to mitigate the high cost of living pressures in Zambia and a further US$27.0 million credit facility to support the government's development programs.

In July 2022, the World Bank approved a further US$665.0 million to fund projects in Zambia to spur economic recovery and growth and also lighten the debt burden. Through 2032, the World Bank plans to support Zambia with new financing of over US$2.0 billion in the form of concessional loans.

In late October 2022, the World Bank approved US$275.0 million concessional loan targeted at fiscal stabilization and accelerated economic programs. Financing was provided by the World Bank's International Development Association (IDA).

==== African Export-Import Bank (Afreximbank) Support ====
In July 2022, the African Export-Import Bank President Benedict Oramah, whilst in Lusaka Zambia, announced that the bank would put up an investment of about US$250 million for Zambia's first-ever Battery Electric Vehicle (BEV) manufacturing plant.

==== EAC-SADC-COMESA Free Trade Area ====
In July 2022, during the 4th Mid-Year Coordination Meeting of the African Union, Regional Economic Communities and Regional Mechanisms in Lusaka, Zambia, the three regional blocs, East African Community (EAC), Southern African Development Community (SADC), and Common Market for Eastern and Southern Africa (COMESA) agreed to have a tripartite ministers' summit to fast track the finalization of the border control-free travel and free movement of goods and services area by the end of 2022.

==== Zambia-China Trade and Investment Forum ====
In September 2022, Zambia and China launched the inaugural trade and investment forum aimed at unlocking trade and investment potential between the two countries. The event also saw the signing of an Exchange Letter of the Duty Free Treatment for Zambian products corresponding to 98-percent of the tariff lines by Finance Minister Situmbeko Musokotwane and Chinese Ambassador to Zambia Du Xiao.

==== Zambia-China bilateral trade growth ====
In mid-September 2023, President Hakainde Hichilema met with the General Secretary of the Chinese Communist Party, Xi Jinping in Beijing, China where they witnessed the signing of over 15 MOUs amounting to a potential investment of about ZMW 62.3 billion kwacha (US$3.0 billion) by China into Zambia and the leaders also agreed to increase the use of local currencies in trade between the two countries. One of the MOUs signed during Mr. Hichilema's visit to China was with the international telecoms manufacturer ZTE to construct and open a smartphone manufacturing plant in Zambia. In late-September 2023, China Nonferrous Metal Mining Group (CNMC) unveiled plans to inject an additional ZMW 27.0 billion kwacha (US $1.3 billion) into Zambia from 2023 through 2028, spanning the mining, energy, education and technology economic sectors.

==== U.S.-Zambia Business Summit ====
In October 2022, more than 50 United States and Zambian business and government leaders gathered in Lusaka for the two-day inaugural U.S.-Zambia Business Summit at the Intercontinental Hotel. Representatives from the U.S. Trade and Development Agency, U.S. International Development Finance Corporation also attended the Summit. The Summit focused on promoting Zambia as one of the most attractive business environments for investment on the African continent.

African Continental Free Trade Area (AfCFTA) Digital Trade Forum

In May 2025, Zambia hosted the inaugural, African Continental Free Trade Area (AfCFTA) Digital Trade Forum in Lusaka. The Digital Trade Forum, bringing together policymakers and business leaders from across Africa, aimed to develop practical strategies for implementing the AfCFTA's digital commerce provisions.

Invest Zambia International Conference

In July 2025, Zambia Launched the inaugural “Invest in Zambia International Conference” to drive Economic transformation. The event saw the signing of multiple MOUs and deals worth over 46.6 billion kwacha (US$2 billion) securing significant investments in Zambia's energy and agricultural sectors.

== Sectors ==
=== Mining ===
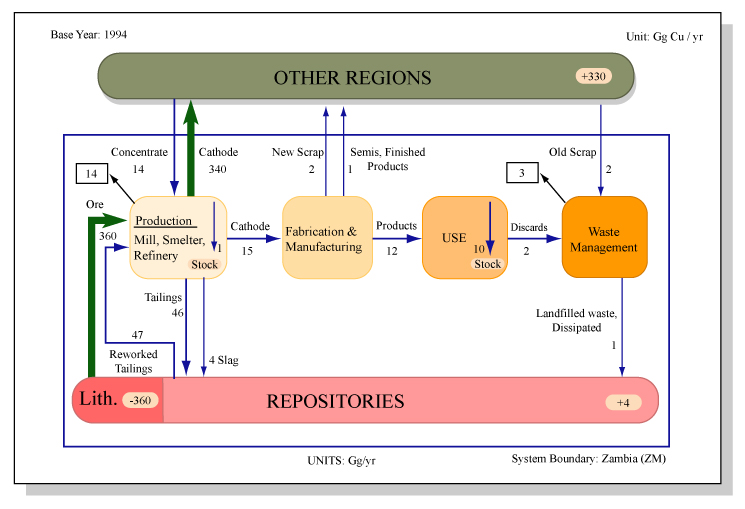
Zambia’s Copper Cycle: One Year Stocks and Flows, 1994.

In 2019, the country was the world's 7th largest producer of copper.

The Zambian economy has historically been based on the copper-mining industry. The industrialization of the copper industry is owed partly to Frederick Russell Burnham, the famous American scout who worked for Cecil Rhodes. By 1998, however, output of copper had fallen to a low of 228,000 tonnes, continuing a 30-year decline in output due to lack of investment, and until recently, low copper prices and uncertainty over privatization. In 2001, the first full year of a privatized industry, Zambia recorded its first year of increased productivity since 1973. The future of the copper industry in Zambia was thrown into doubt in January 2002, when investors in Zambia's largest copper mine announced their intention to withdraw their investment. However, surging copper prices from 2004 to the present day rapidly rekindled international interest in Zambia's copper sector with a new buyer found for KCCM and massive investments in expanding capacity launched. China has become a major investor in the Zambian copper industry, and in February 2007, the two countries announced the creation of a Chinese-Zambian economic partnership zone around the Chambishi copper mine.

Today copper mining is central to the economic prospects for Zambia and covers 85% of all the country's exports, but concerns remain that the economy is not diversified enough to cope with a collapse in international copper prices.

Production of Mineral Raw Materials 2016-2024
Year	Copper (MT)	% Growth of Cu	Cobalt (MT)	Gold (kg)	Nickel (MT)	Zinc (MT)	Manganese (MT)	Coal(MT)	Emeralds(kg)	Beryllium (kg)	Sulfur (elemental & industrial) (MT)
2016	▲774,290	▲8.82%	▲5,276	▲4.610	0		▲27,500	▲129,470	▲74,742	▲5,000	▲363,000
2017	▲799,329	▲3.23%	▼2,649	▼4,373	0		▲39,900	▲208,608	▼65,243	▼4,000	▲679,500
2018	▲861,946	▲7.83%	▼1,766	▼4,044	0		▲37,800	▲344,717	▼18,869	▲7,000	▲947,800
2019	▼796,430	▼-7.60%	▼1,271	▲4.522	▲1,110		▼15,904	▲361,648	▲23,705	7,000	▲960,300
2020	▲882,061	▲10.75%	▼367	▼3,994	▲3,226		▲46,515	▲446,153	▼7,653	▼2,000	▼917,300
2021	▼802,967	▼-8.97%	▼247	▼2,432	▲3,834		▲132,241	▲663,345	▲12,871		
2022	▼763,287	▼-4.94%	▲251	▼1,515	▲4,059		▲161,611	▲781,466	▲20,703		
2023	▼682,431	▼-10.59%	▲1,467	▲1,945	▲6,169		▲171,066	▲915,187	▼14,814		
2024	▲771,036	▲12.98%	▼1,310	▲3.159	▲19,137	▲52,105	▼119,912	▼769,531	▲31,683		
2025	▲890,345	▲15.47%	-	▲3.483	▼17,821	▲65,000	▼53,265	▲985,819	▲35,000		

In January 2013, the Zambia Environmental Management Agency (ZEMA) approved 27 mining and exploration licences, with more rumoured to be confirmed.

Zambia is the world's second biggest producer of emeralds, with its Kafubu River area deposits (Kagem Mines) about 45 km (28 mi) southwest of Kitwe responsible for 20% of the world's production of gem-quality stones in 2004. In the first half of 2011, the Kagem Mines produced 3.74 tons of emeralds. In April 2022, Gemfields, the majority owner in the mine, recorded a record U$42.3 million at a sold out March/April auction and since 2009, Kagem-sourced gemstones (emerald and beryl) have netted Gemfields revenue totaling U$792 million with the proceeds fully repatriated to Kagem in Zambia, with all royalties due to the Zambian government paid on the full sales prices achieved at auctions.

Kagem Mines Performance
Year	Premium Emerald (carats)	Emerald and Beryl ('000 carats)
2019	▲204,600	▲36,300
2020	▼133,900	▼9,400
2021	▲230,500	▲32,000
2022	▲259,500	▲37,241
2023	▼156,700	▼30,153

Rich deposits of Uranium have been discovered in some parts of Zambia. In 2007, the Zambian government sought scrutiny and guidance from the International Atomic Energy Agency (IAEA) on its developed guidelines to regulate the mining of uranium in the country. In 2008, deposits were found in Kaputa District, Northern Province. Albidon Zambia Limited also confirmed the presence of high-grade uranium mineralisation at its Njame east project near Chirundu. In the Southern Province, 31 km North of Siavonga, and north of Lake Kariba, there are 5 main Uranium Deposits: Mutanga, Dibwe, Dibwe East, Njame, and Gwabe explored under The Mutanga Uranium Project. The Canadian Toronto Stock Exchange (TSX) listed GoviEx Uranium Inc acquired 100% of the Mutanga Project also known as the Kariba Uranium Project in 2016. In March 2022, GoviEx announced that the Project is forecast to start production in 2027 and could be the lowest capital intensive uranium project in Africa.

Lumwana Mining Company Limited (LMC) who had embarked on uranium exploration in 2007 in Solwezi District are currently stock piling uranium that the firm is getting as a by-product of Copper from its operations as they are yet to obtain a uranium license. The mining of uranium in Zambia is monitored by the Zambia Environmental Management Agency (ZEMA).

See Also:

- Munali Nickel Mine estimated development cost U$180 million in 2007
- Enterprise Nickel Project estimated development cost U$275 million

=== Agriculture ===
The agriculture sector represented 2.7% GDP in 2019. Agriculture accounted for 85% of total employment (formal and informal) for 2000. Maize (corn) is the principal cash crop as well as the staple food. Other important crops include soybean, cotton, sugar, sunflower seeds, wheat, sorghum, pearl millet, cassava, tobacco and various vegetable and fruit crops. Floriculture is a growth sector, and agricultural non-traditional exports now rival the mining industry in foreign exchange receipts. Zambia has the potential for significantly increasing its agricultural output; currently, less than 20% of its arable land is cultivated. In the past, the agriculture sector suffered from low producer prices, difficulties in availability and distribution of credit and inputs, and the shortage of foreign exchange.

Major Crop Production Statistics and Growth
Year	Maize (MT)	Cassava (MT)	Sugarcane (MT)	Wheat (MT)	Soya Beans (MT)	Sweet Potato(MT)	Cotton (MT)	Groundnuts (MT)	Millet(MT)	Vegetables (MT)	Tobacco(US$)
2010	▲2,800,000	▲1,151,000	▲3,700,000	▼172,256	▼111,887	▲252,867	▲107,000	▲164,602	▲47,997	▲364,326	▲147,201,182
2011	▲3,020,000	▼1,132,150	▲4,200,000	▲237,332	▲116,539	▼146,614	▲131,298	▲279,000	▼41,602	▼335,000	▲153,242,976
2012	▼2,850,000	▼1,107,954	▲4,300,000	▲253,522	▲203,038	▲163,484	▲269,501	▼113,026	▼28,445	▲350,000	▲163,890,992
2013	▼2,533,000	▲1,114,583	▲4,600,000	▲273,584	▲262,063	▲187,774	▲139,583	▼106,792	▼23,942	350,000	▲169,418,496
2014	▲3,351,000	▼919,497	4,600,000	▼201,504	▼214,179	▼149,355	▲120,314	▲143,591	▲30,504	▲353,586	▲179,120,836
2015	▼2,618,000	▲952,770	▼4,155,000	▲309,100	▲226,323	▼117,215	▼103,889	▼111,429	▲31,967	▲374,208	▲188,823,176
2016	▲2,873,000	▲2,222,844	▼4,083,000	▼221,644	▲267,490	▲230,248	▲111,902	▲131,562	▼29,972	▼369,542	▲198,525,516
2017	▲3,607,000	▲3,695,182	▲4,365,965	▲279,329	▲351,416	▼205,834	▼89,293	▲168,699	▲32,566	▼365,779	▲205,936,998
2018	▼2,395,000	▲4,102,300	▲4,630,000	▼171,424	▼302,720	▼183,280	▼88,219	▲181,772	▼32,278	▲369,843	▲213,838,216
2019	▼2,004,389	▼4,036,584	▲4,682,000	▼151,850	▼281,389	▼109,336	▼66,315	▼130,825	▼24,843	▼368,338	▲221,581,410
2020	▲3,387,469	▼3,931,915	▼4,827,104	▲191,620	▲296,866	▲144,706	▼41.441	▼127,172	▲45,005	▼368,003	▼185,000,000
2021	▲3,620,244	▼3,800,153	▲5,102,118	▲205,881	▲411,115	▲213,566	▼31,859	▲175,329	▼34,702	▲445,625	▼114,184,304
2022	▼2,653,805	▼3,315,611		▲277,586	▲438,679	▼162,614	▼19,375	▲180,256	▼24,224		N/A
2023	▲3,261,686	▲4,450,019		▼277,492	▲760,067	▲234,631	▲55,971	▲235,446	▲46,753		

Cut flowers and flower buds suitable for bouquets or for ornamental purposes, fresh, dried, dyed, bleached, impregnated or otherwise prepared
Year	Exports (US$)	Export Growth%	Imports (US$)
2010	▼333,520	▼ -62.05%	▼7,140
2011	▲17,364,392	▲5,106.40%	▼4,574
2012	▲23,820,333	▲37.17%	▼3,369
2013	▲32,150,400	▲34.97%	▲12,039
2014	▼13,623,771	▼ -57.64%	▼6,645
2015	▼12,326,666	▼ -9.52%	▲20,330
2016	▼10,371,243	▼ -15.86%	▲31,849
2017	▲10,531,349	▲1.54%	▼3,065
2018	▼9,371,243	▼ -6.99%	▲15,623
2019	▼8,068,641	▼ -17.61%	▲17,302
2020	▼7,051,388	▼ -12.60%	▲32,755

In 2019 Zambia produced:

- 4.7 million tons of sugarcane;
- 4 million tons of cassava (18th largest producer in the world);
- 2 million tons of maize;
- 281 thousand tons of soy;
- 153 thousand tons of tobacco (6th largest producer in the world);
- 151 thousand tons of wheat;
- 130 thousand tons of peanut;
- 109 thousand tons of sweet potato;
- 72 thousand tons of cotton;
- 6,900 tons of coffee;

In addition to other productions of other agricultural products.

Due to high demand for flour in neighboring Democratic Republic of the Congo DRC, Zambia increased Wheat production from 205,000 tonnes in 2020 to 400,000 tonnes 2021.

In July 2022, Zambia and China sealed a memorandum of understanding on soya bean meal and stevia export from Zambia to China.

=== Fisheries and Livestock ===
The Fisheries and Livestock sub-sector in Zambia contributes to employment creation, food and nutrition security, and economic growth.

Capture Fishery and Aquaculture Production
Year	Capture Fishery (MT)	% Growth of Capture Fishery	Aquaculture (MT)	% Growth of Aquaculture
2005	65,927		5,125	
2006	▼60,236	▼ -8.63%	5,125	0.00%
2007	▲73,542	▲22.09%	▼5,120	▼ -0.10%
2008	▲79,403	▲7.97%	▲5,876	▲14.77%
2009	▲84,716	▲6.69%	▼5,640	▼ -4.02%
2010	▼76,396	▼ -9.82%	▲9,535	▲69.06%
2011	▼69,364	▼ -9.20%	▲10,291	▲7.93%
2012	▲80,638	▲16.25%	▲12,988	▲26.21%
2013	▼75,187	▼ -6.76%	▲20,271	▲56.07%
2014	▲80,826	▲7.50%	▲19,281	▼ -4.88%
2015	▲83,719	▲3.58%	▲22,753	▲18.01%
2016	▲83,918	▲0.24%	▲28,669	▲26.00%
2017	▲88,075	▲4.95%	▲21,567	▼ -24.77%
2018	▲89,195	▲1.27%	▲29,565	▲37.08%
2019	▲91,342	▲2.41%	▲38,480	▲30.15%
2020	▲94,943	▲3.94%	▲45,670	▲18.69%
2021	▲95,625	▲0.72%	▲59,679	▲30.67%
2022	▲99, 928	▲4.50%	▲75,647	▲26.70%
2023	▲101,825	▲1.90%	▲76,627	▲1.30%

Livestock population 2017-2021
Year	Cattle	Sheep	Goats	Pigs	Chickens
2017	3,714,667	170,262	3,583,696	1,082,765	39,147,000
2018	▲3,927,432	▲185,105	▲4,008,197	▲1,292,287	▼39,008,000
2019	▼3,814,438	▼165,236	▼3,948,861	▲1,331,576	▲39,690,000
2020	▲3,885,336	▲174,001	▲3,957,252	▲1,166,924	▲40,438,000
2021	▲4,371,801	▲190,876	▲4,117,674	▼1,146,276	▲41,230,000
2022	▲4,698,972	▲260,560	▲4,455,860	▲1,160,842	▼30,586,024
2023	▲4,839,941	▲264,729	▲4,548,542	▲1,167,807	▲31,824,758

Livestock products 2018-2019
Year	Milk (MT)	Eggs (000)	Hides (MT)	Beef (MT)	Pork (MT)	Poultry (MT)
2018	1,686,400	1,642,693	345,549	6,103,281	555,270	5,111,098
2019	▲2,045,603	▲1,744,047	▲369,357	▲6,763,045	▲595,472	▲5,537,874

In livestock, Zambia produced, in 2019: 191 thousand tons of beef; 50 thousand tons of chicken meat; 34 thousand tons of pork; 453 million liters of cow's milk, among others.

=== Energy ===
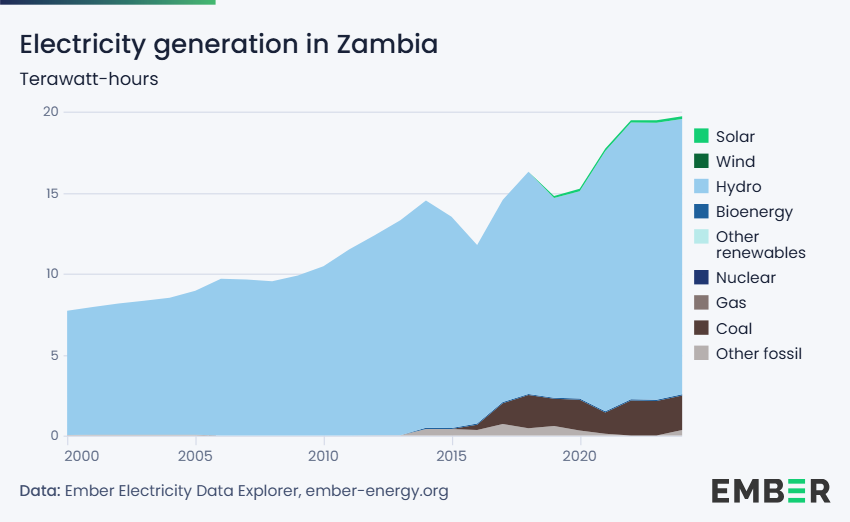
Electricity generation in Zambia in terawatt-hours

Energy in Zambia is the production of energy and electricity, for consumption or export. The Energy Regulation Board (ERB) has the mandate to balance and safeguard the interests of all energy stakeholders. The Energy policy is as guided by the Energy Regulation Act No. 12 of 2019, the Electricity Act No. 11 of 2019 and the Rural Electrification Act No.20 of 2003.

==== Electricity ====
Electricity Generation in Zambia (2000-2021)
Year	Total Generation (GWh)	Hydropower (GWh)	Coal Power (GWh)	Solar Power (GWh)	Oil (GWh)	Other Renewables (bioelectricity) (GWh)
2000	7,760	7,670	-	-	70	20
2001	▲7,900	▲7,810	-	-	70	▲20
2002	▲8,110	▲8,020	-	-	▲80	▼10
2003	▲8,260	▲8,170	-	-	80	10
2004	▲8,460	▲8,380	-	-	▼70	10
2005	▲8,880	▲8,790	-	-	▲80	10
2006	▲9,660	▲9,570	-	-	80	10
2007	▼9,600	▼9,530	-	-	▼60	10
2008	▼9,490	▼9,430	-	-	▼40	▲20
2009	▲9,860	▲9,780	-	-	▲50	▲30
2010	▲10,410	▲10.330	-	-	50	30
2011	▲11,450	▲11,370	-	-	50	30
2012	▲12,310	▲12,230	-	-	50	30
2013	▲13,230	▲13,150	-	-	50	30
2014	▲14,350	▲13,900	-	-	▲340	▲110
2015	▼14,000	▼12,910	▲290	-	▲700	▼100
2016	▼11,610	▼10,910	▲460	-	▼180	▼60
2017	▲14,320	▲12,370	▲1,140	-	▲660	▲150
2018	▼15,980	▲13,560	▲1,420	-	▲820	▲180
2019	▲16,010	▲13,670	▼1,300	▲120	▲750	▼170
2020	▼15,980	▲13,670	▼1,270	▲150	▼730	▼160
2021	▲17,584					
2022	▲19,399					

Electrical Energy Export Earnings
Month	ZMW	Month	ZMW	Month	ZMW	Month	ZMW	Month	ZMW	Month	ZMW
Jan-21	▲259,900,000	Jan-22	▼-	Jan-23	▲590,300,000	Jan-24	▲877,700,000	Jan-25	▼-	Jan-26	▼310,500,000
Feb-21	▼-	Feb-22	-	Feb-23	▼551,600,000	Feb-24	▼748,000,000	Feb-25	-	Feb-26	▲415,600,000
Mar-21	▲299,900,000	Mar-22	▲299,900,000	Mar-23	▲638.600,000	Mar-24	▲802,600,000	Mar-25	▲521,900,000	Mar-26	▼335,100,000
Apr-21	▼294,100,000	Apr-22	▼-	Apr-23	▼600,400,000	Apr-24	▼668,400,000	Apr-25	▼370,900,000	Apr-26	▲343,300,000
May-21	▲384,400,000	May-22	-	May-23	▲622,800,000	May-24	▼623,100,000	May-25	▲463,000,000	May-26	▲628.000,000
Jun-21	▼-	Jun-22	-	Jun-23	▼587,700,000	Jun-24	▲625,500,000	Jun-25	▼443,400,000	Jun-26	
Jul-21	▲210,600,000	Jul-22	-	Jul-23	▲668.800,000	Jul-24	▼538,200,000	Jul-25	-	Jul-26	
Aug-21	▲290,500,000	Aug-22	-	Aug-23	▲698.400,000	Aug-24	▲621,700,000	Aug-25	▲485,300,000	Aug-26	
Sep-21	▼-	Sep-22	▲696,800,000	Sep-23	▼678,800,000	Sep-24	▼502,400,000	Sep-25	▲995,300,000	Sep-26	
Oct-21	-	Oct-22	▼560,200,000	Oct-23	▼664,000,000	Oct-24	▼426,700,000	Oct-25	▼444,000,000	Oct-26	
Nov-21	-	Nov-22	▲642,100,000	Nov-23	▲901,300,000	Nov-24	▲444,200,000	Nov-25	▲576,600,000	Nov-26	
Dec-21	▲223,100,000	Dec-22	▼583,900,000	Dec-23	▼826,500,000	Dec-24	▼396,200,000	Dec-25	▼401,000,000	Dec-26	

In 2019, Zambia generated a total of 15,013GWh of Energy. 12,427GWh was Renewable and 2,586 GWh was non-renewable. Over 99% of the Renewable energy component was Hydro electricity.

With a view to diversifying the power generation profile, Zambia increased its Solar Power generation Capacity in 2019.

In March 2019, the 54MW Bangweulu Solar Power Station was commissioned.

In May 2019, the 34MW Ngonye Solar Power Station was commissioned.

In July 2022, the local National utility ZESCO, announced it had achieved an electricity generation surplus of about 1,156 MW. Zambia's national generation capacity stands at 3,456.8 MW versus a peak national demand of 2,300 MW. The surplus power is to be directed to service the power supply agreements for the export of 180 MW to Namibia and 100 MW to Zimbabwe. The exportation of 100MW electricity to Zimbabwe which is set to commence in August 2022 is under a five-year contract with a condition precedent that ZESCO earns monthly income of US$6.3 million prior exporting to Zimbabwe.

The close of 2022 brought in some serious challenges to the Zambian economy, when low water levels at the Kariba Dam significantly impacted the 1080MW Kariba Hydro Power plant's output capacity and resulted in load shedding for businesses and residents across the country. This was compounded by the maintenance that was being carried out at the 300MW Maamba Coilleries Coal Fired Power Plant.

In January 2023, Zambia signed a US$2 billion dollar MOU and Joint Development Agreement (JDA) with the United Arab Emirates for the development of 2000MW of Solar Power Projects.

In April 2023, Zambia, through its state owned utility company ZESCO Limited, signed a ZMW 67 Billion (US$3.4 Billion) Power Purchase Agreement with Integrated Clean Energy Power Company of China to produce 2,400 Mega Watts of renewable energy. Implementation of the project is expected to be done in a phased manner with the first phase producing 600MW of solar energy distributed as one 300MW power plant in Central Province and another 300MW Power plant in Southern Province. The two 300MW solar power plants of phase one are expected to be connected to the National Grid by the end of 2024.

==== Petroleum ====
Zambia is a net importer of petroleum and in 2019, Oil & Mineral Fuels ranked top amongst the country's trade imports at a value of U$1.26 billion.

In January 2022, the ERB migrated from a Quarterly pricing cycle to a monthly pricing cycle to enable the local price of fuel to be more responsive to the market fundamentals namely: international oil prices and the Kwacha/US Dollar exchange rate prevailing in the month preceding the pricing decision. Further, following the UPND governments' policy decision to place INDENI Petroleum Refinery on care and maintenance, the nation moved to one type of Diesel sold on the market, and that is the imported Low Sulphur Gasoil/Diesel.

Monthly Pricing Cycle Trend (in ZMW)
Date Revised	Petrol	Low Sulphur Diesel	Source	Date Revised	Petrol	Low Sulphur Diesel	Source	Date Revised	Petrol	Low Sulphur Diesel	Source	Date Revised	Petrol	Low Sulphur Diesel	Source
16 December 2021	21.16*	22.29*		31 December 2022	▼24.49	▼26.44		1 January 2024	29.98	29.96		31 December 2024	▲34.67	32.43	
31 January 2022	▼19.84	▼18.93		31 January 2023	▲27.22	▲29.25		1 February 2024	29.98	29.96		31 January 2025	▲34.98	▲34.98	
28 February 2022	▲21.96	▲21.54		1 March 2023	▲28.52	29.25		28 February 2024	▲34.19	▲32.15		28 February 2025	34.98	▼32.54	
31 March 2022	▲26.50	▲26.22		31 March 2023	▼27.59	▼26.28		31 March 2024	▼31.12	▼28.78		31 March 2025	34.98	▼30.23	
30 April 2022	▼24.15	▼25.64		30 April 2022	27.59	▼24.64		30 April 2024	▲35.56	▲29.60		30 April 2025	▼32.14	▼27.38	
31 May 2022	▲24.95	25.64		31 May 2023	▼24.45	▼21.87		31 May 2024	35.56	▲31.11		31 May 2025	▼31.36	▼25.12	
30 June 2022	▲26.75	▲28.01		30 June 2023	▲24.93	21.87		30 June 2024	▼31.58	▼29,34		30 Jun 2025	▼28.00	▼23.13	
31 July 2022	▼23.19	▼24.87		31 July 2023	▲25.57	▲23.36		31 July 2024	▲33.47	▲30.05		31 July 2025	28.00	23.13	
31 August 2022	▼21.54	▼23.12		31 August 2023	▲29.42	▲26.88		31 August 2024	33.47	30.05		31 August 2025	▲29.18	▲25.02	
30 September 2022	▲22.74	▲26.16	**	30 September 2023	▲29.98	▲29.96		30 September 2024	▼32.70	▼28.90		30 September 2025	▲30.58	▲26.20	
31 October 2022	▲24.31	▲27.38		31 October 2023	29.98	29.96		31 October 2024	32.70	▲30.11		31 October 2025	▼30.26	▲28.30	
1 December 2022	▲25.89	27.38		1 December 2023	29.98	29.96		30 November 2024	▲33.67	▲32.43		30 November 2025	▼29.92	▼25.35	

*Final rate on quarterly price cycle.

**Excise Duty and VAT Restored.

Bulk Fuel Depots in Zambia are listed below:

Bulk Fuel Depots
Location	Capacity (million litres)	Cost US $ (ZMW Annual Average Spot Conversion)	Commissioned	Source
Chipata	7.0	US$40.0 million (ZMW 692.0 million)	2022	
Lusaka	25.0	US$24.7 million (ZMW 132.0 million)	2013	
Mansa	6.5		2021	
Mongu	6.5	US$27.4 million (ZMW 282.0 million)	2016	
Mpika	6.5	US$8.1 million (ZMW 50.0 million)	2014	
Ndola	110	N/A	1973	
Solwezi	15.5	US$7.0 million (ZMW 60.5 million)	2015	
Total	177			

Oil and Gas Pipelines (Existing and Planned Projects)
Project	Size (Length / Capacity)	JV Partners	Project Construction Start	Project Completion	Cost	Source	Note(s)
Crude Oil Refinery and Energy Eomplex	60,000 barrels per day (9,540,000 L) of Crude Oil	Fujian Xiang Xin Corporation; IDC Zambia Limited	Q3 2025	Q4 2026 (Phase 1)	25.7 Billion kwacha (USD 1.1 billion)		Beyond fuel refining, the planned energy complex will include infrastructure for liquefied petroleum gas (LPG) bottling, bitumen production, lubricant blending, and a 130-megawatt power plant, boosting Zambia's broader energy and industrial capacity.
Tazama Pipeline	1,710 km	Government of Zambia 66.70%; Government of Tanzania 33.30%	1966 (January)	1968	See Notes		54 Years Old as of 2022.; Runs from the port of Dar-es-Salaam, Tanzania, to the Indeni Energy Company in Ndola, Zambia.; Funded by Mediobanca. In 1967, Zambia and Italy credited the consortium GBP 11,070,000.00 and Tanzania and Italy credited the consortium GBP 5,542,407.00. Terms 6% paid in 15 equal annual installments paid from earnings.
Namibia-Zambia Multi-Product Petroleum and Natural Gas Pipelines Project (NAZOP)	TBA	Government of Zambia; Government of Namibia	TBA	TBA	TBA		In October 2022, Zambia and Namibia signed a memorandum of understanding (MoU) to build an oil and gas pipeline connecting the two countries.; The MoU set the intention of the two Governments to support and facilitate the implementation of the private sector-led Namibia- Zambia Multi–Product Petroleum and Natural Gas Pipelines Project (NAZOP) that is envisioned to supply 100,000 to 120,000 barrels per day.
Lobito Oil Refinery	200,000 barrels per day (32,000,000 L) of Crude Oil	Sonangol; IDC Zambia Limited; Strategic Investor(s)	TBA	Expected 2027			Zambia secured a 26% stake in Angola's Benguela (Lobito) oil refinery
Lobito–Lusaka Oil Products Pipeline	1,400 km	Sonangol; IDC Zambia Limited; Strategic Investor(s)	TBA	TBA	US$5.0 billion		Feasibility assessments are a work in progress

See also: Tazama Pipeline, Indeni Petroleum Refinery and Lobito–Lusaka Oil Products Pipeline.

In January 2023, Zambia announced plans to acquire a stake in its neighbor Angola's Lobito Oil Refinery located in Benguela Province along the Atlantic Coast. The Lobito refinery, that is set to be completed in 2026, will have the capacity to produce 200,000 barrels per day. Under the current proposal, private investors, including Zambia, will own 70% shares in the refinery, while Angola's state oil firm, Sonangol Group, will hold 30% ownership.

In September 2023, TAZAMA began constructing a 3 km pipeline to tie the Tazama Pipeline to the 6.5 million litre Mpika fuel storage depot at a cost of ZMW 31.26 million kwacha (US$1.5 million). When commissioned the pipeline is planned to divert a portion of the low sulfur diesel imported via the pipeline to the storage depot to service the Northern circuit of Zambia with long term benefits of lower fuel costs in the region. This tie-in pipeline is the first of a planned network of distribution pipelines to the other fuel storage depots in Zambia.

=== Tourism ===
Zambia's tourism revenue has been generally raised from local and international tourists visiting the Victoria Falls in Livingstone, and its associated attractions such as the Livingstone Museum and the Mosi-oa-Tunya National Park. In July 2020, the Livingstone Tourism Association reported that during the Heroes and Unity holidays the holiday site received a record number of visitors. Celebrities such as Will Smith and some Entrepreneur have visited the tourist site with the latter celebrating her £3 million nuptials in a picturesque ceremony at The Royal Livingstone Hotel by the banks of the Zambezi River.

To advance home grown tourism, in March 2021, African Eagle Hotels, a multi-national company, stated that a 2 Star and 5 Star Hotel each costing U$20 million and U$30 million would be constructed and opened at the Kasaba Bay Resort located in the Nsumbu National Park and open by 2023. In October 2021, through its national budget, the government also allocated ZMW 150 million (U$8.6 million) to further the development of Kasaba Bay, to spur tourism in the Northern Circuit of Zambia.

Tourism Statistics 1995–2024
Year	Number of Tourists	% Growth of Tourists	Receipts ('000 US$)	% of GNP
1995	163,000		--	--
1996	▲264,000	▲62.0%	--	--
1997	▲341,000	▲29.2%	29,000	0.67%
1998	▲362,000	▲6.2%	▲40,000	▲1.1%
1999	▲404,000	▲11.6%	▲53,000	▲1.6%
2000	▲457,000	▲13.1%	▲67,000	▲1.9%
2001	▲492,000	▲7.6%	▲80,000	▲2.0%
2002	▲565,000	▲14.8%	▼64,000	▼1.5%
2003	▼413,000	▼-26.9%	▲88,000	▲1.8%
2004	▲515,000	▲24.7%	▲92,000	▼1.5%
2005	▲669,000	▲29.9%	▲447,000	▲5.4%
2006	▲757,000	▲13.2%	▲506,000	▼4.0%
2007	▲897,000	▲18.5%	▲599,000	▲4.3%
2008	▼812,000	▼ -9.5%	▼542,000	▼3.0%
2009	▼710,000	▼-12.6%	▼474,000	▲3.1%
2010	▲815,000	▲14.8%	▲492,000	▼2.4%
2011	▲920,000	▲12.9%	▲555,000	2.4%
2012	▼859,000	▼ -6.6%	▼518,000	▼2.0%
2013	▲915,000	▲6.5%	▲552,000	2.0%
2014	▲947,000	▲3.5%	▲642,000	▲2.4%
2015	▼932,000	▼ -1.6%	▲660,000	▲3.1%
2016	▲956,000	▲2.6%	▲683,000	▲3.3%
2017	▲1,010,000	▲5.6%	▼653,000	▼2.5%
2018	▲1,070,000	▲5.9%	▲742,000	▲2.8%
2019	▲1,270,000	▲18.7%	▲820,000	▲3.5%
2020	▼502,000	▼-60.5%	▼420,000	▼2.3%
2021	▲554,200	▼ -0.4%	▼393,000	▼1.8%
2022	▲1,060,788	▲91.4%	N/A	N/A
2023	▲1,392,153	▲31.2%	N/A	N/A
2024	▲2,199,820	▲58.0%	N/A	N/A

=== Manufacturing ===
Manufacturing GDP at Current Prices (ZMW' million) 2020 Q1- 2024 Q4
Quarter	Q1	Q2	Q3	Q4
2020	▲5,293	▲5,556	▲7,179	▲7,605
2021	▲9,200	▲11,654	▼10,717	▲10,211
2022	▲10,677	▼9,463	▲9,600	▲11,019
2023	▼10,814	▼9,918	▲12,892	▲13,734
2024	▲13,849	▲15,131	▲17,220	▲17,753

Companies that Manufacture in Zambia
Company name	Product(s)	Source
African Explosives Zambia	Explosives	
Airumi New Energy Zambia	Car Batteries and Storage Batteries	
Bayer Seed Itaba Plant	Maize Seed	
Chilanga Cement	Cement	
Dangote Cement	Cement	
Edge Investments	Concrete	
Hitachi Construction Machinery Zambia (HCMZ)	Heavy Construction & Mining Equipment	
Kafue Steel Plant	Steel	
Kalene Hills Fruit Factory	Fruit Processing	
Kawambwa Tea Industries Limited	Tea	
Larfarge	Cement	
Metal Fabricators of Zambia (ZAMEFA)	Electric Power Cables	
Mpande Limestone	Limestone	
Mununshi Fruit Company Limited (MFCL)	Bananas	
Naipu Mining Machinery (Zambia) Company Limited	Mining Equipment	
Ndola Lime Company Limited (NLC)	Limestone	
Nitrogen Chemicals Of Zambia (NCZ)	Fertilizers	
Northern Coffee Company Limited (NCCL)	Coffee	
Powerful Diligent Veracious (PDV) Metal Steel	Steel	
Proton Electro Cables Zambia	Building Wire & Electric Cables	
Sunbird Energy	Cassava Ethanol	
Trade Kings Zambia Limited	FMCG, Steel	
Uniflex Wires and Cables Ltd	Electric Cables	
United Capital Fertilizer (UCF) Zambia Limited	Fertilizers	
VL Health Net	Pharmaceuticals	
Xiamen Better Technology Group	Car Batteries and Storage Batteries	
Yash Life Sciences	Pharmaceuticals	
Zambeef Products	Meat, dairy, eggs, animal feed, leather	
Zambian Breweries	Alcoholic Beverages	
Zambia Forestry and Forest Industries Corporation Plc (ZAFFICO)	Wood and Wood & Paper Products	
Zambia Sugar Plc	Sugar and Molasses ethanol	
Zambia National Service (ZNS) Chingola Milling Plant	Mealie Meal	
Zamtrans	Power Transformers	

Below is a table for the Composite Purchasing Managers' Index (PMI) Manufacturing Pulse in Zambia. 50 sets the benchmark, for expansion ->50 and expansion -<50.

Composite Purchasing Managers' Index (PMI)
Month / Year	Jan	Feb	Mar	Apr	May	Jun	Jul	Aug	Sep	Oct	Nov	Dec	Source
2021	▼47.70	▼47.10	▼49.70	▲50.10	▼49.70	▼49.30	▼49.80	▼49.80	▲50.30	▲51.20	▲51.80	▲51.50	
2022	▼49.90	▲50.30	▼49.60	▲50.50	▼49.80	▼49.90	▲50.50	50.00	▲50.50	▼49.00	▼49.10	▼48.30	
2023	▲50.60	▲51.30	▼46.90	▼48.70	▲51.40	▲51.20	▲51.00	▼49.20	▼48.10	▲50.60	▲50.10	▼49.60	
2024	▼49.20	▼47.30	▼48.80	▼47.70	▼49.40	▼47.90	▼49.40	▼48.30	▼45.60	▼47.90	▼49.2	▲50.80	
2025	▲50.90	▲50.90	▼49.30	▲50.90	▲51.40	▲50.30	▲50.10	▲51.20	▲52.20	▲50.80	▲51.30	▲50.10	
2026	▲51.90	▼49.30	▲51.30	▲51.40	▲51.20	▼49.90	▲50.70	▼46.00	▼47.90				

Annual Cement Production
Year	Production (MT)
2020	▲2,127,832
2021	▲2,732,013
2022	▼2,369,193
2023	▲2,740,288
2024	▲3,265,299
2025	▲3,800,000

Fertiliser Exports
Year	Export Value (US$)
2020	▲19,059,000
2021	▲20,301,000
2022	▲30,035,000
2023	▲73,518,000
2024	▲121,151,000

=== Education ===
As of 2022, Zambia runs a free education policy at public early childhood and secondary schools.

- Education in Zambia
- List of schools in Zambia
- List of universities in Zambia

=== Finance and Banking Services ===
- Central Bank: Bank of Zambia (BOZ)
- List of banks in Zambia

Monetary Policy (Tightening: Red. Easing: Green)
Date	Policy Rate	Monetary Policy Committee Statement
5 November 2015	▲15.50%	Policy Rate adjusted upward by 300 basis points to 15.50%
19 February 2016	15.50%	Policy Rate maintained at 15.50%
20 May 2016	15.50%	Policy Rate maintained at 15.50%
19 August 2016	15.50%	Policy Rate maintained at 15.50%
16 November 2016	15.50%	Policy Rate maintained at 15.50%
22 February 2017	▼14.00%	Policy Rate Reduced by 150 basis points 14.00%, the Overnight Lending Facility (PLF) Rate reduced to 600 basis points above the Policy Rate, and the Statutory Reserve Ratio reduced by 250 basis points to 15.50%
17 May 2017	▼12.50%	Policy Rate Reduced by 150 basis points 12.50%
10 August 2017	▼11.00%	Policy Rate lowered to 11.00% and Statutory Reserve Ratio reduced to 9.50%
22 November 2017	▼10.25%	Policy Rate lowered to 10.25% and Statutory Reserve Ratio reduced to 8.00%
16 February 2018	▼9.75%	Policy Rate cut by 50 Basis Points to 9.75%
16 May 2018	9.75%	Policy Rate maintained at 9.75%
22 August 2018	9.75%	Policy Rate maintained at 9.75%
21 November 2018	9.75%	Policy Rate maintained at 9.75%
20 February 2019	9.75%	Policy Rate maintained at 9.75%
22 May 2019	▲10.25%	Policy Rate adjusted upwards by 50 basis points to 10.25%
21 August 2019	10.25%	Policy Rate maintained at 10.25%
20 November 2019	▲11.50%	Policy Rate adjusted upward by 125 basis points to 11.50%
19 February 2020	11.50%	Policy Rate maintained at 11.25%
20 May 2020	▼9.25%	Policy Rate cut by 225 Basis Points to 9.25%
19 August 2020	▼8.00%	Policy Rate cut by a further 125 Basis Points to 8.00%
18 November 2020	8.00%	Policy Rate held at 8.0%
17 February 2021	▲8.50%	Policy Rate adjusted upwards by 50 basis points to 8.50%
19 May 2021	8.50%	Policy Rate held at 8.50%
1 September 2021	8.50%	Policy Rate held at 8.50%
24 November 2021	▲9.00%	Policy Rate adjusted upwards by 50 basis points to 9.00%
17 February 2022	9.00%	Policy Rate maintained at 9.00%
18 May 2022	9.00%	Policy Rate maintained at 9.00%
17 August 2022	9.00%	Policy Rate maintained at 9.00%
23 November 2022	9.00%	Policy Rate maintained at 9.00%
15 February 2023	▲9.25%	Policy Rate adjusted upwards by 25 basis points to 9.25% On 2 February the Statutory Reserve Ratiowas increased to 11.50% from 9.00%
17 May 2023	▲9.50%	Policy Rate adjusted upwards by 25 basis points to 9.50%
23 August 2023	▲10.00%	Policy Rate adjusted upwards by 50 basis points to 10.00%
22 November 2023	▲11.00%	On 6 November the Statutory Reserve Ratio was increased by 300 basis points to 14.50% Policy Rate adjusted upwards by 100 basis points to 11.00% On 27 November the Statutory Reserve Ratio was increased by 250 basis points to 17.00%
14 February 2024	▲12.50%	On 2 February the Statutory Reserve Ratio was increased by 900 basis points to 26.00% Policy Rate raised by 150 basis points.
15 May 2024	▲13.50%	Policy Rate raised by 100 basis points.
14 August 2024	13.50%	Policy Rate maintained at 13.50%
13 November 2024	▲14.00%	Policy Rate adjusted upwards by 50 basis points to 14.00%
12 February 2025	▲14.50%	Policy Rate raised by 50 basis points.
23 May 2025	14.50%	Policy Rate held at 14.50%

BOZ purchases gold locally from Kansanshi Copper Mine and the Zambia Gold Company for its reserves.

Year	Cummulative Gold Reserves US$	Source	Notes	Cumulative refined gold reserves (kg)
2021	43,000,000			
2022	83,000,000		target for 2022 is US$100 million in Gold	1,438 kilograms
2024	190,000,000 (≈ ZMW 3.7 bn)			Approx. 2,469.17 kg
2025	233,500,000 (≈ ZMW 6.3 bn)			Approx. 2,163.26 kg

Commercial Banks’ Average Lending Rates
Year	2016	2017	2018	2019	2020	2021	2022
Rate	29.20%	▼24.90%	▼23.60%	▲25.63%	▲26.57%	▼25.90%	▼25.22%
Source							

=== Health ===
In May 2025, the Zambian government signed a Joint Venture (JV) agreement with one of India's largest pharmaceutical companies, Akums Drugs and Pharmaceuticals Limited, to establish a manufacturing plant for the local production of approximately 150 essential medicines.

=== Media ===
- Mass media in Zambia

== Infrastructure ==
There are many forms of transport in Zambia. Zambia is highly dependent on road transport.

- Transport in Zambia
- Roads in Zambia
- List of airports in Zambia.
- Rail transport in Zambia
- Water transport in Zambia

== Growth ==
There are, however, positive macroeconomic signs, rooted in reforms implemented in the early and mid-1990s. Zambia's floating exchange rate and open capital markets have provided useful discipline on the government, while at the same time allowing continued diversification of Zambia's export sector, growth in the tourist industry, and procurement of inputs for growing businesses. Some parts of the Copper Belt have experienced a significant revival as spin-off effects from the massive capital reinvestment are experienced.

=== Export Diversification ===
As Zambia continued on its path to diversifying from dependence on Copper with an emphasis on growth in agriculture, in April 2022, the country's Ministry of Agriculture through the Plant Quarantine and Phytosanitary Service (PQPS) approved the first consignment of over 37 metric tons of Zambian grown avocados for export to countries in the European Union.

=== The Multi-Facility Economic Zones (MFEZ) ===
In 2005, the Japanese Government through Japan International Corporation Agency (JICA) aided the Zambia government to introduce the Multi- Facility Economic Zone (MFEZ) programme. The aim is to create a platform for Zambia to achieve economic development by attracting significant domestic and foreign direct investment (FDI) through a strengthened policy and legislative environment. The MFEZs are, special industrial zones for both export-oriented and domestic-oriented industries. The zones are expected to have well appointed infrastructure in place in order to attract and facilitate establishment of world-class enterprises in the zone (s).

Among the MFEZ investment incentives offered for companies operating under the MFEZ/Priority Sector include:

MFEZ Incentives
Category	Tax Rate	Duration	Conditions
Corporate Tax	0%	5 years	from the year of first declaration of dividends
Tax on Profits	30%	5 years	from 6 to 8 years only 50% of the profits to be taxed for years 9 and 10, 75% of profits to be taxed
Import Duty	0%	5 years	on raw materials, capital goods, machinery including trucks and specialised motor vehicles
Value Added Tax	Deferred	-	on machinery and equipment including trucks and specialised motor vehicles imported

Currently there are numerous MFEZs in Zambia:

==== The Lusaka South Multi-Facility Economic Zone (LS-MFEZ) ====
Established in June 2012, the zone prioritizes agribusiness, packaging and printing, palm oil processing, pulp and packaging boards, pharmaceuticals, electrical and electronic appliances, ICTs, education and skills training, R&D, professional, medical, scientific and measuring services.

In 2020, the LS-MFEZ realised US$100.6 million worth of investments bringing the accumulated investments to about US$567.6 million and generating about 7,100 jobs since commencing operations in 2012.

In 2021, the LS-MFEZ realised a record US$309.4 million worth of investments bringing the accumulated investments to about US$877.4 million with permanent jobs at about 9,360 and total jobs including construction workers at 11,560.

==== The Lusaka East Multi-Facility Economic Zone ====
This zone is also known as the Zambia-China Economic & Trade Cooperation Zone (ZCCZ).

The zone prioritizes agriculture (circular and tourism agricultures), agro-processing, brewery, pharmaceuticals, building materials, logistics (storage) and international commerce.

==== Roma Industrial and Commercial Park ====
Launched in 2011, is expected to generate more than 4,000 permanent jobs once fully developed and is focused on real estate and residential developments.

==== Chambishi Multi-Facility Economic Zone (CMFEZ) ====
Opened in 2007, prioritizes mining, engineering equipment assembly, construction materials, fertilizers, agriculture, and service sectors such as banking and hospitals.

By 2016, the CMFEZ had already received investment of about US$800 million from 14 enterprises.

==== Chembe Multi-Facility Economic Zone ====
In 2016, the government launched the development of the Chembe Multi-Facility Economic Zone in Chembe, Luapula Province.

==== Chibombo Multi-Facility Economic Zone ====
Located in Chibombo District, Central Province, Zambia, the ground breaking for this zone was held in November 2018 and is also known as the Jiangxi Multi-Facility Economic Zone.

In October 2021, the Chibombo MFEZ signed six project agreements worth US$160 million projected to create over 1,000 jobs.

==== Lumwana Multi-Facility Economic Zone ====
In November 2009, the government of Zambia announced a plan for a US$1.2 billion investment into the declared Lumwana Multi-Facility Economic Zone.

==== Sub-Saharan Gemstones Exchange Industrial Park ====
This Multi-Facility Economic Zone (MFEZ) is located in Ndola, Copperbelt Province.

By October 2011, over US$10 million had been invested in the infrastructure in the MFEZ.

==== Kalumbila Multi-Facility Economic Zone (MFEZ) ====
Located in North-Western Province, this MFEZ received approval by the Ministry of Commerce, Trade and Industry in September 2022.

The expected initial investment was approximately US$100 million.

The facility was intended to offer local vendors an industrial base to set up a local supply chain for the growing Kalumbila copper mine, upcoming Enterprise nickel mine, and other businesses around the First Quantum Minerals (FQM) sites.

==== Golden Boaobab Multi-Facility Economic Zone ====
In July 2024, the Government of Zambia approved the creation of the an MFEZ in Kafue District in Lusaka Province. The facility is expected to receive an initial investment of up to 6.7 billion kwacha (US$300 million) and create 2,000 jobs over a 5 year period. Planned developments include assembly of 40-tonne tipper trucks for mining, earth-moving machinery and commercial vehicles, steel processing, food processing facilities, two- and three-wheeler motorcycle assembly, a solar energy plant and electric vehicle assembly.

==== Actualized Investments ====
Multi-Facility Economic Zones (MFEZ) and Industrial Parks (IPs) Actualized Investments
Year	Actualized Value (USD)	Actualized Value (ZMW)	Number of Jobs created	Source
2019	US$1.90 billion	ZMW 24.53 billion	14,775	
2020	▲US$2.18 billion	▲ZMW 39.92 billion	▲25,795	
2021	▲US$2.74 billion	▲ZMW 53.95 billion	▲35,794	
2022	▲US$4.40 billion	▲ZMW 74.36 billion	▲19,528	

=== MSME Financing ===
In July 2025, Growth Investment Partners (GIP) Zambia, a partnership between British International Investment (BII), Swedfund and Zambia's National Pension Scheme Authority (Napsa) was launched. The partnership was meant to provide 1.6 billion kwacha (US$70 million) in funding for small and medium-sized businesses in local currency. The commitments were 859 billion kwacha (US$37,5 million) from BII, 401 million kwacha (US$17.5 million) from Napsa and 344 million kwacha (US$15 million) from Swedfund. Over the next 15 years, GIP Zambia is expected to deploy more than 6.9 billion kwacha ($300 million) to 150 SMEs.

=== Fintech ===
Zambia has a relatively quiet startup and venture capital space; however, the trend seems to be shifting as in August 2021 fintech company Union54 led the way by being the first Zambian startup accepted into Y Combinator's summer batch of YC 2021. In October 2021, American investment firm Tiger Global led a U$3 million seed round in Union54. And in April 2022, the Zambian company raised an additional U$12 million in a seed extension round also led by Tiger Global.

=== Salaula ===
Standard economic theory and empirical data indicates that second-hand clothing import can have positive effects in a country like Zambia (one of the least developed countries in the world). The salaula market reduces the proportion of income that a family has to spend on clothing. It also helps to keep employments like repairs and alterations in business and forces tailors to proceed into more specialize production of styled garments.

There is a downside to such imports, however; the massive importation of used clothing from the developed world has resulted in a near-total collapse of the Zambian indigenous textile industry. In the face of cheap used clothing, tailors' specialized production may be irrelevant - customers will buy the least expensive clothing available, irrespective of style. Those who might otherwise work at textile mills or clothing factories are left jobless, or else make significantly less money in the salaula resale business.

=== Electric Battery Value Chain ===
Zambia and Democratic Republic of the Congo (DRC), two countries, that have more than 70% of the world's Cobalt reserves and an abundance of Copper, Nickel and Manganese have resolved to set up a Zambia-DRC-Executive Battery Council to oversee the implementation of the cooperating agreement for the electric vehicle battery value chain. The Executive Council's executive committee will be composed of President Hakainde Hichilema, his DRC counterpart Felix Tshisekedi, the Deputy Secretary General of the African Economic Community for the United Nations, as well as the President of AFREXIM Bank, as a financial partner. Also issued was a communiqué by the two heads of state that indicated that the two countries will also harmonize policies for the initiative. Zambia and the DRC signed the MOU in Lusaka Zambia on 29 April 2022.

In July 2022, the African Export-Import Bank President Benedict Oramah, whilst in Lusaka Zambia, announced that a pool of investors had earmarked more than US$500.0 million to set up an industrial park for the purposes of adding value to the copper, cobalt, and manganese mined in Zambia. The investors will set up plants to process cobalt, copper, and lithium that are in Zambia and neighboring countries and establish a US$250 million Battery Electric Vehicle (BEV) manufacturing plant.

In July 2022, at the 94th Agricultural and Commercial Show in Lusaka, the managing director of the National Utility ZESCO, Victor Mapani announced that the company plans to deploy Electric Vehicle EV charging stations across the country in an effort to accelerate and promote the transition to EVs and enhance carbon emission reduction.

In December 2022, on the sidelines of the ongoing US-Africa summit in Washington DC, Zambia, the Democratic Republic of the Congo (DRC) and the United States of America signed an MOU toward the actualization of the electric vehicle battery value chain. Different US institutions and agencies such as USAID, the US Department of Commerce, the Trade and Development Agency, are exploring technical assistance for the Zambia-DRC EV supply chain. Additionally, the Export-Import Bank of the United States, the Development Finance Corporation, will be exploring financing and support mechanisms for investment in African electric vehicle value chains.

In April 2023, The African Export-Import Bank (Afreximbank) and the United Nations Economic Commission for Africa (ECA) signed a framework agreement with Zambia and the Democratic Republic of Congo for the establishment of special economic zones for the production of electric vehicles and batteries. Afreximbank and ECA will lead the establishment of an operating company in consortium with public and private investors and Afreximbank's impact fund subsidiary, the Fund for Export Development in Africa. The new company will develop special economic zones (SEZs) dedicated to the production of battery precursors, batteries, and electric vehicles, in both nations.

In October 2023, the Chinese company Better Technology Group announced that procurement of electric vehicle battery, energy storage battery and Uninterruptiple Supply battery manufacturing equipment was under underway and will be delivered in Zambia by December 2023. This equipment will be part of the EV battery manufacturing facility to be set up in Zambia's Chibomba- Jiangxi Multi Facility Economic Zone in Central Province with construction set to be completed by March 2024. The Group President also announced that the company has budgeted to invest ZMW 2.18 billion kwacha (US$100 million) in the Venture through 2026.

=== Telecommunications ===
In June 2023, an internet services license was granted to Starlink by the Zambian Government through the Electronic Government Division – SMART Zambia, following the completion of trial projects throughout the nation.

== Inflation ==
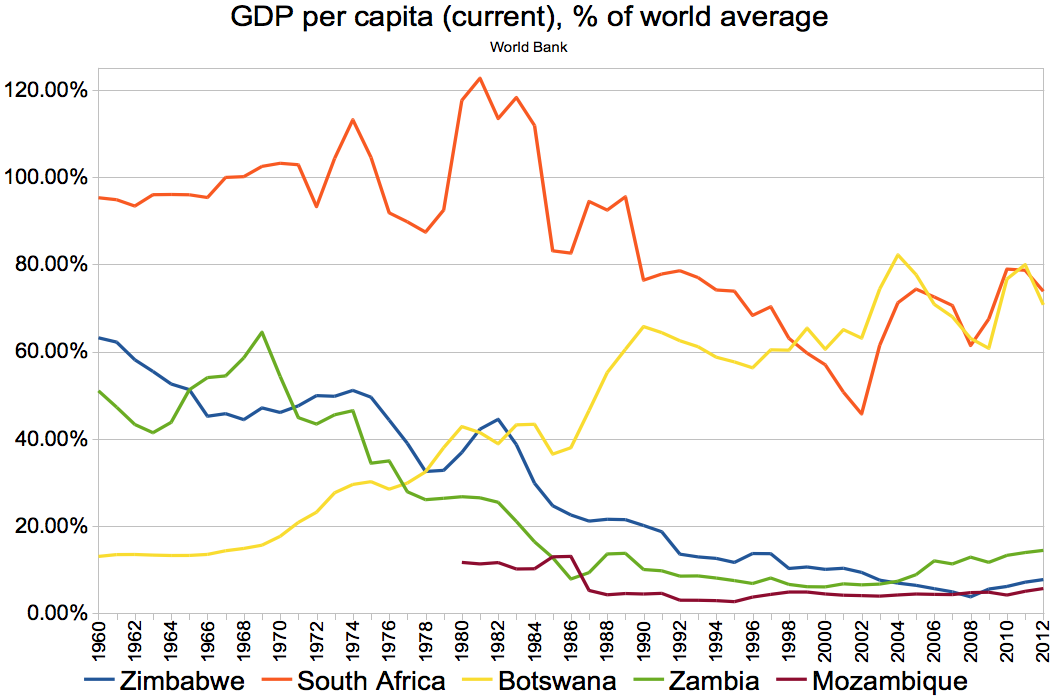
GDP per capita (current), compared to neighbouring countries (world average = 100)

Lack of balance-of-payment support meant the Zambian government did not have resources for [capital investment and periodically had to issue bonds or otherwise expand the money supply to try to meet its spending and debt obligations. The government continued these activities even after balance-of-payment support resumed. This has kept interest rates at levels that are too high for local business, fuelled inflation, burdened the budget with domestic debt payments, while still falling short of meeting the public payroll and other needs, such as infrastructure rehabilitation. The government was forced to draw down foreign exchange reserves sharply in 1998 to meet foreign debt obligations, putting further pressure on the kwacha and inflation. Inflation held at 32% in 2000; consequently, the kwacha lost the same value against the dollar over the same period. In mid- to late 2001, Zambia's fiscal management became more conservative. As a result, 2001 year-end inflation was below 20%, its best result in decades. In 2002 inflation rose to 26.7%. However, in 2007 inflation hit 8%, the first time in 30 years that Zambia had seen single digit inflation.

On January 27, 2011, it was reported by the Central Statistical Office that inflation rose to 9%. in 2012

Between April 2019 and April 2020 Zambia' s Annual inflation rate rose to 15.7% from 14% in March 2020. The rise of prices in food and other non- food items led to the increase in the Annual inflation rate.

However, it is significant that inflation often peaks in election years, hitting a recent high of 17.9% in 2016. This suggests that a further peak is likely approaching during the 2021 general elections. The value of the kwacha against the dollar has been relatively consistent for the past two years and has yet to return to the recent high of almost 0.2 kwacha to the dollar in 2013. Nonetheless, the real effective exchange rate of the kwacha against a weighted average of foreign currencies improved from 88.5 in 2016 to 96.4 in 2017. The kwacha lost value against the dollar in September 2018 but has remained fairly consistent at 0.08 to the dollar in November to December, though further instability remains likely due to both political and economic uncertainty.

== Economic Statistics ==
Main Economic Indicators 1980–2020 (with IMF staff estimates in 2021–2022) Inflation below 10% is in green.
Year	GDP (in Bil. US$PPP)	GDP per capita (in US$ PPP)	GDP (in Bil. US$nominal)	GDP per capita (in US$ nominal)	GDP growth % (real)	Inflation rate (in Percent)	Unemployment (in percent)	Government debt (in % of GDP)
1980	▲7.806	▲1,321.44	▲4.246	▲718.80	▲3.85%	▲11.73%	N/A	N/A
1981	▲9.111	▲1,493.25	▲4.385	▼718.74	▲6.63%	▲14.00%	N/A	N/A
1982	▲9.392	▼1,491.45	▼4.232	▼672.01	▼-2.91%	▲12.50%	N/A	N/A
1983	▲9.648	▼1,485.51	▼3.653	▼562.44	▼-1.15%	▲19.69%	N/A	N/A
1984	▲9.825	▼1,467.55	▼3.003	▼448.53	▼-1.72%	▲20.02%	N/A	N/A
1985	▲10.261	▲1,487.63	▼2.848	▼448.53	▲1.24%	▲37.43%	N/A	N/A
1986	▲10.645	▲1,498.40	▼1.962	▼276.15	▲1.70%	▲47.99%	N/A	N/A
1987	▲11.071	▲1,513.02	▲2.431	▲332.27	▲1.49%	▲43.04%	N/A	N/A
1988	▲12.524	▲1,661.46	▲4.095	▲543.32	▲9.27%	▲45.82%	N/A	N/A
1989	▲12.539	▼1,613.97	▲4.365	▲561.83	▲-3.66%	▲113.16%	N/A	N/A
1990	▲12.933	▼1,613.94	▼4.085	▼509.75	▲-0.58%	▲93.87%	N/A	N/A
1991	▲13.281	▼1,608.16	▼3.690	▼446.78	▼-0.67%	▲85.28%	N/A	N/A
1992	▲13.863	▲1,629.97	▼3.614	▼424.95	▼2.05%	▲146.71%	N/A	N/A
1993	▲14.180	▼1,620.32	▼3.549	▼405.59	▼-0.08%	▲158.40%	N/A	N/A
1994	▼12.556	▼1,392.28	▲3.657	▼405.54	▼-13.31%	▲46.07%	N/A	N/A
1995	▲13.190	▲1,425.36	▲3.799	▲410.54	▲2.90%	▲31.46%	N/A	N/A
1996	▲14.267	▲1,501.48	▼3.599	▼378.71	▲6.22%	▲38.38%	N/A	N/A
1997	▲15.067	▲1,543.08	▲4.303	▲440.70	▲3.81%	▲21.42%	N/A	N/A
1998	▲15.177	▼1,512.60	▼3.538	▼352.63	▼-0.39%	▲22.66%	N/A	N/A
1999	▲16.107	▲1,562.42	▼3.405	▼330.28	▲4.65%	▲23.86%	N/A	N/A
2000	▲17.114	▲1,616.81	▲3.601	▲340.16	▲3.90%	▲24.09%	12.93%	▼28.89%
2001	▲18.430	▲1,696.89	▲3.870	▲356.32	▲5.32%	▲21.36%	▲13.51%	▼21.89%
2002	▲19.561	▲1,755.88	▲4.194	▲376.47	▲4.51%	▲22.24%	▲14.12%	▼21.74%
2003	▲21.332	▲1,866.96	▲4.902	▲429.01	▲6.95%	▲21.40%	▲14.70%	▲23.92%
2004	▲23.445	▲1,999.40	▲6.221	▲530.54	▲7.03%	▲17.97%	▲15.30%	▼19.26%
2005	▲25.930	▲2,152.92	▲8.329	▲691.55	▲7.24%	▲18.33%	▲15.90%	▼13.09%
2006	▲28.842	▲2,329.39	▲12.762	▲1,030.69	▲7.90%	▼9.02%	▼13.25%	▲21.61%
2007	▲32.096	▲2,519.51	▲14.060	▲1,103.69	▲8.35%	▲10.66%	▼10.59%	▼17.59%
2008	▲35.255	▲2,688.11	▲17.914	▲1,365.93	▲7.77%	▲12.45%	▼7.93%	▼16.28%
2009	▲38.752	▲2,868.81	▼15.332	▼1,135.01	▲9.22%	▲13.39%	▲10.56%	▲16.47%
2010	▲43.256	▲3,108.17	▲20.264	▲1,456.05	▲10.30%	▼8.50%	▲13.19%	▼15.95%
2011	▲46.612	▲3,249.60	▲23.455	▲1,635.17	▲5.57%	▼8.66%	▼10.55%	▲16.42%
2012	▲49.509	▲3,348.12	▲25.502	▲1,724.63	▲7.60%	▼6.58%	▼7.85%	▲20.07%
2013	▲53.420	▲3,503.86	▲28.042	▲1,839.33	▲5.06%	▼6.98%	▲8.61%	▲22.43%
2014	▲54.506	▼3,467.10	▼27.145	▼1,726.65	▲4.70%	▼7.81%	▲9.36%	▲31.91%
2015	▼54.473	▼3,360.02	▼21.245	▼1,310.46	▲2.92%	▲10.12%	▲10.13%	▲61.94%
2016	▲55.712	▼3,332.67	▼20.965	▼1,254.12	▲3.78%	▲17.87%	▲10.87%	▼58.32%
2017	▲58.735	▲3,407.31	▲25.874	▲1,500.96	▲3.50%	▼6.58%	▲11.63%	▲63.46%
2018	▲62.565	▲3,520.21	▲26.312	▼1,480.42	▲4.04%	▼6.99%	▲12.01%	▲77.96%
2019	▲64.602	▲3,526.11	▼23.309	▼1,272.24	▲1.44%	▼9.15%	▲12.52%	▲97.39%
2020	▼63.559	▼3,366.14	▼18.111	▼959.15	▼-2.79%	▲15.73%	▲12.85%	▲140.21%
2021	▲69.245	▲3,559.05	▲21.313	▼1,095.47	▲4.60%	▲22.02%	▼12.50%	▼119.41%
2022	▲76.325	▲3,808.05	▲27.025	▲1,348.36	▲2.91%	▲12.53%	N/A	▼71.10%
2023	▲85.951	▲4,178.52	▲28.406	▲1,380.97	▲5.80%	▼10.95%	N/A	▲115.23%

== Trade ==
Exports of Zambia by product category (2019) Chemical products Transportation Machines Mineral products Plastics and rubbers Metals Foodstuffs Precious metals Textiles Instruments Animal products Vegetable products Paper goods Footwear and headwear Miscellaneous Stone and glass Wood products Animal and vegetable bi-products Animal hides Arts and antiques Weapons

Table Below shows Imports and Exports of Goods, Services and Primary Income (BoP)
Year	Imports (current millions US$)	Exports (current millions US$)	Trade Balance (current millions US$)	Total Trade(current millions US$)	% Growth in Trade
1997	▲1,633	▲1,269	▼-364	2,902	
1998	▼1,507	▼961	▼-546	2,468	▼ -14.96%
1999	▲1,353	▼923	▼-430	2,276	▼ -7.78%
2000	▲1,567	▼891	▼-676	2,458	▲8.00%
2001	▲1,824	▲1,076	▼-748	2,900	▲17.98%
2002	▲1,885	▲1,146	▼-739	2,961	▲2.10%
2003	▲1,994	▲1,283	▼-711	3,277	▲10.67%
2004	▲2,582	▲2,108	▼-474	4,690	▲30.13%
2005	▲3,181	▲2,842	▼-339	6,023	▲28.42%
2006	▲4,337	▲4,567	▲230	8,904	▲47.83%
2007	▲5,967	▲5,262	▼-705	11,229	▲26.11%
2008	▲6,818	▲5,661	▼-1,157	12,479	▲10.02%
2009	▼4,509	▼4,906	▲397	9,415	▼ -24.55%
2010	▲6,969	▲8,063	▲1,094	15,032	▲59.66%
2011	▲8,715	▲9,430	▲715	18,145	▲20.71%
2012	▲9,603	▲10,521	▲918	20,124	▲9.83%
2013	▲12,170	▲11,607	▼-563	23,777	▲20.71%
2014	▼11,762	▼11,077	▼-685	22,839	▼ -3.94%
2015	▼9,226	▼8,232	▼-994	17,458	▼ -23.56%
2016	▼8,656	▼7,490	▼-1,166	16,146	▼ -7.52%
2017	▲9,947	▲9,154	▼-793	19,101	▲18.30%
2018	▲10,628	▲10,010	▼-618	20,638	▲8.05%
2019	▼8,485	▼8,303	▼-182	16,788	▼ -18.65%
2020	▼6,382	▲8,594	▲2,212	14,976	▼ -10.79%
2021	▲6,899	▲11,111	▲4,212	18,010	▲20.26%
2022	▲9,047	▲11,651	▲2,604	20,698	▲14.93%
2023	▲9,324	▼9,652	▲328	18,976	▼ -8.32%
2024	▲11,194	▲11,198	▲4	22,393	▲18.00%
2025	▲13,171	▲13,314	▲143	26,485	▲18.27%

Export Earnings from Minerals
Year	Copper (millions US$)	NTEs (millions US$)	Cobalt (millions US$)	Gold (millions US$)	Nickel (millions ZMW | US$)	Zinc (millions ZMW | US$)
2014	▲7,619	▲2,272	▲123.9	▲152.2		
2015	▼5,234	▼1,849	▼70.7	▲152.8		
2016	▼4,399	▼1,749	▲112.9	▲191.2		
2017	▲6,039	▲1,780	▲138.4	▼154.1		
2018	▲6,658	▲2,036	▼116.7	▼148.2		
2019	▼4,995	▼1,919	▼42.7	▲196.4		
2020	▲5,867	▼1,869	▼10.6	▲220.5		
2021	▲8,345	▲2,508	▼5.0	▼209.2	▲1,642.4 (US$83.6)	▲53.0 (US$ 2.7)
2022	▼8,136	▲3,179	▼0.0	▼187.3	▲1,951.0 (US$119.2)	▲75.3 (US$ 4.6)
2023	▼6,613	▲3,766	0.0	▼127.5	▲2,679.1 (US$134.0)	▲1,475.5 (US$ 73.8)
2024	▲7,360		▲37.3	▲223.4	▲8,428.1 (US$323.7)	▲3,030.7 (US$116.4)
2025					▼6.673.9 (US$268.7)	▲7,738.2 (US$316.2)

Major trade enhancing infrastructure projects carried out in Zambia's history:

- TAZARA Railway commissioned in 1975 for a cost of US $406 million (the equivalent of US $3.37 billion in 2022 USD rate).
- Kazungula Bridge, commissioned in May 2021 for a cost of US$259.3 million.
- Levy Mwanawasa (Chembe) Bridge, commissioned in October 2008 for a cost of US$1.5 million.
- Chinsali-Nakonde road is being constructed using grant funds from the African Development Bank. The 210 km stretch is valued at 6.3 billion kwacha (US$255.76 million). The road which is being constructed in two lots by China State Engineering Corporation and China Railway 7 group is expected to be completed in December 2026.

== Major exhibitions ==
- Zambia International Trade Fair held annually in Ndola at the beginning of July.
- Agriculture and Commercial Show held annually in Lusaka at the beginning of August.
- Central Province Agriculture Show, held in Mkushi.

== Notable Companies ==
- List of companies of Zambia
- Lusaka Stock Exchange LuSE

== Public Private Partnerships (PPP) ==
In December 2021, Zambia's UPND Government set up the Public-Private Partnership (PPP) Council of Ministers composed of the Minister of Finance and National Planning (Dr. Situmbeko Musokotwane) as the Chairperson and the Ministers of Infrastructure (Charles Milupi), Commerce, Trade, and Industry (Chipoka Mulenga), Transport and Logistics (Frank Tayali), and Technology and Science (Felix Mutati). The focus of the council is to have public-private partnerships become the primary avenue for infrastructure development as opposed to the solely government funded path.

Major Public Private Partnership (PPP) Projects
Project	Length	Tender Bidding Process	Expected Impact	JV Partners	Project Construction Start	Project Completion	Source
Lusaka-Ndola Dual Carriageway	327 km	Closed	Key connection of the Trans-African Highway network in particular the Trans-African Highway 4 (TAH 4) and the Trans-African Highway 9 (TAH 9) $650 million concession agreement. 25-yr deal with 3-yrs construction and 22-yrs operate toll gates and maintain road. Deal includes 45 km of the Luanshya-Fisenge-Masangano Road	Macro-Ocean Investment Consortium Government of Zambia	Q3 2023 (August)	Expected Q4 2026	
Mufulira-Mokambo road	15 km	Closed	Improved Trade with the Democratic Republic of the Congo PPP was signed in November 2024 $56.7 million concession agreement 22-yr deal with 2-yrs construction and 20-yrs operate toll gate and maintain road. Deal includes construction of border post facilities at Mokambo.	Jasworld Ports Limited Government of Zambia	Expected Q1 2025	Expected 2027	
Ndola-Sakania-Mufulira road	61 km	Closed	Improved Trade with the Democratic Republic of the Congo Improved Trade for Local Markets ZMW 1.64 billion kwacha (US$76.1 million) concession agreement to develop the 61 kilometers of the Mufulira-Sakania-Ndola road The concession is contracted to run for a period of 22 years, inclusive of the three years for construction	Jaswin Ports Limited Government of Zambia	2024	Expected 2026	
Chingola - Kasumbalesa road	35 km	Closed	Improved Trade with the Democratic Republic of the Congo Improved Trade for Local Markets Improved Trade for the SADC Region Expected cost ZMW 558 million kwacha (U$31 million)	Turbo Ka-Chin Investment Consortia Government of Zambia	Q2 2022 (May)	December 2023	
Katete-Chanida road	55 km	Closed	Improved Trade with Mozambique PPP signing was in October 2023 The 25 year Concession agreement worth ZMW 1.7 billion kwacha (US$79.8 million) was signed in October 2023. The concession duration included 2 years for construction and 23 years for operation and maintenance. It includes improving border infrastructure at Chanida.	Lutembwe Consulting Company Government of Zambia	Q1 2024	Expected Q4 2025	
Lumwana-Kambimba Border Post	45 km	Closed	The road will connect Lumwana with Kolwezi in Democratic Republic of the Congo Improved Trade for the SADC Region Concession agreement signed Q3 2023 (September)	Sandstone Consortium Government of Zambia	Q4 2024	TBA	
Kasomeno-Kasenga-Chalwe-Kabila-Mwenda Road and Luapula River Bridge	182 km	Closed	Also known as the Kasomeno-Mwendo Toll Road (KMTR) Project, it is a critical trade link between Luapula Province in Zambia and Lubumbashi in the DRC Will be a key connection into the Trans-African Highway network in particular the Trans-African Highway 4 (TAH 4) to Dar es Salaam, Tanzania	GED Africa Agence Congolaise des Grands Travaux (ACGT) Zambia Road Development Agency (RDA)	Q3 2023 (October)	Expected Q4 2026 (December)	
Chingola-Solwezi-Mutanda Dual Carriageway	205 km	Closed	The 30 year Concession agreement worth US$250 million was signed in 2021. It primarily involves converting the entire stretch into a dual carriageway.	Bert Pave and Maintenance Limited Government of Zambia	Q1 2022	TBA	
Mutanda-Kasempa-Kaoma road	371 km	Closed	The 25 year Concession agreement worth US$326 million was signed in 2024.	Barotse Highway Limited Government of Zambia	Q1 2025	Expected 2027	
Solwezi-Kipushi road	111 km	Closed	The 25 year Concession agreement worth US$145 million was signed in 2024.	Borderway Capital Investments Government of Zambia	Q1 2025	Expected 2027	

== Constituency Development Funds Performance ==
Decentralized funds directed at enhancing public service delivery and targeted at local communities to spur economic development at ward and constituency level.

Table below tracks the reported absorption of disbursed funds into the local communities Below 50% is red. Above 50% is green
Budget Year	Allocation	Disbursed	Absorption Rate	Absorption Value	Reporting Period	Source
2022	ZMW 4.0 billion (US$228.4 million)	ZMW 4.0 billion (US$228.4 million)	55.0%	ZMW 2.2 billion	1 January 2022 - 31 December 2022	
2023	ZMW 4.4 billion (US$278.7 million)	ZMW 2.7 billion	60.0%	ZMW 1.3 billion	1 January 2023 - 31 December 2023	
2024	ZMW 4.8 billion (US$228.1 million)	N/A	N/A	N/A	N/A	
2025	ZMW 5.6 billion (US$212.1 million)	N/A	N/A	ZMW 3.0 billion	1 January 2025 - 30 September 2025	
2026	ZMW 6.2 billion (US$261.1 million)	N/A	N/A	N/A	N/A	

== Private Wealth ==
In 2021, the total estimated value of private wealth in Zambia was US$14 billion (ZMW 238 billion)

== See also ==
- Bank of Zambia
- Child labor in Zambia
- Economy of Africa
- FORGE Program
- List of companies of Zambia
- United Nations Economic Commission for Africa
- Category:Companies of Zambia
- Bibliography of the history of Zambia
