= Investrust Bank =

Coordinates: 15°25′23″S 28°16′46″E

- Company type: Formerly a Public: LUSE: INVT (delisted July 2025)
- Industry: Financial services
- Founded: January 1, 1996; 30 years ago location = Lusaka, Zambia
- Key people: Dr Jacob Mwanza; Chairman; Simangolwa Shakalima; Managing Director
- Products: Loans, Checking, Savings, Investments, Debit Cards
- Revenue: ▼Aftertax: ZMK:47.395 million (US$4.8 million (2016)
- Total assets: ZMW:1.284 billion (US$129.7 million) (2016)
- Number of employees: 456 (2016)
- Website: Homepage

Investrust Bank Plc., commonly known as Investrust Bank, was a commercial bank in Zambia, licensed by the Bank of Zambia, the central bank and national banking regulator. In 2024, the bank became insolvent and was possessed by the Bank of Zambia.

== Location ==
The head office of the bank was in Ody's Building, along Great East Road, in Lusaka. The main branch of Investrust Bank Zambia Limited was located in Investrust House, at 4527 and 4527 Freedom Way, in the city of Lusaka, Zambia.

== Overview ==
As of December 2016, Investrust Bank was a medium-sized financial services provider in Zambia. It had under its control, assets totaling ZMW:1.284 billion (US$129.7 million), with shareholders' equity valued at ZMW:115.32 million (US$11.64 million).

== History ==
The bank was founded in 1996, registering as a corporate entity, receiving a banking license and commencing banking operations during that year. In the beginning, the institution was privately held and was known as Investrust Merchant Bank Zambia Limited. In 2002, the bank's name was changed to Investrust Bank Limited. During 2004, the bank's stock was provisionally listed on the Lusaka Stock Exchange (LUSE) for the first time. In 2007 the bank's stock became fully listed on the LUSE. In April 2024 the Bank of Zambia formally took possession of the bank due to insolvency. In July 2025 the bank was formerly delisted.

== Ownership ==
Investrust bank was a public company whose stock was publicly traded on the Lusaka Stock Exchange until July 2025. The detailed shareholding in the bank was as depicted in the table below, as of 31 December 2016.

Investrust Bank Plc Stock Ownership
Rank	Name of Owner	Percentage Ownership			
1	ZCCM Investments Holdings Plc	71.4			
2	Bank of Nevis International Limited	24.08	3	Workers' Compensation Fund Control Board	4.0
4	Stanbic Bank Zambia Pension Scheme	4.0			
5	Justin Bevin Zulu	3.0			
7	Others	7.0			
	Total	100.00			

== Branch Network ==
As of May 2018, the bank previously maintained a network of branches at the following locations:

1. Head Office: Ody's Building, Great East Road, Lusaka
2. Lusaka Main Branch: Investrust House, 4527/8 Freedom Way, Lusaka
3. Savings Centre Branch: Investrust House, 4527/8 Freedom Way, Lusaka
4. Kenneth Kaunda International Airport Agency: Lusaka International Airport, Lusaka
5. Arcades Branch: Shop Number 32, Great East Road, Lusaka
6. Mulungushi Branch: Mulungushi House, Ridgeway, Lusaka
7. Industrial Branch: 13969 Chandwe Musonda Road, Lusaka
8. Soweto Branch: Off of Los Angeles Road, Stand Number 67, New Soweto Market, Lusaka
9. Kafue Road Branch: 14093 Kafue Road, Lusaka
10. Manda Hill Branch: Manda Hill Shopping Centre, Corner of Great East Road & Manchinchi Road, Lusaka
11. Levy Business Park Branch: Shop Number F06 & F08 Levy Business Park, Lusaka
12. Mumbwa Road Branch: 284/132/34 Unit 5, Mumbwa Road, Lusaka
13. Chililabombwe Branch: 72 Independence Avenue, Town Centre, Chililabombwe
14. Chingola Branch: Civic Centre Building, Kabundi Road, Chingola
15. Chipata Branch: 1783 Parenyatwa Road, Chipata
16. Mwami Border Agency: Chipata
17. Chirundu Branch: Units 39/40 & 51/52, Clearing Agents Building, Chirundu OSBP, Chirundu Border Road, Chirundu
18. Choma Branch: 398 Livingstone Road, Choma
19. Copperbelt University Branch: Main Campus, Copperbelt University, Riverside, Kitwe
20. Freedom Avenue Branch: Freedom Avenue, Kitwe
21. Kabwe Branch: 1549 Kabwe Municipal, Revenue Hall, Freedom Way, Kabwe
22. Kitwe Branch: 14 Obote Avenue, Kitwe
23. Livingstone Branch: 103 Mosi-0-Tunya Road, Livingstone
24. Nkumbula International Airport Agency: Harry Mwanga Nkumbula International Airport, Livingstone
25. Luangwa Branch: Luangwa
26. Lumwana Branch: Lumwana
27. President Avenue Branch: 93902 Z–Mart Mall Building, President Avenue, Ndola
28. Buteko Avenue Branch: Stand Number 3371, Ndola
29. Solwezi Branch: 23/24 Independence Avenue, Solwezi
30. Mongu Branch: 1868 Independence Road, Mongu.

== Governance ==
At the time of its insolvency, Mr. Peter Banda served as non-executive Chairman of the Board of Directors and Mr. Simangolwa Shakalima was the Managing Director and Chief Executive Officer.

== See also ==
- Bank of Zambia
- Economy of Zambia
- List of banks in Zambia
