= African Explosives =

Mining services company headquartered in Johannesburg

AEL Mining Services
- Industry: Explosives
- Predecessor: African Explosives
- Founded: 1896
- Headquarters: South Africa
- Products: Explosives
- Parent: AECI
- Website: AEL website

AEL Mining Services is a company based in Johannesburg. The company's principal activity is the manufacture of explosives. It serves the mining and construction industries throughout Africa. Its original name, African Explosives Limited, is abbreviated to AEL.

== History ==
AEL was founded in 1896 at Modderfontein after gold was discovered at Witwatersrand.

It later expanded in the early 2000s.

== Operations ==
AEL Mining Services is linked to the AECI Group, a chemical company of South Africa. The company operates manufacturing facilities in Ghana, Mali, Tanzania, Ethiopia, Zambia, Zimbabwe and Botswana. Its stock is listed on the Lusaka Stock Exchange in Zambia.

== See also ==
- List of companies traded on the JSE
- List of companies of South Africa
- Economy of South Africa
