= Limestone Resources Limited =

Zambian company

- Formerly: Ndola Lime Company Limited
- Type: Private
- Industry: Industrials, Mining
- Founded: 1931
- Headquarters: Masaiti District, Copperbelt
- Key people: Kennedy Mwandama (CEO); Stephen Bwalya (CFO)
- Products: Limestone; Hydrated Lime; Quick Lime; Agric Lime; Flux stone
- Revenue: ▲ZMW 74.3 million (2019)
- Net income: ▼ZMW 234.0 million (2019)
- Total assets: ▲ZMW 117.0 million (2019)
- Owner: ZCCM Investments Holdings|Lusaka Stock Exchange:ZCCM
- Website: https://www.lrl.co.zm/

Limestone Resources Limited (LRL), formerly known as Ndola Lime Company Limited (NLC), is a limestone products producing company in Zambia.

It is located in Masaiti at about 10 km south east of Ndola. It is a wholly owned subsidiary of ZCCM-Investments Holdings.

The company was founded in 1931 and is still operational.

== History ==
In July 2017, a joint venture between Zambia Consolidated Copper Mines Investment Holdings and China's Sinoconst was announced to construct a US$528 million 1.85Mta Cement plant at the Ndola Lime Company in Masaiti, with a target to be operational by the first quarter of 2020.

Ndola Lime Company Limited became insolvent in 2018. Under a restructuring plan, a successor company, Limestone Resources Limited (LRL), was created in 2020.

In August 2020, there were rumours surrounding the sale of a majority stake of the company to Global Human Benefit Zambia Ltd. (GHBZ) when an article appeared on GHBZ's website. ZCCM Investments Holdings dispelled the rumour and the article was subsequently removed from the GHBZ website.

== Operations ==
ZCCM Investments Holdings owns 100% of Limestone Resources Limited. The company produces quicklime, hydrated lime, limestone and agricultural lime and supplies within Zambia, SADC and COMESA regions.

== Finances ==
In 2016, the company reported total revenues for the fiscal year ended 31 March 2016 of ZMW 196.6 million and a loss after tax of ZMW 82 3million.

In 2017, the company reported total revenues for the fiscal year ended 31 March 2017 of ZMW 89.6 million and a loss after tax of ZMW 1,163.0 million.

In 2018, the company reported total revenues for the fiscal year ended 31 March 2018 of ZMW 60.1 million and a loss after tax of ZMW 190 million.

In 2019, the company reported total revenues for the fiscal year ended 31 March 2019 of ZMW 74.3 million and a loss after tax of ZMW 234 million.
