= Lusaka Securities Exchange =

Securities exchange in Lusaka, Zambia

- Type: Stock Exchange
- Location: 2nd Floor Mamco House Plot 316B Independence Ave Lusaka , Zambia,
- Founded: 21 February 1993
- Key people: CEO Nicholas Kabaso
- Currency: Kwacha
- No. of listings: 22 (may 2025)
- Market cap: ZMW 276.7 billion (US$ 9.8 billion) (April 2025)
- Indices: LuSE All Share Index (LASI)
- Website: https://luse.co.zm/

The Lusaka Securities Exchange (abbreviated to LuSE) is the principal stock exchange of Zambia and Zambia's designated agency for issuing International Securities Identification Numbers (ISIN). Founded in 1993, it is located in Lusaka, in 2020 the Exchange incorporated a subsidiary called the Lusaka Clearing and Settlement Agency (LCSA). This was part of the strategy to serve the market in a more efficient and effective manner. The LCSA is an entity that provides depository services that include automated delivery, clearing and settlement services.

The LuSE is a member of the African Stock Exchanges Association, Committee of SADC Stock Exchanges, Association of National Numbering Agencies, Capital Markets Association of Zambia, African Natural Capital Alliance.

As of April 2025, the LuSE had 20 listed companies with a market capitalisation of ZMW 276.7 billion (US$9.8 billion).

== History ==
The Lusaka Securities Exchange (LuSE) was established with preparatory technical assistance from the International Finance Corporation (IFC) and the World Bank in 1993. The Exchange opened on 21 February 1994. In its first two years of operations, the LuSE and Securities and Exchange Commission (SEC) were funded by the UNDP and Government of Zambia as a project for financial and capital market development in Zambia, under the multi-component private sector development program. The formation of LuSE was part of the government's economic reform program aimed at developing the financial and capital market in order to support and enhance private sector initiative. It was also expected to attract foreign portfolio investment through recognition of Zambia and the region as an emerging capital market with potentially high investment returns.

Another important role of LuSE was to facilitate the divestiture of Government ownership in parastatals and realization of the objectives of creating a broad and wide shareholding ownership by the citizenry via a fair and transparent process.

The 1972 Securities Act revised to facilitate the establishment of the Securities Exchange. It was structured around models of a modern Stock Exchange with automated clearing and settlement facilities through a Central Securities Depository (CSD). The Government of the Republic of Zambia (GRZ) provided grant financing to LuSE from 1993 till 2009. Subsequently, GRZ stopped providing support and LuSE became totally dependent on its listed companies to generate operational revenues. The sustainability of LuSE became dependent on increasing the number and size of companies that listed on the Exchange. In 2005, the company introduced its own governance code for listed companies. All Africa later called the code "a landmark achievement in the development of corporate governance in Zambia."

The LuSE, since inception, has expanded beyond being a platform for trading shares and bonds, as demonstrated by some companies from across the spectrum of industry that have used it to raise the public capital for expansion. Among its largest companies in 2024, were Copperbelt Energy Corporation, ZCCM IH, Zambia Sugar, ZANACO, Standard Chartered Bank Zambia, Airtel Zambia, Lafarge and Zambrew, PUMA, Real Estate Investment Zambia (REIZ),.

In January 2022, it was reported that the LuSE topped the list of the Best performing exchanges in Africa with a 93.2 percent gain. In March 2022, the LuSE launched the online GEM Portal, an initiative approved by the Securities and Exchange Commission of Zambia to provide start-ups, small and medium businesses with access to funding to assist the growth of new business ventures and rebuild businesses impacted by the COVID-19 pandemic. In September 2022, the government of Zambia announced a zero withholding tax on interest from investment in green bonds on the local bourse to stimulate green investments. At the end of that month, the Lusaka Securities Exchange All Share Index had strengthened 28 percent YTD in dollar terms of which 17 percent is attributed to third quarter in comparison to the S&P500 which had slid 25 percent amidst a global environment characterized by excessive inflation, soft commodity price dislocations and monetary policy tightening.

== Mission statement and mandate ==
To provide investors, businesses and other issuers with an efficient, reliable, orderly, transparent and cost effective platform for the raising of capital and trading of securities.

The LuSE's core mandate is to provide a fair and efficient platform through transparent and equitable trading of the listed securities. LuSE contributes to wealth development, financial services and a platform for investment for foreign and local investors. It provides a platform where companies can raise long term capital and secondary trading of shares. LuSE also provides facilities for the listing of securities and provides users with an orderly, transparent and regulated platform to trade.

== Market listings ==
As of November 2024 there were 20 Listings on the LuSE And a total of 15 companies were showing on the quoted tier. During the year 2024, two entities delisted from the Exchange namely Taj Pamodzi Hotel and Investrust Bank Zambia Limited.

During 2024 fiscal year the LuSE listed its first Real Estate Investment Trust (REIT) which was listed in USD. As things stand as of November 2024. The LuSE operates a multi-currency listings of both USD and Zambian Kwacha.

The LuSE operates an Alternative Market (Alt-M) meant for high quality and growth MSMEs.

Number	Symbol	Company	Sector	ISIN Code	Notes
1.	AECI	African Explosives Zambia (Formerly AELZ)	Basic Materials	ZM0000000284	Explosives
2.	ATEL	Airtel Networks (Formerly CELTEL)	Telecoms	ZM0000000342	Telecommunications and mobile money
3.	BATA	Zambia Bata Shoe Company	Consumer Goods	ZM0000000102	Footwear
4.	BATZ	British American Tobacco Zambia	Consumer Goods	ZM0000000029	Tobacco products
5.	CCAF	CEC Africa Investment	Financials	ZM0000000516	Investment, Electric Power
6.	CECZ	Copperbelt Energy Corporation	Utilities	ZM0000000136	Power Generation and Electric Power Transmission
7.	CHIL	Lafarge Zambia (formerly Chilanga Cement)	Industrials	ZM0000000011	Cement and cement clinker Production
8.	MAFS	Madison Financial Services Company	Financials	ZM0000000391	Insurance, Finance
9.	NATB	National Breweries	Consumer Goods	ZM0000000086	Alcoholic beverages
10.	PUMA	Puma Energy Zambia (formerly BP Zambia)	Energy	ZM0000000194	Oil, Gas Production and Petroleum products
11.	REIZ	Real Estate Investments Zambia	Real Estate	ZM0000000045	Real Estate Investment
12.	SCBL	Standard Chartered Bank (Zambia)	Financials	ZM0000000094	Finance, Banking
13.	SHOP (Dual listed - Primary listing JSE)	Shoprite Holdings	Consumer Goods	ZAE000012084	Supermarket Retailing
14.	ZABR	Zambian Breweries	Consumer Goods	ZM0000000078	Alcoholic beverages
15	ZCCM	ZCCM Investment Holdings	Basic Materials	ZM0000000037	Mining Investments. Copper
16.	ZMRE	Zambia Reinsurance	Financials	ZM0000000326	Reinsurance Services
17.	ZMBF	Zambeef Products	Consumer Goods	ZM0000000201	Livestock & Livestock products
18.	ZMFA	Metal Fabricators of Zambia (ZAMEFA)	Industrials	ZM0000000243	Electric Power Cables, Engineering, Applied Electronics
19	ZNCO	Zambia National Commercial Bank	Financials	ZM0000000250	Banking, Finance
20	ZSUG	Zambia Sugar	Consumer Goods	ZM0000000052	Sugar Production
21.	ZFCO	Zambia Forestry and Forest Industries Corporation (ZAFFICO)	Basic Materials	ZM0000000524	Forestry and Paper

== Delistings ==
In 2024 the LuSE recorded two delistings namely Taj Pamodzi Hotel and Investrust Bank Zambia Limited.

== Trading times ==
Trading takes place from Monday to Friday from 10:00 GMT+2 to 14:00 GMT+2. These times exclude public holidays.

== Alternative Market ==
In May 2016, the Lusaka Securities Exchange announced the introduction of the LuSE Alt-M, an alternative market for small and medium-sized enterprise to participate in.

== Green Bonds - Supporting Sustainability Agenda ==
The LuSE has over the period increased its focus on contributing to the agenda of sustainability. This can be seen from the Green Bonds Guidelines that have been issued focussed on addressing climate change and other environmental challenges. These guidelines provide for the issuance of fixed-income securities by companies that seek to raise funds for projects with a positive environmental impact.

As of 2024, the LuSE had one listed Green Bond of over $150m on Copperbelt Energy Corporation (CEC) Zambia, which raised funds for its Itimpi Solar Power Station project. Which was issued in tranches of $50m in 2023 and $100m in 2024.

== Raising Debt on the LuSE ==
The LuSE listing requirements allow for the issuance of Bonds by corporate companies for purposes relating to a company’s strategic objective. The bonds provide capital in exchange for a series of interest payments to the bondholder.

As at November 2024, the following were the running Corporate Bonds on the LuSE.

Name	ISIN	Value	Yield	Maturity Date	Status
Real Estate Investments Zambia	ZM2000000181	$4,190,537.09	5.5%	26-11-2027	Running
IZWE-MTN 22A	ZM2000001163	K69,141,000	23.5%	31.07.2027	Running
Bayport Financial Services MTNP	ZM2000001072	K50,047,000	364TB + 500 Basis Points per Annum	31/05/2026	Running
Bayport Financial Services MTNP	ZM2000001080	K58,535,000	364TB + 575 Basis Points per Annum	31/05/2028	Running
Bayport Financial Services MTNP	ZM2000001098	K93,700,000	364TB + 500 Basis Points per Annum	31/05/2026	Running
Bayport Financial Services MTNP	ZM2000001106	K5,000,000	364TB + 500 Basis Points per Annum	07/07/2026	Running
Bayport Financial Services MTNP	ZM2000001114	K21,465,000	364TB + 575 Basis Points per Annum	07/07/2028	Running
International Finance Corporation	ZM2000001122	K32,200,000	182TB - 50 Basis Points per Annum	20/06/2028	Running
International Finance Corporation	ZM2000001130	K234,000,000	18%	20/06/2028	Running
CEC Renewables	ZM2000001171	$53,538,000	9%	21/12/2038	Running
CEC Renewables	ZM2000001189	$96,728,000	8.23%	05/12/2039	Running
Bayport Financial Services MTNP	ZM2000001148	K43,650,000	364TB + 500 Basis Points per Annum	08/12/2026	Running
Bayport Financial Services MTNP	ZM2000001155	K8,500,000	364TB + 575 Basis points per Annum%	08/12/2028	Running

== Approved Brokers on LuSE ==
The Exchange has two categories of brokers namely the trading brokers and sponsoring brokers.

== See also ==
- Economy of Zambia
- List of African stock exchanges
- List of stock exchanges
- Gold as an investment
- List of countries by copper production
- List of companies in Zambia
