= Zambian Breweries =

Zambia-based beverage company

Zambian Breweries Plc
- Type: Listed
- Traded as: LuSE: ZABR
- Industry: Alcoholic beverages
- Predecessor: Zambian Breweries, Zambia Bottlers, Copperbelt Bottling, Northern Breweries
- Founded: 1963
- Headquarters: Plot 6438, Mungwi Road, Heavy Industrial Area, Lusaka, Zambia
- Key people: Monica Musonda (Chair); Michelle Kilpin (Country Director); Obed Somali (Chief Financial Officer)
- Products: Production and distribution of clear beer and soft drinks
- Production output: 2.3 million hl
- Revenue: ▲ZMW 3,068,959,000; (2021); ZMW 2,305,425,000; (2020)
- Net income: ▲ZMW 147,952,000; (2021); ZMW 5,939,000; (2020)
- Total assets: ▲ZMW 3,578,033,000; (2021); ZMW 3,232,039,000; (2020)
- Total equity: ▲ZMW 1,139,004,000; (2021); ZMW 991,052,000; (2020)
- Owner: Anheuser-Busch InBev (ABInBev)
- Number of employees: 940 (2019)
- Parent: ABInBev

Zambian Breweries Plc is part of Anheuser-Busch InBev (ABInBev), the largest brewer in the world, with more than 400 beer brands and some 200,000 employees in over 50 countries.

Zambian Breweries was established in Zambia in 1968 and its product range has grown to include clear beers such as Mosi Lager, Castle, Carling Black Label, Eagle, Corona, Stella Artois, Budweiser, Flying Fish and Castle Lite.

== History ==
In 1963, Northern Breweries Limited was established as a private company formed through a partnership between South African Breweries (SAB) holding an 80% stake and Labatt Breweries of Canada with a 20% share. The company commenced brewing operations with plants located in Ndola and Lusaka.

By 1968, the company was nationalised by the Zambian government, resulting in its division into Zambian Breweries (Lusaka) and Northern Breweries (Ndola). It was subsequently renamed Zambian Breweries Limited.

The privatisation of Zambian Breweries began in 1994. This transition paved the way for its listing on the LuSE in 1997.

In 1999, Zambian Breweries expanded by acquiring Northern Breweries in Ndola, along with the brand Rhino Lager. Three years later, in 2002, the company further diversified by acquiring the Coca-Cola franchise for Zambia, establishing bottling plants in Kitwe and Lusaka.

December 2016 saw a significant shift when ABInBev, after acquiring SABMiller, agreed to sell its African Coca-Cola bottling operations, including the Zambian operation owned by Zambrew, to Coca-Cola for an undisclosed amount.

In July 2022, Zambian Breweries announced a substantial US$80 million expansion of its Lusaka plant.

=== Brands ===
- Mosi Lager,
- Eagle Lager,
- Eagle Maize Lager,
- Castle Lager,
- Castle Lite,
- Carling Black Label,
- Flying Fish,
- Stella Artois,
- Budweiser

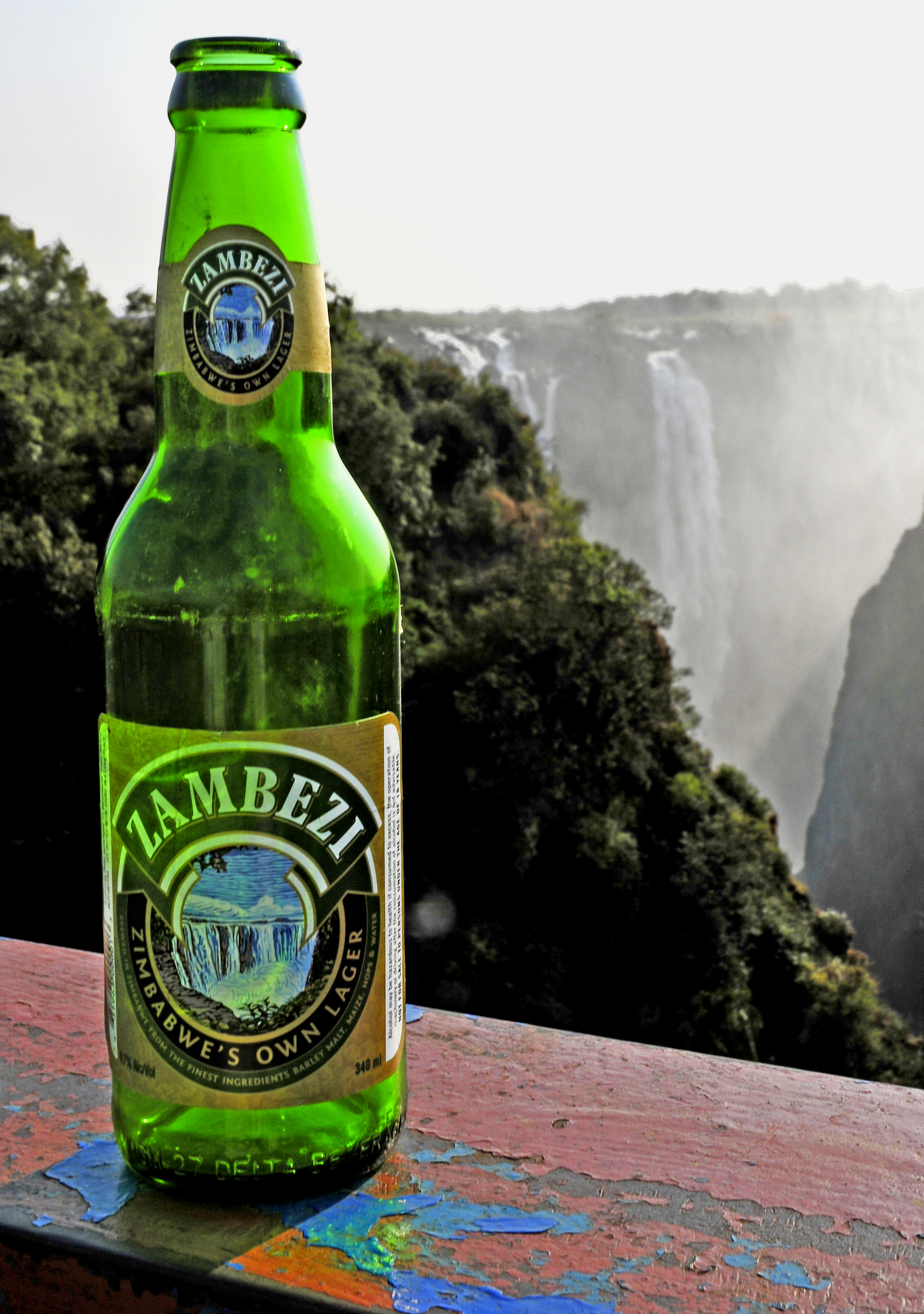

The company has a virtual monopoly on clear brew products in Zambia.

=== Finance ===
As of 31 December 2021, the company's total assets were ZMW 3,578,033,000, with shareholders' equity of ZMW 1,139,004,000.

For the fiscal (and calendar) year 2021, Zambian Breweries reported a net income of ZMW 147,952,000. The annual revenue was ZMW 3,068,959,000, an increase over the previous fiscal year.

Zambian Breweries is listed on the LuSE. Zambian Breweries is traded on the LuSE under the ticker symbol “ZABR”.

Zambian Breweries Plc was the best performing stock in January 2022 on the LuSE after posting over ZMW 21.6 million, in turnover.

Zambian Breweries is currently the sixth most valuable stock on the LuSE with a market capitalization of ZMW 3.82 billion as of 14 April 2022.

== Financial history ==
In 1998, Zambian Breweries made a 100 percent takeover bid for what was then Northern Breweries, now National Breweries. The Zambian Competition Commission only gave tentative approval to the merger. Both breweries are listed on the LuSE in 2006.

Two balance sheets are published. But both breweries are constantly confused in financial reporting and "insider" financial services, making attribution of information immensely difficult. The reason for this may lie in the same major shareholder.

In 2017, the LuSE awarded the Zambian Breweries Plc the coveted Corporate Governance Awards for 2017 and 2017.
