= Zambia Sugar =

Zambian sugar manufacturing company

Coordinates: 15°49′58″S 27°46′53″E

Zambia Sugar Plc
- Company type: Public
- Traded as: Lusaka Stock Exchange:ZSUG
- Industry: Agriculture
- Headquarters: Mazabuka, Zambia
- Area served: Zambia, Africa
- Key people: Rebecca Katowa; Chief Executive Officer(Retired): Oswald Magwenzi; (Chief Executive Officer)(2021-)Norman Mbazima(Chairman)
- Products: Sugar; Sugar marketing
- Revenue: ▲ZMW 4,989,980,000; (U$285 million)(2021)
- Net income: ▲ZMW 1,006,130,000; (US$57 million)(2021)
- Total assets: ▲ZMW 4,402,412,000; (US$251 million)(2021)
- Total equity: ▲ZMW 2,577,814,000; (US$147 million)(2021)
- Number of employees: 6,179 (2021)
- Website: Homepage

Zambia Sugar Plc is the largest sugar-manufacturing company in Zambia, with annual output in excess of 318,467 tonnes (351,050 tons) of crystalline sugar annually, as of November 2018. The company stock is listed on the Lusaka Stock Exchange under the symbol ZSUG.

During the financial year ended 31 August 2021, sugar production grew to 397,032 tonnes.

== Location ==
The company headquarters are located in the town of Mazabuka, in Mazabuka District, in the Southern Province, Zambia. The company owns, operates and maintains Nakambala Sugar Estates, located in Nakambala, a suburb of Mazabuka, approximately 141 kilometres (88 mi) by road, southwest of Lusaka, the national capital and largest city in Zambia. The geographical coordinates of Nakambala are:15°49'58.0"S, 27°46'53.0"E (Latitude:-15.832778; Longitude:27.781389).

== Overview ==
As of 31 December 2019, the company's total assets were ZMW:3,949,763,000 (US$217 million), with shareholders' equity of ZMW:1,412,679,000 (US$78 million).

== History ==
The Nakambala Sugar Estate was founded in 1964 by Tate & Lyle Limited, on the southeastern edge of the Kafue Flats at Mazabuka. By 1968 the estate was growing sugar cane on 1,680 hectares (4,200 acres), using the sugar mill which had been moved from Tate & Lyle's failed sugar operation at Chirundu and irrigation water from the Kafue River. By 1976 the estate was producing 68,000 tonnes (74,957 tons) of sugar from 6,650 hectares (16,400 acres) under cultivation. Production rose to over 90,000 tonnes (99,208 tons) of refined sugar from 9,000 hectares (22,239 acres) of farmland, by 1983.

In 1972 the Zambia Sugar Company Limited, which operated the estate, was nationalised and Industrial Development Corporation of Zambia (then abbreviated INDECO) acquired 51 percent of the shares of the company, while Tate and Lyle retained 49 percent. In 1975 INDECO raised their stake to 75 percent, with Tate and Lyle retaining 11 percent, with the remaining 14 percent being taken up by other private investors.

In 1995 Zambia Sugar Company Limited was repurchased by Tate & Lyle, who increased their stake to 51 percent, Commonwealth Development Corporation (CDC Group) took up 31 percent and the remaining 18 percent was acquired by Zambia Privatisation Trust Fund. In 1996 the company floated its shares of stock on the Lusaka Stock Exchange as Zambia Sugar Plc. In 2001 Tate and Lyle sold its interest in Zambia Sugar Plc to Illovo Sugar of South Africa. Illovo made an offer to minority shareholders, as required by Zambian law, and increased shareholding to 90 percent. By 2006, sugar production had increased to 240,000 tons annually.

Between 2007 and 2010 the company implemented a major expansion program and increased the area in production from 11,000 hectares (42 mi^{2}) to nearly 17,000 hectares (66 mi^{2}) of irrigated farmland. In 2009, Zambia Sugar Plc acquired a controlling interest in Nanga Farms Plc, who owned sugar farms adjacent to Nakambala with production capacity in excess of 350,000 tones of raw cane annually. That same year, Illovo reduced shareholding to 81.6 percent. Illovo Group Holding Limited reduced shareholding in Zambia Sugar Plc to 75 percent in 2014, to comply with new rules at the Lusaka Stock Exchange.

As of 14 April 2022, Zambia Sugar is currently the third most valuable stock on the Lusaka Stock Exchange with a market capitalization of ZMW 5.59 billion.

== Operations ==
In 2013, the company launched the Manyonyo Outgrower Scheme, an initiative of the government of Zambia, funded by the government of Finland and the African Development Bank. It involves 145 small-sale farmers who grow sugarcane on their land and sell the raw cane to the company.

As of 2014, Zambia Sugar Public Limited Company employed 6,014 people, some of whom were permanent, others temporary and still others were seasonal.

In 2021, the Company's revenue grew to a record high of ZMW 4,989 billion up from ZMW 3,335 billion recorded the previous year. And after 24 years of service, Rebecca Katowa retired as MD Zambia Sugar Plc. Rebecca is succeeded by Oswald Magwenzi former Managing Director Ubombo Sugar.

== Ownership ==
The shares of stock of Zambia Sugar Plc are listed on the Lusaka Stock Exchange, where they trade under the symbol: ZSUG. The table below illustrates the shareholding in the company as of 31 August 2017.

Zambia Sugar Plc Stock Ownership
Rank	Name of Owner	Percentage Ownership
1	Illovo Group Holdings Limited	76.40
2	Pension Funds	18.10
3	Zambian Companies	4.10
4	Zambian Individuals	1.10
5	Non-Zambian Individuals	0.20
6	Non-Zambian companies	0.10
	Total	100.00

== See also ==
- Zambia Sugar Open
