= United States–Africa Leaders Summit 2014 =

Leaders from African sovereign nations attend summit hosted by Obama

US–Africa Leaders Summit 2014
- Host country: United States
- Date: August 4–6, 2014
- Motto: Investing in the Next Generation
- Cities: Washington, D.C.
- Venues: Mandarin Oriental Hotel; White House; Harry S Truman Building
- Participants: Barack Obama; 50 African leaders (incl. 37 HOS); U.S. Business Executives
- Precedes: United States–Africa Leaders Summit 2022
- Website: Official website

The United States–Africa Leaders Summit 2014 was an international summit held in Washington D.C. from August 4–6, 2014. Leaders from fifty African states attended the three-day summit, which was hosted by U.S. President Barack Obama. The summit primarily focused on trade, investment and security of the continent. Leaders from 50 of the 54 existing African sovereign nations were invited to attend. After the summit, the White House produced a number of Fact Sheets that summarized major outcomes.

== Background ==
In 2013, President Barack Obama made his three-nation tour of Africa, in which he announced his plans to host a summit of leaders from across Africa. America's annual trade with the continent is about $85 billion compared to China's $200 billion. According to an interview with The Economist, Obama welcomed foreign investment in the continent saying "the more the merrier" and advised African leaders to ensure that local workers benefit from the infrastructure projects and that the roads shouldn't "just lead from the mine, to the port, to Shanghai."

On July 31, 2014, four days before the beginning of the summit, there was an On-the-Record-Conference Press Call released by the White House Office of the Press Secretary that included discussions and details of the conference. The participants were (1) Ben Rhodes, Deputy National Security Advisor for Strategic Communications; (2) Linda Thomas-Greenfield, Assistant Secretary of State for African Affairs; and (3) Gayle Smith, Senior Director for Development and Democracy at the National Security Council.

== Agenda ==
The summit focused on trade and investment and underlined the United States' commitment to the continent's people, democracy and security. It facilitated the discussion on how to deepen these partnerships. US Commerce Secretary Penny Pritzker said that new deals worth about $900 million would be announced at the summit.

A number of organizations have written to President Obama to draw particular attention to the rights of LGBT Africans. The Human Rights Campaign and Human Rights First issued a statement urging Obama to include the discrimination against this minority in the agenda and described this summit as a 'once-in-a-generation moment' to promote equality. Homosexuality is criminalized in 37 Africans states. It is punishable by death in five African countries: Mauritania, Nigeria, Somalia, Uganda, and Sudan; and up to life imprisonment in Sierra Leone, Tanzania, and Zambia. Only South Africa grants full marriage equality and constitutional protection against discrimination.

A Program of Events was released on the White House website. Even though the first ever U.S.-Africa Leaders Summit was held from Monday August 4 to Wednesday August 6, there were a great number of side events around the Summit. On Friday August 1 a Signature Event – Faith works: Honoring the contributions of the Faith Community to Peace and Prosperity in Africa took place. This included religious leaders, faith-based organization, African leaders and U.S. Government officials. The role the faith based community plays in promoting peace, prosperity and development all over Africa was discussed. The U.S.-Africa Leaders were given opportunities to contribute.

August 4 Signature Events – (1) Civil Society Forum; (2) Investing in Women, Peace and Prosperity; (3) Investing in Health: Investing in Africa's Future; (4) Resilience and Food Security in a Changing Climate; and (5) Combating Wildlife Trafficking. Other events included The African Growth and Opportunity Act (AGOA) Forum which was discussed in order to pursue efforts to renew legislation. A Capital Hill Reception was held by the Senate Foreign Relations and House Foreign Affairs Committees to welcome African Leaders in the afternoon.

=== US–Africa Business Forum ===
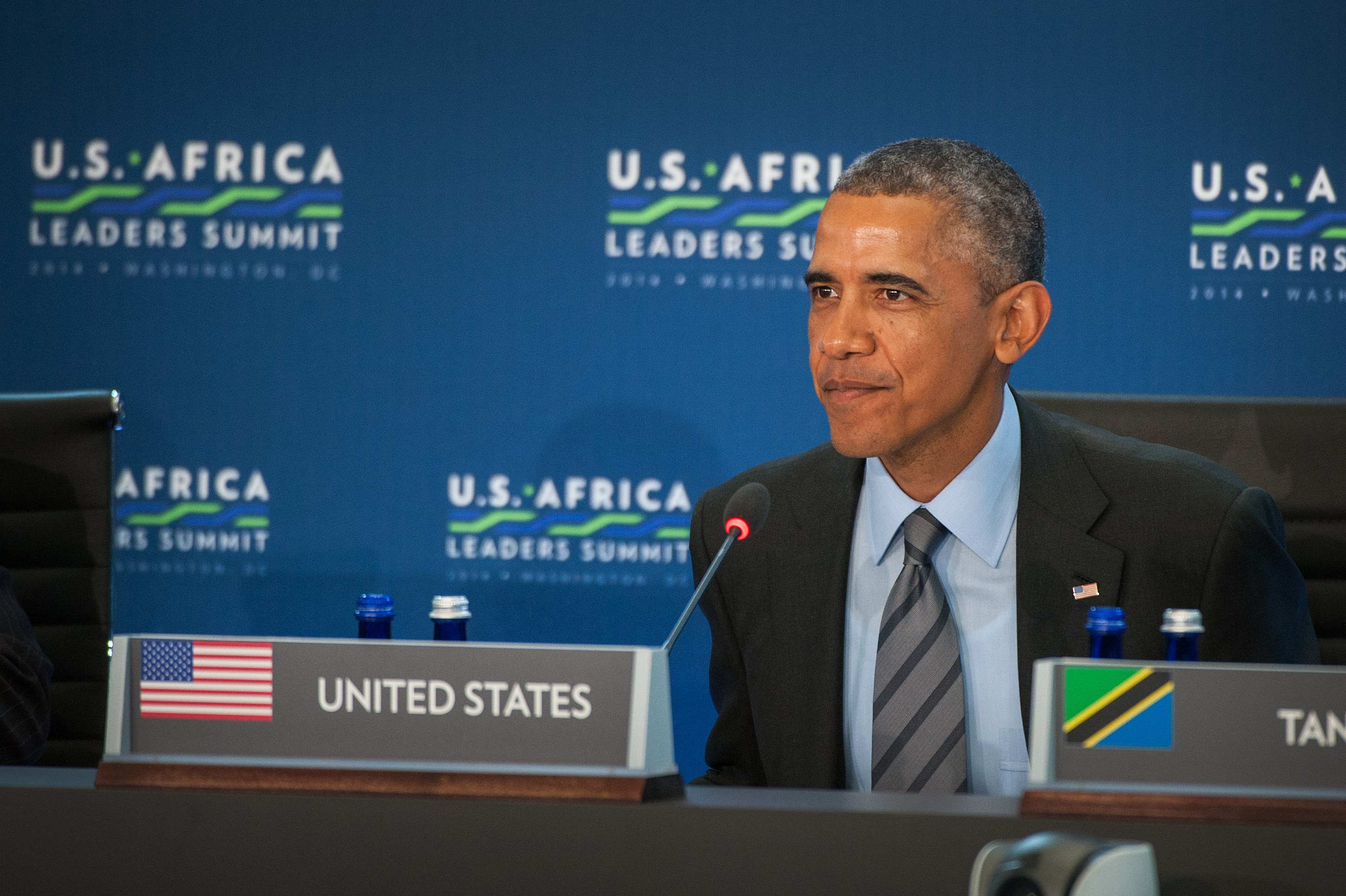
Obama Delivers remarks.

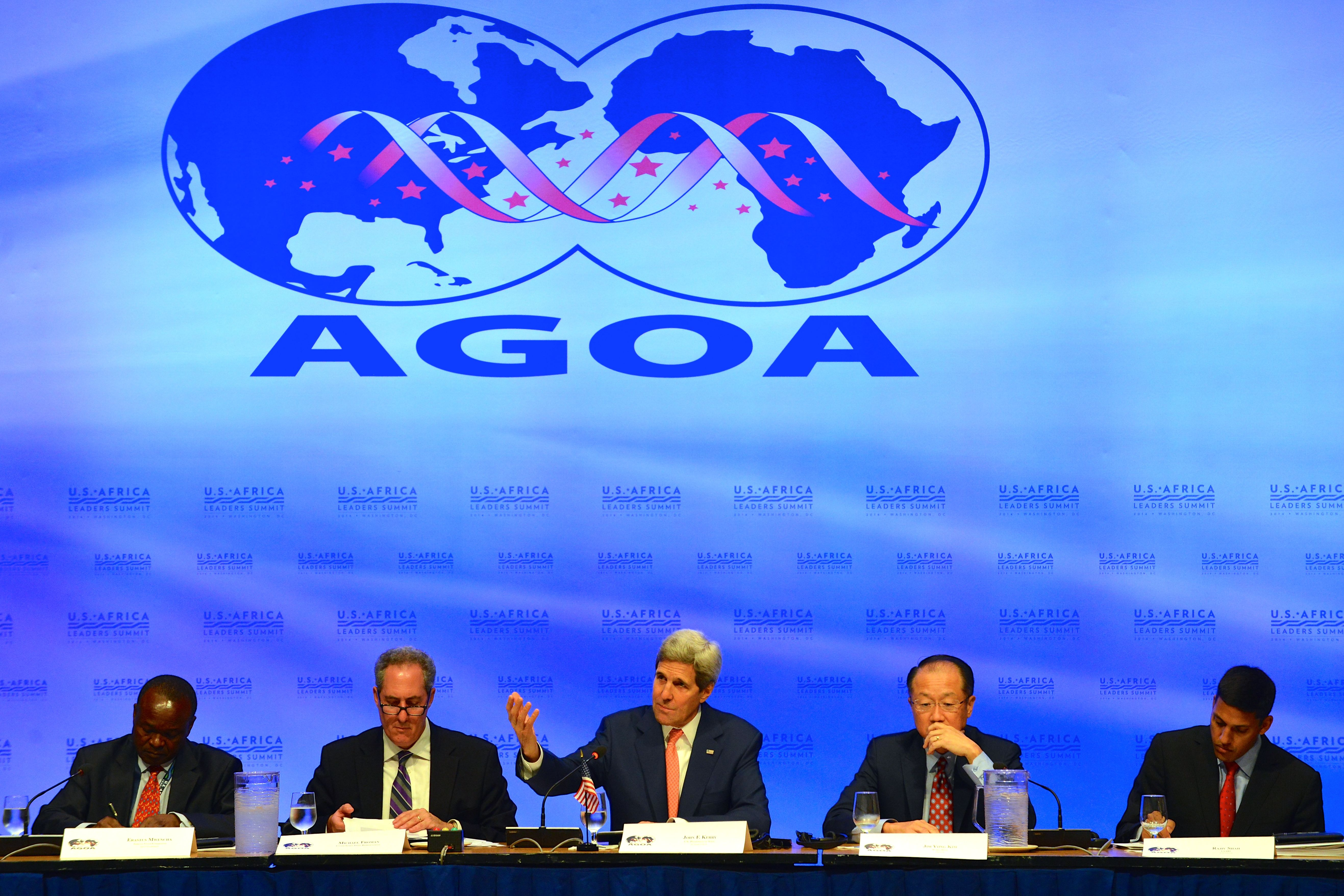
Secretary Kerry delivering his remarks at the World Bank.

On August 5 the U.S. Department of Commerce and Bloomberg Philanthropies co-hosted the first ever U.S.-Africa Business Forum. The focus was on strengthening trade and financial ties between the United States and Africa. Good morning and welcome remarks were given by Penny Pritzker, United States Secretary of Commerce and Michael Bloomberg, Founder of Bloomberg Philanthropies, Bloomberg L.P. and the 108th Mayor of New York City. The Business Forum was divided into four moderated sessions.

Session 1: Expanding Opportunities: The New Era For Business in Africa. Session 1 explored the U.S.-African partnerships and identified new ways to strengthen business ties and enable greater economic progress. Ashish J. Thakkar, Founder and Managing Director of Mara Group welcomed the panel. Bill Clinton 42nd President of the United States and Founder of the Clinton Foundation was the Moderator. The five speakers were: Aliko Dangote, President and CEO Dangote Group, Jeff Immelt, CEO General Electric, Andrew N. Liveris, President, Chairman and CEO The Dow Chemical Company, Phuti Mahanyele CEO Shanduka Group and Doug McMillon President and CEO Walmart Stores Inc. Prior to the second session, remarks were given by the Chairperson of the African Union Commission, Dr. Nkosazana Dlamini-Zuma.

Session 2: Open Markets: Financing The Africa of Tomorrow. Session 2 explored the trends guiding successful and good governance in African countries, reduction of risks, strengthening investor confidence and increasing availability of U.S. capital to African and U.S. firms intending to partner on the African continent. Jacob J. Lew, Secretary of the Treasury of the United States welcomed the panel. Donald Kaberuka, President of the African Development Bank was the Moderator. The six speakers were: Ajay Banga, President and CEO Mastercard, Tony Elumelu, Chairman Heirs Holdings Limited, James Mwangi, CEO Equity Bank Group, David Rubenstein, CEO The Carlyle Group, Sim Tshabalala, Joint CEO Standard Bank and Mo Ibrahim, Founder and Chair, Mo Ibrahim Foundation.

Session 3: Powering Africa: Leading Developments in Infrastructure. Session 3 explored public-private partnerships, technological innovations and financing tools that are transforming energy, transport and digital infrastructure in Africa. Dr. Jim Yong Kim, President of the World Bank Group welcomed the panel. Susan Rice, Assistant to the President and National Security Advisor was the Moderator. The five speakers were: Muhtar Kent, Chairman of the Board, CEO The Coca-Cola Company, Tshepo Mahloele CEO Harith Fund Managers, Strive Masiyiwa, Founder and Chairman Econet Wireless, Virginia Ginni Rometty, Chairman, President and CEO of IBM and Stephen Schwarzman, Chairman, CEO and Co-Founder of Blackstone. Afternoon remarks were given by Joseph Biden, Vice President of the United States.

Session 4: Game Plan: Shaping The Future Of A Fast-Growing Continent. Session 4 featured the African Heads of State. The assembled leaders represented the continents five regions. The discussion entailed policies that enable economic growth, intelligent infrastructure and successful private and public partnerships for the present and all the future years ahead. John Kerry, Secretary of State of the United States welcomed the panel. Charlie Rose was the Moderator. The five president speakers were: Paul Kagame, President of the Republic of Rwanda, Macky Sall, President of the Republic of Senegal, Jacob Zuma, President of the Republic of South Africa, Jakaya Mrisho Kikwete, President of the United Republic of Tanzania and Mohamed Moncef Marzouki, President of the Republic of Tunisia. Remarks were delivered by President Obama and Vice President Biden during the U.S.-Africa Business Forum.

Penny Pritzker and Michael Bloomberg co-wrote to a Forbes Opinion article where they stated that the inaugural U.S.-Africa Business Forum was expected to stimulate $14 Billion worth of business.

In the evening, President Obama and the First Lady hosted a Dinner Reception at the White House for the African Leaders, government and select guests. Among the attendees at the dinner was former President Jimmy Carter.

=== Summit Leaders Meetings ===
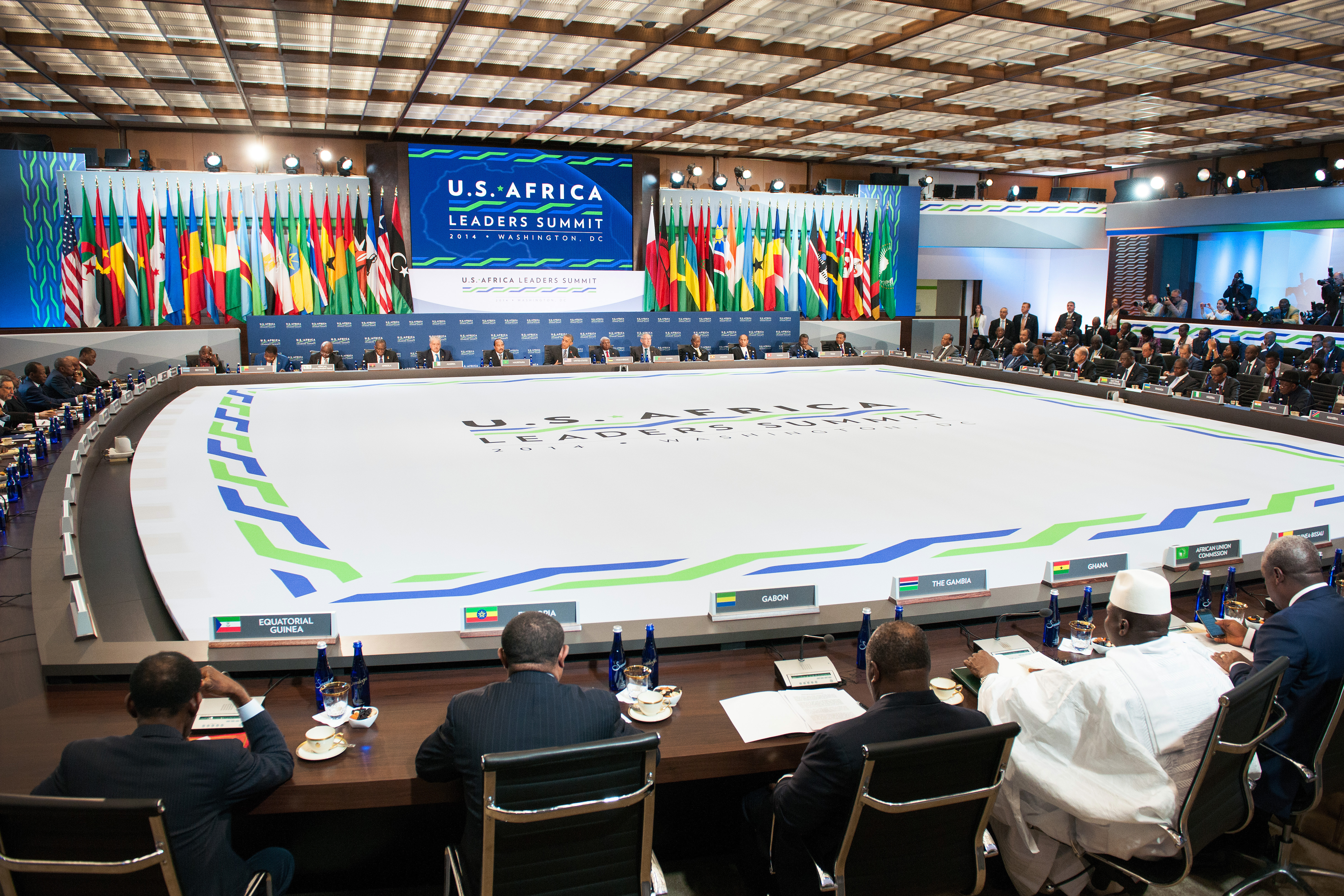
A session in progress

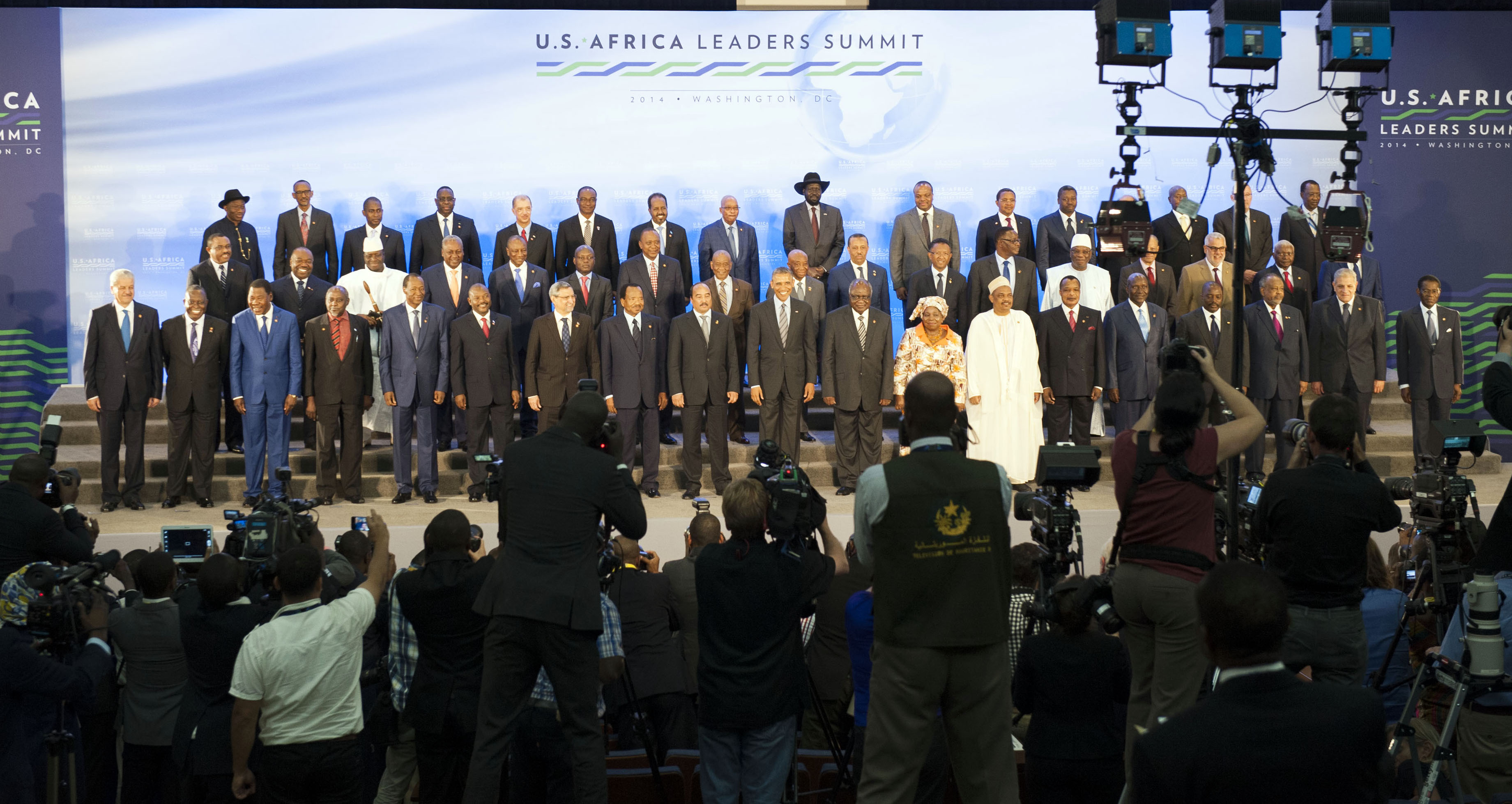
President Obama participates in a family photo with African leaders.

On August 6 the Summit Leaders Meetings took place. President Obama and African Leaders engaged in dialogue in three action-oriented sessions that addressed issues of shared common interest and mutual concern. Session 1: Investing in Africa's Future – inclusive sustainable development, economic growth and trade and investment were discussed. Session 2: Peace and Regional Stability – a working lunch centered around long-term solutions to regional conflict, peace keeping challenges and combating transnational threats. Session 3: Governing For The Next Generation – the focus was on how to enhance governance in order to deliver services to citizens and to attract and prepare for increased domestic and foreign direct trade and investment.

The Summit concluded with President Obama holding a press conference. He called the U.S.-Africa Leaders Summit "an extraordinary event"

Other events of the final day were: (1) A Spousal Program accompanied by the tag line "Investing in Our Future at the U.S.-Africa Leaders Summit" hosted by First Lady Michelle Obama in partnership with former First Lady, Laura Bush and the Bush Institute. This day-long spouses symposium which was held at the Kennedy Center focused on the impact of investments in education, health and public-private partnerships. The 43rd President of the United States, George W. Bush made an appearance, he sat with the African First Ladies and drew applause when he said "If you're worried about your husbands' political future, taking care of women is good politics." As a father and grand father he "is concerned about the future, not less" when it comes to freedom, economic empowerment and health of girls and women around the world. Jill Biden delivered remarks earlier on and also spoke about creating opportunities for young women leaders.

(2) A Dialogue with African CEO's hosted by Congressman Gregory W. Meeks and the Congressional Black Caucus Africa Task Force entailed panel discussions and networking with African business and political leaders, U.S. private sector representatives and members of congress.

== Participants ==
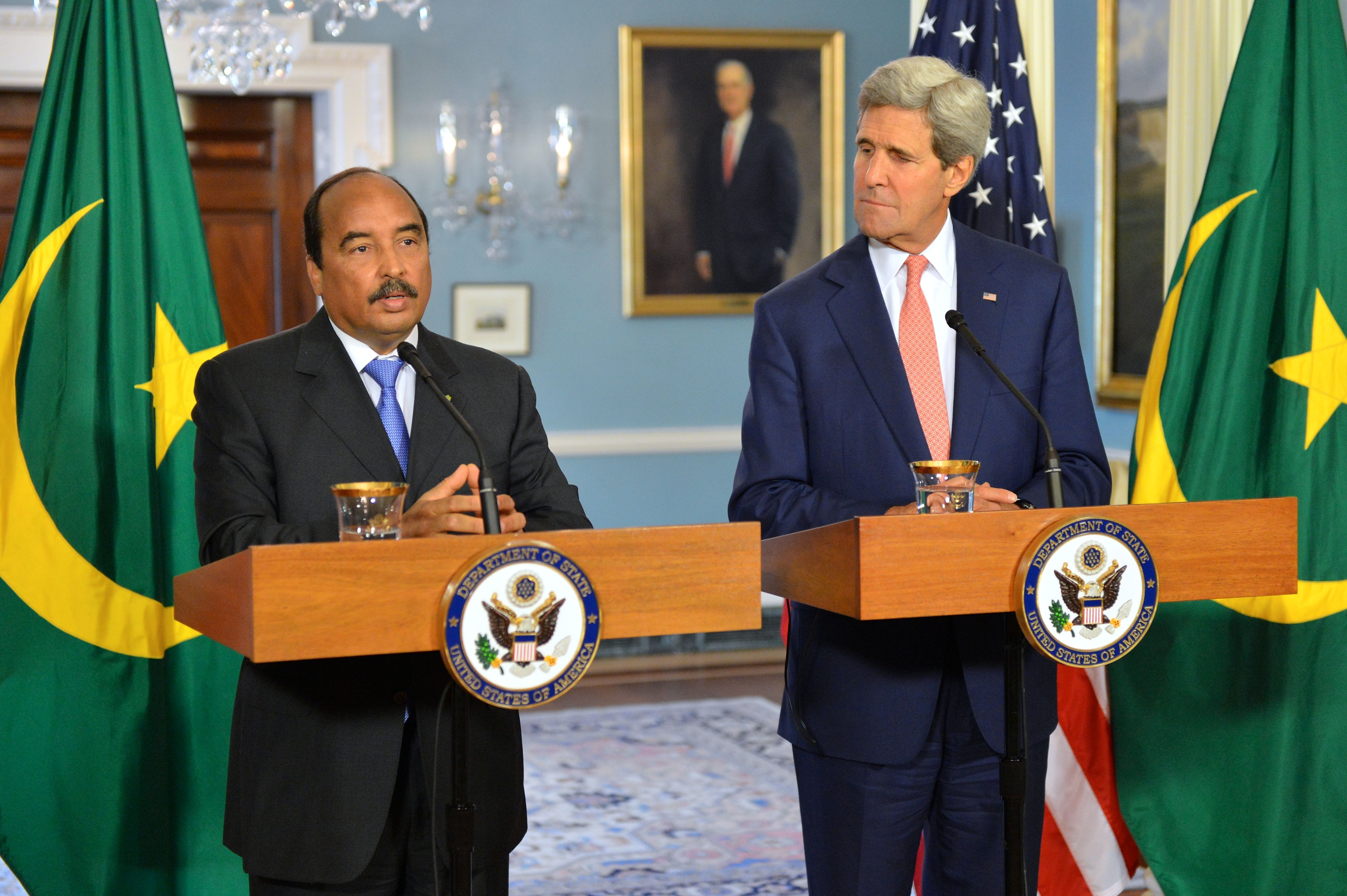
Kerry with the Chairperson of the African Union, Abdel Aziz

The map of the countries that participated in the summit

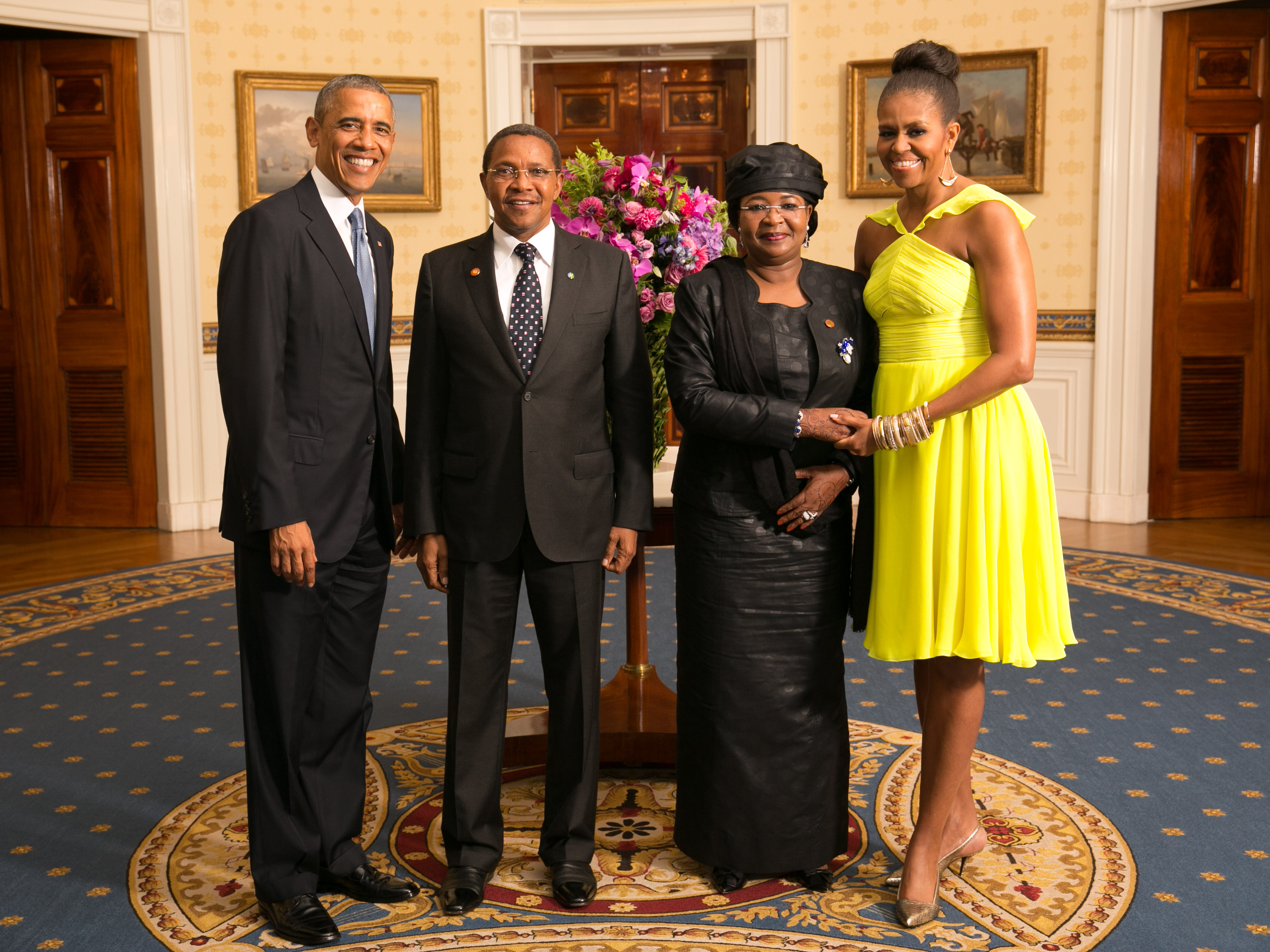
Obamas with Tanzanian President Kikwete and First Lady Salma Kikwete

Africa consists of 54 sovereign states; in 2014, all of them, with the exception of Morocco, were members of the African Union. Invitations were extended to fifty African leaders who are "in good standing" with both the US and the African Union. Nkosazana Dlamini-Zuma, the Chairperson of the African Union Commission was also invited. President Obama met the leaders "as a group", and not on an individual basis. Of the fifty leaders, thirty-seven were Heads of State.

=== Dignitaries ===
Country	Title	Leader
Algeria	Prime Minister	Abdelmalek Sellal
Angola	Vice President	Manuel Vicente
Benin	President	Yayi Boni
Botswana	Foreign Minister	Phandu Skelemani
Burkina Faso	President	Blaise Compaoré
Burundi	President	Pierre Nkurunziza
Cape Verde	President	Jorge Carlos Fonseca
Chad	President	Idriss Déby
Cameroon	President	Paul Biya
Comoros	President	Ikililou Dhoinine
Cote d'Ivoire	Prime Minister	Daniel Kablan Duncan
Congo–Brazzaville	President	Denis Sassou Nguesso
Djibouti	President	Ismaïl Omar Guelleh
DR Congo	President	Joseph Kabila
Egypt	Prime Minister	Ibrahim Mahlab
Equatorial Guinea	President	Teodoro Obiang Nguema Mbasogo
Ethiopia	Prime Minister	Hailemariam Desalegn
Gabon	President	Ali Bongo Ondimba
Gambia	President	Yahya Jammeh
Ghana	President	John Dramani Mahama
Guinea	President	Alpha Condé
Guinea-Bissau	President	José Mário Vaz
Kenya	President	Uhuru Kenyatta
Lesotho	Prime Minister	Tom Thabane
Liberia	Vice President	Joseph Boakai
Libya	Prime Minister	Abdullah al-Thani
Madagascar	President	Hery Rajaonarimampianina
Malawi	President	Peter Mutharika
Mali	President	Ibrahim Boubacar Keïta
Mauritania	President	Mohamed Ould Abdel Aziz
Mauritius	Prime Minister	Navin Ramgoolam
Morocco	Prime Minister	Abdelilah Benkirane
Mozambique	President	Armando Guebuza
Namibia	President	Hifikepunye Pohamba
Niger	President	Mahamadou Issoufou
Nigeria	President	Goodluck Jonathan
Rwanda	President	Paul Kagame
São Tomé and Príncipe	Prime Minister	Gabriel Costa
Senegal	President	Macky Sall
Seychelles	President	James Michel
Sierra Leone	Foreign Minister	Samura Kamara
Somalia	President	Hassan Sheikh Mohamud
South Africa	President	Jacob Zuma
South Sudan	President	Salva Kiir
Eswatini	King	Mswati III
Tanzania	President	Jakaya Kikwete
Togo	President	Faure Gnassingbe
Tunisia	President	Moncef Marzouki
Uganda	President	Yoweri Museveni
Zambia	Vice President	Guy Scott

=== Non–attendance ===
Country	Head of State	Reason
Algeria	President Abdelaziz Bouteflika	health reasons
Angola	President José Eduardo dos Santos	
Botswana	President Ian Khama	
Egypt	President Abdel Fattah el-Sisi	
Liberia	President Ellen Johnson Sirleaf	due to an Ebola outbreak
Lesotho	King Letsie III	
Morocco	King Mohammed VI	
Sierra Leone	President Ernest Bai Koroma	due to an Ebola outbreak
Zambia	President Michael Sata	health reasons
Cote d'Ivoire	President Alassane Ouattara	

=== Exclusions ===
- Central African Republic – interim President Catherine Samba-Panza was not invited as her country was at the time suspended from the African Union (AU) following the 2013 coup d'état. An election was held in December 2015 and February 2016.
- Eritrea – President Isaias Afwerki was excluded and the White House cited the UN sanction on the country and its refusal to accept full diplomatic relations with the U.S.
- Sahrawi Arab Democratic Republic (Western Sahara) – President Mohamed Abdelaziz was omitted as the U.S. does not recognize his country.
- Sudan – President Omar al-Bashir was excluded as he is indicted at the International Criminal Court, which also issued an arrest warrant for him. The Department of State lists Sudan as one of the state sponsors of terrorism. The Sudanese government criticized its exclusion. The Deputy Speaker disagreed with the U.S. stance on her country.
- Zimbabwe – A U.S. official was reported to have said that President Robert Mugabe was not invited because he is currently on the list of the Specially Designated Nationals. Information Minister Jonathan Moyo dismissed the summit as a "non-event" saying that the U.S. was afraid of China. Mugabe's spokesman, George Charamba, was quoted to have said that they were not bothered as the "world is larger than America."

Temporary

At the time of the announcement of the summit in January 2014, the following three states were suspended from the African Union due to their political situation. They have since been re-admitted following the restoration of democracy and rule of law:

- Egypt – was suspended from the AU following the 2013 coup d'état. The Egyptian Foreign Ministry spokesman stated that this decision was "wrong and short-sighted". Following the successful presidential election in May 2014, the US extended a late invite.
- Guinea-Bissau – was suspended following the 2012 coup d'état Election was held in April 2014.
- Madagascar – at the time the invitations were sent out, the country was suspended because of the 2009 coup d'état. On 28 January 2014, the AU lifted its sanctions following the successful election

== Controversies ==
The list of invited leaders included the following long serving African strongmen:

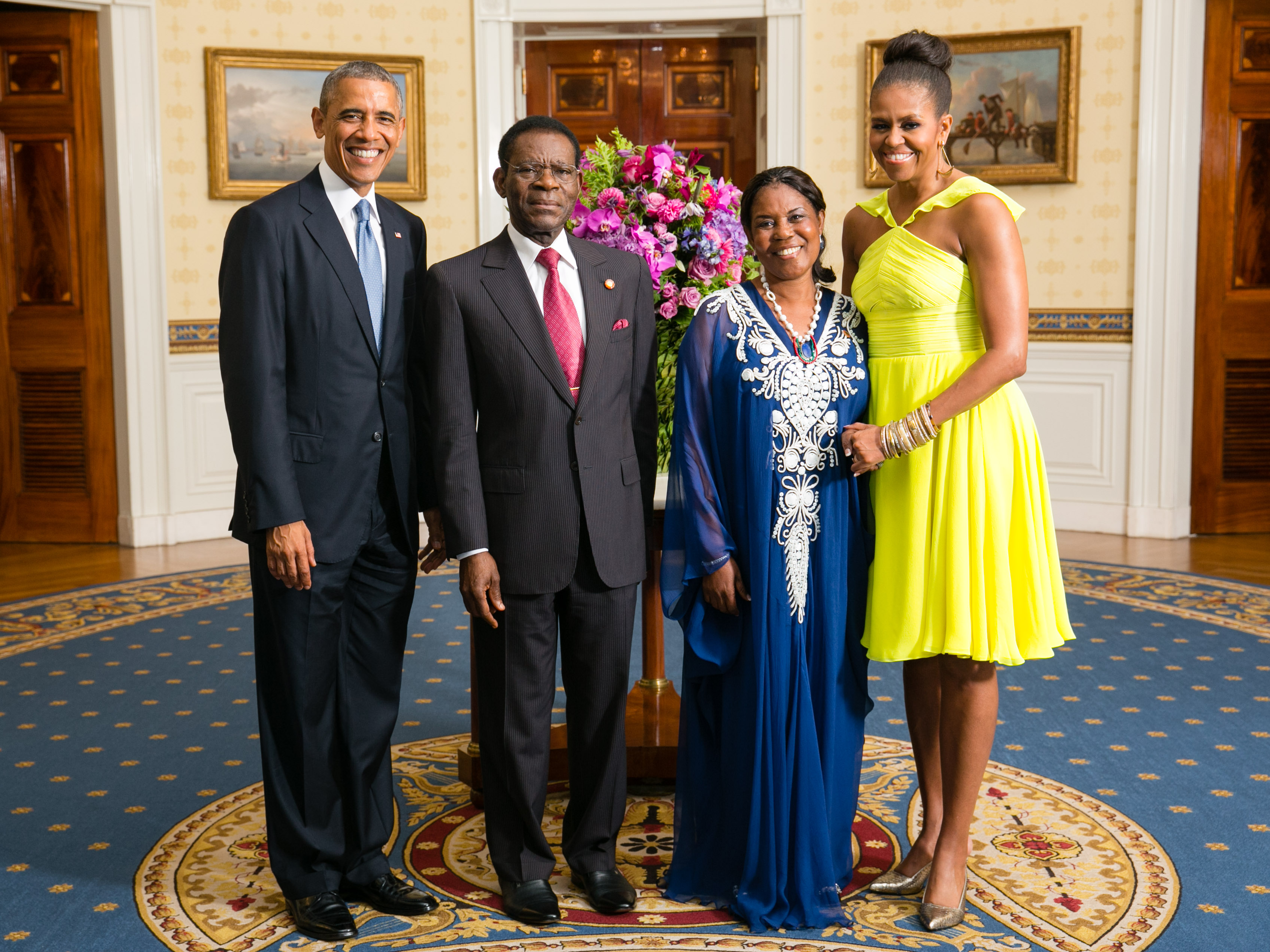
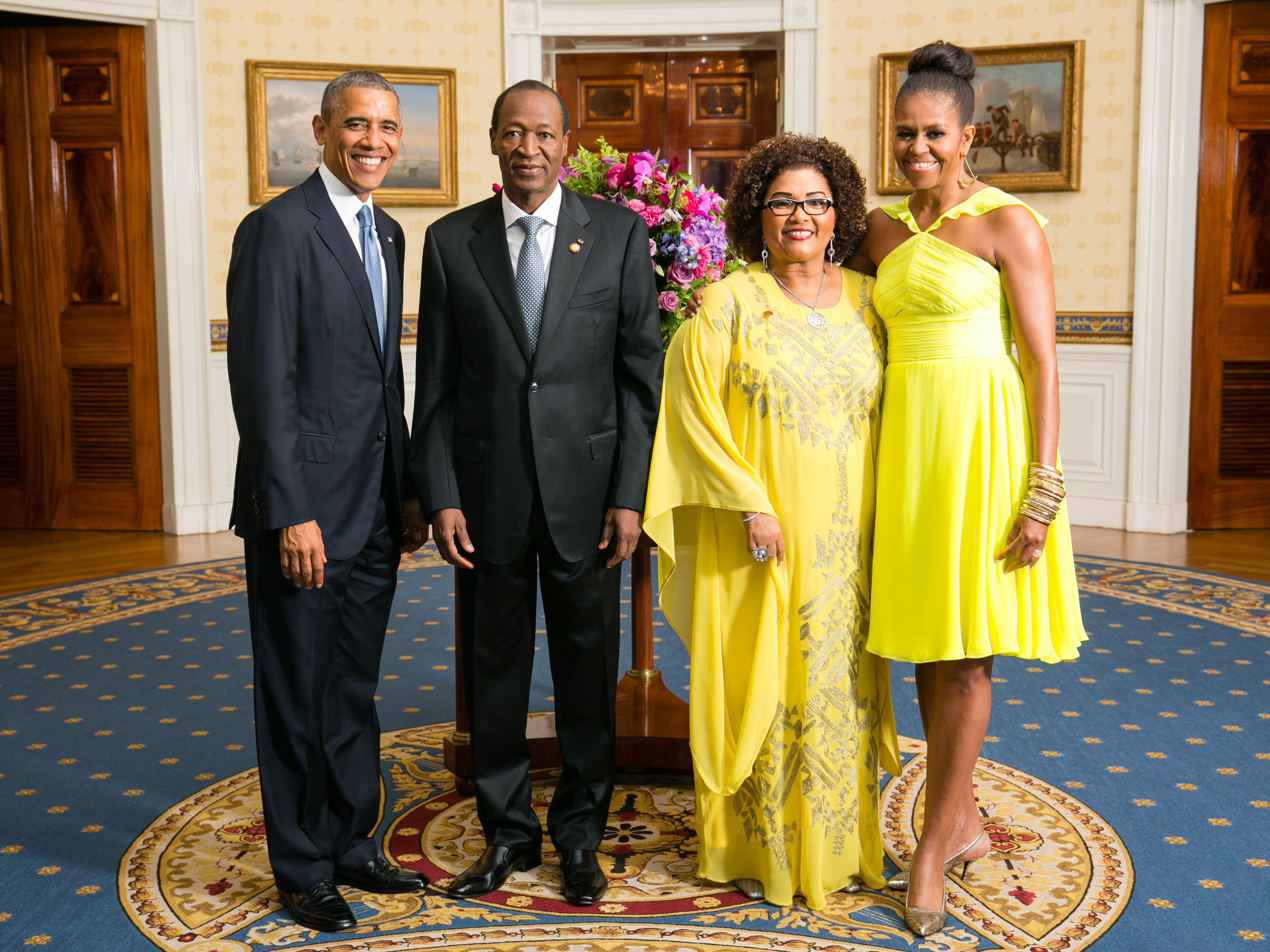
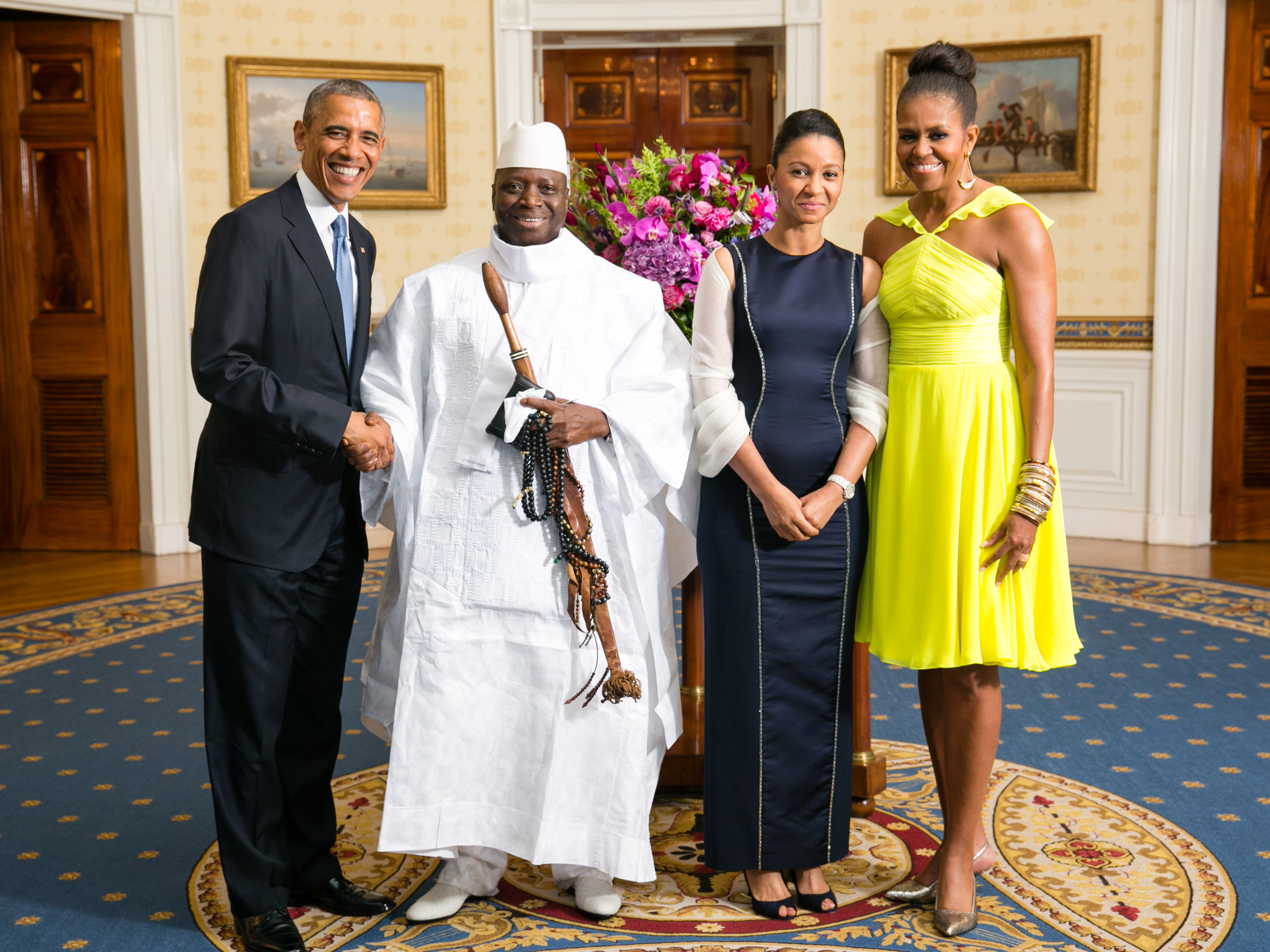
Obama with Nguema, Compaoré and Jammeh.

Country	Leader	In power since
Angola	José Eduardo dos Santos	1979
Burkina Faso	Blaise Compaoré	1987
Cameroon	Paul Biya	1982
Republic of the Congo	Denis Sassou Nguesso	1997
Equatorial Guinea	Teodoro Obiang Nguema Mbasogo	1979
Gambia	Yahya Jammeh	1994
Uganda	Yoweri Museveni	1986

Human Rights Watch and EG Justice called upon the US to denounce Equatoguinean President Teodoro Obiang Nguema Mbasogo's human rights abuses in his country.

The Economic Freedom Fighters, a South African opposition party, objected to the exclusion of Zimbabwean President Robert Mugabe; it also disagreed with Morocco's inclusion as it continues to "illegally" occupy Western Sahara.

== Outcome ==
President Obama delivered a personal, six-minute toast at the U.S.-Africa Summit Dinner in which he invoked his African heritage, saying, “I stand before you as the president of the United States and a proud American. I also stand before you as the son of a man from Africa. The blood of Africa runs through our family. And so for us, the bonds between our countries, our continents, are deeply personal.” He announced $20 billion of investment in energy projects in sub-Saharan Africa.

Through the Office of The Press Secretary, the White House released a number of Fact Sheets pertaining to the outcome of the United States–Africa Leaders Summit. On August 4, 2014, FACTSHEET: Investing in African Trade for Our Common Future was released. It clarified strategies pertaining to the renewal and update of the African Growth Opportunities Act (AGOA), synergies through aligning assistance, improving infrastructure to enhance competitiveness, strengthen trade capacity and creation of new African markets. On August 5, 2014, FACTSHEET: The Doing Business in Africa Campaign (DBIA) was released. The emphasis was on the United States' commitment to strengthen its ties and commercial relationship with Africa. The Fact Sheet clarified this new commitment to expand the Doing Business in Africa Campaign: "At today’s U.S.-Africa Business Forum, President Obama announced $7 billion in new financing to promote U.S. exports to and investments in Africa under the DBIA Campaign. U.S. companies announced new deals in clean energy, aviation, banking, and construction worth more than $14 billion, in addition to $12 billion in new commitments under the President’s Power Africa initiative from private sector partners, the World Bank, and the government of Sweden. Taken together, these new commitments amount to more than $33 billion, supporting economic growth across Africa and tens of thousands of U.S. jobs." In addition, the Fact Sheet emphasized the President's Executive Order to create a Presidential Advisory Council on DBIA and new U.S. Government resources to support U.S. exports and investments in Africa.

Other Materials, Outcomes and Fact Sheets directly related to the U.S.-Africa Leaders Summit were: (1) U.S.-Africa Cooperation in Advancing Gender Equality (2) U.S.-African Cooperation on Global Health (3) Shared Investment in Youth (4) U.S.-African Cooperation on Food Security (5) U.S. Engagement on Climate Change and Resilience in Africa (6) U.S. Support for Democratic Institutions, Good Governance and Human Rights in Africa (7) U.S. Support for Combating Wildlife Trafficking (8) Powering Africa: Increasing Access to Power in Sub-Saharan Africa (9) Investments Announced at Symposium for African Spouses Hosted by First Lady Michelle Obama and Former First Lady Laura Bush. "More than $200 million committed to programs that will empower more than 1 million people in Africa." (10) U.S. Support for Peacekeeping in Africa (11) Security Governance Initiative (12) Partnering to Counter Terrorism in Africa

The White House Press Office released a Statement by the Chair of the U.S.-Africa Leaders Summit. Topics covered were the Summit's Background; Investing in Africa's Future; Advancing Peace and Regional Stability; Governing for the Next Generation; Investing in Women for Peace and Prosperity; and, Providing Skills and Opportunities to the Youth. In closing, it was duly noted that President Obama announced that the U.S.-Africa Leaders Summit would be a recurring event.
