= Ekpe (disambiguation) =

Ekpe is a secret society in Nigeria and Cameroon.

Ekpe may also refer to:

- Ekpè, Benin
- Ekpe (given name), several people
- Ekpe (surname), several people
