= Atlas Mara Limited =

Financial services holding company

- Company type: Public
- Traded as: LSE: ATMA
- Industry: Banking and Finance
- Founded: 28 November 2013; 12 years ago
- Founders: Bob Diamond (banker); Ashish Thakkar
- Headquarters: Tortola, British Virgin Islands
- Key people: John Vitalo (CEO)
- Products: Commercial banking
- Revenue: ▲US$ 420 Million (2017)
- Net income: ▲US$ 47.7 Million (2017)
- Total assets: ▲US$ 3.14 Billion (2017)
- Total equity: ▲US$ 0.79 Billion (2017)
- Number of employees: ~6,500 (2015)
- Website: www.atlasmara.com

Atlas Mara Limited, formerly referred to as Atlas Mara Co-Nvest Limited, is a financial services holding company formed to undertake the acquisition of target banks in Africa.

The Group's headquarters are located in Tortola, British Virgin Islands, with subsidiaries and investments in Botswana, Germany, Mozambique, Nigeria, Rwanda, South Africa, South Sudan, Tanzania, Zambia and Zimbabwe.

== History ==
Atlas Mara was founded on 28 November 2013, by former Barclays Executive Bob Diamond and entrepreneur Ashish Thakkar through Atlas Merchant Capital LLC and Mara Group Holdings Limited as their investment vehicles respectively. Atlas Merchant held 80% while Mara Group held 20% of the venture upon incorporation. The Group's geographical area of focus is on the African continent.

The company was listed on the London Stock Exchange as a SPAC on 17 December 2013, through an IPO which raised US$325 million. As of 22 November 2024, the stock price had crashed and had lost 99.999% of its IPO price (issued at £10.20 per share, last trade was on 31 May 2024 at 0.0001 pence per share) and has effectively ceased trading. The ticker symbol in London is "ATMA.LN". It trades by appointment in the United States on the Pink Sheets under the ticker symbol "AAMAF".

On 31 March 2014, Atlas Mara announced that it had made an offer to acquire sub-Saharan African bank ABC Holdings Limited and Frankfurt based African Development Corporation AG for approximately $265 million. This was to be done through a three phase acquisition strategy:

- The group would acquire 50.1% stake of BancABC through direct agreements.
- The group would make a voluntary offer to acquire a majority stake in the African Development Corporation, bringing total ownership in BancABC up to 88%.
- The group would make a subsequent mandatory offer for the remaining 12% stake in BancABC.

This acquisition would give the group presence in Botswana, Mozambique, Tanzania, Zambia and Zimbabwe and a minority stake in the Union Bank of Nigeria. The Transaction was scheduled to be completed in the fourth quarter of 2014.

On 24 May 2014, Atlas Mara announced that the group would be acquiring Government of Rwanda stake in the commercial arm of the Rwanda Development Bank (BRD).

In September 2014, Atlas Mara acquired a 20.9 per cent stake in the Union Bank of Nigeria from Asset Management Company of Nigeria for $270 million, putting its total holding in the firm at almost 30 percent.

On 22 September 2014, Atlas Mara made a mandatory offer for remaining 4.2% outstanding shareholding in ABC Holdings that the group did not hold in ABCH. The minority shareholders would either opt for a cash consideration or receive 0.0683 ordinary shares of Atlas Mara for each ABCH share held. This will lead to the delisting of ABC Holdings from both the Botswana and Zimbabwe Stock Exchanges that was finally concluded on 28 November 2014.

On 16 October 2014, Atlas Mara announced that it had completed its previously announced acquisition of the Development Bank of Rwanda's commercial banking business which had been spun off into a new subsidiary following an internal reorganization of BRD. This subsidiary was incorporated to run the commercial loan portfolio, BRD's Insurance brokerage firm and a piece of a commercial plot adjacent to BRD's Kigali headquarters. In April 2015, the group announced its intention to acquire a significant minority interest in Banque Populaire du Rwanda SA (BPR). The group would then marge BPR's business to that span off BRD then acquire secondary shares from existing shareholders resulting in the Company having a controlling stake of the merged business.

In 2016, Atlas Mara completed the purchase of Finance Bank of Zambia (FBZ).

In April 2019, Atlas Mara announced that it had entered into a share swap with Equity Group Holdings Limited. The deal would see Atlas Mara transfer 62 per cent of Banque Populaire du Rwanda, 100 per cent of African Banking Corporation of Zambia, African Banking Corporation of Mozambique and African Banking Corporation of Tanzania to Equity Group in exchange for 6.27 per cent shareholding in Equity Group in a transaction valued at valued at US$105.71 million.

== Member companies ==
The companies that comprise the Atlas Mara Group include, but are not limited, to the following:

=== Subsidiaries ===
- African Development Corporation AG – Holding Company – Frankfurt, Germany – 100% Shareholding – A commercial bank holding company.
- ADC Management Services – Holding Company – Port Louis, Mauritius – 100% Shareholding – A commercial bank holding company. Held through African Development Corporation.
- BancABC Zimbabwe – Harare, Zimbabwe – 100% Shareholding – A commercial bank in Zimbabwe, serving individuals and businesses. Held through ABC Holdings Limited.

=== Former investments ===
Investments span off from Atlas Mara include:

- Atlas Mara Bank Zambia – Lusaka, Zambia – 100% Shareholding – A commercial bank in Zambia, serving individuals and businesses. Was held through ABC Holdings Limited. In November 2015, Atlas Mara announced that it would be acquiring Finance Bank of Zambia and merge its operations to those of BancABC Zambia. This would result in the creation of Zambia's largest bank by branch network and fifth largest bank by assets. The Bank was acquired by Nigerian-based Access Bank Group and merged into Access Bank Zambia.
- Banque Populaire du Rwanda – 62% shareholding – A commercial bank in Rwanda, serving individuals and businesses and offering bancassurance services. BRD Commercial Bank's operations were merged to those of BPR creating Rwanda's the second largest bank by total assets. Atlas Mara's stake was acquired by Kenyan-based KCB Group and merged with KCB Bank Rwanda.
- BancABC Botswana – Gaborone, Botswana – 100% Shareholding – A commercial bank in Botswana, serving individuals and businesses. The Bank was acquired by Nigerian-based Access Bank Group and rebranded to Access Bank Botswana.
- BancABC Mozambique – Maputo, Mozambique – 100% Shareholding – A commercial bank in Mozambique, serving individuals and businesses. Acquired by Access Bank Group and merged into Access Bank Mozambique.
- BancABC Tanzania – Dodoma, Tanzania – 74% Shareholding – A commercial bank in Tanzania, serving individuals and businesses. Held through ABC Holdings Limited. Acquired by Access Bank Group in June 2024 and rebranded to Access Bank Tanzania.
- Credit Insurance Zimbabwe Limited – Harare, Zimbabwe – 24% Shareholding – An insurance company underwriting general insurance business in Zimbabwe. Held through BancABC Zimbabwe.
- ICEA Lion Tanzania – Dar es Salaam, Tanzania – 47% Shareholding – An insurance company underwriting general insurance business in Tanzania. ICEA Lion Tanzania is a venture between Kenyan-based ICEA Lion Group and Tanzania Development Finance Company Limited.
- Rswitch Limited – Kigali, Rwanda – 88.54% Shareholding – A payment solution provider in Rwanda. Now a subsidiary of Millicom.
- Tanzania Development Finance Company Limited – Dar es Salaam, Tanzania – 68% Shareholding – A development finance company. Held through ABC Holdings Limited.
- Union Bank of Nigeria – Lagos, Nigeria – 48% Shareholding – A commercial bank in Nigeria. UBN was listed on the Nigeria Stock Exchange. In May 2022, Titan Trust Bank completed the acquisition of UBN.

== Governance ==
The chairman of the board of directors of Atlas Mara Limited, was Arnold O. Ekpe while John Vitalo served as the chief executive officer. The current chairman is Michael Wilkerson.

== See also ==
- List of banks in Africa
