= Tom Scott (businessman) =

American entrepreneur

- Born: Thomas W. Scott; February 2, 1966 (age 60); Chevy Chase, Maryland, U.S.
- Education: Brown University
- Title: CEO and Chairman, The Nantucket Project

Thomas W. Scott (born February 2, 1966) is an American entrepreneur best known as the CEO and co-founder of Nantucket Nectars, a beverage company Scott founded with Tom First in 1989. The company reached national prominence, appearing on the “Inc. 500” list of fastest-growing U.S. companies for five years in a row. In 2002, Scott and his partner sold Nantucket Nectars to Cadbury Schweppes.

Scott is CEO of The Nantucket Project, an annual conference that takes place on the Massachusetts island of Nantucket.

== Education ==
Tom Scott attended the Landon School, a boys' preparatory school in Bethesda, Maryland, graduating in 1985. Scott graduated from Brown University in 1989.

== Career ==
=== Nantucket Nectars ===
Tom Scott and Tom First met at Brown University and moved to Nantucket after graduating together in 1989. They started a business called Allserve, a floating convenience store for yachts in Nantucket Harbor. Scott had previously traded his car in for a 22-foot boat, which he began taking out on the water in 1988. They offered services such as bringing groceries to boats and assisting with chores such as delivering laundry. After their initial success, they expanded their fleet to three boats. First and Scott began to produce juice beverages, which they pasteurized and bottled themselves. They grew this enterprise into a national brand that competed with companies like Snapple, Coke, Pepsi and Arizona Ice Tea. Scott and First sold Nantucket Nectars to Cadbury Schweppes PLC in 2002 for an undisclosed amount. The story of how Scott and First grew their brand is the subject of a popular Harvard Business School case study, which was published in 1998 by Jon Biotti, Joseph Lassiter, and William A. Sahlman.

=== Film and television credits ===
Scott is a film and television creator/producer. His accomplishments in the field include the rare honor of selection to both the Cannes and Sundance Film Festivals in 2010 for his film "Daddy Longlegs". His television series Neistat Brothers, aired on HBO. Most recently, Scott produced the documentary film “Apple Pushers” with Edward Norton. Prior to that, he founded Plum TV, which became a national network of eight stations receiving more than 14 Emmy Awards® in total.

=== The Nantucket Project ===
Scott's vision for The Nantucket Project (TNP) is to energize the public dialogue by creating a venue in which individuals can engage innovative thinking from a fresh perspective. Speakers have included Rahm Emanuel, Eric Schmidt, Larry Summers, Meredith Whitney, Senator John McCain, David Rubenstein, Steve Case, Mellody Hobson, Peter Thiel, Craig Venter, former Senate Majority Leader Bill Frist, U.S. Secretary of State John Kerry, Former Barclays CEO Bob Diamond, Tony Award winner Julie Taymor and many others.
