= Mara Z =

Android smartphone released in 2019

The Mara Z (stylized as Mara Z) is an Android smartphone in the Maraphone series, manufactured in Rwanda. It was officially announced and released on 7 October 2019 in both Kigali, Rwanda, and Durban, South Africa, alongside the Mara X. At launch, it retailed for approximately 175,000 Rwandan francs (US$190 at the time).

== Specifications ==
=== Hardware ===
The Mara Z is powered by a Qualcomm Snapdragon 435 processor, with 3 GB of RAM and 32 GB of internal storage. It features a 5.7-inch (14.48 cm) Full HD+ (1080×2160) display with Corning Gorilla Glass protection. The device includes a 13 MP rear camera, 13 MP front camera with flash, fingerprint sensor, and a 3075 mAh battery. It supports 2G, 3G, and 4G LTE networks.

=== Software ===
Both the Mara Z and the Mara X run Android One editions of Android 8.1 Oreo.
