= Lemo =

Lemo may refer to:

== People ==
- Tunde Lemo, Nigerian banker
- Zita Lemo, Austrian table tennis player

== Places ==
- Lemo or Limo (woreda), Ethiopia
- Lemo or Lemu, Finland
- Morón Air Base, Spain (by ICAO code)

== Other ==
- Battle of Lemo
- LeMO, virtual museum
- LEMO, Swiss manufacturer
