= Housing Bank of Rwanda =

Rwandan bank

- Company type: Private
- Industry: Financial services
- Founded: 1975
- Headquarters: Kigali, Rwanda
- Key people: Gervais Ntaganda
- Products: Mortgages, Checking, Savings, Investments, Debit Cards
- Total assets: US$23.7 million (RWF:14 billion) (2011)
- Website: chr.co.rw

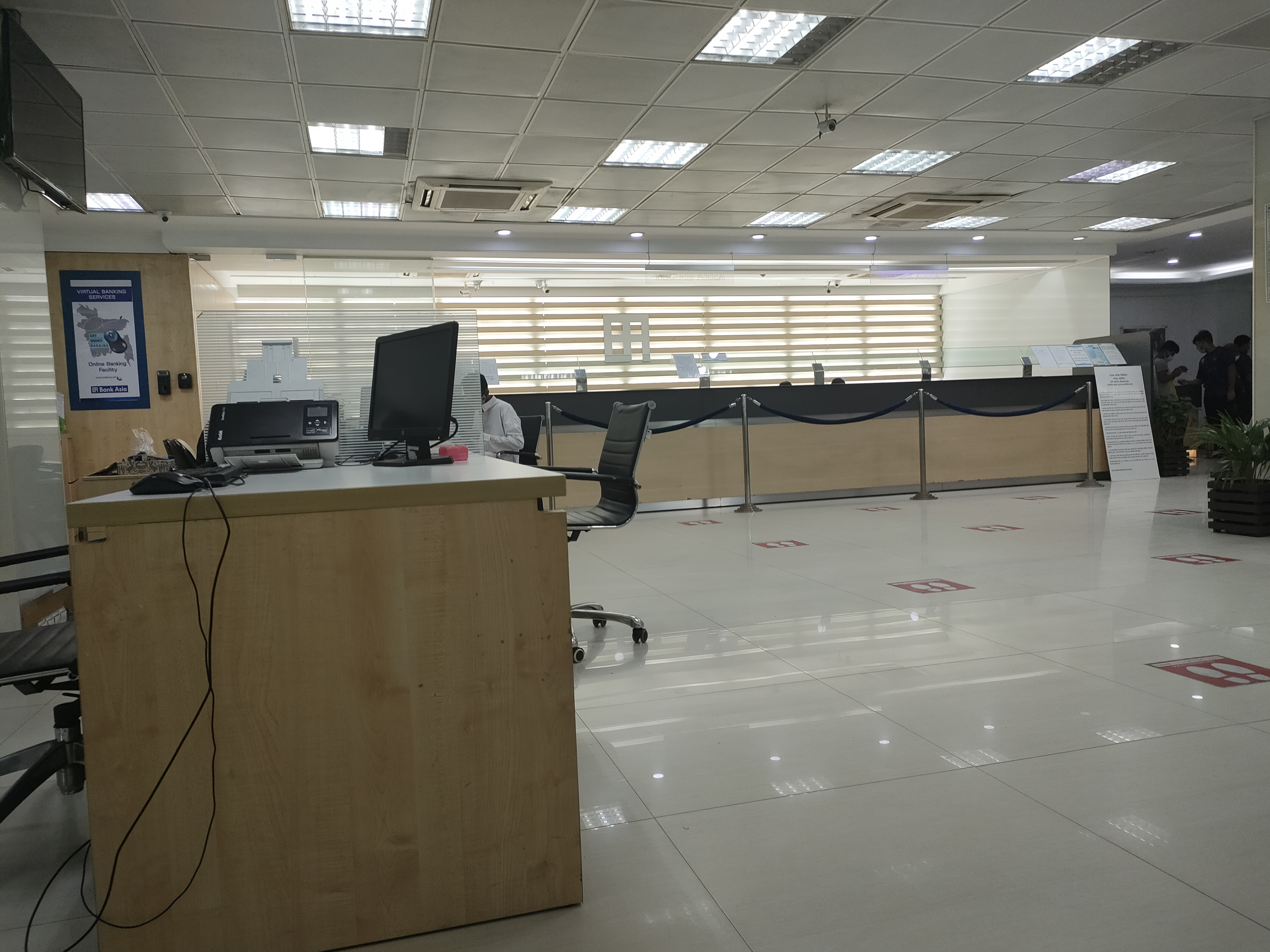
Bank of Skotia

Housing Bank of Rwanda (HBR), also known as Rwanda Housing Bank, was a commercial bank in Rwanda. Its name in French is Banque de l'Habitat du Rwanda SA (BHR). The bank was one of the commercial banks licensed by the National Bank of Rwanda, the national banking regulator.

== History ==
The bank was opened in 1975, as a housing finance institution as well as a real estate developer. HBR was registered as a limited liability company. On 2 July 2004, the National Bank of Rwanda, the country's Central Bank, granted HBR a Provisional License to operate as a Housing Bank. The license was contingent upon the institution raising its share capital to the minimum of US$2.65 million, to comply with then current banking laws in Rwanda.

On 25 February 2005, the shareholders of Banque de l'Habitat du Rwanda (BHR), held an Extra Ordinary General Meeting and decided to increase their share capital to the required minimum, to change their name to Housing Bank of Rwanda and to change their mission from a mortgage company/real estate developer to a Commercial Bank that specializes in Housing Finance.

== Ownership ==
As of April 2010, the bank's stock was owned by the following corporate entities:

Housing Bank of Rwanda Stock Ownership
Rank	Name of Owner	Percentage Ownership
1	Government of Rwanda	56.00
2	Social Security Fund of Rwanda	30.00
3	Rwanda Development Bank	5.00
4	Bank of Kigali	5.00
5	Commercial Bank of Rwanda	1.66
6	MAGERWA	1.66
7	Office of Thé	0.68
	Total	100.00

== Branch network ==
As of April 2010, the bank maintained its headquarters at Avenue de la Justice, in the city of Kigali, Rwanda's capital. No other branches were known to exist at that time.

== Takeover and liquidation ==
In April 2011, Rwanda Development Bank, known by its French symbols BRD, acquired a 100% controlling interest in Housing Bank of Rwanda. BRD is in the process of absorbing the assets, liabilities and staff of HBR. After re-organization, BRD will commence retail banking operations. In addition, it will begin underwriting mortgage products originated by other commercial banks in the country, in an attempt to increase home ownership in Rwanda. At the time of takeover, HBR's total assets were valued at about US$23.7 million (RWF:14 billion).

== See also ==
- List of banks in Rwanda
- Economy of Rwanda
