= Titan Trust Bank =

Nigerian commercial bank

- Type: Private
- Industry: Banking
- Founded: 2018; 8 years ago
- Headquarters: Lagos, Nigeria
- Key people: Tunde Lemo (Chairman), Emmanuel David Chukwudi (CEO)
- Website: titantrustbank.com

Titan Trust Bank Limited is a Nigerian commercial bank that is licensed by the Central Bank of Nigeria, the national banking regulator. The bank provide financial services to micro, small and medium scale enterprises. Adaeze Udensi is the CEO of Titan Trust Bank and Tunde Lemo is the Chairman.

== History ==
Titan Trust Bank was established on 12 December 2018 and received its national banking license in April 2019, to operate as a commercial bank. In June 2021, Titan Trust Bank got approval to collect fees on behalf of the federal government under the Nigeria Export Supervision Scheme (NESS). The bank has branches in Lagos and Kano State.

In May 2022, Titan Trust Bank completed the acquisition of the shares of Union Bank of Nigeria's major shareholders, including Union Global Partners Limited, Atlas Mara Limited, Standard Chartered Bank, Montane Partners West Africa Limited and Mr. Emeka Emuwa, to complete transfer of 93.41% of Union Bank's issued share capital to Titan Trust. In June 2022, Titan Trust Bank got $300 million financing to complete the buyout of a controlling stake in Union Bank. In May 2023, Titan Trust Bank Limited acquired the shares of all minority shareholders in Union Bank with 12.18 billion naira.

== Awards ==
Best Trade Finance Provider in Nigeria in 2020 by Trade Finance Providers Awards.

Deal of the Year Award in 2022 by the BusinessDay Banks and Financial Institutions(BAFI)
