= Ekpe (surname) =

Ekpe is a surname. Notable people with the surname include:

- Arnold Ekpe (born 1953), Nigerian banker and businessman
- Asuquo Ekpe (died 2016), Nigerian footballer
- Simeon Ekpe (1934–2010), Nigerian judge
- Thompson Ekpe (born 1996), Nigerian footballer
