= Nantucket Nectars =

American beverage company

Nantucket Nectars is an American beverage company created by Tom First and Tom Scott, which began as a small business selling a variety of items to yachts in Nantucket, Massachusetts. Eventually they began selling juice blends that were originally inspired by a peach nectar Tom First had while on a visit to Spain. Today the brand is owned by Keurig Dr Pepper and offers drinks in several different flavors.

Originally the beverage was sold in 16 fluid-ounce glass bottles with caps that featured information about Nantucket Harbor and the history of Nantucket Nectars. Now the drinks come in 15.9 fl oz (470 mL) bottles made with 100% recycled plastic (excluding the cap and label).

The success of "Tom and Tom," as the business duo became known, has become a piece of modern business lore. The company was featured on the Inc. 500's list of 500 fastest growing U.S. companies for five years in a row. The story of how they grew their brand is the subject of a popular Harvard Business School case study, which was published in 1998 by Jon Biotti, Joseph Lassiter, and William A. Sahlman.

== History ==
Tom First and Tom Scott met at Brown University in 1985. After graduation, they headed to Nantucket where they started Allserve, a floating convenience store servicing boats in Nantucket Harbor, delivering everything from newspapers to laundry. In 1989, First attempted to recreate for a Nantucket cooking competition a peach drink that he drank on a regular basis while on a trip to Spain. After successfully re-creating the taste, the two began mixing the juice in a blender, pasteurizing it, and bottling it themselves for sale on their boat. Their juice was originally sold for $1 from recycled wine bottles. It was not until later that they decided to call it Nantucket Nectars.

One of their first big investors was Michael Egan, who was involved in turning around the Alamo Rent a Car business. They reported $1 million in sales in 1993, $6 million in 1994, and $15 million in 1995. In 1994, they decided to focus solely on creating and selling their juices. The business then moved to Cambridge, Massachusetts.

Ocean Spray purchased an 80% stake in Nantucket Nectars in 1997 and then sold to London-based Cadbury Schweppes PLC in 2002. The brand was owned by Plano, Texas–based Dr Pepper Snapple Group and is now owned by Burlington MA based Keurig Dr Pepper. The founders are no longer involved in the day-to-day operations, but still perform marketing duties and voice the radio ads.

In advertisement campaigns including on radio and television, Tom and Tom often refer to themselves as "The Juice Guys".

== Flavors ==
Nantucket Nectars come in a variety of different flavors. These include:

- Lemon Tea
- Half and Half
- Orange Mango
- Pavis' St. Joe River Punch
- Pineapple Orange Guava
- Pomegranate Cherry
- Pomegranate Pear
- Red Plum
- Carrot Orange Mango
- Squeezed Lemonade
- Garza's Grapeade
- Kiwi Berry
- Guava
- Peach Orange
- Pineapple Orange Banana
- Pressed Apple
- Premium Orange
- Watermelon Strawberry
- Big Cranberry
- Mango Lemonade

== See also ==
- The Nantucket Project
