= Arnold Ekpe =

Nigerian banker and businessman

Arnold Onyekwere Ekpe (born August 1953) is a Nigerian banker and businessman who was the group chief executive of Ecobank, the pan-African bank with operations from Togo to Nigeria to the DRC from 2005 to 2012. As of June 11, 2025, He is the Chairman designate of Dangote Sugar refinery.

== Early life ==
Ekpe was born in Nigeria, and also lived in Cameroon.

He graduated from King's College, Lagos in 1972, earned a bachelor's degree in mechanical engineering at the University of Manchester, and followed up with an MBA from the Manchester Business School.

== Career ==
Ekpe served as the group CEO of Ecobank from 1996 to 2001, and 2005 to 2012. Under his auspices, he oversaw the expansion of the bank across Africa and steered the company through the Great Recession.

Prior to joining Ecobank, he was the vice-president of the West/Southern African corporate finance desk at Citibank. From 2002 to 2003 he was group CEO of United Bank for Africa (UBA), and from 2003 to 2005 he was a partner with African Capital Alliance, a private equity firm.

He was the honorary president of the Business Council for Africa, chairman of Safire Luxembourg, and chairman at Atlas Mara, the investment management firm founded by former Barclays CEO, Bob Diamond, between December 2013 and December 2016.

He is now senior adviser to Dangote Group and Equator Capital Partners (US). He is chairman of Micro Cred France, non-executive director of Crown Agents Bank (UK), Crown Agents Investment Management Ltd (UK), AVMS India, and Dangote Flour Mills Ltd. He is a trustee of Vision for a Nation, a global charity, and supports research at University of Manchester, his alma mater.
