= The Nantucket Project =

Annual gathering that takes place on Nantucket, Massachusetts

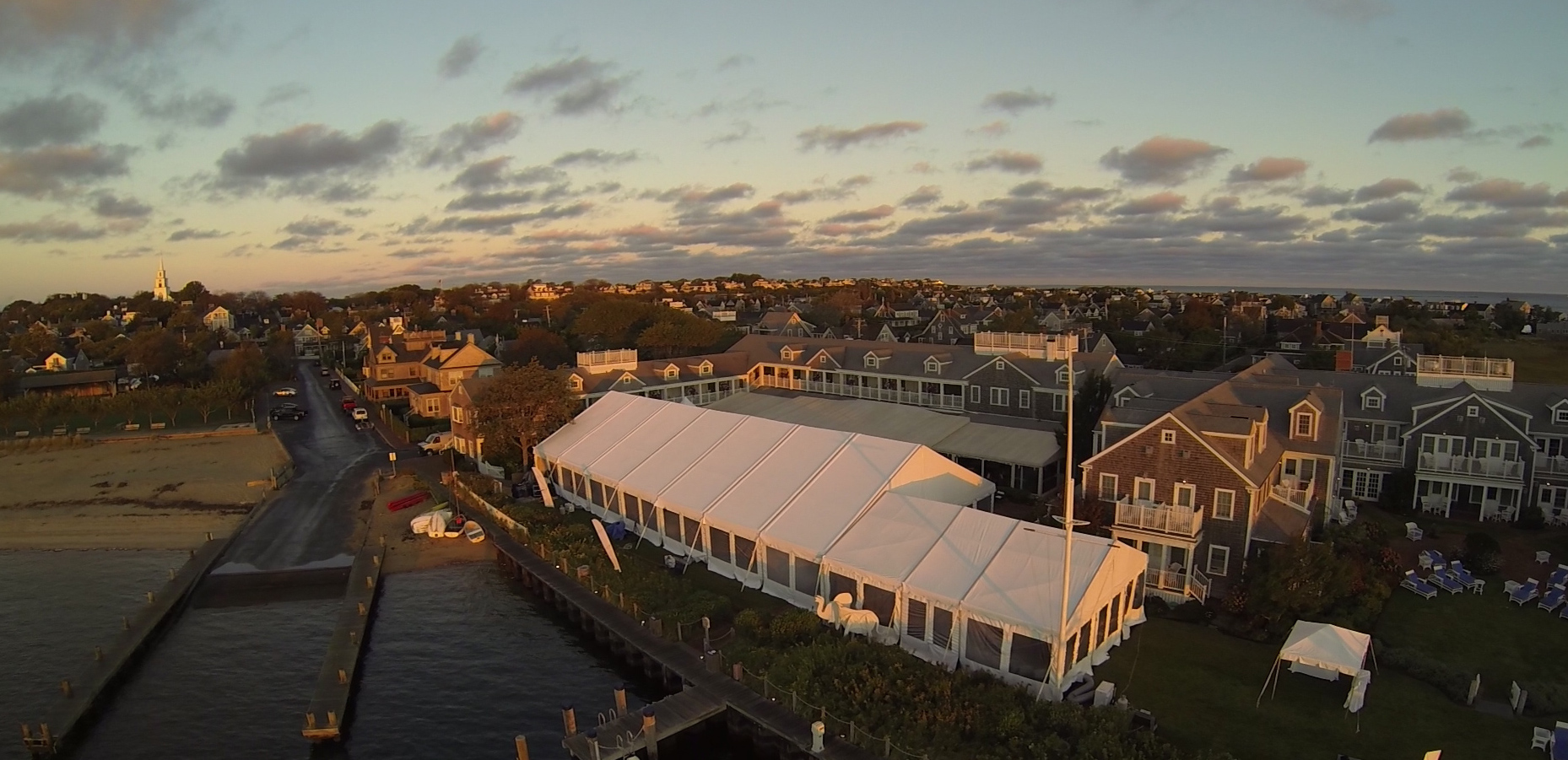
- Website type: Conference
- Available in: English
- Headquarters: Nantucket, {{{location_country}}}
- Area served: Worldwide
- Creators: Tom Scott, Kate Brosnan
- Key people: Wendy Schmidt, Bob Diamond
- Website: www.nantucketproject.com
- Launched: 2010
- Current status: Active

The Nantucket Project is an annual gathering that takes place on Nantucket, Massachusetts, housed mainly at the White Elephant Hotel. The event is held in a tent overlooking Nantucket Harbor.

The Nantucket Project was co-founded in 2010 by Tom Scott and Kate Brosnan. The Nantucket Project's founding circle includes Scott, founder and CEO of Nantucket Nectars and creator the HBO television series The Neistat Brothers, Wendy Schmidt, President of The Schmidt Family Foundation, former senator Bill Frist, Alicia Mullen and Jennifer and Bob Diamond, the former group chief executive of Barclays.

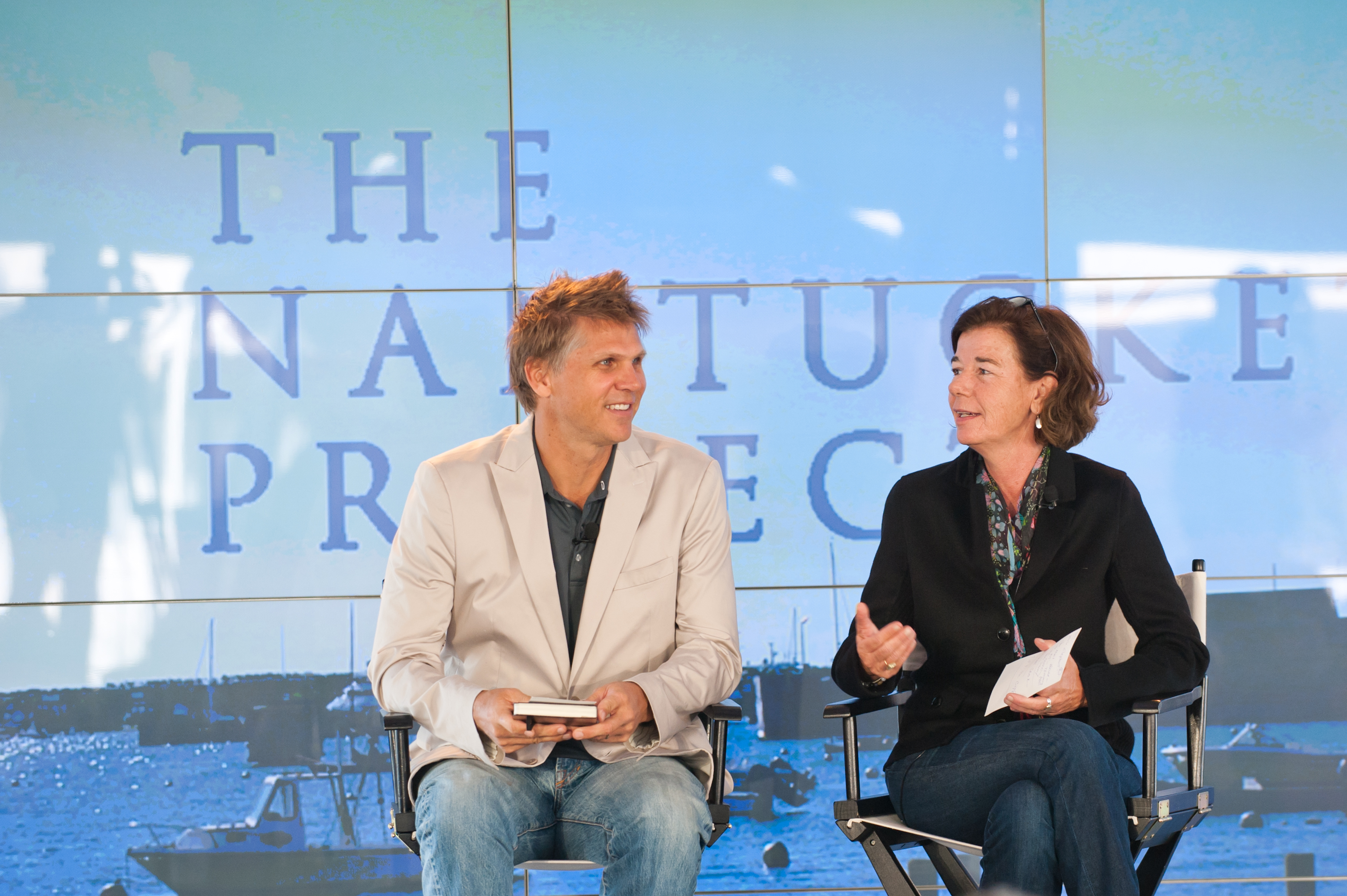
Co-founders Tom Scott and Kate Brosnan at the 2013 Nantucket Project

The inaugural event was held in the fall of 2011 at the White Elephant hotel. The Nantucket Project has remained at that venue. Notable past speakers have included Jennifer Garner, Neil Young, Tig Notaro, Tony Blair, Marcia Clark, Paul Kagame, Steve Wozniak, Ndaba Mandela, Meredith Whitney, George W. Bush, Hope Solo, David Rubenstein, Valerie Plame, Mellody Hobson, Moby, Laura Dern, John Kerry, Kelly Corrigan, Liz Murray, Peter Diamandis, Andre Leon Talley, Gregg Renfrew, Dean Kamen, Julie Taymor, Paul Giamatti, and Krista Tippett.

Speakers participate in a variety of formats, which include individual presentations, panels and intimate one-on-one conversations. All speakers are directed to address the theme of each year's event. The theme of the 2011 event was "Re-Think." The theme of the 2012 event was "Collective Intelligence," or "how we can leverage technology and other advances to aggregate and amplify human intelligence." The theme for 2013 was "Seek the Truth, Endure the Consequences." The theme for 2014 was Art + Commerce, "a convergence" that conference organizers say "best defines our world today." The theme for TNP8 was neighborhood.

== TNP Labs ==
In 2014, the Project launched TNP Labs, a production and innovation laboratory. The first film released by TNP Labs, "Reclaim Democracy," explores how Lawrence Lessig's MayDay political action committee aims to revolutionize campaign finance. The film was viewed over 4 million times on Upworthy and other social media sites.

Another TNP Labs production, "Shirt," is a visualization of a Robert Pinsky poem that is read by several performers such as Herbie Hancock, Kate Burton, Nas and Pinsky himself. "Shirt" was released on The New Yorker's website in December, 2014.

In addition to its own in-house productions, TNP Labs brings "cutting-edge filmmakers to the island to create short films inspired by presentations at the event."

== Julian Assange hologram appearance ==
At the 2014 Nantucket Project, WikiLeaks editor-in-chief Julian Assange appeared in the form of a hologram. While Assange was physically located at the Ecuadorean Embassy in London, where he had been given asylum, a virtual representation of Assange appeared onstage with American film director Eugene Jarecki.

Jarecki wrote in The Guardian before the event, "it crosses my mind I may be abetting a crime or violating international extradition laws. But I reassure myself that, in this regard, the worldwide web remains a kind of wild wild west, and the virtual escape of a person is not (yet?) a crime."
