= Rwanda Development Bank =

Bank of Rwanda

Development Bank of Rwanda
- Company type: Parastatal
- Industry: Finance
- Founded: 1967
- Headquarters: Kigali, Rwanda
- Key people: Bobby Pittman; Chairman; Kampeta Sayinzoga; Chief Executive Officer
- Products: Long Term Finance, Financial Advisory Services, Management Services, Export/Import Finance, Capacity Building, Trade Finance, Leasing Mortgage Finance
- Total assets: US$122 million (RWF:72 billion) (2011)
- Owner: Public Company Limited by Shares
- Website: www.brd.rw

Development Bank of Rwanda, commonly referred to by its French name Banque Rwandaise de Développement (BRD), is a development bank in Rwanda. It is one of the banks licensed by the National Bank of Rwanda, the national banking regulator.

== Overview ==
The bank began its operations in 1967, as a long-term financial services provider, with the financing geared towards national development projects. As of April 2011, the total asset valuation of the bank was approximately US$122 million (RWF:72 billion), with shareholders equity of approximately US$42.3 million (RWF:25 billion)

== Areas of Intervention ==
The areas of Interventio n include the following:

- Agriculture;
- Exports & Manufacturing;
- Student Loans;
- Energy;
- Housing & Infrastructure;
- Digital Economy;
- Social Infrastructure

== Special Projects ==
The Development Bank of Rwanda offers great products to its customers. These are:

Special Projects

- Access to Finance Grant Facility
- Jya Mbere
- Cana Uhendukiwe
- Clean Cooking
- Gira Iwawe
- Export Growth Fund
- Hatana

Lending Products

- Investment Loans;
- Trade Finance;
- Lines of Credit;

Complementary Products

- Guarantee Funds;
- Capacity Building;
- Advisory Services

== History ==
Development Bank of Rwanda (BRD), is a Public Company Limited by Shares, with a share capital of RWF 57,808,931,000, registered at the Officer of the Registrar General, whose company code n° 100003547.

The Bank was incorporated on August 5, 1967; however, its incorporation certificate was issued on 7/7/2011 while a banking license n°003 was issued by the National Bank of Rwanda on August 11, 2009.

For more than four decades, BRD has been the sole provider of long term finance and has significantly facilitated the emergence of different productive enterprises in the private sector.

2000-2009: Growth and Innovation phase

This phase ensues from the necessity for the Bank to contribute to the recapitalization and the monetization of the rural area, in the increase of the export against of challenges of the Rwandan Economy imposed by the needs of fast and long-lasting growth to fight poverty. In fact more than 90% of the population lives in the rural area and mainly on agriculture.

In order to enhance the Bank mission of development, in 2005 the Government of Rwanda mandated BRD with a mission to become the “Financier” of Rwanda’s development. Since then BRD has been transforming itself in order to be able to play its crucial role in Rwanda’s development. BRD 2005-2009 Strategic Operating Plan translates BRD mission and vision to become the most profitable bank at the service of poverty reduction.

Post-Genocide phase: After the 1994 genocide against the Tutsi, there were catastrophic results that followed and the bank continues to shoulder a burden of more than 50% of its portfolio constituting non- performing loans consequential from the 1994 genocide.

An amount of loans totaling Rwf6.8 billion, 115 operations; Rwf6.7 billion in 112 lines of credit; Rwf156.4 million in equity shares in 3 productive ventures. The loans were mainly invested in modernization and rehabilitation of ventures to the tune of Rwf13.4 billions, creating an employment of 8,923 people and an added value to the economy of about Rwf8 billion.

The war paralyzed the rural areas and revitalization of the activities after 1994 concentrated in the capital city mainly in the secondary and tertiary sectors. This period was a reorganization and consolidation phase.

1988-1994: Maturity phase

During this period, the Bank disbursed loans totaling: Rwf4. 6 billion in 873 lines of credit; Rwf84.5 million in equity shares in 7 productive ventures. It generated an investment volume of Rwf15.7 billion with a creation of employment for 9,094 people and value added to the economy of Rwf8, 5 billion.

The priority areas for the loans were agro-industries mainly the sectors of tea and manufacturing, enabled by low cost financial resources available to small and medium scale enterprises in agribusiness; artisans and micro- projects

1968-1987: Establishment and development phase

During the years 1968 to 1970, the Bank was being established and no projects were financed.

In the four years that followed, the Bank recorded major loans on vehicles (pick-ups) and grinding mills. The financing of the vehicles extended all over the country and marked a crucial step towards improving accessibility of goods in the country.

Effective from 1974, the bank embarked on aggressive financing of different sectors of the economy.

An amount of loans totaling Rwf6.6 billion has since been extended to 501 operations, Rwf317 million invested in equity shares with 23 companies, and Rwf6.3 billion in loans to 478 borrowers. This meant an investment impact of about Rwf12.6 billion with a creation of employment opportunities for 8,400 people and cumulative added value of Rwf25.2 billion.

The bank has financed about 80% of the country’s medium and long term loan portfolio in the productive ventures.

== Acquisition ==
MARCH - 2011: Merger of BAS and BDF

Since March 2011, BRD Advisory Services (BAS Ltd) and BRD Development Fund (BDF Ltd) companies were merged to form a new company called BDF Ltd. The two former companies were BRD wholly owned subsidiaries tasked with the mission of providing services and products that boost the development of SME’s in Rwanda. The new company remained subsidiary to BRD and streamlined the previous mission.

The merger was decided by the BRD Board of Directors meeting held on 17 March 2011 with the aim of improving the efficiency of operations, the quality, the range of services and products to be provided by the new company, BDF Ltd.

26-APRIL-2011: Acquisition of BHR

On the 26th April 2011, BRD officially acquired Banque de l’Habitat du Rwanda (BHR) in a ceremony hosted by Honorable Minister of Finance and Economic Planning, Mr. John RWANGOMBWA. The objective of this acquisition was to achieve sustainable growth by making BRD a stronger and better positioned bank which provided long-term loans, housing loans, mortgage re-financing and other financial services aimed at improving access to finance in Rwanda.

The takeover of BHR gave BRD an asset base of over Rwf 72 Billion (Rwf58 Billion of BRD and Rwf 14 Billion from BHR).

== Subsidiaries ==
The bank has two subsidiaries, owned 100%, namely:

- BRD Development Fund - A development fund
- Housing Bank of Rwanda - Development Bank of Rwanda took full control in April 2011

== Ownership ==
The bank's stock is owned by the following sovereign and corporate entities:

Development Bank of Rwanda Stock Ownership'
Rank	Name of Owner	Percentage Ownership
1	Government of Rwanda	
2	Rwanda Public Enterprises	
3	Private Institutions in Rwanda	
4	Agence française de développement (AFD)	
5	German Investment Corporation (DEG)	
6	Netherlands Development Finance Company (FMO)	
7	Administration Générale de la Coopération au Développement of Belgium (AGCD)	
8	Bank of Tokyo	
	Total	100.00

== Branches ==
The bank maintains one location at their headquarters:

- Headquarters - Kigali

== Governance ==
As of February 2023, the following constitute the Board of Directors of the bank:

- Bobby Pittman - Chairman of the Board
- Callixte Nyikindekwe - Director
- Alice Rwema - Director
- Stella Nteziryayo - Director
- Angelique Karekezi - Director
- Joseph M. Mudenge - Director
- Ghislain Nkeramugaba - Director

The following are members of the Executive Committee Team at the Development Bank of Rwanda, as of November 2019.

- Kampeta Sayinzoga - Chief Executive Officer
- Vincent Ngirikiringo - Chief Finance Officer
- Gloria Tengera Company Secretary and General Counsel
- Blaise Pascal Gasabira - Head Strategy Research M&E and Resource Mobilization
- Ngabe Rutagarama - Head of IT and Digital Innovation
- Nadine Teta Mbabazi - Head of Human Capital and Corporate Services
- Jean Claude Iliboneye - Head of Business Development
- Liliane Igihozo Uwera - Head of SPIU
- Martin Ndagijimana - Head Internal Auditor
- Wilson Rurangwa - Head of Education Portfolio Management

== See also ==
- Economy of Rwanda
- List of banks in Rwanda
- Kigali
- Atlas Mara Co-Nvest Limited
- List of national development banks
