= Casey Neistat =

American YouTube personality, filmmaker, vlogger and entrepreneur

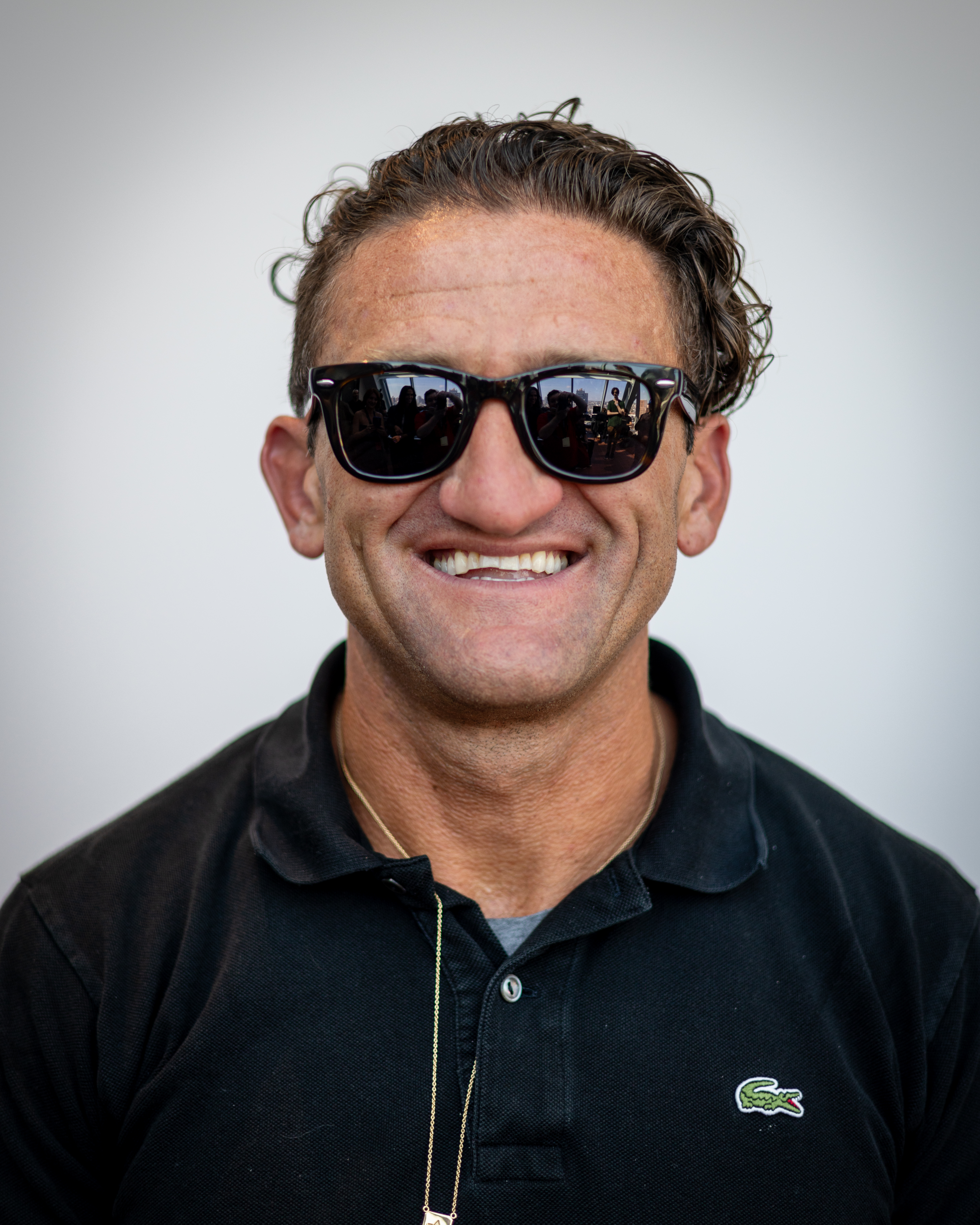
- Neistat in September 2025
- Born: Casey Owen Neistat; March 25, 1981 (age 45); Gales Ferry, Connecticut, U.S.
- Occupations: YouTube personality; filmmaker; vlogger; entrepreneur
- Years active: 2010–present
- Spouses: Candice Pool (m. 2005; ann. 2005) (m. 2013)
- Partner: Robin Harris (1998–2001)
- Children: 3
- Relatives: Louis Nye (great-uncle); Van Neistat (brother)

YouTube information
- Channel: CaseyNeistat
- Subscribers: 12.7 million
- Views: 3.27 billion
- Last updated: July 17, 2026
- Website: caseyneistat.com

Casey Owen Neistat (/ˈnaɪstæt/; born March 25, 1981) is an American YouTube personality, filmmaker, vlogger and co-founder of the multimedia company Beme, which was later acquired by CNN. In 2018, he founded 368, a creative space for creators to collaborate with each other.

== Early life and education ==
Neistat was born in Gales Ferry, Connecticut, to Barry Edward Neistat (b. 1953), then a commercial kitchen appliance salesman, and Amy Louise (née Bickford; b. 1956). They later operated the Muddy Waters Cafe in New London, Connecticut. His paternal grandmother Louise Neistat (née Grossman; 1919–2011) was a professional tap dancer and instructor who primarily worked at Radio City Music Hall in New York City.

He was brought up in Reform Judaism. He dropped out of high school during his sophomore year at the age of 17. He eventually left his family and had a son named Owen, at age 17, with his then-girlfriend Robin Harris, in 1998. Between the age of 17 and 20 (from 1998 to 2001), he lived in a trailer park with Harris and Owen. It was during this time that Neistat decided to move to New York City.

Before moving to New York City, Neistat worked as a dishwasher at a seafood restaurant and was a short-order cook in Mystic, Connecticut.

== Early filmmaking career ==
=== Work with Tom Sachs ===
In 2001, Neistat and his brother Van began working with artist Tom Sachs, ultimately making a series of films about the artist's sculptures and installations.

=== iPod's Dirty Secret ===
Neistat first gained international exposure in 2003 for a three-minute film titled iPod's Dirty Secret, criticizing Apple for not having a battery replacement program for their iPod line of portable media players. The film received national media attention and brought broad attention to the company's policy towards iPod battery replacements. The film was posted to the Internet on September 20, 2003, and quickly attracted media attention. The film was praised as "wonderfully renegade" by The Washington Post.

Apple announced a battery replacement policy on November 14, 2003, and also announced an extended iPod warranty program on November 21. Fox News set the date of the policy change at "two weeks" after the posting of the clip and Neil Cavuto called it a "David and Goliath story" on Fox News's Your World. Apple spokeswoman Natalie Sequeira denied any connection between the film and the new policy, stating the policy revision had been in the works for months before the film was released.

=== Science Experiments ===
In 2004, Neistat and his brother produced a film series titled Science Experiments. The 15-minute series featured a number of short films documenting various experiments. The series was included in the 26th São Paulo Biennial in São Paulo, Brazil. The work was popular, and was eventually featured in Creative Time's 59th Minute program showing a one-minute excerpt from Neistat's film every 59 minutes on the Panasonic Times Square Astrovision.

=== The Neistat Brothers ===
In July 2008, HBO purchased an eight-episode television series, The Neistat Brothers, for just under $2 million. The series was produced by Casey and Van Neistat, and Tom Scott. Independent film producer Christine Vachon served as consulting producer. Written and directed by Casey and Van, the show is autobiographical and told in the first person. Each of the eight episodes is made up of short stories about the brothers' lives. The show premiered June 4, 2010, on HBO.

The Hollywood Reporter likened the brothers' charm, wit and simplicity to that of Dr. Seuss. Hank Stuever of the Washington Post praised the brothers' joie de vivre.

== Career ==
=== YouTube ===
On February 17, 2010, Neistat uploaded a video about when to use the emergency brake cord on train cars in the New York City Subway. Neistat criticized the way that the MTA did not make it clear when the emergency brake cord should be pulled. According to the video, one should only use the emergency brake system when the motion of the train poses an imminent threat to life or limb.

On February 23, 2010, Neistat released a six-minute film on Vimeo about the Internet site Chatroulette. It explained what the Chatroulette site is, how it works and why people use it. Various experiments are conducted in the video, with the findings presented in stop-frame animations. One experiment found that people on Chatroulette are much more likely to talk to a woman. While 95% "nexted" Neistat, his female friend Genevieve was clicked away by only 5%.

On June 7, 2011, Neistat criticized the New York City Police Department's ticketing of cyclists in New York City for riding outside of the marked bike lanes. In a video titled Bike Lanes, Neistat encounters an officer and receives a $50 ticket for not riding within the lanes. Neistat then proceeds to comically ride his bike in the lane crashing into various obstructions, supporting the argument that lanes aren't the safest at all times and are even sometimes unusable. In response, New York Magazine called Neistat a "Bike-Lane Vigilante" and the film was covered by most mainstream media outlets. Additionally, Time named Bike Lanes number eight on their Top 10 Creative Videos of 2011 list. In 2022, Neistat uploaded a YouTube video titled NYC BIKE LANE BOUNTY, discussing a proposal in which New York City residents can report cars illegally parked in bike lanes for a percentage of the violator's prospective fine. In the opening of this video, Neistat pays homage to Bike Lanes by abruptly crashing his bike into an illegally parked van while stating statistics about bicycle accidents in NYC.

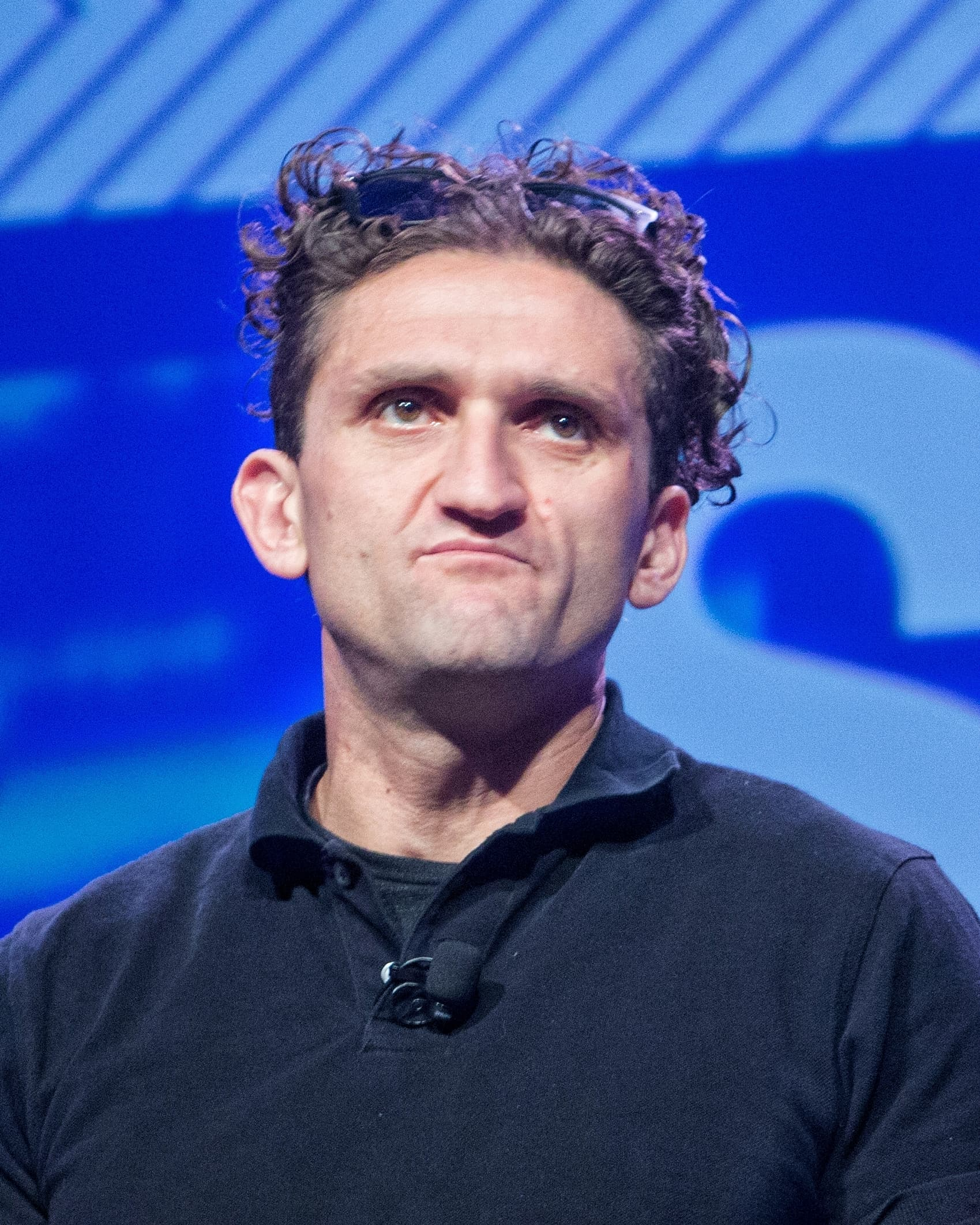
Neistat at South by Southwest in 2017

In 2014, Neistat was listed on New Media Rockstars Top 100 Channels, ranked at #82.

==== Daily vlogs ====
Neistat started to post daily vlogs on YouTube on March 26, 2015. Neistat stated that he sees his vlogs more as a forum as opposed to a daily journal. On January 19, 2016, Neistat posted his 300th vlog, although between November 2016 and March 2017 Neistat stopped making vlogs to focus more on short films.

Particularly popular videos have included snowboarding on New York City streets during the January 2016 United States blizzard. The video had 6.5 million views on YouTube within 24 hours.

On September 6, 2016, Neistat won GQ's "New Media Star" Man of the Year Award.

In October 2017, Neistat met with Indonesian president Joko Widodo.

By July 2018, Neistat had released 936 vlogs and other films since the channel started on February 15, 2010. In August 2015, Neistat reached one million subscribers, and reached four million by August 2016. By February 2023, his channel has 12.5 million subscribers.

In March 2022, his film titled Under the Influence, a documentary following David Dobrik and examining various controversies around him, premiered at SXSW.

==== Advertising ====
In addition to his career in television and film, Neistat has also directed and starred in television commercials, having worked with clients such as Samsung, Nike Google, Finn Jewelry, J.Crew, and Mercedes-Benz.

===== Make It Count =====
Make It Count is a video written, directed and starring Neistat for Nike. The video begins with scrolling text that reads: "Nike asked me to make a movie about what it means to #makeitcount. Instead of making their movie, I spent the entire budget traveling around the world with my friend Max. We'd keep going until the money ran out. It took 10 days."

The video then begins in earnest with Neistat and his collaborator Max Joseph traveling to the airport. Fast editing of their travels with interludes of inspirational quotes make up the film, ultimately ending with Neistat returning to New York City where the story began. On April 8, 2012, Nike launched the video on their official YouTube page titled Make It Count. The next day, Neistat launched the video on his own YouTube channel. Neistat's posting went viral, and within the first three days, the film had been viewed over 1.5 million times. By October 2022, the video had over 32 million views.

Mashable's Zoe Fox commented that it was "The Best Branding Story Ever Told". A number of mainstream outlets referred to Neistat's production of the film as "going rogue" including CNNGo, Fast Company and Conde Nast Traveler.

=== Beme ===
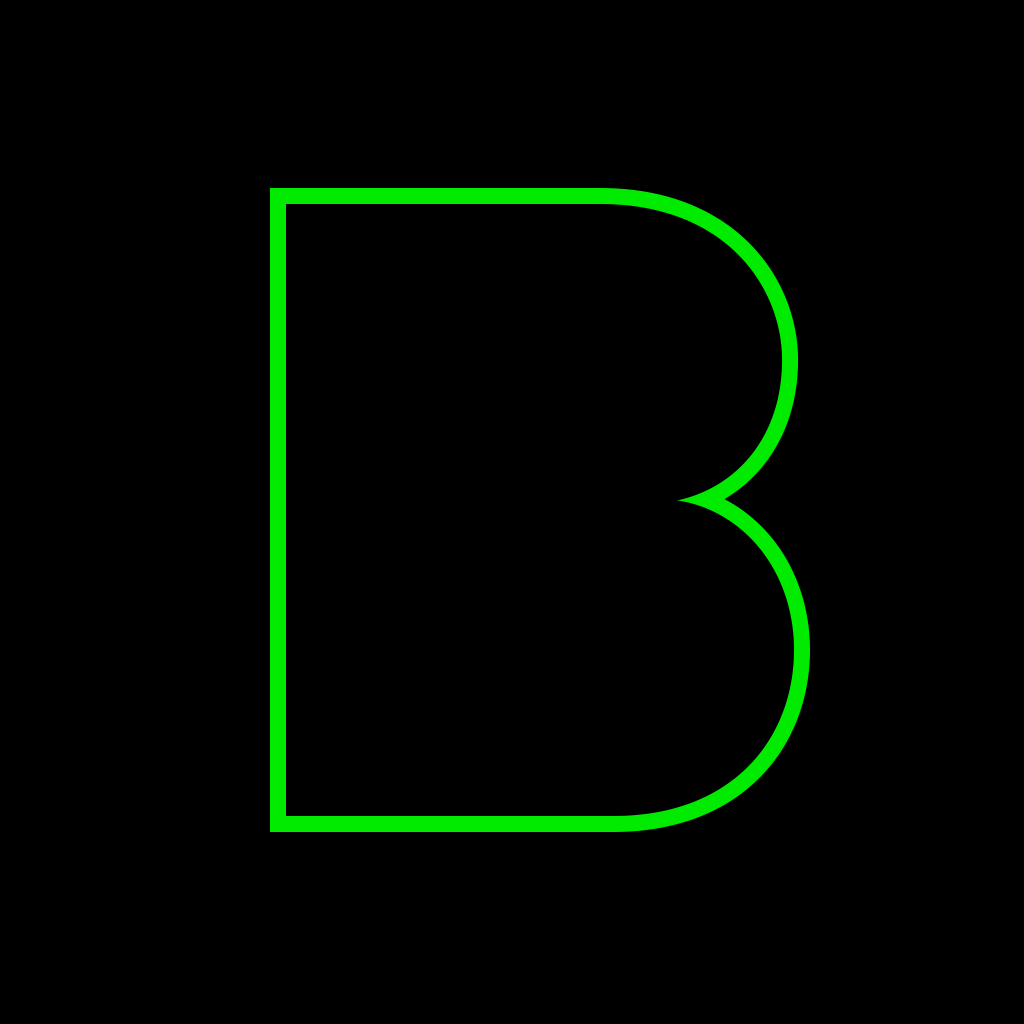
Beme logo

In a July 8, 2015 vlog, Neistat announced that he had been working with Matt Hackett on building a video-sharing app called Beme. Designed as an alternative to highly edited content found in social media, the app enabled users to produce unedited four-second videos, which were immediately uploaded and shared with the user's subscribers, without the ability to review the video. Users could respond to shared content by sending "reactions", photographs of themselves, back to the video uploader.

Beme released the first version of the app on July 17, 2015. Shortly after the launch, BuzzFeed described Beme's minimalist design as "deceptively simple and decidedly weird." The New York Times described Beme's user experience "as if the phone becomes a stand-in for one's body, the camera facing outward to capture what the user is experiencing." Within eight days of the app's release, Beme users had shared 1.1 million videos and logged 2.4 million reactions.

On November 28, 2016, CNN announced that it would acquire the Beme company, reportedly for US$25 million. At the same time, Hackett announced that the Beme app would be shutting down on January 31, 2017, saying: "Beme as a single product failed. Beme as a vision for the kind of technology and media that must be built is just getting started."

On January 25, 2018, Neistat and Hackett announced that they were severing their ties with CNN, but that most Beme employees would continue to work for CNN.

=== 368 ===
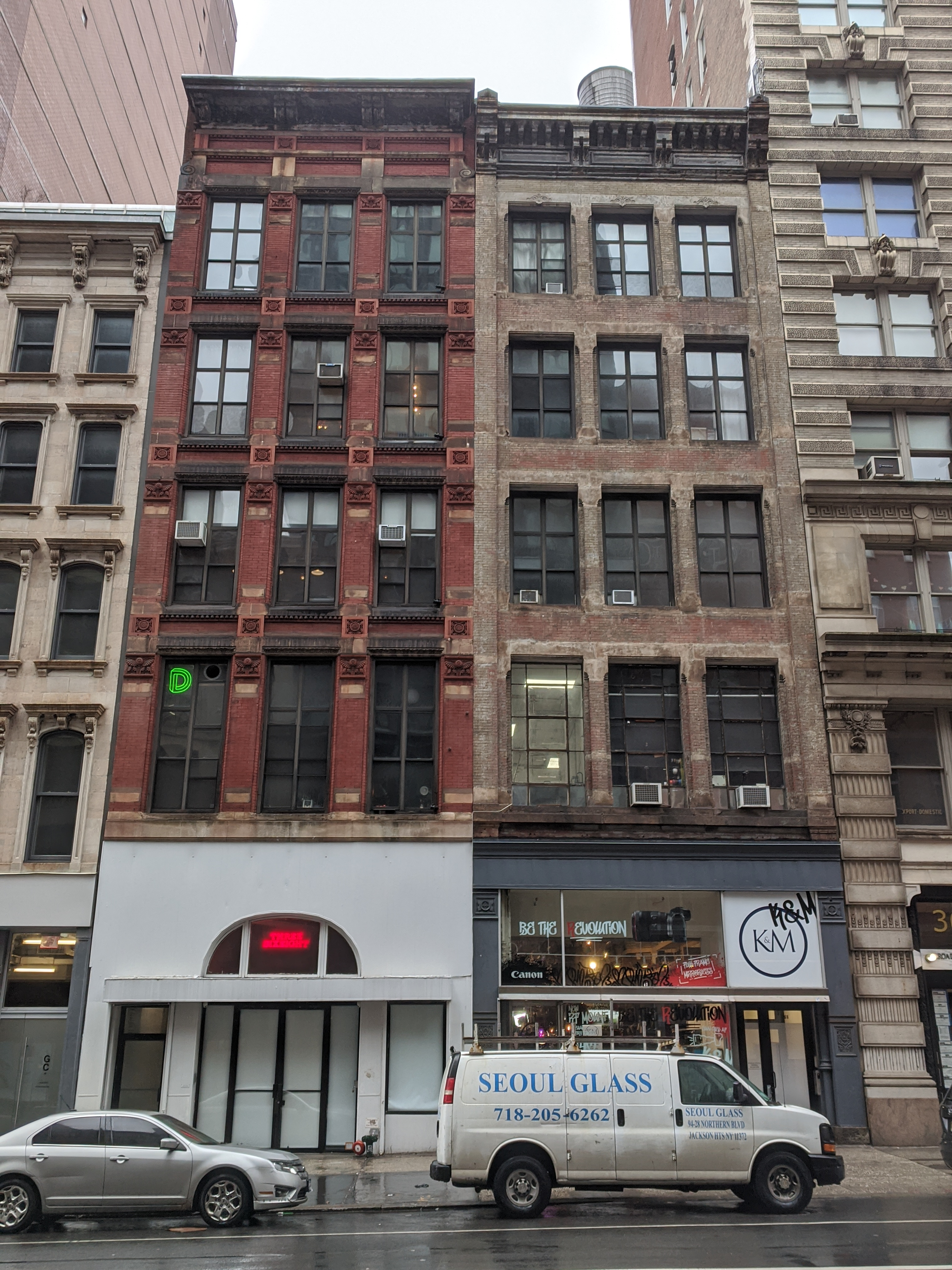
Office for 368 at 370 Broadway (left) and Neistat's studio at 368 Broadway (right)

On April 5, 2018, Neistat announced a new project: 368 (named after the address of Neistat's studio at the time, 368 Broadway, New York), a creative space for creators to collaborate. On April 12 of that year, Patreon CEO Jack Conte announced a potential collaboration with Neistat on the project.

On February 16, 2024, 368 announced its closure on Instagram.

=== Couples Therapy ===
Neistat's podcast Couples Therapy ran for 20 episodes, from May 4, 2018 to April 15, 2019. On the show, Neistat and his wife Candice Pool discussed the up and downs of their marriage, friendship, parenting and lives in the YouTube spotlight.

=== Appearances ===
Neistat has a chapter giving advice in Tim Ferriss's book Tools of Titans.

=== Public speaking ===
Neistat has lectured on topics related to filmmaking and his life experiences including giving public lectures, speaking at The Nantucket Project and giving a TEDx talk at TEDxParkerSchool.

== Personal life ==
In 2005, Neistat eloped with Candice Pool in Houston, Texas. This marriage lasted about a month and ended with an annulment. He later reconciled with Pool and got engaged to her on February 18, 2013. On December 29, 2013, Neistat and Pool were married in a Jewish wedding service in Cape Town, South Africa. They have two daughters, Francine and Georgie.

His grandmother Louise Neistat (born Louise Celice Grossman) was a tap dancer and one of the Radio City Music Hall's Rockettes during World War II. In 2004, he directed a video in which his grandmother made the "world's greatest french toast", and delivered it to his son, Owen. On October 31, 2011, Neistat posted a four-minute short film on YouTube about his grandmother. The video opens with him asking his grandmother how many more years she thinks she will put on her annual tap dance show, then inter-cuts various press clippings from her accomplished life with footage from her most recent tap dance show, the focus being the money her tap dancing has raised for cancer research-related charities. The video was tweeted by YouTube's official Twitter handle and appeared on numerous news and viral video websites, including the Huffington Post. Twenty-two days after the video was posted, Louise died of natural causes at the age of 92; Neistat wrote her obituary and delivered the eulogy. Louis Nye was his great-uncle.

On May 10, 2019, Neistat announced that he would be leaving New York City and moving to Los Angeles to be with his family, in a video titled "i'M Leaving NYC Forever..". On September 14, 2022, Neistat uploaded a video stating he was moving back to New York City.

Neistat is a part of the ownership group of Angel City of the National Women's Soccer League.

Neistat is an accomplished runner, having finished a marathon in 2:57 and completed three Ironman Triathlons, with at least one of those being completed in less than 12 hours.

=== Political views ===
Neistat supported Democrat Hillary Clinton in the 2016 United States presidential election. On October 11, 2016, Neistat released a video titled "who im voting for president", in which he said that people having different opinions is "the nature of a healthy democracy, ... but this is not that", stating that the 2016 United States presidential election was different, and that the "election had very little to do with politics, policy or legislation". Neistat received criticism for saying in the video that creators who did not endorse Hillary Clinton were "complicit" with Trump's "lying, racist, misogynist(ic)" attributes and were "partially responsible for handing him (Donald Trump) reins of power". On September 27, 2019, Neistat acknowledged that he should have taken a more "effective" route to making the video as he was "too upset, angry and emotional" when it was made. He also said the video lacked "diplomacy", and that he still feels the same way about Trump.

Neistat supported Democrat Joe Biden in the 2020 United States presidential election.

=== Support for Israel ===
Neistat is a secular Jew and is very vocal in his support of Israel. As a youth, Neistat attended Birthright Israel, which he compared to summer camp or a field trip. In 2014, he claimed that "Hamas is dangerous to the people of Israel and more dangerous to the victims in Palestine".

On October 11 2023, following the October 7 attacks, Neistat uploaded a YouTube video titled "Jew" in which he discusses antisemitism, quotes Hamas' outdated, though not entirely repudiated charter, and espouses elements of the Hamas baby beheading hoax, proven to be misinformation created by the IDF. Also in October, Neistat signed the "No Hostage Left Behind" open letter, asking US president Joe Biden to ensure the release of hostages kidnapped by Hamas during the October 7 attacks. This letter also espoused elements of the baby beheading hoax. In an email campaign sent to prominent influencers, the group Hostages and Missing Families Forum claimed that Casey Neistat supported their campaign, stating that "Our group has created a library of explainer videos that can be used directly on your platforms with hashtags #HAMASisISIS and #StandWithIsrael. Top Influencers and Creators already supported: Kim Kardashian, Madonna, Gal Gadot, Casey Neistat... and many others."

Neistat has visited Israel several times following the October 7 attacks. In June 2024, Neistat was the keynote speaker at the Nas Daily summit in Tel Aviv. At the summit, Neistat spoke about what he called "hate speech" against him following his comments on the October 7 attacks. On the one year anniversary of the October 7 attacks, Neistat stated that it had "been a tough year to be a Jew" and that he had met with a victim of the attack while in Israel a few months earlier. In November 2024, during an interview with YouTuber Jon Youshaei, Casey Neistat paused the interview to wave an oversized Israel flag at passing by Gaza war protestors. Neistat went on to say in the interview that "I don’t just believe, I’m convinced of the fact that Israel has every right to exist and when attacked, Israel has every right to protect itself and fight back". Neistat has also met with several members of Israeli government, including Israeli president Isaac Herzog and Israeli government spokesman Eylon Levy.

== Filmography ==
=== Film ===
Year	Film	Credited as					Notes
Year	Film	Director	Producer	Writer	Actor	Role	Notes
2008	The Pleasure of Being Robbed	No	Executive	No	No		
2009	Daddy Longlegs	No	Yes	No	Yes		
2010	The Light Bulb Conspiracy	No	No	No	Yes	Himself	
2011	3x3	Yes	No	No	No		
2016	Nerve	No	No	No	Yes	Himself	
2020	Project Power	No	No	No	Yes	Moto	
2022	Under the Influence	Yes	Yes	No	No		

=== Television ===
Year	Film	Credited as					Notes
Year	Film	Director	Producer	Writer	Actor	Role	Notes
2010	The Neistat Brothers	Yes	Yes	Yes	Yes	Himself	
2011	Alter Egos	No	No	Yes	No		1 episode
2018	The Untitled Action Bronson Show	No	No	No	Yes	Himself	1 episode

== Awards and nominations ==
Year	Award	Category	Result	Notes
2010	Independent Spirit Awards	John Cassavetes Award	Won	with Tom Scott
2016	Shorty Awards	YouTuber of the Year	Won	
2016	GQ Men of the Year	New Media Star	Won	
2016	Streamy Awards	Entertainer of the Year	Won	
2016	Streamy Awards	Best First-Person Series	Won	
2016	Streamy Awards	Cinematography	Nominated	
2017	Streamy Awards	Creator of the Year	Nominated	
2017	Streamy Awards	First Person	Nominated	
2017	Streamy Awards	Cinematography	Won	
2017	Streamy Awards	Editing	Nominated	
2018	Streamy Awards	Creator of the Year	Nominated	
2018	Streamy Awards	First Person	Nominated	
2018	Streamy Awards	Cinematography	Nominated	
2018	Streamy Awards	Editing	Nominated	
2018	Streamy Awards	Podcast	Nominated	Couples Therapy with Candice and Casey
