= Tunde Lemo =

Nigerian banker

Tunde Lemo or Tunde O. Lemo (born 1959) is a Nigerian banker and former deputy governor of operations and director of the Central Bank of Nigeria. As of 2018, he serves as chairman of the Federal Roads Maintenance Agency (FERMA).

== Early life and education ==
Lemo was born in 1959, and is a native of Ogun State. His mother, Eunice Olufolake Lemo (11 November 1932 — 9 May 2018), was a school teacher.

Lemo attended the University of Nigeria Nsukka, where he graduated with First Class Honours in Accounting in 1984, and in 1997, became a Fellow of the Institute of Chartered Accountants of Nigeria. He is also a Fellow of the Chartered Institute of Bankers.

== Career ==
He started his career from Arthur Anderson & Co in 1985 and from 2000 to 2003, Lemo served as managing director of Wema Bank Plc, and in 2003, became the deputy governor of operations and director of the Central Bank of Nigeria—serving as its deputy governor of financial surveillance sector.

On 2 January 2004 Lemo became the director and chairman of the Abuja Securities & Commodity Exchange Plc.

He was a non-executive director of Africa Finance Corporation since 16 May 2007.

On Friday 6 October 2017 President Muhammadu Buhari of Nigeria approved his appointment as the new chairman of the Federal Emergency Road Maintenance Agency (FERMA). He effectively became a chairman of the agency in July 2018 joined by six new members of the board and a new managing director.

Today, as the former Chairman of the boards of Titan Trust Bank and Flutterwave, he continues to lend his expertise as an active member of numerous other boards.

On Monday 2 October 2021, Tunde blamed infrastructural decay as the reason why investors run away from Nigeria.

On Thursday 23 December 2021 Union Bank of Nigeria Plc, in a disclosure filed with the Nigerian Exchange Limited (NGX), announced that Tunde Lemo owned Titan Trust Bank Limited has reached an agreement with Union Global Partners Limited and other shareholders to acquire a combined 89.39 percent stake in Union Bank of Nigeria Plc.
