= Ashish Thakkar =

Rwandan-based entrepreneur (born 1981)

Ashish J Thakkar
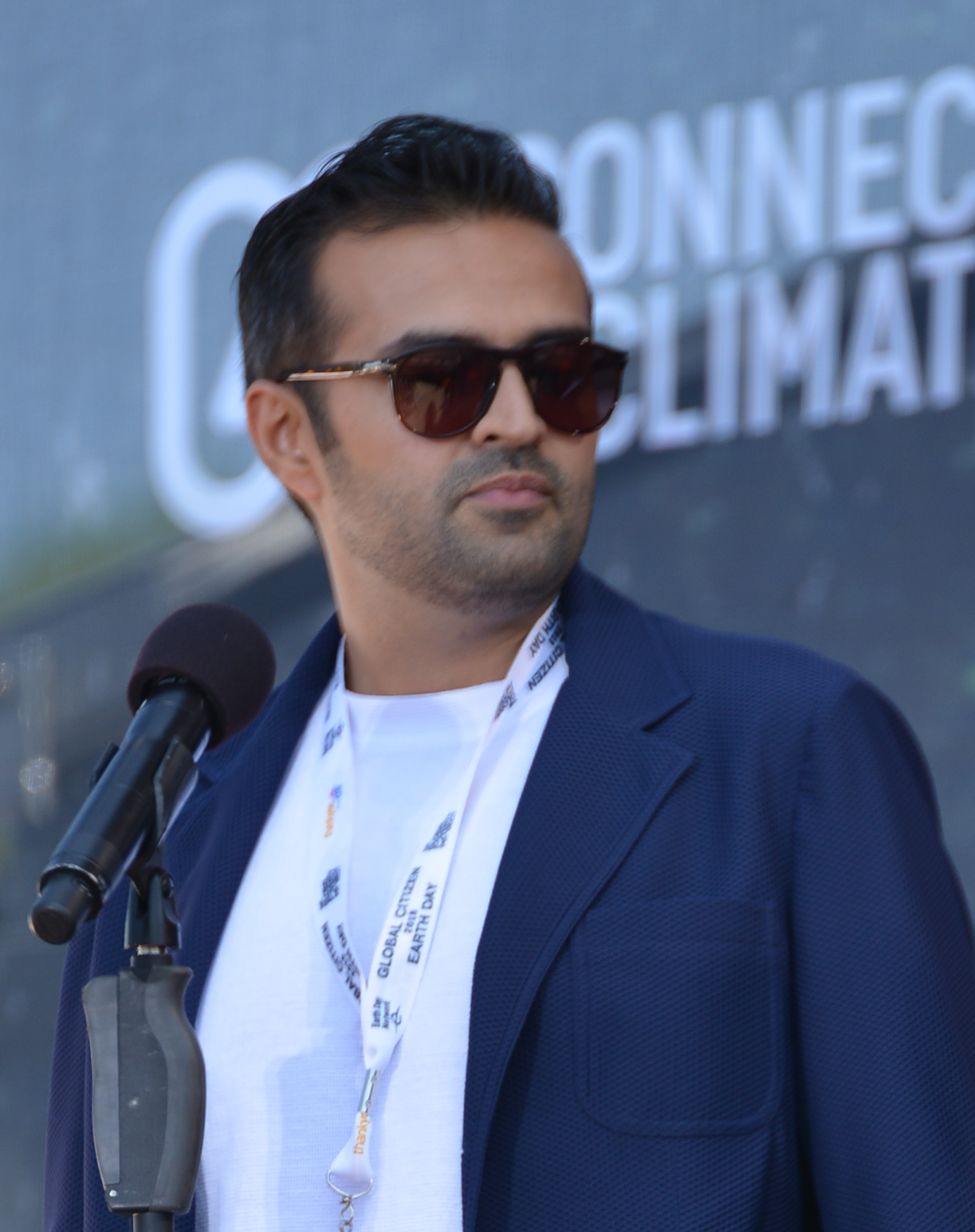
- Thakkar in 2015
- Born: 5 August 1981 (age 45); Leicester, United Kingdom
- Occupations: Founder, Mara Group & Mara Foundation
- Years active: 1996 - present
- Organization: Mara Corporation
- Known for: Founding Mara Group; Co-founding Atlas Mara
- Spouse: {{Marriage | Krishna A. Thakkar | 2018
- Children: Yagna A. Thakkar, Avadhi A. Thakkar
- Parents: Jagdish Thakkar; Sarla Thakkar
- Website: www.ashishjthakkar.com

Ashish J. Thakkar is an East African entrepreneur, who achieved recognition as the founder of the Mara Group and Mara Foundation, as well as the co-founder of Atlas Mara Limited. Thakkar was born in the United Kingdom, but he moved to East Africa as a teenager before founding Mara Group, a Pan-African conglomerate, at the age of 15. Today, Mara Group's operations and investments span across 22 African countries. Additionally, Thakkar authored the book The Lion Awakes: Adventures in Africa's Economic Miracle.

Thakkar is a member of the World Economic Forum's Young Global Leaders, and was included in Fortune magazine's list of the top "40 Under 40" in 2013. Moreover, he was awarded the Base Leadership Award at the 2014 MTV Africa Music Awards event. In 2016, American magazine Esquire named him Middle East Man of the Year.

In 2015, Thakkar was appointed Chair of the United Nations Foundation's Global Entrepreneurs Council, while in 2017, he was appointed Chair of the Presidential Youth Advisory Group at the African Development Bank.

== Early life and education ==
Thakkar's family emigrated from the Indian state of Gujarat to Africa in the 1890s. Thakkar was born in Leicester in 1981. He spent his childhood at Rushey Mead School as part of the Belvoir S form group. His parents had been forced to emigrate to the United Kingdom in 1972 when Ugandan dictator Idi Amin enforced the expulsion of Asians from Uganda. Thakkar and his family eventually returned to Africa to live in Rwanda; however, they were again forced to leave due to the Rwandan genocide in 1994. The Thakkar family then fled to Burundi before settling in Uganda as refugees. At the age of 15, Thakkar dropped out of school to start his own business with a $5,000 loan.

== Career ==
Thakkar founded his own company, Mara Group, in 1996 at the age of 15. He began by importing computer parts, including keyboards, computer mice, and desktops, from weekly trips to Dubai. After Thakkar had received a $5,000 loan to start his company, he opened the small IT business in a shopping mall across the street from his father's shop in Kampala.

Over the next ten years, Thakkar expanded Mara Group into manufacturing, real estate, agriculture, and IT services. Thakkar later relocated the company headquarters to Dubai, but kept business in Africa.

In 2013, Thakkar announced a partnership with Bob Diamond to launch Atlas Mara, a company that invests in commercial banking institutions across Africa. Diamond, the former chief executive of Barclays, and Thakkar met at a conference through their foundations, the Mara Foundation and the Diamond Family Foundation. Thakkar and Diamond raised $325 million in funding in December 2013, before listing the company on the London Stock Exchange. The stock price has continued to decline steadily, eventually losing 95% of its IPO price. The ticker symbol in London is ATMA.LN, while in the United States, the ticker is AAMAF.

== Other activities ==
Thakkar founded Mara Foundation, a non-profit company that mentors and supports young African entrepreneurs, in 2009. Mara Mentor, a mobile application that connects young entrepreneurs with business professionals, was launched through Mara Foundation.

In June 2014, Thakkar participated in the "Global Accelerator" event hosted by the United Nations Foundation and the United Nations Office for Partnerships to discuss entrepreneurship in UN objectives. Thakkar presented and worked at the event of over 100 entrepreneurs and UN officials, including Michael Dell, Barbara Bush, and Arianna Huffington. In August 2014, Thakkar participated in the US-Africa summit, hosted by the White House, alongside former U.S. President Bill Clinton. He has also participated in the UN Women Initiative and was a guest speaker at the Emirates Foundation Youth Philanthropy Summit in November 2014.

== Personal life ==
Thakkar was married to Meera Menak a travel and food writer. In the summer of 2014 she filed a divorce after 5 years of marriage. A messy divorce at a London divorce court exposed his finances and attracting scrutiny into his business dealings. Thakkar told a family court judge in London that he not a billionaire and was worth only £445,532 and that Mara Group was owned by his mother and sister and that he held no stake in the company that he fronted. This was disputed by his wife in the long running divorce dispute which included who should get a ticket on a commercial space flight.

== See also ==
- Atlas Mara Co-Nvest Limited
