= Bob Diamond (banker) =

Anglo-American banker and business executive

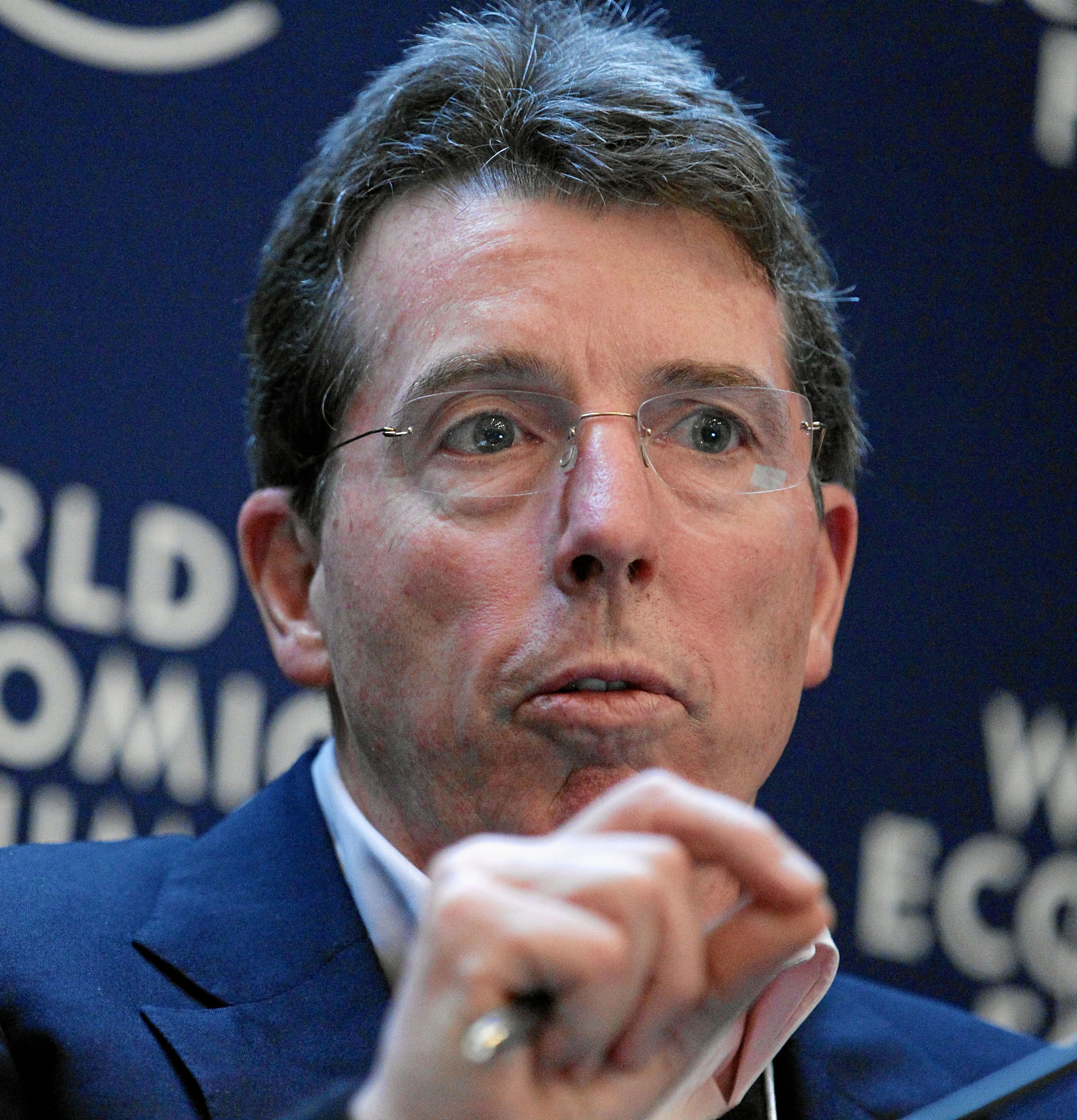
- Diamond in 2012
- Born: Robert Edward Diamond Jr. July 27, 1951 (age 75)
- Education: Colby College (BA); University of Connecticut (MBA)
- Occupation: Banker
- Years active: 1979–present
- Employer(s): Morgan Stanley (1979–1992); CS First Boston (1992–1996); Barclays (1996–2012); Atlas Mara (2013 to date)
- Spouse: Jennifer Diamond
- Children: 3

Robert Edward Diamond Jr. is an American banker and former chief executive officer of Barclays plc. In 2010, he became its president and deputy group chief executive; and in January 2011, succeeded John Varley as group chief executive of Barclays.

Diamond resigned as chief executive of Barclays after a Bank of England hearing on July 3, 2012, following controversy over manipulation of Libor interest rates by traders employed by the bank.

== Early years and education ==
One of nine children, Diamond grew up in a Roman Catholic family of Irish descent. His parents, Anne and Robert Edward Diamond Sr. were both teachers.

He finished his schooling from Concord-Carlisle High School in 1969 and in 1973, obtained a B.A. in economics with honours from Colby College in Waterville, Maine. He was a member of the Phi Delta Theta fraternity at Colby. He was awarded an MBA from the University of Connecticut Business School, graduating first in his class.

== Banking career ==
=== Early years and Morgan Stanley: 1976 to 1992 ===
Diamond began his career as a lecturer at the School of Business, University of Connecticut from 1976 to 1977. Diamond then briefly worked for United States Surgical Corporation in Norwalk, Connecticut, in the IT department. He joined Morgan Stanley in 1979 and held several positions. He rose to the post of managing director and head of fixed income trading division.

=== CS First Boston: 1992 to 1995 ===
Diamond joined CS First Boston in 1992. Based in Tokyo, he was chairman, president and chief executive officer of CS First Boston Pacific, responsible for investment banking, equity, fixed income and foreign exchange for the Pacific region. Diamond was formerly vice chairman and head of global fixed income and foreign exchange. He was forced out in 1995 after a division-wide dispute over the bonus pool.

=== Barclays PLC: 1996 to 2012 ===
Diamond joined Barclays on July 4, 1996, and in September 1997 became a member of the executive committee of the company, Britain's second largest banking group.

Diamond was appointed chief executive of corporate & investment banking and wealth management, comprising Barclays Capital, Barclays Corporate and Barclays Bank, and was an executive director of the boards of Barclays Plc and Barclays Bank Plc.

Diamond became a leading candidate to succeed Matthew Barrett as group chief executive of Barclays Plc in 2004, but that post instead went to John Varley, who was five years younger than Diamond. In 2005, Diamond was appointed president of Barclays Plc and joined its board of directors, while also remaining chief executive of Barclays Capital.

On 30 June 2006, The Wall Street Journal ran a front page, column one, article detailing how Barclays Capital was making a giant portion of its income not through legitimate investment banking activities but through a tax dodge, a so-called "double dip", which was essentially paid for by the British and American taxpayer. The revelation angered Parliament, the Bank of England, and UK and US tax authorities and the scam was outlawed. It also contributed to Peter Mandelson, UK Business Secretary, labelling Diamond "the unacceptable face of banking".

Diamond headed Barclays' bid to purchase Lehman Brothers in September 2008, but that was stymied by the Bank of England, thereby avoiding Barclays buying an investment bank that was later known to be bankrupt. Diamond then sealed an agreement with Lehman Brothers President and COO Bart McDade to purchase key assets of that firm after it filed for bankruptcy, which instantly gave Barclays an investment banking foothold on Wall Street. Diamond became deputy group chief executive on October 1, 2010, and then succeeded John Varley as Group Chief Executive on January 1, 2011.

On July 2, 2012, Barclays' chairman, Marcus Agius, resigned following the heavy fine that Barclays suffered as a result of some of their company employees being involved in manipulating the London Interbank Offered Rate, which became known as the LIBOR scandal. Just 24 hours later, on July 3, Diamond resigned his post with immediate effect. Diamond's longtime protege, Jerry del Missier, who had been appointed chief operating officer of Barclays on June 22, 2012, resigned on July 2, 2012.

==== "Double Dip" tax scams ====
The "Double Dip" tax scams were simple. Barclays and an American bank would loan, for example, an airline for the purchase of a jumbo jet. A subsidiary without any employees would be set up owned by Barclays and the American bank to handle the transaction, and the subsidiary would pay income tax on the interest income. The scam would come into effect when both Barclays and the American bank would claim the same full tax credit amount with their respective UK and American tax authorities, i.e. essentially Barclays' income from the scam was being paid for by British and American taxpayers without the respective governments and tax authorities knowing what was going on. Barclays was making over £1 billion a year from the practice. This practice ended after The Wall Street Journal published an exposé of the dodge in a front page, column one, article on 30 June 2006 by Carrick Mollenkamp, which ensured that Parliament, the Bank of England, and the UK Inland Revenue and the American Internal Revenue Service would see it and become aware of the scam, and the practice was subsequently outlawed, thus eliminating a major source of income for Barclays. It also resulted in Diamond's reputation being tarnished with Parliament and The Bank of England and the beginning of his being branded "the unacceptable face of banking".

==== Libor scandal investigation ====
In June 2012, Barclays was fined £59.5 million by the FSA (£290 million in total) for "serious, widespread breaches of City rules relating to the Libor and Euribor rates". The bank had been found to have lied, sometimes to make a profit, and other times to make the bank look more secure during the financial crisis. The UK's Financial Services Authority (FSA), which levied a fine of £59.5 million (US$92.7 million), gave Barclays the biggest fine it had ever imposed in its history. The FSA's director of enforcement described such behaviour as "completely unacceptable", adding "Libor is an incredibly important benchmark reference rate, and it is relied on for many, many hundreds of thousands of contracts all over the world." Liberal Democrat politician Lord Oakeshott criticised Diamond, saying: "If he had any shame he would go. If the Barclays board has any backbone, they'll sack him." The U.S. Department of Justice had also been involved in the investigation. Diamond announced on June 29, 2012, that he would not resign over the bank's role in the fraud. Diamond voluntarily gave up his bonus for 2012 but initially maintained that he would remain as chief executive. However, following widespread anger at his refusal to step down and amidst concerns that his presence could be harmful to the Barclays brand, he resigned as chief executive on July 3, 2012.

According to an article in The New York Times published July 16, 2012, a former senior Barclays executive claimed he had received instructions from Robert Diamond to lower Libor rates after Diamond's discussions with Paul Tucker, deputy governor of the Bank of England, in which they had discussed the bank's financial position at the height of the 2008 financial crisis. Diamond, who reported that he was "sickened" by news of the Libor scandal, was surprised to see calls for his departure since Barclays had taken the advice of its lawyers to cooperate in the investigation and be first bank to settle the charges.

Diamond's resignation under pressure was controversial. The New York Times noted that Diamond's role in the scandal was minimal and suggested that the real reason for his sacking was that he had become the "unacceptable face of banking". The Financial Times reported that "After the financial crisis, the British establishment became very divided over what's the model for the big banks that we want to see. Bob represented investment banking big time. He represented the success of it — but also the sense that investment banking is dicey and not a completely sound business. He represented a way of doing business that we've become very uncomfortable with." In March 2013, Diamond was set to be paid about £2m ($3m) in July, a year after he left the bank following its Libor interest rate fixing scandal.

=== Atlas Mara Limited: 2013 to date ===
On November 28, 2013, Diamond and Rwandan-based entrepreneur Ashish Thakkar founded Atlas Mara, a company whose focus is banking in the African continent. The company was listed on the Alternative Investment Market in the UK on December 17, 2013 through an IPO which raised US$325 million. As of 22 November 2024, the stock price had crashed and had lost 99.999% of its IPO price (issued at £10.20, last trade was on 31 May 2024 at 0.0001 pence) and has effectively ceased trading. The ticker symbol in London is "ATMA.LN". It trades in the United States on the Pink Sheets under the ticker symbol "AAMAF". Diamond stepped down from management of Atlas Mara in February 2019 but remains a director.

== Personal life ==
Diamond married his wife, Jennifer, an engineer from Michigan, in 1983. They have three children.

Diamond is a Republican and was an adviser to Conservative Mayor of London Boris Johnson in 2008.

Diamond is chairman of the board of trustees of Colby College in Waterville, Maine; chairman of Old Vic Productions Plc; trustee of The Mayor's Fund for London; he was a member of the advisory board, Judge Business School at Cambridge University; member of international advisory board, British–American Business Council; life member of the Council on Foreign Relations; and member of the Atlantic Council.

Diamond, along with his wife Jennifer, is a founding circle member of The Nantucket Project, an annual festival of ideas on Nantucket, Massachusetts.

In 2011 he was included in the 50 Most Influential ranking of Bloomberg Markets Magazine before his ethics problems were revealed and the Bank of England terminated his employment at Barclays.

Business positions
Preceded by John Silvester Varley	Group Chief Executive of Barclays plc January 1, 2011 – July 3, 2012	Succeeded by Antony Jenkins
