= Mara Group =

Privately held multinational conglomerate

Mara
- Trade name: Mara group
- Type: Private limited company
- Industry: Conglomerate
- Founded: 1996
- Founder: Ashish J. Thakkar
- Headquarters: Dubai, United Arab Emirates
- Area served: Africa, Middle East and Indian Sub-Continent
- Key people: Jagdish Thakkar, Chairman; Ashish J. Thakkar; Founder and CEO
- Products: Financial services Infrastructure; Technology; BPO; Real Estate; Investment Advisory
- Number of employees: Approximately 11,000 (2014)
- Website: maraphones.com

Mara Corporation Ltd (trading as "'Mara Group) is a privately held multinational conglomerate based in Dubai, United Arab Emirates. It operates across several sectors including Technology, Financial services, Manufacturing, Real estate and Agriculture. The company was founded by Ashish J. Thakkar in 1996, and is now active in 24 countries. As of 2014, it employed approximately than 11,000 people.

== Description ==
Mara was founded in 1996 by Ashish J. Thakkar, an East African entrepreneur of Indian heritage. The company grew into an International multi-sector business, with operations and interests across 24 countries including 22 in Africa. In 2010, the Mara Group was selected by the World Economic Forum as a Global Growth Company. As of 2014, the company employed over 11,000 people across its various investments and subsidiaries.

The companies social impact arm, the Mara Foundation was launched in 2009 to support African entrepreneurs. It provides Mentorship, business incubation, and funding, primarily through digital platforms.
