= Ngonye Hydroelectric Power Station =

Power station in Zambia

- Location of Ngonye Falls Power Station; Placement on map is approximate Ngonye Hydroelectric Power Station (Africa) Ngonye Hydroelectric Power Station (Earth)
- Official name: Ngonye Falls Hydroelectric Power Station
- Location: Sioma, Sioma District, Western Province, Zambia
- Coordinates: 16°35′59″S 23°30′27″E
- Opening date: 2026 Expected
- Construction cost: US500 million
- Owner: Western Power Company

Dam and spillways
- Impounds: Zambezi River

Power Station
- Turbines: 4 x 45 MW
- Installed capacity: 180 MW (240,000 hp)
- Annual generation: 830 GWh

The Ngonye Falls Power Station, is a planned hydroelectric power station across the Zambezi River in Zambia. The power station will have maximum generating capacity of 180 megawatts (240,000 hp) when completely developed. The energy will be sold to ZESCO under a long-term power purchase agreement. It is named after the nearby Ngonye Falls.

== Location ==
The power station will be located on the east bank of the Zambezi River, near the town of Sioma, in the Sioma District of the Western Province of Zambia. Sioma is located approximately 175 kilometres (109 mi), by road, south of the city of Mongu, the provincial capital.

This is approximately 140 kilometres (87 mi) by road, northwest of the town of Sesheke at the international border with Namibia's Caprivi Strip.

== Overview ==
The power station will be a run-of-river type, without an impounding dam or large water reservoir. A 3 kilometres (2 mi) canal on the western bank of River Zambezi will divert the fast-running water to the power station, where the water will turn turbines to generate electricity. A new 220kiloVolt transmission line will convey the energy to the border town of Sesheke, where the energy will enter the national grid. While most of the power is intended for use in the Western Province of Zambia, some of it will be available for export to the members of the Southern African Power Pool.

== Ownership ==
Ngonye Falls Hydroelectric Power Station that is under development, is owned and is expected to be managed and operated by Western Power Company Limited, the special purpose vehicle company established by the consortium of investors in the power station. The table below illustrates the members of the consortium.

Ownership of Western Power Company
Rank	Shareholder	Domicile	Notes
1	InfraCo Africa	United Kingdom	
2	Africa Power Project Limited	Zambia	

Other partners, consultants and advisers on this project include (a) the Mott MacDonald Group, (b) the Multiconsult Group and the Development Bank of Southern Africa.

== Other considerations ==
The hydropower station with capacity of 180 megawatts is capable of generating 830 GWh of clean carbon free renewable energy annually. This is enough to supply 350,000 Zambian households.

== See also ==
- List of power stations in Zambia
- Ngonye Solar Power Station
