= Choma Solar Power Station =

Solar farm in Zambia

- Country: Zambia
- Location: Choma, Choma District, Southern Province, Zambia
- Coordinates: 16°46′30″S 27°01′48″E
- Status: Proposed
- Construction began: June 2024 Expected
- Commission date: September 2025 Expected
- Construction cost: US$ 65 million
- Owner: Choma Solar Power Plant Limited,
- Operator: Choma Solar Power Plant Limited,

Solar farm
- Type: Flat-panel PV

Power generation
- Nameplate capacity: 60 MW (80,000 hp) + 20 MWh

The Choma Solar Power Station is a solar power plant, under development in Zambia, with generation capacity of 60 megawatts and an attached 20 MWh battery energy storage system (BESS). The privately owned solar farm is being developed by a joint venture company, comprising "YEO Teknoloji Enerji ve Endustri AS" (YEO), a Turkish energy company and "GEI Power Limited", a Zambian independent power producer (IPP). The off-taker is ZESCO (Zambia Electricity Supply Corporation Limited), the national electricity utility, under a long-term power purchase agreement (PPA).

== Location ==
The power station would located in Choma District, in the Southern Province of Zambia. Choma, the district headquarters is located approximately 285 kilometres (177 mi), southwest of Lusaka, the national capital and the largest city in the country.

== Overview ==
This solar farm is the first grid-ready photovoltaic solar installation with an attached BESS in the country. The design calls for a ground-mounted solar panel layout, with maximum generation capacity of 60 megawatts. An attached 20 MWh BESS, based on lithium-battery technology will be incorporated in the design to allow the station to supply power even when sun is not up.

== Developers ==
The developers/owners of this power station have formed a special purpose vehicle (SPV) company to own, design, develop, construct, operate and maintain this power station. The name of the SPV company is Choma Solar Power Plant Limited. The ownership of the SPV company is as outlined in the table below.

Choma Solar Power Plant Limited Ownership
Rank	Shareholder	Domicile	Notes
1	YEO Teknoloji Enerji ve Endustri AS	Turkey	
2	GEI Power Limited	Zambia	

== Construction costs and timeline ==
The construction costs for the power station are reported as US$65 million. Construction is expected to begin in 2024, with commercial commissioning expected in September 2025. As of May 2024, the necessary feasibility, grid impact and environmental impact assessment studies had been concluded.

== Other considerations ==
As of April 2024, Zambia had installed generation capacity of 3,030 MW, of which 2,393 MW (79 percent) was derived from hydroelectric sources. Due to severe drought in the sub-region in recent months, the river levels are low and Zambian electricity output is low. As of February 2024, Zambia was grappling with a 500 MW deficit in electricity supply. This solar farm is expected to help to partially mitigate that shortage.

== See also ==
- List of power stations in Zambia
- Zambia Riverside Solar Power Station
- Itimpi Solar Power Station
