= List of power stations in Zambia =

Power stations in Zambia

Zambia has five large power stations, of which four are hydroelectric and one is thermal. A fifth hydroelectric power plant is under construction at Itezhi-Tezhi Dam (120MW) along with a coal powered power station at Maamba (300MW) as of 2015. There are also a number of smaller hydroelectric stations, and eight towns not connected to the national power transmission grid are served by diesel generators.

In 2014 the combined power generation from an installed capacity of 2,396MW was 14,453GWh, of which 91.2% came from hydroelectric plants.

The majority of the plants are owned and operated by ZESCO, the national power utility.

== Hydroelectric ==
=== Operational ===
Station	Capacity (MW)	Generation 2014 (GWh)	Type	Owner	Notes
Kafue Gorge	990 (upgraded from 900 to 990 by upgrading the 6 turbine generator units from 150MW to 165MW each)	6,666	dam	ZESCO	
Kafue Gorge Lower	600 (still under construction up to 750MW; 4 out of 5 by 150 MW generators each commissioned picking power station at 750MW for 3.5hrs a day by design)	910	dam	ZESCO	
Kariba North Bank	720 (upgraded from 600MW to 720MW by upgrading turbine generator units from 150MW to 185MW each)	3,990	dam	ZESCO	
Kariba North Bank Extension	360	1,162	dam	ZESCO	peaking plant
Itezhi-Tezhi	120		dam	ZESCO	
Victoria Falls	108	811	run-of-river	ZESCO	
Mulungushi	32	198.2	dam	LHPC (SN Power)	
Lunsemfwa	24	98.8	dam	LHPC (SN Power)	
Lunzua	14.8	3.52	run-of-river	ZESCO	upgraded from 0.75MW to 14.8MW in 2015
Lusiwasi	12	58.69	dam	ZESCO	
Chishimba Hydroelectric Power Station	15	73	Run-of-river	ZESCO	
Musonda Falls	5	20.47	run-of-river	ZESCO	
Shiwa Ngandu	1	0.71	run-of-river	ZESCO	
Zengamina	0.7		run-of-river	Zengamina	off-grid

=== Under construction ===
Station	Capacity (MW)	Fuel	Owner	Status
Kabompo	40	Hydro	Copperbelt Energy Corporation	commissioning - not known

== Thermal ==
=== Operational ===
Station	Capacity (MW)	Generation 2014 (GWh)	Fuel	Owner	Notes
Maamba Coal Power Station	300 (another 300 in development)		Coal	Maamba Collieries Limited	commissioned 2016
Ndola HFO	105	826	HFO	Ndola Energy Company	
Zambezi	2.35	2.5	diesel	ZESCO	decommissioned (off-grid)
Kabompo	1.55	3.01	diesel	ZESCO	decommissioned (off-grid)
Mwinilunga	1.5	3	diesel	ZESCO	decommissioned (off-grid)
Lukulu	1.5	2.33	diesel	ZESCO	off-grid
Luangwa	1.5	2.64	diesel	ZESCO	off-grid
Shangombo	1	0.74	diesel	ZESCO	off-grid
Chavuma	1	1.06	diesel	ZESCO	decommissioned (off-grid)
Mufumbwe	0.9	2.06	diesel	ZESCO	decommissioned (off-grid)
Nakambala	40		biomass	Zambia Sugar	

== Solar ==
Solar power station	Community	Coordinates	Fuel type	Capacity (megawatts)	Year completed	Name of owner	Notes
Bangweulu Solar Power Station	Kafue District	15°30′42″S 28°25′54″E	Solar	54	2019	Neoen	
Kalulushi Concentrated Solar Power Station	Kalulushi District	12°43′27″S 28°05′41″E	Solar	200	2024 expected	Kalulushi Solar Power Consortium	
Ngonye Solar Power Station	Kafue District	15°31′03″S 28°25′44″E	Solar	34	2019	Ngonye Power Company Limited	
Serenje Solar Power Station	Chitambo District	12°45′29″S 30°34′38″E	Solar	200	2023 expected	Ultra Green Corporation Zambia Limited	
Zambia Riverside Solar Power Station	Kitwe District	12°48′26″S 28°14′11″E	Solar	34	2023	Copperbelt Energy Corporation	
Choma Solar Power Station	Choma District	16°46′30″S 27°01′48″E	Solar	60	2025	Choma Solar Power Plant Limited	
Itimpi Solar Power Station	Kitwe District	12°41′42″S 28°10′51″E	Solar	60	2024	Copperbelt Energy Corporation	
Chisamba Solar Power Plant	Chisamba District		Solar	100	2025	ZESCO	

== Other projects ==
In March 2022, Chariot Limited of the United Kingdom together with Total Eren of France and Canadian mining giant First Quantum Minerals entered into a partnership to develop a 430MW solar and wind power project in Zambia.
