= Christopher Kang'ombe =

Member of Parliament in Zambia

Member of the National Assembly for Kamfinsa
- In office August 2021 – 15 May 2026
- Preceded by: Elalio Musonda

Mayor for Kitwe
- In office 2016–2021
- Preceded by: Kelvin Sinyangwe
- Succeeded by: Mpasa Mwaya

Ward councillor for Riverside Ward
- In office October 2006 – May 2016

Personal details
- Born: Christopher Chishimba Kang'ombe; 25 December 1984 (age 41) Kitwe, Zambia
- Party: Patriotic Front
- Children: 2
- Education: Copperbelt University
- Profession: Engineer

Christopher Chishimba Kang'ombe (born 25 December 1984) is the current member of Parliament for Kamfinsa constituency in Kitwe District, having been elected in 2021. He was previously the mayor of Kitwe in the Copperbelt Province between 2016 and 2021. He is an engineer by profession.

== Political career ==
Kang'ombe was first elected as a Zambian councillor whilst still studying in university (for Riverside Ward in Kwacha constituency), becoming the first Zambian to do so. He was a ward councillor for two terms (from 2006 to 2016) before becoming the mayor for Kitwe District for one term (2016 to 2021). He is the current member of parliament for Kamfinsa constituency, having been elected in 2021.

On 13 May 2026, Kang'ombe announced that he will not participate in the 2026 general election.
