= Lunsemfwa Lower Hydroelectric Power Station =

Hydroelectric power station in Zambia

- Map of Zambia showing the location of Lunsemfwa Lower Hydroelectric Power Station
- Country: Zambia
- Location: Luano District
- Coordinates: 14°38′46″S 29°07′05″E
- Purpose: Power
- Status: Proposed
- Construction began: 2023 Expected
- Opening date: 2027 Expected
- Construction cost: US$300 million
- Owner: Lunsemfwa Hydro Power Company

Dam and spillways
- Impounds: Lunsemfwa River

Reservoir
- Normal elevation: 1,300 m (4,300 ft)

Power Station
- Commission date: 2027 Expected
- Turbines: 3 x 85MW
- Installed capacity: 255 MW (342,000 hp)
- Annual generation: 1,630 GWh

Lunsemfwa Lower Hydroelectric Power Station, is a planned 255 MW (342,000 hp) hydroelectric power station in Zambia. The power station is under development by a consortium comprising Lunsemfwa Hydro Power Company (LHPC), a Zambian independent power producer and EleQtra, a United Kingdom-based financial and development company. The off-taker is planned to be Zambia Electricity Supply Corporation Limited (ZESCO), the national electricity utility parastatal company.

== Location ==
The power station would be located across the Lunsemfwa River, in Zambia's Central Province, downstream of the 40 MW Mulungushi Hydroelectric Power Station and the 18 MW Lunsemfwa Hydroelectric Power Station.

== Overview ==
The design calls for generation capacity of 255 megawatts. The power station is planned as a run of river project, without a large reservoir. The gross hydraulic head is planned at 488 metres (1,601 ft). Three penstocks each with diameter of 2.2 metres (7.2 ft) and 1,000 metres (3,281 ft) long, will carry water to three electric generators, each rated at 85 MW. The 1,630 GWh generated here annually are expected to be purchased by ZESCO for integration into the Zambian national grid.

== Developers ==
As far back as 2010, Lunsemfwa Hydro Power Company and InfraCo Africa Limited, planned to develop a power station on the Lunsemfwa River. At that time, a 120 MW project was anticipated at a projected cost of between US$220 million and US$275 million. Eleven years later, a 255 MW plant is planned with InfraCo passing the responsibility to her subsidiary EleQtra. The owner remains LHPC.

== Cost and timeline ==
The cost of construction is reported as approximately US$300 million. Construction is expected to start in 2023 and last approximately three years.

== See also ==
- Zambezi River
- List of power stations in Zambia
