= Serenje Solar Power Station =

Solar farm in Zambia

- Country: Zambia
- Location: Kosamu Village, Chitambo District, Central Province
- Coordinates: 12°45′29″S 30°34′38″E
- Status: Proposed
- Construction began: September 2021 (Expected)
- Commission date: March 2023
- Construction cost: US$336 million
- Owner: Ultra Green Corporation Zambia Limited

Solar farm
- Type: Flat-panel PV

Power generation
- Nameplate capacity: 200 MW (270,000 hp)

The Serenje Solar Power Station is a proposed 200 MW (270,000 hp) solar power plant in Zambia. The project is rated as the largest solar project in the country. The power station is under development by Ultra Green Corporation Zambia Limited, a subsidiary of Ultra Green Corporation Inc., an American independent power producer (IPP).

== Location ==
The power station would be located in Kosamu Village, in Chief Kabamba’s Area, in Chitambo District, in Zambia's Central Province. The solar farm would sit on 448 hectares (1,107 acres) of land.

== Overview ==
Serenje Solar Power Station is designed to have capacity of 200 megawatts. Its output is expected to be sold directly to the Zambia Electricity Supply Corporation (ZESCO). The long-term power purchase agreement (PPA) governing that transaction had not been signed yet, but was anticipated, as of July 2021. A new high voltage transmission power line will be constructed to convey the energy from the solar farm to the Zesco substation at Pensulo, where the power will enter the national electricity grid.

== Developers ==
The power station is being developed by an American IPP, by the name of Ultra Green Corporation Inc., thorough its wholly owned Zambian subsidiary, Ultra Green Corporation Zambia Limited. The Zambian subsidiary has obtained a license to design, fund, build and operate the solar farm.

== Construction costs, and commissioning ==
The construction costs have been budgeted at US$336 million. This investment would cover $216 million to develop the solar farm and another $120 million to construct the high voltage power line from Kosamu Village to Pensulo's ZESCO substation. The project has already created 465 jobs at the construction site. Construction is expected to start in September 2021, with commercial commissioning anticipated 15 to 18 months later.

== See also ==
- List of power stations in Zambia
- Bangweulu Solar Power Station
