= Lunsemfwa Hydro Power Company =

Zambian independent power producer

- Company type: Private
- Industry: Electric power generation
- Founded: 2001; 25 years ago
- Headquarters: Kabwe, Zambia
- Products: Electricity

Lunsemfwa Hydro Power Company Limited (LHPC), is an independent power producer (IPP) company based in the city of Kabwe in Zambia, with investments in the Central Province of the country. As of August 2022, the firm owns two operational hydroelectric power plants, with generation capacity of 58 MW. Another 455 MW, from two hydro power stations, are under development. The firm has ambitions to increase generation capacity to 500 MW in the medium term.

== Location ==
Lunsemfwa Hydro Power Company maintains its headquarters in Kabwe, in Zambia's Central Province. Kabwe is located approximately 143 kilometres (89 mi) north of Lusaka, the capital and largest city in the country.

== Overview ==
The firm was established in the early 2000s. As of August 2022, it owns a generation portfolio of 58 megawatts, including Mulungushi Hydroelectric Power Station (40 megawatts) and Lunsemfwa Hydroelectric Power Station (18 megawatts). Both of these were acquired in 2001, with financial backing from the World Bank. It is also involved in the development of Muchinga Hydroelectric Power Station (200 MW) and the Lunsemfwa Lower Hydroelectric Power Station (255 MW).

== Ownership ==
The company is majority owned by Agua Imara ACA Pte Ltd, which is 100% owned by Agua Imara AS, a subsidiary of the Norwegian Development Finance Institution, Norfund. That acquisition took place in 2011. The shareholding in LHPC is illustrated in the table below.

Shareholding In Lunsemfwa Hydro Power Company
Rank	Shareholder	Domicile	Percentage	Notes
1	Agua Imara ACA Pte Ltd	The Netherlands	51.0	
2	Others	Zambia	49.0	
	Total		100.00	

== Power stations ==
The table below illustrates the power stations in Lunsemfwa Hydro Power's generation portfolio as of August 2022. The list is not all inclusive.

Partial List of Power Stations Owned and Operated By Lekela Power
Rank	Power Station	Country	Capacity (MW)	% Owned	Notes
1	Mulungushi Hydroelectric Power Station	Zambia	40	100	
2	Lunsemfwa Hydroelectric Power Station	Zambia	18	100	
3	Muchinga Hydroelectric Power Station	Zambia	200	100	
4	Lunsemfwa Lower Hydroelectric Power Station	Zambia	255	100	

== See also ==
- Energy in Africa
- List of power stations in Zambia
