= Ngonye Solar Power Station =

Solar farm in Zambia

- Ngonye Solar Power Station
- Country: Zambia
- Location: Kafue District, Lusaka Province
- Coordinates: 15°31′03″S 28°25′44″E
- Status: Operational
- Commission date: 29 April 2019
- Construction cost: US$40 million
- Owner: Ngonye Power Company Limited
- Operator: Ngonye Power Company Limited

Solar farm
- Type: Standard PV

Thermal power station
- Primary fuel: Solar

Power generation
- Nameplate capacity: 34 MW (46,000 hp)
- Annual net output: 70 GW·h

Ngonye Solar Power Station (NSPS), is a 34 MW (46,000 hp) solar power plant in Zambia. The solar farm that was commercially commissioned in April 2019, was developed and is owned by a consortium comprising Enel Green Power of Italy, a multinational renewable energy corporation, and the Industrial Development Corporation of Zambia (IDC), a parastatal company. The power station cost about US$40 million to develop.

== Location ==
The power plant is located in the Lusaka South Multi-Facility Economic Zone, in Kafue District, in Lusaka Province, approximately 25.5 kilometres (16 mi), by road, southeast of the central business district of Lusaka, the capital of Zambia and the largest city in that country. The geographical coordinates of Ngonye Solar Power Station are 15°31'03.0"S, 28°25'44.0"E (Latitude:-15.517500; Longitude:28.428889), situated immediately south of Bangweulu Solar Power Station.

== Overview ==
The Government of Zambia, through IDC Zambia, working with the World Bank Group, as part of the bank's program "Scaling Solar", awarded the tender to develop this power station to Enel Green Power (EGP), a renewable energy subsidiary of Enel, the Italian multinational manufacturer and distributor of electricity and gas. EGP and IDC formed an ad-hoc joint venture company, Ngonye Power Company Limited, to design, build, own and operate this power plant. The energy generated here will be purchased by Zambia Electricity Supply Corporation Limited (ZESCO), under a 25-year power purchase agreement (PPA), at US$0.078 per kWh.

== Ownership ==
This power station is owned by a consortium whose members are illustrated in the table below. The members of the consortium formed a special purpose vehicle company Ngonye Power Company Limited, which operates and maintains the power station.

Ngonye Power Company Limited Ownership
| Rank | Shareholder | Domicile | Ownership (%) | Notes |
|---|---|---|---|---|
| 1 | Enel Green Power | Italy | 80.0 | |
| 3 | IDC Zambia | Zambia | 20.0 | |

== Funding, construction and timeline ==
The table below illustrates the sources of funding for this renewable energy infrastructure project:

Sources of Funding For Ngonye Solar Power Station
| Rank | Fund Source | Dollar Amount | % of Total | Notes |
|---|---|---|---|---|
| 1 | Enel | 4.8 million | 12.0 | Equity |
| 2 | IDC Zambia | 1.2 million | 3.0 | Equity |
| 3 | International Finance Corporation | 10.0 million | 25.0 | Loan |
| 3 | IFC–Canada Climate Change Program | 12.0 million | 30.0 | Loan |
| 4 | European Investment Bank | 12.0 million* | 30.0 | Loan |
| | Total | 40.0 million | 100.0 | |

- Note: Some figures are rounded up to balance table totals.

Construction began in August 2018, and commercial commissioning was achieved in April 2019.

== See also ==
- List of power stations in Zambia
- Bangweulu Solar Power Station
- Ngonye Hydroelectric Power Station
