= Maamba Coal Power Station =

Coal powered thermal power plant in Zambia

- Location of Maamba Coal Power Station in Zambia
- Country: Zambia
- Location: Maamba
- Coordinates: 17°21′11″S 27°11′11″E
- Status: Operational
- Commission date: August 2016
- Owner: Maamba Collieries Limited
- Operator: Maamba Collieries Limited MCPS (Zambia)

Thermal power station
- Primary fuel: Coal

Power generation
- Nameplate capacity: 2 x 150 MW: Unit I 2 x 150 MW: Unit II; Total: 600 MW

Maamba Coal Power Station (MCPS), is a 600 MW coal-fired thermal power station in Zambia. The power station comprises an operational 300 MW power station (Unit I) commercially commissioned in 2016 and a second 300 MW power station (Unit II), under development, as of July 2024. Unit II is an extension of Unit I. The output of this power station is sold directly to Zambia Electricity Supply Corporation Limited (ZESCO), the national electricity utility parastatal company, under long-term power purchase agreements for both units. The power station is owned by Maamba Collieries Limited, a subsidiary of Nava Bharat Ventures Limited, of India.

== Location ==
The power station is located in the town of Maamba, in Sinazongwe District, in the Southern Province of Zambia. Maamba is located approximately 342 kilometres (213 mi), southwest of the city of Lusaka, the national capital.

== Overview ==
In 2016, Maamba Collieries Limited commercially commissioned the 300 MW Unit I of this power station. This unit comprises two steam generators with capacity of 150 MW each. Coal supplied by Maamba Collieries is used to boil water. This generates steam, which is used to turn turbines which in turn generate electricity. The first unit (Unit I) was set up to mitigate national generation shortage due prevailing severe drought in the country and the continental region.

Due to more severe weather conditions and patterns in Zambia and Southern Africa, the power generation capacity deteriorated further. Maamba Collieries obtained authorization and financing to expand the existing power station by adding Unit II, with capacity of 300 MW as well.

== Ownership ==
The power station is 100 percent owned by Maamba Collieries Limited (MCL), a joint venture company registered in Zambia. The shareholding in MCL is as illustrated in the table below.

Shareholding In Maamba Collieries Limited (MCL)
Rank	Shareholder	Domicile	Percentage	Notes
1	ZCCM Investments Holdings Plc.	Zambia	35.0	
2	Nava Bharat Singapore Limited	Singapore	65.0	
	Total		100.00	

- Note 1: ZCCM Investments Holdings Plc. is 100 percent owned by the government of Zambia
- Note 2: Nava Bharat Singapore Limited is a subsidiary of NAVA Limited, an Indian industrial, mining, manufacturing and agribusiness conglomerate.

== Construction costs and timetable ==
The first phase (Unit I) was constructed at an estimated cost of about US$828 million. The financiers for that phase included Barclays Bank, Bank of China, Industrial and Commercial Bank of China, Standard Chartered, Industrial Development Corporation of South Africa and the Development Bank of Southern Africa. Sinosure of China provided project insurance.

As for the second phase, construction is slated to start in August 2024 and conclude in July 2026. The construction costs for Unit II is estimated at US$400 million, because Unit II shares some infrastructure with Unit I. The Zambian National Pension Fund is being considered for partial funding of this phase.

== See also ==
- List of power stations in Zambia
