= Zambia Riverside Solar Power Station =

Zambian solar farm

- Country: Zambia
- Location: Kitwe, Kitwe District, Copperbelt Province
- Coordinates: 12°48′26″S 28°14′11″E
- Status: Operational
- Construction began: December 2021
- Commission date: February 2023
- Construction cost: US$19.2 million
- Owner: Copperbelt Energy Corporation
- Operator: Copperbelt Energy Corporation

Solar farm
- Type: Flat-panel PV

Power generation
- Nameplate capacity: 34 MW (46,000 hp)
- Annual net output: 54.9 GWh

The Zambia Riverside Solar Power Station is a 34 megawatts solar power plant in Zambia. The privately owned solar farm was originally commissioned in April 2018, as a 1 MW power station by Copperbelt Energy Corporation (CEC), who own the energy infrastructure. In December 2021, CEC signed an engineering, procurement, and construction (EPC) contract with Sinohydro to expand the solar farm by 33 extra MW over the next 12 months. CEC transmits and distributes the power to its customers in the Copperbelt Province of Zambia.

== Location ==
The 1 MW power station was located on a piece of property measuring 1.1 hectares (2.7 acres), adjacent to the main campus of Copperbelt University, in the Riverside neighborhood in the city of Kitwe. The 33 MW expansion sits on 30 hectares (74 acres) of land in Kitwe District.

Kitwe is approximately 358 kilometres (222 mi) north of Lusaka, the national capital. The geographical coordinates of Zambia Riverside Solar Power Station are: 12°48'26.0"S, 28°14'11.0"E (Latitude:-12.807222; Longitude:28.236389).

== Overview ==
In April 2018, CEC commenced commercial use of its 1 MW solar power station in Kitwe, as an income-diversification enterprise. In December 2021, CEC contracted Sinohydro to expand the solar farm to 34 MW, with anticipated annual output of 56.5 GWh. The power station, whose original design consisted of 3,864 photovoltaic panels, each rated at 270 watts, was the first grid-connected solar plant in Zambia. The expansion includes construction of new 11kV evacuation transmission lines to a location where the energy enters the CEC grid.

== Construction costs and timeline ==
The construction costs for the expansion are reported as US$19.2 million, paid by CEC. Construction is expected to last approximately one year and conclude during the fourth quarter of 2022.

== Recent developments ==
In February 2023, the completed 34 MW solar farm was officially commissioned in the presence of Hakainde Hichilema, the Zambian Head of State. The new installation sits of 30 hectares (74 acres). Its annual output is calculated at 54.7 GWh, enough to energize 10,000 Zambian homes.

During expansion, 800 people were employed over a 10 months period at a total cost of US$22 million. During the expansion, 61,300 panels, connected to 150 solar inverters were installed. Work also included the construction of 4 kilometres (2 mi) of new transmission line and six transformer stations.

== See also ==
- List of power stations in Zambia
- Itimpi Solar Power Station
- ZESCO
