= Joseph Malanji =

Zambian politician (born 1965)

The Honorable Joseph Malanji
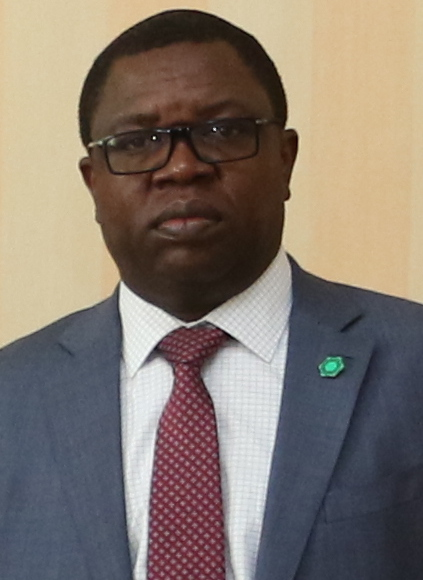
- Malanji in 2018

Minister of Foreign Affairs
- In office 2018–2021
- President: Edgar Lungu
- Preceded by: Harry Kalaba
- Succeeded by: Stanley Kakubo

Member of Parliament for Kwacha
- In office 23 September 2016 – 02 August 2022

Personal details
- Born: 28 August 1965 (age 61)
- Party: Patriotic Front (2011-present)
- Education: GCE

Joseph Malanji (born 28 August 1965) is a Zambian politician and business executive who previously served as a member of the National Assembly for Kwacha constituency. He was Minister of Foreign Affairs between 2018 and 2021.

== Career ==
Malanji was appointed by President Rupiah Banda to the National Executive Committee for Land and Natural Resources in 2011. Formerly a member of the Movement for Multi-Party Democracy, Malanji joined the Patriotic Front during the presidency of Banda's successor, Michael Sata. In 2013, Malanji was elected head of the African Golf Confederation. During the 2016 Zambian general election, Malanji was elected as a Member of Parliament to the constituency of Kwacha in the Copperbelt Province of Zambia. On 5 January 2018, President Edgar Lungu appointed Malanji as Minister of Foreign Affairs. As head of the SADC Electoral Observation Committee, Malanji was tasked with ensuring a fair and free Congolese general election. In 2017, Malanji served as one of Zambia's representatives to the Fourth Pan-African Parliament.

At the 2021 Zambian general election, Malanji stood again for the Kwacha constituency seat in Kitwe District and retained the seat. However, in August 2022, the Kwacha seat was nullified and Malanji lost his position as a Member of Parliament.

== Corruption trial ==
On 5 September, Malanji was sent to prison for 4 years following a lengthy trial in the Lusaka Magistrates Court in which he was accused of corruption including having bought 2 helicopters and collecting $11 Million from the Zambian Embassy in Turkey.

== Personal life ==
Malanji is married and enjoys golfing.
