= Itimpi Solar Power Station =

Solar farm in Zambia

- Country: Zambia
- Location: Kitwe, Kitwe District, Copperbelt Province
- Coordinates: 12°41′35″S 28°10′57″E
- Status: Operational
- Construction began: 2022
- Commission date: April 2024
- Construction cost: US$ 53 million
- Owner: Copperbelt Energy Corporation
- Operator: Copperbelt Energy Corporation

Solar farm
- Type: Flat-panel PV
- Site area: 80 hectares (198 acres)

Power generation
- Units operational: 109,144
- Nameplate capacity: 60 MW (80,000 hp)
- Annual net output: 130 GWh

The Itimpi Solar Power Station is a 60 megawatts solar power plant in Zambia. The privately owned solar farm was commissioned in April 2024. It was developed and is owned by Copperbelt Energy Corporation (CEC), through their 100 percent subsidiary CEC Renewables. CEC transmits and distributes the power to its customers in the Copperbelt Province of Zambia.

== Location ==
The power station is located on a piece of property measuring 80 hectares (200 acres), approximately 20 kilometres (12 mi), north of the central business district of the city of Kitwe. Kitwe is approximately 358 kilometres (222 mi) north of Lusaka, the national capital.

== Overview ==
This solar farm is the second photovoltaic solar installation in Kitwe District, owned by CEC. The other solar power station is the 34 megawatts Zambia Riverside Solar Power Station that was commissioned in 2023.

The design calls for a ground-mounted solar panel layout, with 109,144 "bifacial monocrystalline solar modules" arranged in rows along tracking devices which rotate the modules to maximize exposure to the rays of the sun at all times. The power generated here is fed through 200 inverters and into the CEC electricity grid for transmission and distribution to end-users. The capacity output is planned at 60 MW, with 130 GWh of annual output.

== Construction costs and timeline ==
The construction costs for the power station are reported as US$53 million, funded by a portion of the $200 million green bond listed by CEC on the Lusaka Stock Exchange. In April 2024, the completed 60 MW solar farm was officially commissioned by Hakainde Hichilema, the Zambian Head of State. During construction an estimated 1,200+ skilled and unskilled jobs were created.

== Other considerations ==
As of April 2024, Zambia had installed generation capacity of 3,030 MW, of which 2,393 MW (79 percent) was derived from hydroelectric sources. Due to severe drought in the sub-region in recent months, the river levels are low and Zambian electricity output is low. As of February 2024, Zambia was grappling with a 500 MW deficit in electricity supply. This solar farm helps to partially mitigate that shortage.

== See also ==
- List of power stations in Zambia
- Zambia Riverside Solar Power Station
- ZESCO
