= Kalulushi Concentrated Solar Power Station =

Solar power station in Zambia

- Country: Zambia
- Location: Chambishi, Kalulushi District, Copperbelt Province
- Coordinates: 12°43′27″S 28°05′41″E
- Status: Proposed
- Construction began: 2022 Expected
- Commission date: 2024 Expected
- Owner: Kalulushi Solar Power Consortium
- Operator: Kalulushi Solar Power Limited

Solar farm
- Type: PV & Mirrors

Power generation
- Nameplate capacity: 200 MW (270,000 hp)

The Kalulushi Concentrated Solar Power Station, also Kalulushi CSP Station, is a proposed 200 MW (270,000 hp) concentrated solar power plant in Zambia. The power station is under development by three IPPs, Margam Valley Solar Energy Corporation, Afrisolar Power and EnergyLine Zambia. The power generated here will be integrated into the national grid through Zambia Electricity Supply Corporation Limited (ZESCO).

== Location ==
The power station would be located on a plot of land measuring 450 hectares (1,100 acres), off the Kitwe–Chingola Road, in Kalulushi District, in the Copperbelt Province of Zambia. This is about 30 kilometres (19 mi), by road, northwest of Kitwe, the nearest large city. The power station would be located approximately 92 kilometres (57 mi) northwest of the city of Ndola, the provincial capital.

== Overview ==
The power station is expected to employ new technology in generating electricity. Curved mirrors will concentrate the sun's rays to heat a thermal fluid. The fluids would then turn turbines to generate electricity. It is expected that the output from this power station will be sold to ZESCO for integration into the national grid.

== Developers ==
The table below illustrates the ownership of the special purpose vehicle company, which we will refer to as Kalulushi Solar Power Company, which will own and operate the power station.

Ownership of "Kalulushi Solar Power Company"
Rank	Shareholder	Domicile	Notes
1	Margam Valley Solar Energy Corporation	Zambia	
2	Afrisolar Power	Zambia	
3	EnergyLine Zambia	Zambia	

== Construction ==
In October 2021, the owner/developers of the renewable energy project awarded the engineering, procurement and construction contract to Sinohydro, the Chinese state-owned hydropower engineering and construction company.

== See also ==
- List of power stations in Zambia
- ZESCO
