= Chisamba Solar Power Plant =

100 MW solar power plant in Zambia

- Country: Zambia
- Location: Chisamba District, Central Province
- Coordinates: 14°36′36″S 28°35′24″E
- Status: Operational
- Construction began: July 2024
- Commission date: June 2025
- Construction cost: US$100 million
- Owner: KNBEPC (subsidiary of ZESCO)
- Operator: ZESCO

Solar farm
- Type: Standard PV

Power generation
- Nameplate capacity: 100 MW

The Chisamba Solar Power Plant is a 100 megawatt (MW) grid-connected photovoltaic (PV) solar power station in Chisamba District, Central Province, Zambia. It was commissioned in June 2025.

== Overview & Capacity ==
The plant was developed by the Kariba North Bank Extension Power Corporation, a subsidiary of ZESCO, and built by Power China International Group. Financing came from a mix of debt and equity: Stanbic Bank Zambia provided a loan of US$71.5 million, while ZESCO and KNBEPC each contributed US$30 million in equity. Total investment in the first phase was approximately US$100 million. The plant has an installed capacity of 100 MW and is estimated to supply enough electricity for 30,000 to 50,000 homes.

== Power purchase and usage ==
Electricity from the plant is sold under a 13-year power purchase agreement (PPA) with GreenCo Power Services, with the power supplied primarily to First Quantum Minerals (FQM), a copper mining company operating in Zambia. Under the arrangement, ZESCO redirects an equivalent amount of electricity to domestic consumers.

== Economic and social impact ==
Construction created over 1,200 jobs, of which approximately 98% were sourced locally. The plant is expected to employ around 100 people during operations. It is part of Zambia's plan to install 1,000 MW of solar capacity by 2025. A second 100 MW phase at the site is planned.

== See also ==
- Energy in Zambia
- List of power stations in Zambia
- Renewable energy in Africa
