= Kasanka National Park =

National Park in Zambia's Central Province

- IUCN category II (national park)
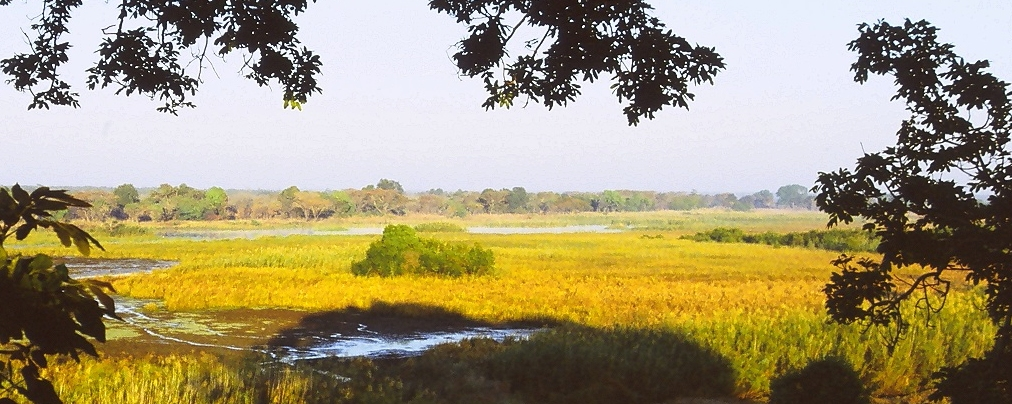

- Location within Zambia
- Location: Central Province, Zambia
- Nearest city: Serenje, Zambia
- Coordinates: 12°34′S 30°11′E
- Area: 390 km^{2} (150 sq mi)
- Governing body: Zambia Wildlife Authority

Kasanka National Park is a park located in the Chitambo District of Zambia’s Central Province. At roughly 390 km^{2} (150 mi^{2}), Kasanka is one of Zambia’s smallest national parks. Kasanka was the first of Zambia’s national parks to be managed by a private-public partnership. The privately funded Kasanka Trust Ltd has been in operation since 1986 and undertakes all management responsibilities, in partnership with the Department of National Parks and Wildlife (DNPW - previously ZAWA). The park has an average elevation between 1,160 m (3,810 ft) and 1,290 m (4,230 ft) above mean sea level. It has a number permanent shallow lakes and water bodies with the largest being Wasa. There are five perennial rivers in the park, with the largest being the Luwombwa River. The Luwombwa is the only river that drains the NP, which flows out in the northwestern corner. It is a tributary of the Luapula, which further upstream also drains the Bangweulu Swamp and forms the main source of the Congo River. Although Kasanka NP is part of the Greater Bangweulu Ecosystem, there is no direct hydrological connection between the park and the Bangweulu Wetlands.

A total of 114 mammal species have been recorded in the park including elephant, hippopotamus and sitatunga. A number of species have been reintroduced in the park by Kasanka Trust - the most successful of which are zebra and buffalo. Close to ten million straw-coloured fruit bats migrate to the Mushitu swamp evergreen forest in the park for three months during October to December, making it the largest mammal migration in the world. Over 471 bird species have been identified in the park. An airfield (ICAO: FLKA) lies there.

== Topography and vegetation ==
Kasanka has a varying altitude of 1,160 m (3,810 ft) and 1,290 m (4,230 ft) above mean sea level. The park is located in the Zambia in Serenje District of Zambia. While most sources quote the area of the park to be around 390 km^{2} (150 mi^{2}), others record the area close to 450 km^{2} (170 mi^{2}), making it one of the smaller national parks in the country. It has a relatively flat topography with few noteworthy relief features, with the exception of the Mambilima Falls located close to the Kasanka Conservation Centre and the rocky Mpululwe and Bwalya Bemba hills. Nine permanent lakes are found in the park and it is dissected by a network of rivers and streams. The larger rivers are the Luwombwa, Mulembo, Kasanka, Mulaushi and the swampy Musola River. The river streams and the lagoons have reed and papyrus beds. All of these rivers eventually shed their water via one another into the Luapula River, the only drainage outlet for the Bangweulu basin, and a major tributary of the Congo River.

== Habitats ==
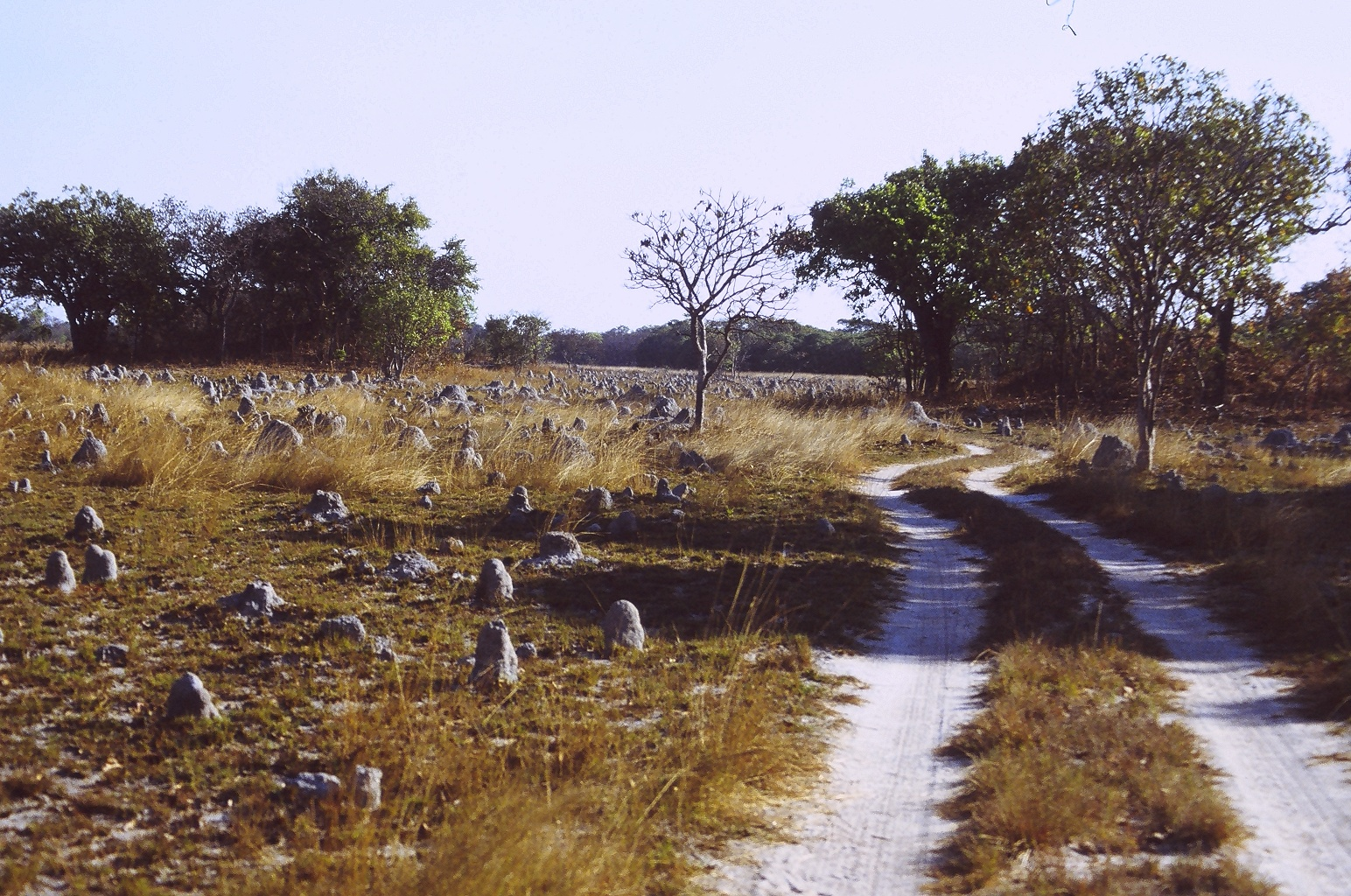
Termite mounds in the park

There are a variety of habitats in the park. Brachystegia woodland, otherwise known as Miombo Woodland, covers around 70% of Kasanka’s surface area, interspersed with grassy dambos. It is very rich in tree species and in many places forms a half closed canopy but also supports a well-developed herbaceous stratum. A high frequency of fires removes this stratum and young saplings and leads to Miombo Woodland with large, widely separated trees. Decades of “early burning” in the park have resulted in more natural Miombo with a strong presence of young trees and thicket species.

Evergreen forests of three kinds occur within Kasanka; Mushitu or swamp forest, riverine forests and very small patches of Mateshe (dry evergreen forest). The Mushitu is characterised by huge red mahoganies, waterberries and quinine trees among others and is fairly well represented. The largest tract of intact Mushitu, in the Fibwe area, hosts the annual gathering of straw-coloured fruit bats from October to December making it the largest fruit bat roost on Earth. Riverine forests are found along most rivers in Kasanka, with the largest stretches being found along the Luwombwa. True Mateshe probably was common in historic times but is rare now, as a result of centuries of frequent fires. All forest types are at risk from frequent wildfires as the tree species they support are not resistant to fire.

Chipya, also known as Lake Basin Woodland has interspersed trees and do not form a closed canopy. This allows sunlight that aids tall grasses to grow. Chipya is prone to very hot fires in the dry season, and this gives these woodlands their name as ‘chiya’ means ‘burnt’ in the local language. Chipya typically occurs on relatively soils and are thought to be a fire derivate form of Mateshe.

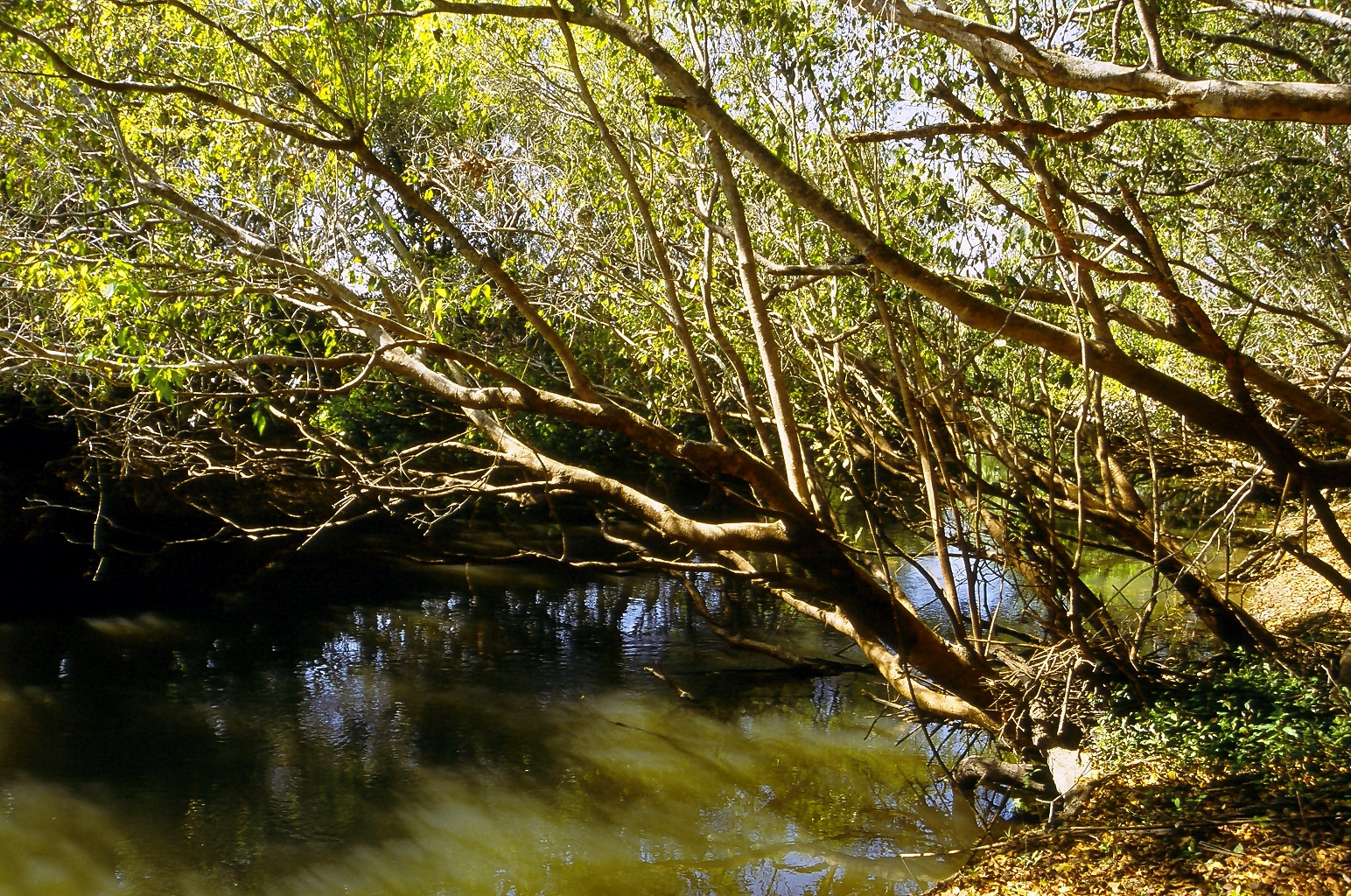
Wasa River in the park

Dambos are grassy drainage channels and basins with little to no woody vegetation but very palatable grasses. Most woody species grow on exposed termitaria as dambos tend to retain water very well. Dambos are of a vital importance to grazing mammal species as well as several woodland mammals that choose to graze on the fringes, especially during the dry season. Several large (several square km) grassy plains occur within the park such as Chinyangali close to Fibwe and the Chikufwe plain east of the Luwombwa River.

Papyrus swamps are considered the crown jewels of Kasanka with vast marshes supporting large tracts of thick papyrus swamp and home to the elusive sitatunga.

Kasanka has nine permanent lakes and over 100 km (62 mi) of rivers flowing through the park. Many of the rivers, especially the Luwombwa in the west support riparian fringe forests on their banks. Large areas of grassy floodplains are found along the Kasanka, Mulembo and Luwombwa rivers. The rivers and lakes are host to a variety of fish and are rich in other forms of aquatic and semi-aquatic wildlife.

== Fauna ==
=== Mammals ===
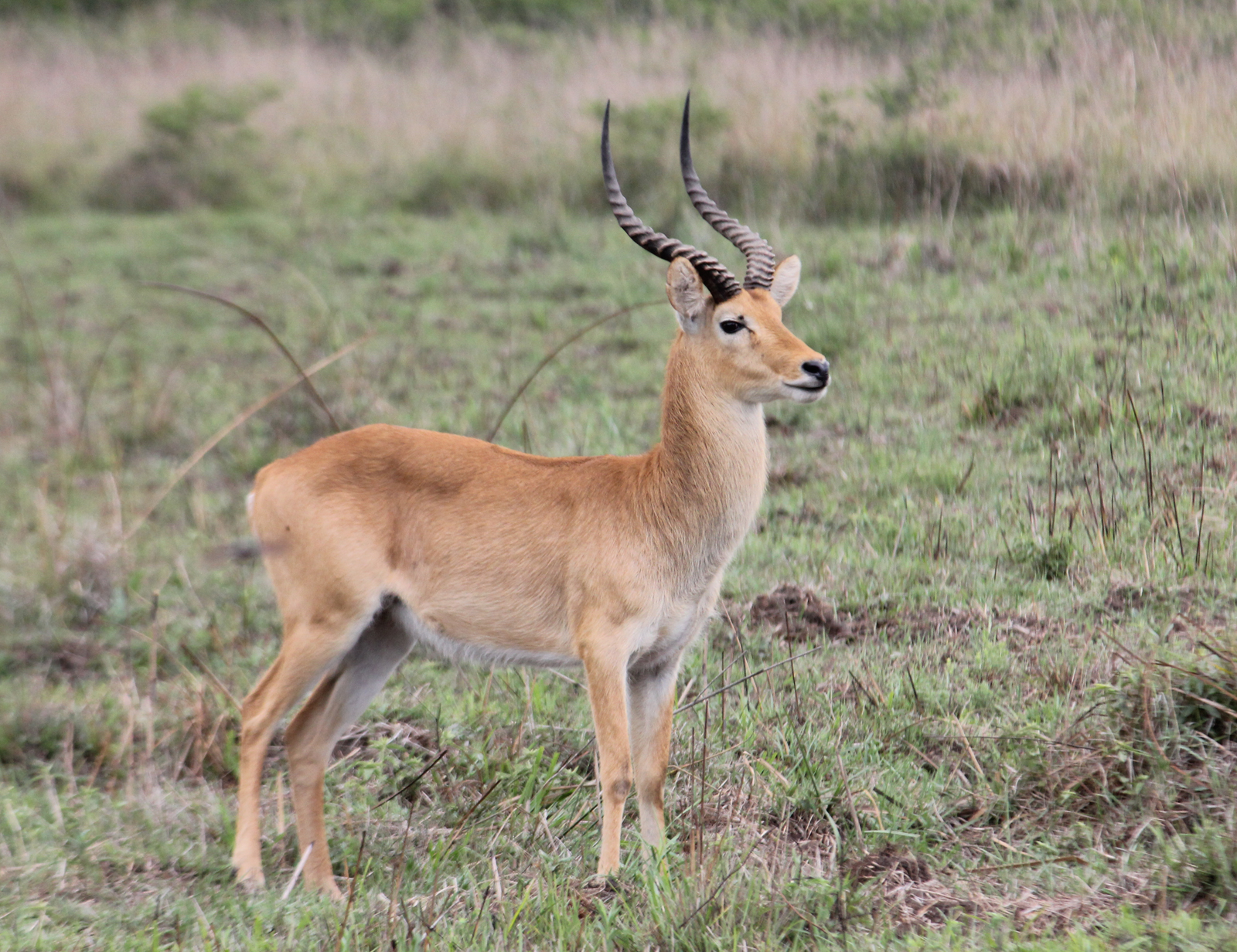
Puku antelope (Kobus vardonii) in the park

A total of 114 mammal species have been recorded in the park. Although severely depleted in the past, due to an ongoing anti-poaching presence, game populations in Kasanka have recovered. Puku are the most plentiful antelope and graze on the grassy floodplains and dambos throughout the Park. Common duiker, bushbuck, warthog, vervet monkey and Kinda baboon (related to the yellow baboon (Papio cynocephalus)) are common throughout the park and hippo can frequently be encountered in Kasanka’s rivers and lakes, including in Lake Wasa, opposite the main lodge. Kasanka is perhaps the best place in the world to spot the shy and reclusive sitatunga, of which the park holds an estimated 500-1,000 animals, and offers great opportunities for sightings of the rare blue monkey.

Elephant are faring increasingly well and several breeding herds and bachelor bulls traverse the park and the surrounding game management area. Several of the plains like Chikufwe are home to common reedbuck, buffalo, sable antelope and Lichtenstein's hartebeest, which are often encountered in the dry season. A small population of plains zebra occurs in the park. Roan antelope, defassa waterbuck and Sharpe's grysbok occur but are rare and seldom seen, whereas warthog numbers are increasing and they are commonly sighted. Yellow-backed duiker and Moloney’s monkey, which are poached elsewhere, have also got a steady increase in the population in the park.

The largest resident predator in the park is the leopard. Lions and hyenas are no longer resident but hyenas are seasonal visitors. Side-striped jackal are common and often spotted in the early mornings. A range of smaller carnivores occur, of which water mongoose, white-tailed mongoose, African civet and large spotted genet are commonly encountered at night and slender, banded and dwarf mongoose can often be seen crossing pathways during the day. Caracal, serval, honey badger and the rare Meller's mongoose occur but are very seldom sighted. Two species of otter live in Kasanka’s rivers, marshes and lakes.

=== Bats ===
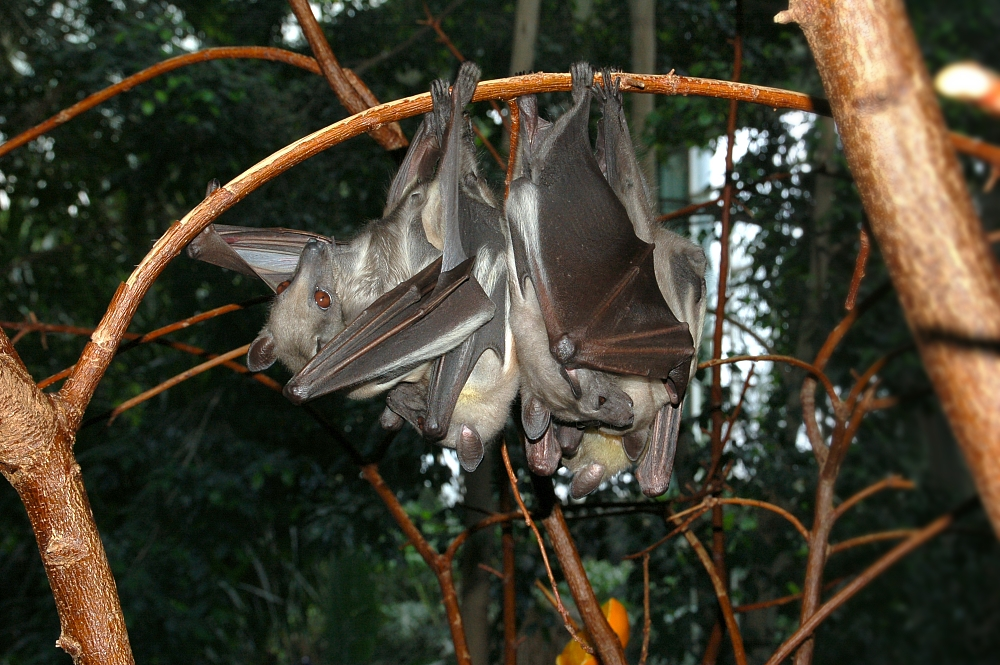
Straw-coloured fruit bats (Eidolon helvum) in captivity

The first of Kasanka’s famous straw-coloured fruit bats (Eidolon helvum) start arriving towards the middle of October each year. By mid-November the roost has reached its highest density and numbers are estimated to be around eight to ten million. It is believed to be the highest density of mammalian biomass on the planet, as well as the greatest known mammal migration. The arrival of the bats normally coincides with the start of the first rains and the ripening of many local fruit and berry species such as the masuku (wild loquat) and waterberry, on which the bats feed. It is estimated that 330,000 tonnes of fruits are consumed by the bats during the three months.

The bat roost is centred on one of the largest remaining patches of Mushitu (indigenous forest) in Kasanka along the Musola stream. There are a number of excellent 'hides' in trees at the edge of the forest which provide fantastic sightings of the bats in flight at dawn and dusk. The high concentration of bats attracts an incredible variety of predators and scavengers to the bat forest. Martial eagles, steppe eagles, common buzzards, African fish eagles, lesser spotted eagles, greater spotted eagles, African hawk-eagles, Ayres's hawk-eagles, black kites, palm-nut vultures, white-backed vultures, Amur falcons, and Eurasian hobby are amongst the raptors that concentrate on the roost for easy pickings.

The origin of the various colonies that make up this 'mega-colony' has never been fully established, however it is known that bats travel from other parts of Africa including Congo. Studies indicate that the abundance of fruits during the season are the major reason for the migration. The bats' arrival starts gradually during the first week of October, numbers peak in November and early December. Numbers start to decrease around the second week of December. The departure of the last bats has been getting later over recent years, with the final bats now generally leaving Kasanka in early January. A study published in the African Journal of Ecology indicated that the migratory impact of the bats could ultimately threaten the viability of the seasonal roost as it increases faster tree mortality. The Kasanka Trust undertakes an extensive fire management program to protect the forest from the devastating fires which over time have reduced the size of the forest. A 'Fire Exclusion Zone' has been established which over time will allow natural regeneration of the bats' forest in order to protect the unique phenomenon.

=== Birds ===
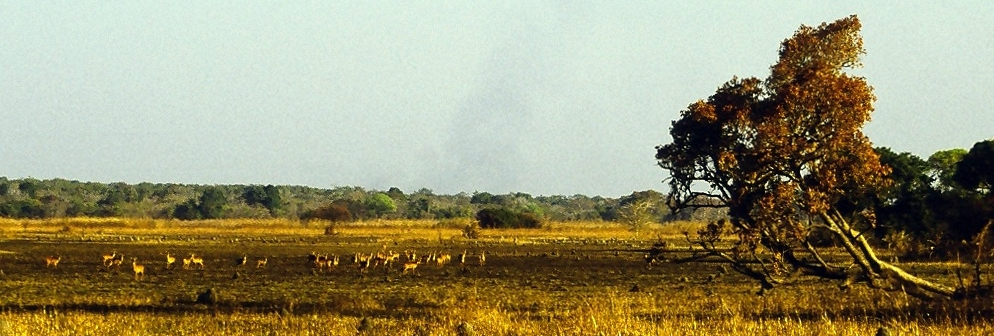
View of wildlife in the park

Kasanka holds undoubtedly some of the finest birding in Africa’ according to Dr Ian Sinclair, one of Africa’s leading ornithologists. With over 330 species recorded in this relatively small area without altitudinal variation, one will find it difficult to argue with this statement. Kasanka is blessed with a wide variety of habitats, each hosting its own community of bird species, many of which are rare or uncommon.

A boat-trip along the Luwomwba River, or any other major river in the park may reveal Pel’s fishing owl, African finfoot, half-collared kingfisher, Ross's turaco and Böhm's bee-eater. The vast wetlands of Kasanka support some species not easily seen elsewhere such as rufous-bellied heron, lesser jacana and African pygmy goose. The shoebill was confirmed for the first time in 20 years at the end of 2010 and a breeding pair of wattled cranes and their offspring are often encountered. Marsh tchagra, coppery-tailed coucal, Fulleborn's longclaw, locustfinch, pale-crowned, croaking and short-winged cisticola, chestnut-headed and streaky-breasted flufftail, harlequin and blue quail, black-rumped buttonquail and fawn-breasted waxbill are amongst the other specials on the wetland fringes and in the large dambos.

The Mushitu is host to a wide range of other species, the sought-after Narina trogon can often be heard and seen in the small patches of forest close to Pontoon and Fibwe. A range of other species occur such as blue-mantled crested flycatcher, Schalow's turaco, brown-headed apalis, black-backed barbet, grey waxbill, Bocage's robin, West African (olive) thrush, dark-backed weaver, red-throated twinspot, green twinspot, red-backed mannikin, green-headed sunbird, yellow-rumped tinkerbird, scaly-throated honeyguide, pallid honeyguide, purple-throated cuckooshrike, black-throated wattle-eye, yellow-throated leaflove and little, grey-olive, yellow-bellied and Cabanis's greenbul.

However, perhaps the richest birding areas of Kasanka are the extensive tracts of miombo woodland. A variety of specialist species occur here, many of which are not found outside the sub-region, these include black-collared and green-capped eremomelas, racket-tailed roller, rufous-bellied and Miombo grey tits, grey penduline tit, woodland and bushveld pipit, spotted creeper, white-tailed blue flycatcher, Böhm's flycatcher, yellow-bellied hyliota, red-capped crombec, Cabanis's bunting, Reichar's and black-eared seedeater, miombo scrub robin, miombo rock thrush, thick-billed cuckoo, Anchieta's sunbird, and Anchieta's, Whyte's and Miombo pied barbets.

=== Other wildlife ===
In addition to the large and more visible game and wildlife, Kasanka is home to an incredible variety of insects and other arthropods. The many rivers and marshes are home to a wide range of reed frogs and other amphibians. Large crocodiles dwell in the rivers and huge specimens can be seen along the Kasanka and Luwombwa Rivers. Large Nile monitors occur as well, as do Speke's hinged tortoise. Common snake species include Southern African rock python, forest cobra, lined olympic snake, olive marsh snake and herald snake. Three geckos, one agama, five skinks, one worm-lizard and two lizard species are known to occur as well.

== Administration and management ==
Zambia's wildlife management is considered one of best managed and administered among all countries in Africa. The management faces ever increasing challenges from a rapidly increasing human population in the country. This manifest in the form of increasing poaching and illegal harvesting from national parks, encroachment, and deforestation due to charcoal production and farming activities. During the 1980s, the Zambian administration faced a shortage of trained staff, transport and patrols, leading the government to seek the support of NGOs and private bodies. After visiting the neglected and completely undeveloped Kasanka National Park for the first time in 1985 and hearing gunshots, the late David Lloyd, a British colonial officer, impressed with the wide range of habitats and amazing scenery, concluded that if there was still poaching, there must still be wildlife. He made it his life's mission to develop the park and safeguard the biodiversity of Kasanka.

In 1987 the Kasanka Trust (KTL) was founded as a non-profit charitable institution with tax-exemption within Zambia. It has since become a registered charity in the United Kingdom and the Netherlands. The Kasanka Trust has a Memorandum of Understanding with the Department of National Parks and Wildlife (previously ZAWA - Zambian Wildlife Authority) and under this agreement is responsible for infrastructure and habitat management, community outreach and tourism. It became the first national park to be managed by a private body. DNPW retains the responsibilities for anti-poaching work in the park and surrounding Game Management Area in conjunction with the Trust. The Kasanka Trust aims to cover its costs through tourism-generated revenue, however it is still reliant on external funding from grants and donations for part of its budget.

Since KTL's involvement at Kasanka significant progress has been made, a vast network of roads has been created as well as an excellent tourist-infrastructure, a community conservation centre and the implementation of effective anti-poaching measures. The Trust employs about 60 local staff and has an ongoing community outreach program within the surrounding communities including amongst other things; sponsorship of secondary school students, promotion of conservation farming techniques, a human/elephant conflict program and promotion of the conservation message to local villages. In 2011 Kasanka Trust began operations in the undeveloped and depleted 1,600 km^{2} Lavushi Manda National Park with assistance from the World Bank.

== Bibliography ==
- East, Rod (1999). African Antelope Database 1998 - Volume 21 of Iucn/Ssc Action Plans for the Conservation of Biological Div Issue 21 of Occasional papers of the IUCN Species Survival Commission. IUCN. ISBN 9782831704777.
- East, Rod (1989). Antelopes: Southern and South Central Africa - Part 2 of Antelopes: Global Survey and Regional Action Plans, Rod East IUCN/SSC action plans for the conservation of biological diversity. IUCN. ISBN 9782880329709.
