= Livingstone Memorial =

Monument in the Bangweulu Swamps, Zambia

Coordinates: 12°18′00″S 30°17′28″E

The Livingstone Memorial, built in 1899, marks the spot where missionary explorer David Livingstone died on 1 May 1873, in Chief Chitambo's village at Chipundu (today in Chitambo District), near the edge of the Bangweulu Swamps in Zambia. His body was embalmed and his heart was buried there under a mpundu tree by his followers, now led by his loyal attendants Chuma and Susi, who then departed for the coast carrying his body. In their party was an Indian-educated African man named Jacob Wainwright who carved the inscription "LIVINGSTONE MAY 4 1873" and the names of the attendants on the tree.

== The fate of the memorial tree ==
By 1899, Chitambo's village had dispersed to another site after the death of the chief, and the tree was decaying. It was cut down by Robert Codrington who had been sent by the British Commissioner Alfred Sharpe to prepare the way for a permanent memorial. He made a clearing in the forest and had the carving removed and sent to the Royal Geographical Society's museum in London.

== Construction of the memorial ==
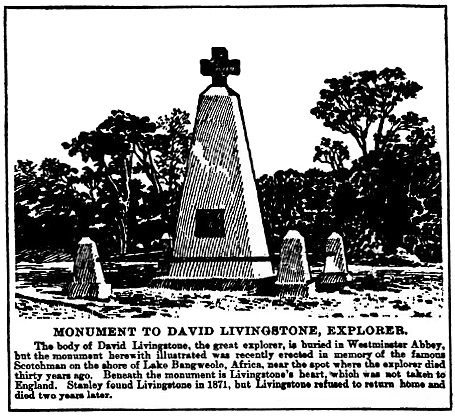
Representation of the monument, published in 1903 in an American newspaper.

The memorial was constructed in 1902 by Owen Stroud and some African artisans who travelled from Fort Jameson (now Chipata) to do the job. The site was still marked by the clearing made by Codrington. Stroud built an obelisk around 6 m high from burnt brick plastered with smooth cement and attached to it two brass plaques sent from London. (These were replaced around 1935 by spare copies and in the 1950s by bronze replicas.) Four brick and wooden posts with iron and wooden rails were set up around the base and were replaced in the early 1950s by iron chains. When the top of the obelisk was damaged, the repairs included a bronze cross placed on top of it.

== Location of the memorial ==
The Memorial is reached from the tarred Serenje-Samfya highway via a turn-off to the north, which is 10 km northeast from the turn-off south to Kasanka National Park. A gravel road of about 30 km reaches the memorial in woodland. David Livingstone did not die "on the shores of Lake Bangweulu", as stated in some publications, but 100 km south-east of the lake, near the edge of the floodplain which borders the Bangweulu Swamps. The area was not in Barotseland as stated in other sources. Livingstone had been trying to discover the rivers flowing in and out of the swamps, but he did so at the end of the rainy season when the annual flood carried his party's boats at his crib across the floodplain to the Lulimala River. The memorial is 5 km south of the Lulimala, 10 km south of the edge of the floodplain, and 40 km from the edge of the permanent swamps.

There is a visitors' book in the nearby village health centre.

== Additions ==
There are now four bronze plaques on the monument, and the most recent of which was added in 1973 reads: "After 100 years David Livingstone's spirit and the love of God so animated his friends of all races that they gathered here in thanksgiving on 1st May 1973 led by Dr Kenneth David Kaunda President of the Republic of Zambia."
