= Kamfinsa (constituency) =

Constituency of the National Assembly of Zambia

Kamfinsa is a constituency of the National Assembly of Zambia. It covers part of the south-east of Kitwe in Kitwe District of Copperbelt Province, together with a rural area that includes the town of Mwekera.

== List of MPs ==
Election year	MP	Party
1991	Lemmy Chipili	Movement for Multi-Party Democracy
1996	Webster Chipili	Movement for Multi-Party Democracy
2001	Webster Chipili	Movement for Multi-Party Democracy
2006	Michael Nyirenda	Patriotic Front
2011	Moses Chishimba	Patriotic Front
2016	Elalio Musonda	Patriotic Front
2021	Christopher Kang'ombe	Patriotic Front
2026	Kelvin Chipili	National Reconciliation Party for Unity and Prosperity
