= Kafue Gorge Lower Power Station =

Zambian power station

- Map of Zambia showing the location of Kafue Gorge Lower Power Station.
- Country: Zambia
- Location: Kafue Gorge, Chikankata District
- Coordinates: 15°53′46″S 28°33′33″E
- Purpose: Power
- Status: Operational
- Opening date: 2023
- Construction cost: US$2 Billion
- Owner: Government of Zambia
- Operator: ZESCO

Dam and spillways
- Impounds: Kafue River
- Height: 140 m (460 ft)
- Length: 378 m (1,240 ft)

Power Station
- Turbines: 5 x 150 MW
- Installed capacity: 750 megawatts (1,010,000 hp)

Kafue Gorge Lower Power Station (KGL), is a 750 megawatts (1,010,000 hp) hydroelectric power station in Zambia.

== Background ==
As of 2017, according to USAID, Zambia had installed generating capacity of 2,800 megawatts. Of these, 2,380 megawatts (85 percent) was hydroelectricity. Peak electricity demand in Zambia has been recorded at 1,960 megawatts, with growth in electricity demand estimated at between 150 MW and 200 MW every year. Approximately 70 percent of national electricity output is consumed by the country's mines in the Copperbelt Province.

In October 2015, after the requisite feasibility and environmental studies, the engineering, procurement and construction contract was awarded to Sinohydro, a Chinese, state-owned hydropower engineering and construction company. The contract price is reported as US$2 billion, with 85 percent borrowed from the Exim Bank of China, and the Industrial and Commercial Bank of China. The government of Zambia was to invest the remaining 15 percent in the project.

== Location ==
The power station is located along the Kafue River, between the Kafue Gorge Upper Power Station upstream and the confluence of the Kafue River with the Zambezi River downstream. The power station is located approximately 90 kilometres (56 mi), by road, south of Lusaka, Zambia's capital city. The geographical coordinates of Kafue Gorge Lower Power Station are:15°53'46.0"S, 28°33'33.0"E (Latitude:-15.896111; Longitude:28.559167).

== Construction ==
Construction of the power station began in November 2015. As of July 2019, the contractor expected to conclude during the fourth quarter of 2020. During construction, over 3,000 jobs were created. In September 2019, construction of the dam and power station were halted due to financial difficulties.

In July 2021, one of the five turbines (Turbine Number 2) was commercially commissioned to supply 150 megawatts to the Zambian national grid.

In March 2023, last of the five turbines was started. President Hakainde Hichilema officially commissioned the power station. Throughout its construction, the project has created 15,000 local jobs and has significantly contributed to the growth of the local construction, trade, and transportation sectors. Additionally, it has spurred the development of infrastructure surrounding the hydropower station. After construction, the hydropower plant will boost Zambia's power capacity by nearly 38%.

== Funding ==
The below table summarizes the funding sources for the power station alone, without the related power line, road and other infrastructure.

Sources of Funding for Isimba Hydroelectric Power Station
Rank	Name of Development Partner	Funding in USD (Millions)	Percentage
1	Exim Bank of China and Industrial and Commercial Bank of China	1,700	85.0
2	Government of Zambia	300	15.0
	Total	2,000	100.00

== Operations ==
The power generated will be evacuated via a 330-kilovolt transmission line, measuring approximately 100 kilometres (62 mi) to Lusaka, for integration into the national power grid.

== See also ==
- List of power stations in Zambia
