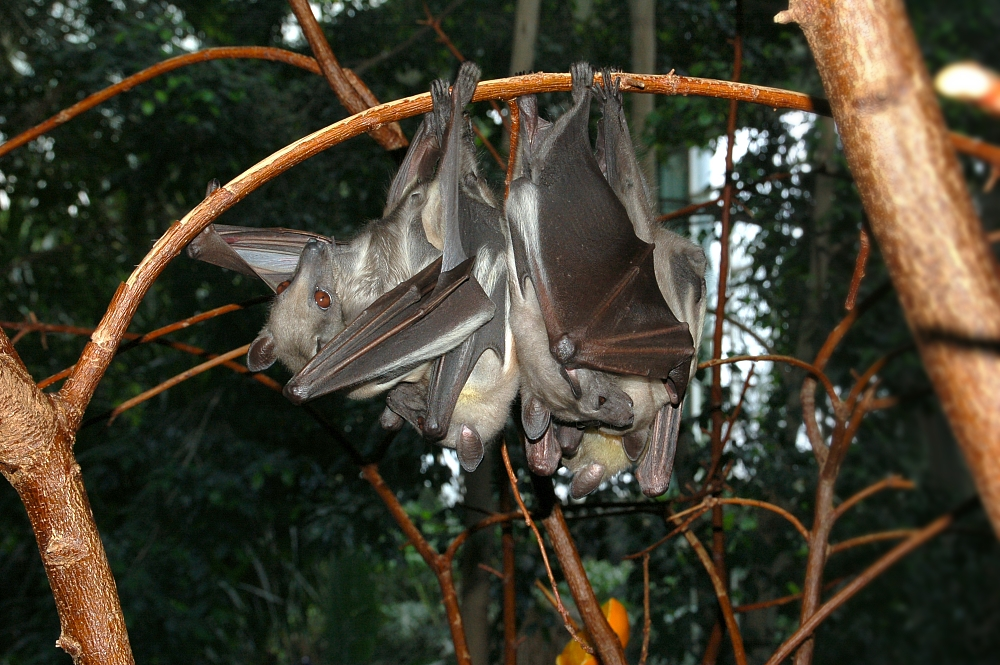

Conservation status
- Near Threatened (IUCN 3.1)

Scientific classification
- Kingdom: Animalia
- Phylum: Chordata
- Class: Mammalia
- Order: Chiroptera
- Family: Pteropodidae
- Genus: Eidolon
- Species: E. helvum

Binomial name
- Eidolon helvum Kerr, 1792
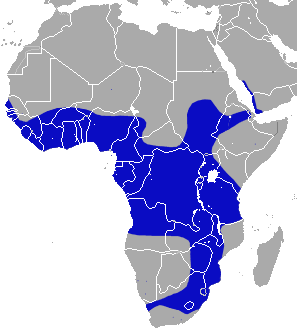
- Straw-coloured fruit bat range

= Straw-coloured fruit bat =

Species of mammal

The straw-coloured fruit bat (Eidolon helvum) is a large fruit bat that is the most widely distributed of all the African megabats. It is quite common throughout its area ranging from the southwestern Arabian Peninsula, across forest and savanna zones of sub-Saharan Africa. It is listed as Near Threatened on the IUCN Red List due to a decreasing population trend. Straw-coloured fruit bats travel in massive colonies of at least 100,000 bats and sometimes massing up to 1 million. From October to end of December every year, in the largest migration of mammals on the planet, up to 10 million straw-coloured fruit bats congregate in Kasanka National Park, Zambia, roosting in a 2 hectares (4.9 acres) area of Mushitu forest each day. This migration was only discovered in 1980. Their necks and backs are a yellowish-brown colour, while their undersides are tawny olive or brownish.

== Description ==
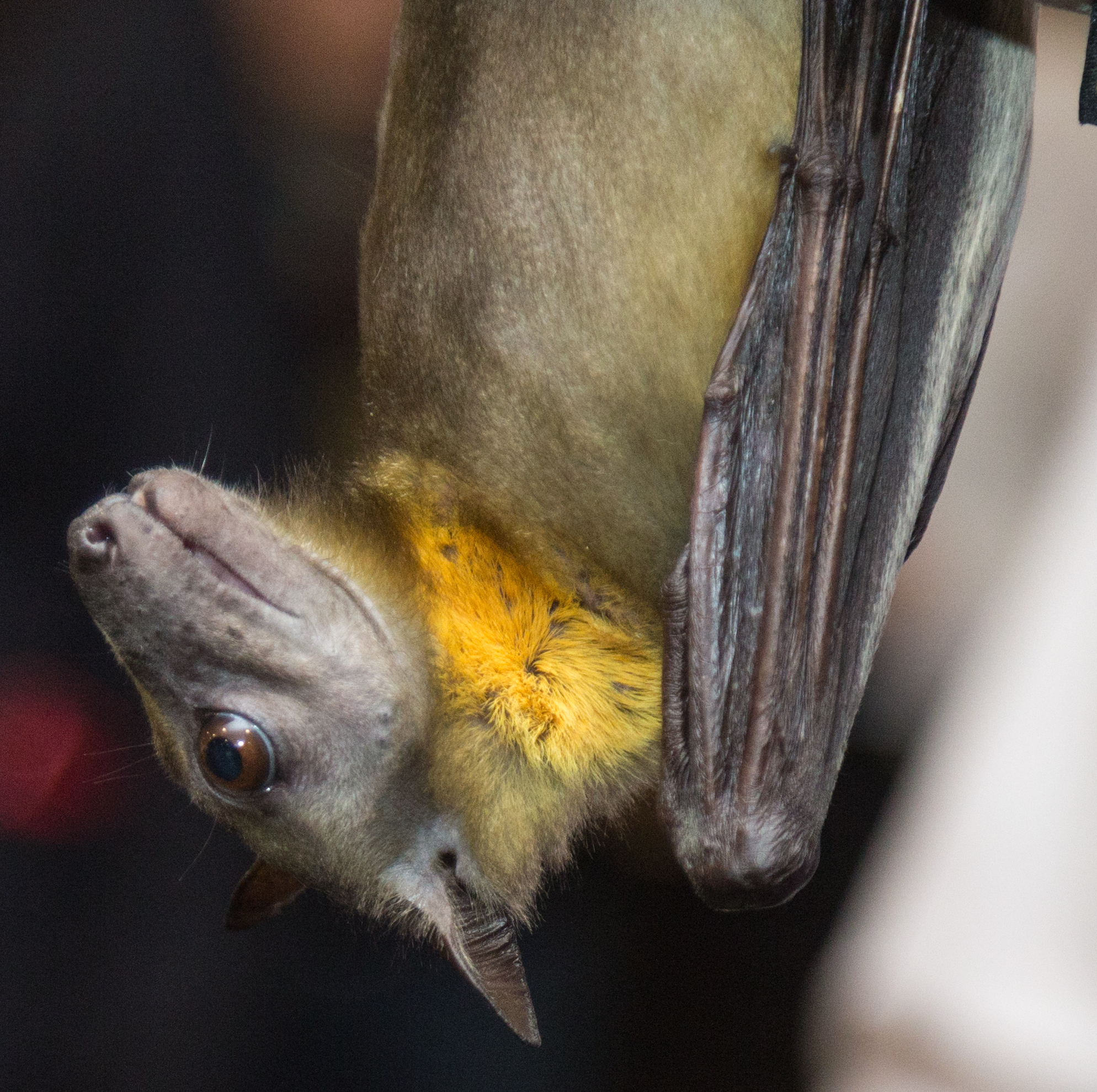
The straw-colored fruit bat was named based on its yellowish fur

The straw-coloured fruit bat is named for the silky yellowish or straw colour of its fur. The wings are black, and the back hair is pale and tawny. Males are generally bright orange and females are usually yellowish. The bats have large cheeks, eyes, and ears. The average weight of these bats ranges from 8 to 12 oz (230 to 340 g) and the animals grow to 5.7 to 9 in (14 to 23 cm) in length, with wings spanning up to 30 in (76 cm). Males are generally larger than females. The bat's heart is very large, and its wings are long and tapered at the tip. The cheeks of the bat are also large and pouch-like.

== Behaviour and ecology ==
The straw-coloured fruit bat is a highly social species. The bats tend to live in groups of over 100,000 and at times that number may increase to almost one million. At night the bats leave the roost in smaller groups to find food by sight and smell. They have also been seen chewing on soft wood for moisture. These bats can also pollinate flowers and disperse seeds through the forests. They are the main agents of seed dispersal for the increasingly rare and economically significant African teak tree Milicia excelsa.

Although they feed at night, straw-coloured fruit bats are not necessarily nocturnal. During the day, they will be found resting and moving among the colony. Year to year, season to season, the bats will return to the same place where they found food the previous year or season.

The mating season of straw-coloured fruit bats is from April to June and is not synchronized among the bats. Implantation is delayed until October and is synchronized with all females implanting during this time. The delay corresponds one of two dry periods in the home range of the bats. Birth occurs in February and March.

=== Diet ===
The diets of straw-coloured fruit bats vary depending on whether or not they are living in captivity. Wild bats usually eat bark, flowers, leaves, nectar, and fruits. In captivity, they are fed various mixes, including apples, oranges, bananas, grapes, and cantaloupe. In some zoos, they are also fed a marmoset diet.

== Distribution and habitat ==
The straw-coloured fruit bat is the most widely distributed fruit bat in Africa, and perhaps the world. This species is distributed mainly in Africa from Senegal to Ethiopia, down to South Africa, mostly among the sub-Saharan climates, in many forest and savanna zones, and around the southwestern Arabian peninsula. It can also be found in urban areas and at altitudes up to 2,000 m (6,600 ft). It prefers tall trees for roosting.

== Threats ==
The straw-coloured fruit bat is hunted as bushmeat in West and Central Africa.

In 2011, it was estimated that about 128,400 straw-coloured fruit bats are traded as bushmeat every year in four cities in southern Ghana.
