= Mbabala (constituency) =

Constituency of the National Assembly of Zambia

Mbabala is a constituency of the National Assembly of Zambia. It covers the northern part of Choma District in Southern Province.

== List of MPs ==
Election year	MP	Party
Mbabala
1968	Edward Nyanga	Zambian African National Congress
1973	Edward Nyanga	United National Independence Party
1978	Edward Nyanga	United National Independence Party
1983	Maurice Katowa	United National Independence Party
1988	Maurice Katowa	United National Independence Party
1991	Alfeyo Hambayi	Movement for Multi-Party Democracy
1996	Alfeyo Hambayi	Movement for Multi-Party Democracy
2000 (by-election)	Emmanuel Hachipuka	United Party for National Development
2001	Emmanuel Hachipuka	United Party for National Development
2006	Emmanuel Hachipuka	United Party for National Development
2011	Ephraim Belemu	United Party for National Development
2016	Ephraim Belemu	United Party for National Development
2021	Joseph Musanje	United Party for National Development
2026	Joseph Musanje	United Party for National Development

== Geography ==
Mbabala constituency is located in the northern part of Choma District, Southern Province, Zambia. The constituency is bordered by Choma Central constituency to the south. The district capital, Choma, serves as the provincial capital of Southern Province. The constituency comprises 12 wards.

=== 2026 delimitation ===
In February 2026, the Electoral Commission of Zambia (ECZ) conducted district delimitation sittings across all 116 districts of Zambia, arising from the Constitution of Zambia (Amendment) Act No. 13 of 2025, which increased constituency-based seats in the National Assembly from 156 to 226.

During the Choma District delimitation sitting held at St. Mawaggali Trades Training Institute, various stakeholders and representatives of traditional chiefs considered three proposed models for constituency boundaries. Model A proposed the division of both Choma Central and Mbabala constituencies, while Models B and C proposed the division of Choma Central only. Stakeholders ultimately adopted Model B, which proposed the creation of a new Choma South Constituency comprising 8 wards, thereby dividing Choma Central and leaving Mbabala constituency intact.
