= Agua Imara AS =

Norwegian renewable energy company

- Company type: Private
- Industry: Power
- Headquarters: Oslo, Norway
- Area served: Norway
- Key people: Kristian Haneberg (CEO); Øystein Øyehaug (Chair)
- Products: Hydroelectricity and windpower
- Parent: Norfund

Agua Imara AS, formerly SN Power AfriCA, is a subsidiary of Norfund (Norfund). It is a Norwegian renewable energy company with focus on emerging markets. The core markets for Agua Imara are Africa (primarily markets within the Southern African Power Pool) and Central America, (primarily in Panama, Costa Rica and Nicaragua) where the objective is to act as a long-term industrial investor, developer and operator of hydro- and wind-power projects.

The company was founded in January 2009 by SN Power (51%), Norfund (10%), and two Norwegian renewable energy entities: TrønderEnergi (12.66%) and BKK (26.34%), and is today a 100% subsidiary of Norfund

The headquarter is located in Oslo, with all investments carried out and followed up from Agua Imara ACA Pte Ltd in the Netherlands, which in turn has regional branch offices in Panama City, Panama and Lusaka, Zambia. Panama was the first market to be entered through the Bajo Frio hydropower project, a 58 MW run-off river scheme, which was completed in 2015. Agua Imara owns 50.1%. In May 2011, the company signed an acquisition agreement for a 51% shareholding in Lunsemfwa Hydro Power Company Ltd (LHPC) located in Zambia, operating two hydropower plants with a combined capacity of 56MW

Agua Imara's overall business mission is to become a leading renewable energy company in its core markets, and thus contribute to economic growth and sustainable development as well as short and long term profitability. This growth is envisioned through the acquisition of existing assets and construction of renewable energy projects, primarily hydropower.
