= Serenje (constituency) =

Constituency of the National Assembly of Zambia

Serenje is a constituency of the National Assembly of Zambia. It covers Chisenga, Mapepela, Serenje and Wingie in Serenje District of Central Province.

== List of MPs ==
Election year	MP	Party
1964	Mateo Kakumbi	United National Independence Party
1964 (by-election)	Miselo Kapika	United National Independence Party
1968	Kamfwa Jonasi	United National Independence Party
1973	Rajah Kunda	United National Independence Party
1978	Rajah Kunda	United National Independence Party
1983	Rajah Kunda	United National Independence Party
1988	Musonda Chunga	United National Independence Party
1991	Abdul Hamir	Movement for Multi-Party Democracy
1996	Abdul Hamir	Movement for Multi-Party Democracy
2001	Ackimson Banda	Movement for Multi-Party Democracy
2006	Ackimson Banda	Movement for Multi-Party Democracy
2011	Philip Kosamu	Patriotic Front
2016	Maxwell Kabanda	Movement for Multi-Party Democracy
2021	George Kasabila Kandafula	Independent
2026	Friday Katombi	United Party for National Development
