= Kitwe Public Library =

Public library in Kitwe, Zambia

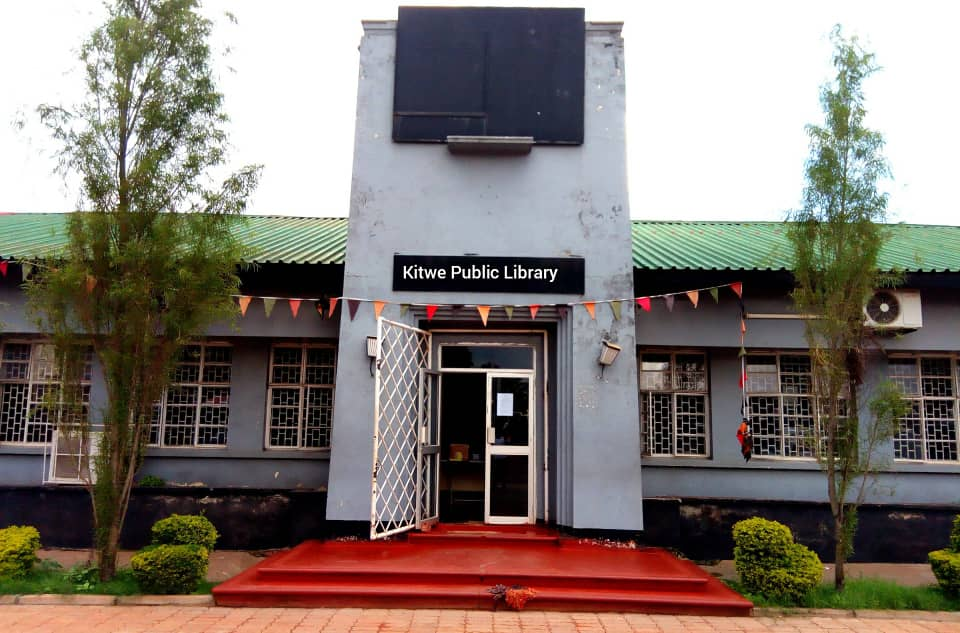
- Entrance to the Kitwe Public Library
- 12.820599148939568°S 28.212770801247427°E
- Location: Kaunda Square, Kitwe, Zambia
- Established: 1960s
- Branches: 2

Collection
- Size: 20,000

Kitwe Public Library (KPL) is a Zambian public library located in Kitwe. Administratively, it is run under the Department of Housing and Social Services of the Kitwe City Council. It also has a second branch situated in Buchi Township, which is also part of Kitwe District.

The library serves the general population of Kitwe with information and reference support. The Buchi Township branch also serves the learning population in the areas of Buseko, Kawama, Kamitondo and various institutions like the Copperbelt University and Kitwe School of Nursing.

== Background ==
The building in which it is housed was built in 1954 though library operations started in the 1960s. Initially a whites-only library, it was opened to the general public after Zambia's independence in 1964.

== Collection and partnerships ==
Both libraries stock books and other reading materials in addition to hosting social events.

In 2018, the library was one of the beneficiaries of the Worldreader project in which it received a number of e-readers with a number of titles in both English and local languages to aid literacy for its young readers

Through Books for Africa, the library has also received donations to its collection facilitated by Buchi-Kamitondo Childhood Association (BUKACA) to stock its Buchi branch.

== See also ==
- Kitwe
