= Bangweulu Solar Power Station =

Solar farm in Zambia

- Bangweulu Solar Power Station
- Country: Zambia
- Location: Kafue District, Lusaka Province
- Coordinates: 15°30′42″S 28°25′54″E
- Status: Operational
- Commission date: 11 March 2019
- Construction cost: US$60 million
- Owner: Bangweulu Power Company Limited
- Operator: Bangweulu Power Company Limited

Solar farm
- Type: Standard PV

Thermal power station
- Primary fuel: Solar

Power generation
- Nameplate capacity: 54 MW (72,000 hp)

Bangweulu Solar Power Station (BSPS), is a 54 MW (72,000 hp) solar power plant in Zambia. The solar farm that was commercially commissioned in March 2019, was developed and is owned by a consortium comprising Neoen, a French IPP, Industrial Development Corporation of Zambia (IDC Zambia), a government parastatal company and First Solar, a US-based solar panel manufacturer. The power station cost US$60 million to develop.

== Location ==
The power plant is located in the Lusaka South Multi-Facility Economic Zone, in Kafue District, in Lusaka Province, approximately 25 kilometres (16 mi), by road, southeast of the central business district of Lusaka, the capital of Zambia and the largest city in that country. BSPS its on 52 hectares (130 acres) of real estate. The geographical coordinates of Bangweulu Solar Power Station are 15°30'42.0"S, 28°25'54.0"E (Latitude:-15.511667; Longitude:28.431667), just north of the Ngonye Solar Power Station.

== Overview ==
The Government of Zambia, through IDC Zambia, working with the World Bank Group, as part of the bank's program "Scaling Solar", awarded the tender to develop this power station to Neoen, a French independent power producer. The American solar panel manufacturer First Solar Inc. was selected to manufacture and supply the solar panels for the power station.

The power generated here is purchased by Zambia Electricity Supply Corporation Limited (ZESCO) under a 25-year power purchase agreement executed between ZESCO and Neoen at US$0.0602 per kWh.

== Ownership ==
This power station is owned by a consortium whose members are illustrated in the table below. The members of the consortium formed a special purpose vehicle company Bangweulu Power Company Limited, which operates and maintains the power station.

Bangweulu Power Company Limited Ownership
Rank	Shareholder	Domicile	Notes
1	Neoen	France	
2	First Solar	United States	
3	IDC Zambia	Zambia	

== Funding, construction and timeline ==
This renewable energy infrastructure development project received a grant of US$2 million, from the United States Agency for International Development (USAID).

The International Finance Corporation (IFC), and the Overseas Private Investment Corporation (formerly OPIC, now DFC), jointly lent US$39 million to the consortium of owner/developers of BSPS.

The EPC contract was awarded to Sterling & Wilson, an engineering and Construction company, based in India. Construction started in December 2017, with commercial commissioning taking place in March 2019.

== See also ==
- List of power stations in Zambia
- Ngonye Solar Power Station
