= Sioma =

- Town
- Location of Sioma in Zambia
- Coordinates: 16°36′20″S 23°30′19″E
- Country: Zambia
- Province: Western
- District: Sioma
- Time zone: UTC+2 (CAT)

Sioma is a town on the west bank of the Zambezi River in the Western Province of Zambia. Since 2012 it has been the capital of the Sioma District.

== Geography ==
Sioma is located on the west bank of the Zambezi River 130 kilometres (81 mi) north of Sesheke and 150 kilometres (93 mi) south of the provincial capital Mongu. The town is situated approximately 60 kilometres (37 mi) south of the town of Senanga which marks the southern extent of the Barotse Floodplain.

Vegetation in the area is predominantly Dry Kalahari woodland.

=== Weather ===
Annually, the town gets an average of 737 millimetres (29.0 in) of rain.

Climate data for Sioma, Zambia
Month	Jan	Feb	Mar	Apr	May	Jun	Jul	Aug	Sep	Oct	Nov	Dec	Year
Mean daily maximum °C	22	20	23	25	23	22	21	25	27	28	27	24	24
Mean daily minimum °C	15	16	15	13	11	9	7	10	13	15	15	14	13
Average precipitation mm	165	147	90	21	0	0	0	0	0	15	30	162	630
Mean daily maximum °F	72	68	73	77	73	72	70	77	81	82	81	75	75
Mean daily minimum °F	59	61	59	55	52	48	45	50	55	59	59	57	55
Average precipitation inches	6.5	5.8	3.5	0.8	0	0	0	0	0	0.6	1.2	6.4	24.8
Average precipitation days	19	16	16	7	1	0	0	1	1	6	9	18	94

== History ==
An Early Iron Age site was excavated at Sioma which has been dated to the mid centuries of the first millennium. Some of the pottery at the site resembles that which is found in Nqoma, Angola.

In the 1880s the Portuguese explorer Alexandre Alberto da Rocha de Serpa Pinto and American James Dabney McCabe both described the settlement as a hamlet. Pinto also described how the Lui government forced local residents to act as porters for canoes attempting to get around the nearby Ngonye Falls.

Expansion of the town started in 1957 when the catholic Irish Capuchin Franciscans established the Saint Anthony mission station on the Zambezi river at the town.

In 2012 the town was made the capital of the newly created Sioma District.
