= Copperbelt Energy Corporation =

Copperbelt Energy Corporation Plc
- Company type: Public Limited Company
- Traded as: Lusaka Stock Exchange:CECZ
- Industry: Electricity Generation, Transmission and Supply
- Founded: 1997
- Headquarters: Kitwe, Zambia
- Revenue: ▲ZMW 7,720 million | US$ 382 million (2023)
- Operating income: ▲ZMW 4,689 million | US$ 232 million (2023)
- Total assets: ▲ZMW 13,654 million | US$ 676 million (2023)
- Total equity: ▲ZMW 2,782 million | US$ 138 million (2023)
- Number of employees: 400 in Zambia (2023), 3,165 in Nigeria (2014)
- Website: cecinvestor.com

Copperbelt Energy Corporation Plc (CEC) is a Zambian electricity generation, transmission, distribution and supply company with operations in Zambia and Nigeria. The company is listed on the Lusaka Stock Exchange (symbol: CECZ)

== Operations ==
=== Zambia ===
In Zambia CEC owns and operates an electricity transmission network in the Copperbelt area with 246 km of 220kV power lines and 678 km of 66kV lines. The company purchases electricity from ZESCO, the national power utility, and sells this across its transmission network to 8 Zambian mining customers with a combined demand of 520MW. In 2014 CEC supplied 4,208GWh of electricity to its customers which was 29% of Zambia's total generation of 14,453GWh. CEC also operates 6 gas turbine generators at Luano, Maclaren, Kankoyo and Bancroft for emergency power supply to its mine customers with a total installed capacity of 80MW.

CEC owns the Zambian portion of the Zambia - DRC 220kV interconnector line which has a capacity of 250MW and supplies electricity to mining customers in the Katanga Province. The interconnector is expected to be upgraded to a dual circuit with a capacity of 550MW by the end of 2015.

The company is developing the 40MW Kabompo Gorge hydropower project on the Kabompo river in the North-Western Province of Zambia.

CEC is a member of the Southern African Power Pool (SAPP) and trades and wheels power within the pool.

In 2023, CEC commissioned the Zambia Riverside Solar Power Station, a 34 MW Solar Power Plant in Riverside, Kitwe.

In February 2024 CEC reported it was developing the Itimpi Solar Power Station, a 60 MW solar plant under development in Itimpi area, Kitwe.

=== Nigeria ===
In Nigeria CEC owned 45 percent of the Abuja Electricity Distribution Company (AEDC) an electric power distribution company. AEDC has a franchise for distributing electricity in four Nigerian states, the Federal Capital Territory of Abuja, Niger State, Kogi State and Nasarawa State and serves 700,000 customers. CEC holds a 20 percent stake in North South Power Limited which has a 30-year concession to operate the 600MW Shiroro Hydroelectric Power Station in Niger State.

=== Other countries ===
In Namibia, CEC has signed a joint development agreement with the state utility, NamPower, and Kudu Power Limited for development of 800MW-1,050MW combined cycle gas-to-power generation. The company also has a 60 percent interest in Arandis Power, the developer of a 120MW hybrid HFO and renewable generation plant in Arandis, Namibia.

CEC has signed a power purchase agreement (PPA) with the Government of Sierra Leone for a 20-year concession to build and operate a 128MW thermal power project.

== History ==
CEC traces its origin to a company that was called Northern Rhodesia Power Corporation established in 1952. In or around 1954, the company became the Rhodesia-Congo Border Power Corporation whose purpose was to supply reliable and secure electricity to the mines in Northern Rhodesia and the Congo by interconnecting separately run thermal power stations in the mining areas. Later, the company sourced and supplied hydroelectric power from the Congo to supply to the mines in Northern Rhodesia before the production of hydroelectricity from the Kariba Dam.

At Zambia’s independence in 1964, the Rhodesia-Congo Border Power Corporation became Copperbelt Power Company (CPC), an entity that supplied electricity to the mines until 1986 when it was incorporated into the Zambia Consolidated Copper Mines (ZCCM) as its Power Division.

In 1997, CEC was born out of the privatization of ZCCM - Power Division. Cinergy Global Power of the US and National Grid of the UK acquired the controlling stake in the company.

The two investors subsequently sold off their 77 per cent stake in the company to a group of local entrepreneurs. In January 2008, CEC became Zambia’s first power utility to list on the Lusaka Stock Exchange (LuSE) and remains the only one as of 2015.

In 2013 CEC expanded its operations into Nigeria by taking a 75 percent stake in KANN Utility which in turn owns 60 percent of Abuja Electricity Distribution Company. In 2013 the company purchased a 20 percent share of North South Power Limited which has a 30-year concession to operate the 600MW Shiroro hydro power plant in Niger State.
