= Ngonye Falls =

Waterfall in Zambia

Coordinates: 16°39′15″S 23°34′20″E

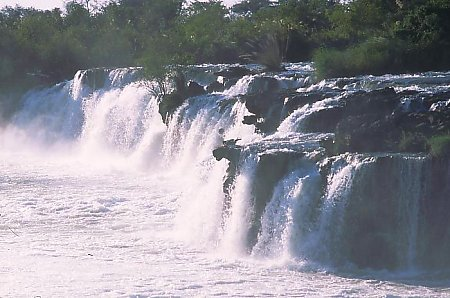
Ngonye Falls, western Zambia

The Ngonye Falls or Sioma Falls is a waterfall on the Zambezi river in Western province Zambia, near the town of Sioma and a few hundred kilometres upstream from the Victoria Falls. Situated in the southern part of Barotseland, the falls are a day's journey by car from the capital, Lusaka. Their inaccessibility makes them much less known than Victoria Falls. The Ngonye Falls Community Partnership Park is located at the falls.

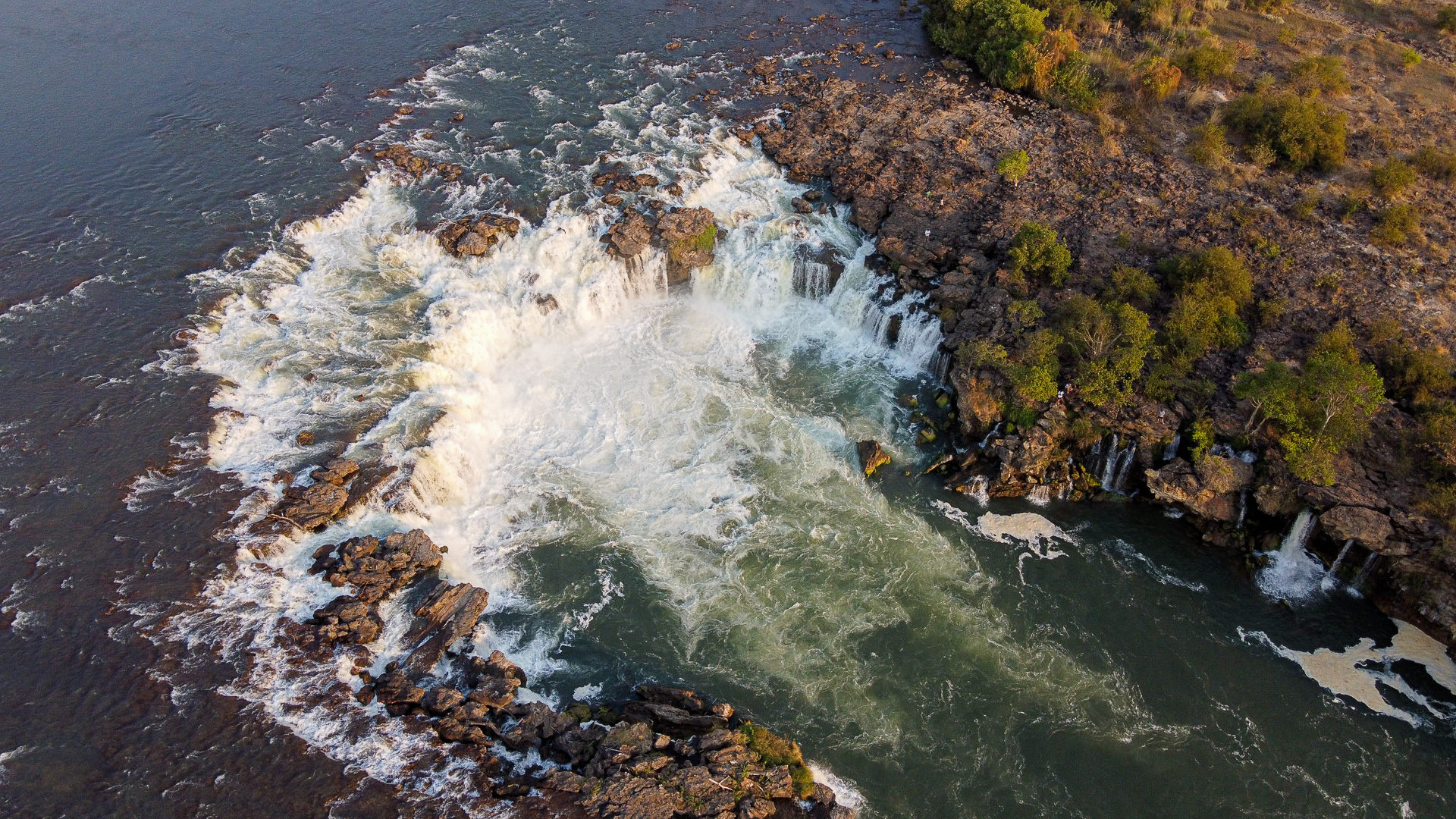
Main branch of the Zambezi River at Ngonye falls, Zambia

The falls are formed by the erosion of a hard sandstone layer to form the drop. Their height is only 10–25 meters (33–82 ft), but the width of the falls is impressive. They form a broad crescent, interrupted by rocky outcrops.

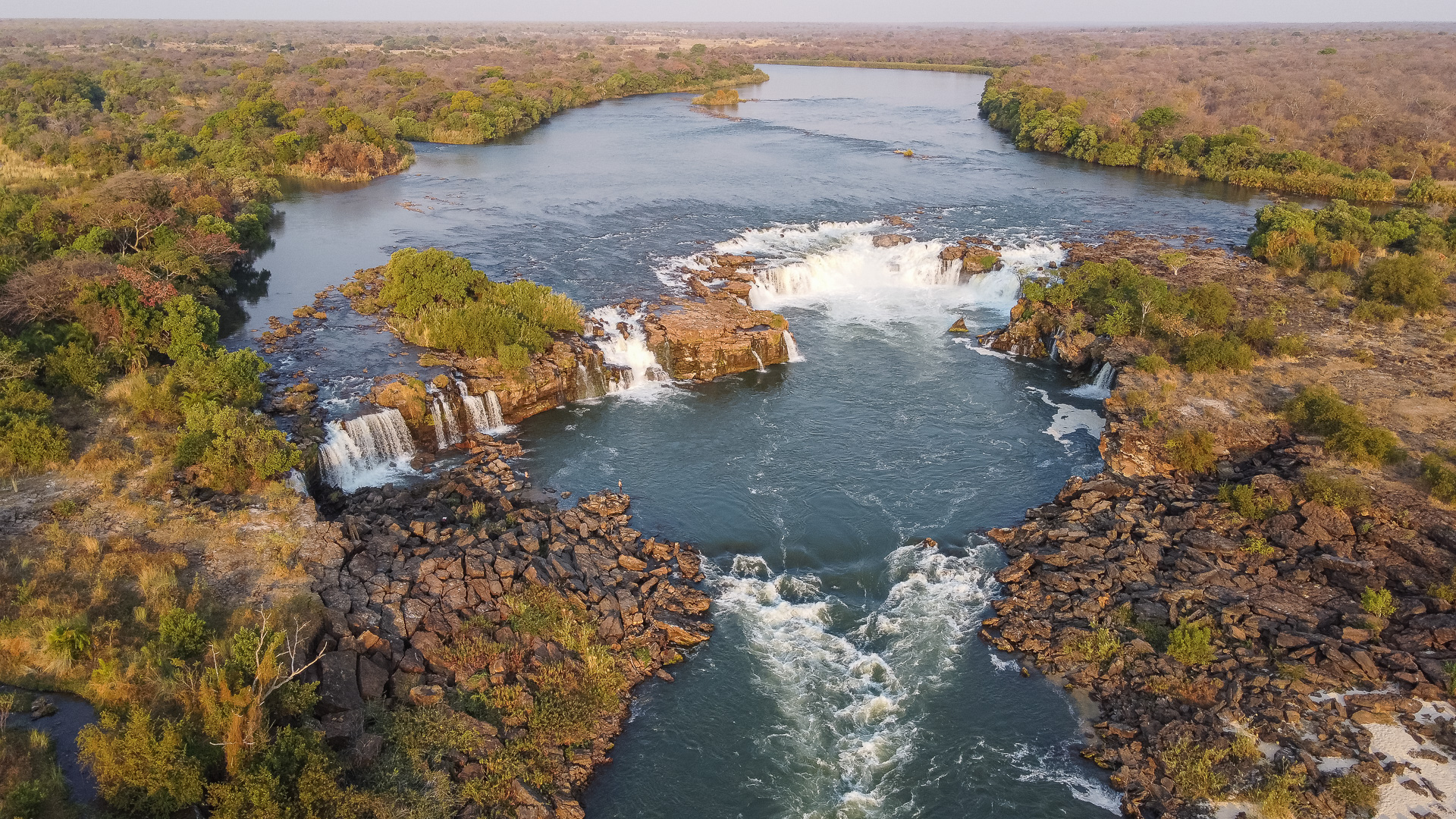
panoramic aerial view of Ngonye falls at Zambezi river, Zambia

Upstream from the falls, the river is broad and shallow as it flows across the Kalahari sands, but below the falls extensive white water rapids exist, as the river is hemmed in by gorges cut into sandstone rock.

== See also ==
- List of waterfalls
- List of waterfalls of Zambia
