= Victoria Falls Power Station =

Hydroelectric power station in Zambia

- Country: Zambia
- Location: Zambia
- Coordinates: 17°55′51″S 25°51′37″E
- Status: Operational
- Operator: ZESCO

Thermal power station
- Primary fuel: Hydropower

Power generation
- Units operational: 12
- Nameplate capacity: 108 MW (145,000 hp)

The Victoria Falls Power Station is a hydroelectric power plant on the Zambezi River in Livingstone, Zambia. It is located in the third gorge below Victoria Falls and consists of three power stations with a total capacity of 108 megawatts (145,000 hp):

- Station A, commissioned in 1936, has an installed capacity of 8 megawatts (11,000 hp): 2 x 1 megawatt (1,300 hp) and 2 x 3 megawatts (4,000 hp) machines.
- Station B, commissioned in 1968, has an installed capacity of 60 megawatts (80,000 hp): 6 x 10 megawatts (13,000 hp) machines.
- Station C, also commissioned in 1968, has an installed capacity of 40 megawatts (54,000 hp): 4 x 10 megawatts (13,000 hp) machines).

The station is owned and operated by Zesco, the state owned power utility.
