= Sioma District =

Coordinates: 15°00′S 22°30′E

- District
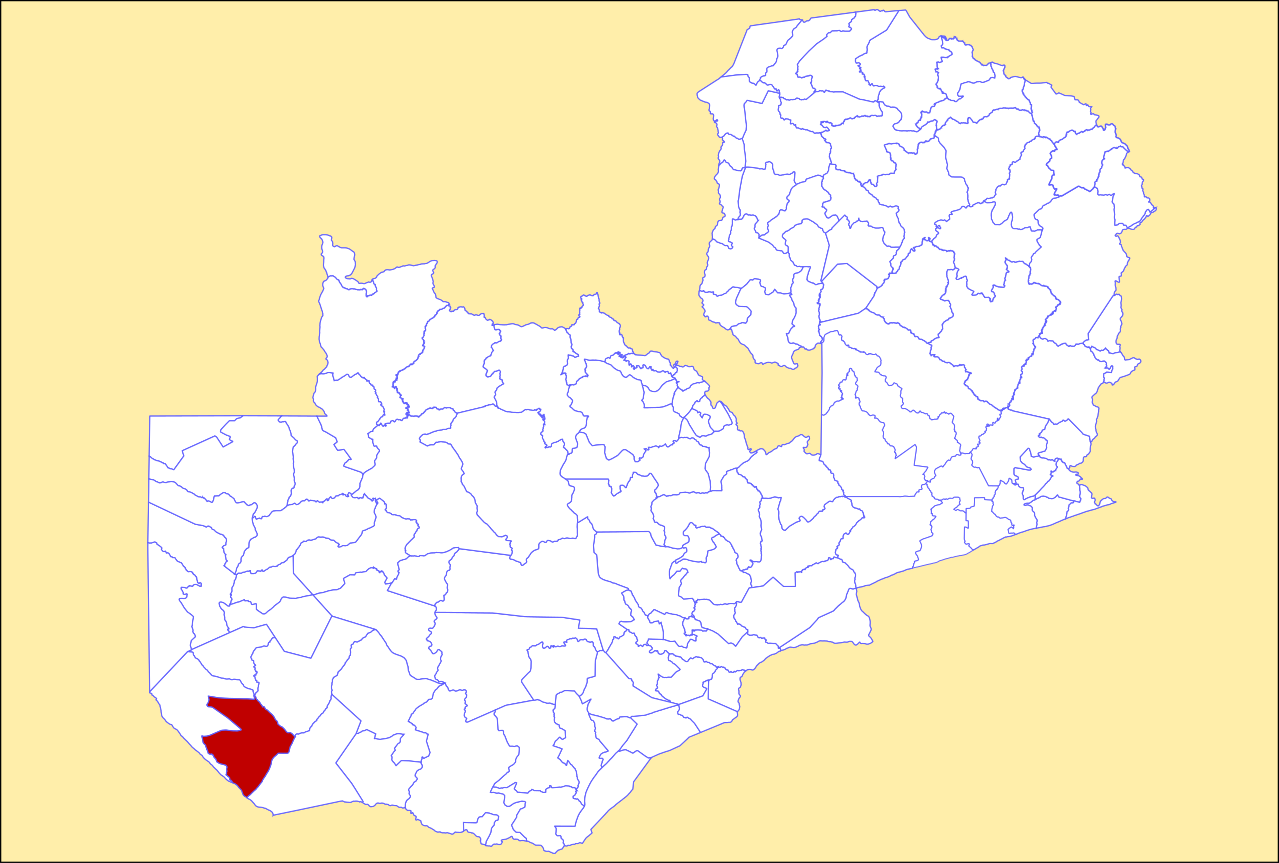
- District location in Zambia
- Country: Zambia
- Province: Western Province
- Capital: Sioma
- Established: 2012

Area
  - Total: 8,452.6 km^{2} (3,263.6 sq mi)
- Elevation: 990 m (3,250 ft)

Population (2022)
  - Total: 65,539
  - Density: 7.7537/km^{2} (20.082/sq mi)
- Time zone: UTC+2 (CAT)

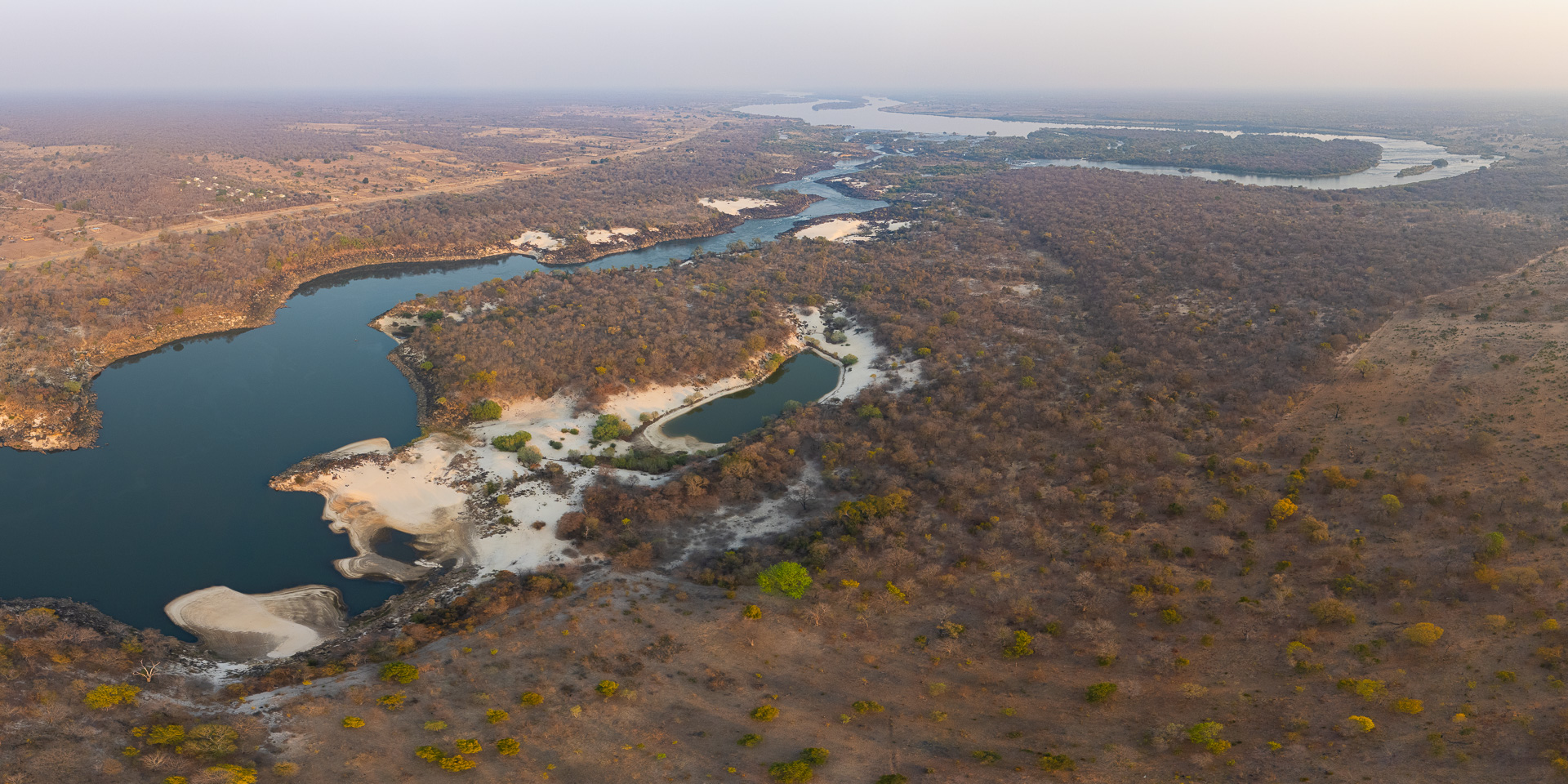
The Zambezi River flowing through Sioma District. Ngonye Falls can be seen in the background.

Sioma District is a district of Zambia, located in Western Province on the west bank of the Zambezi River. The capital lies at Sioma. As of the 2022 Zambian Census, the district had a population of 65,539 people.

The district was created in 2012 by the then president Michael Sata by the splitting of Shangombo District.
