= Kwacha (constituency) =

National Assembly constituency in Zambia

Kwacha is a constituency of the National Assembly of Zambia. It covers the eastern part of Kitwe and a rural area to the east of the city in Kitwe District of Copperbelt Province.

== List of MPs ==
Election year	MP	Party
1973	Laban Lubamba	United National Independence Party
1978	Basil Kabwe	United National Independence Party
1983	Basil Kabwe	United National Independence Party
1988	Austin Sichinga	United National Independence Party
1991	Newstead Zimba	Movement for Multi-Party Democracy
1996	Newstead Zimba	Movement for Multi-Party Democracy
2001	Eugine Appel	Movement for Multi-Party Democracy
2006	Lombe Mulenga	Patriotic Front
2011	Boniface Mutale	Patriotic Front
2016	Joseph Malanji	Patriotic Front
2021	Joseph Malanji	Patriotic Front
2022 (by-election)	Charles Mulenga	United Party for National Development
2026	Brian Chirambo	National Reconciliation Party for Unity and Prosperity
