= Choma District =

Coordinates: 16°40′S 27°10′E

- District
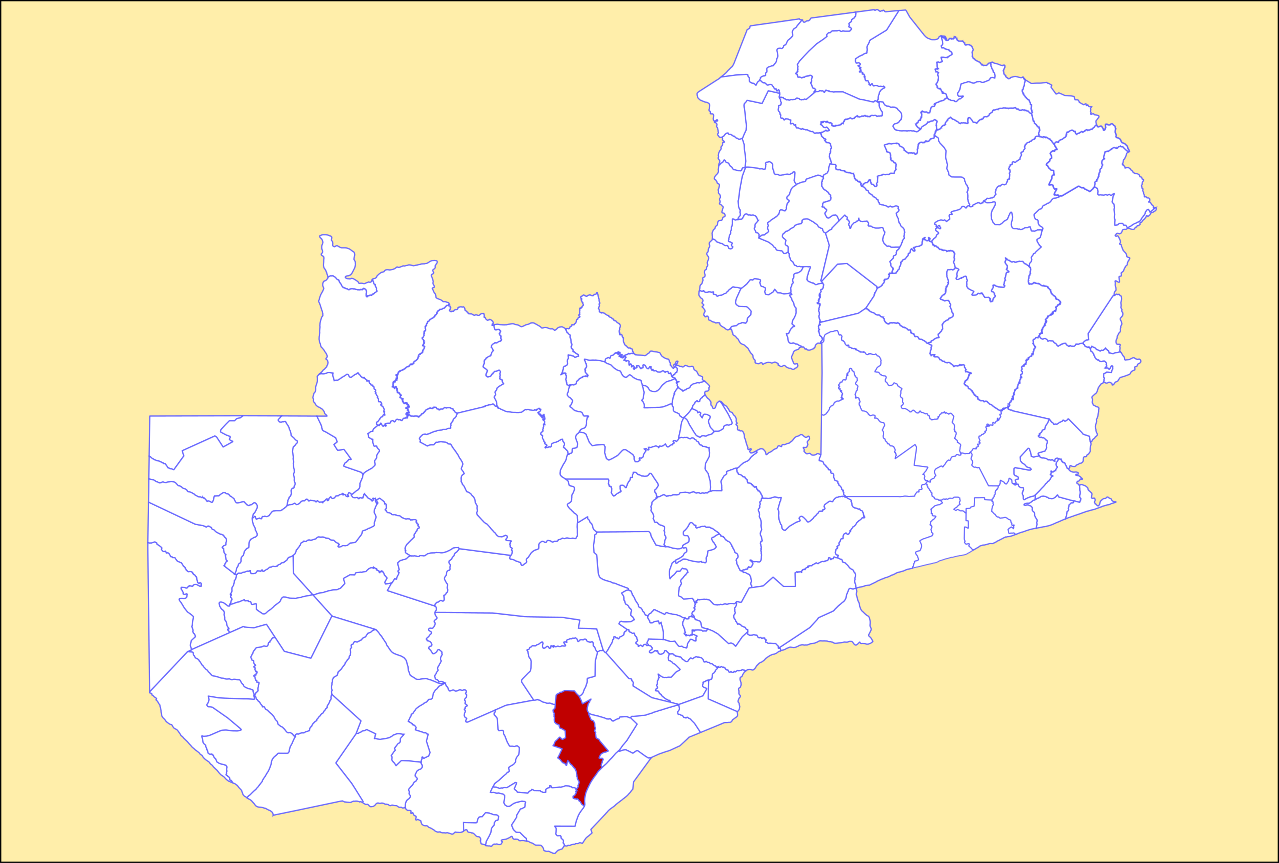
- District location in Zambia
- Country: Zambia
- Province: Southern Province
- Capital: Choma

Area
  - Total: 5,146.4 km^{2} (1,987.0 sq mi)

Population (2022)
  - Total: 266,916
  - Density: 51.865/km^{2} (134.33/sq mi)
- Time zone: UTC+2 (CAT)

Choma District is a district of Zambia, located in Southern Province. The capital lies at Choma. As of the 2022 Zambian Census, the district had a population of 266,916 people. Choma has been the provincial capital of the Southern Province since 2012.

Choma District consists of two constituencies, namely Choma Central and Mbabala.

== See also ==
- Choma Solar Power Station
