= Serenje District =

Coordinates: 13°00′S 30°30′E

- District
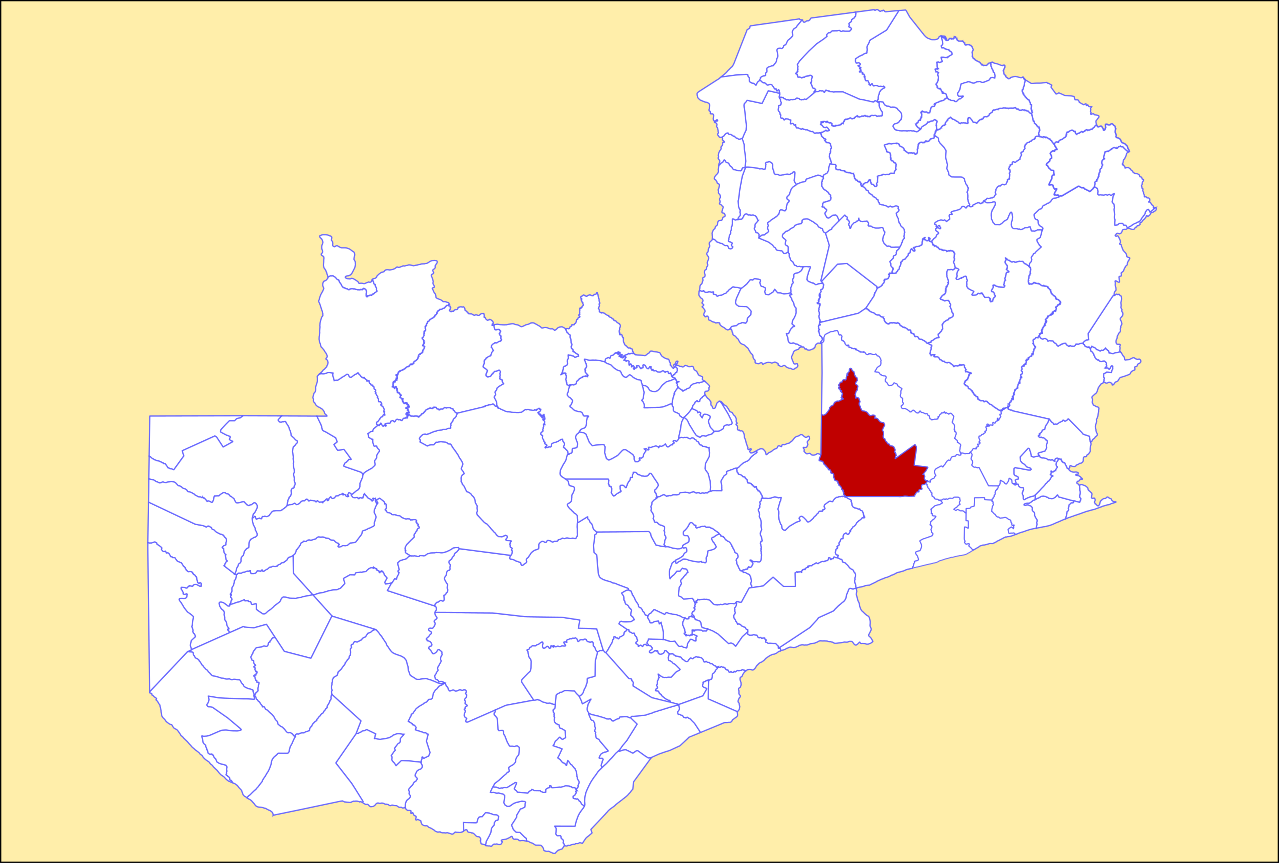
- District location in Zambia
- Country: Zambia
- Province: Central Province
- Capital: Serenje

Area
  - Total: 11,455 km^{2} (4,423 sq mi)

Population (2022)
  - Total: 158,192
  - Density: 13.810/km^{2} (35.767/sq mi)
- Time zone: UTC+2 (CAT)

Serenje District is a district of Zambia, located in Central Province. The capital lies at Serenje. As of the 2022 Zambian Census, the district had a population of 158,192 people. It consists of two constituencies, namely Serenje and Muchinga. The district contains Lake Lusiwasi.

Serenje Solar Power Station, the largest solar power station in Zambia, as of July 2021 is under development in the district, by Ultra Green Corporation Zambia Limited, a 100 percent subsidiary of Ultra Green Corporation Inc., an independent power producer, based in the United States.
