= Chitambo District =

Coordinates: 12°52′S 30°34′E

- District
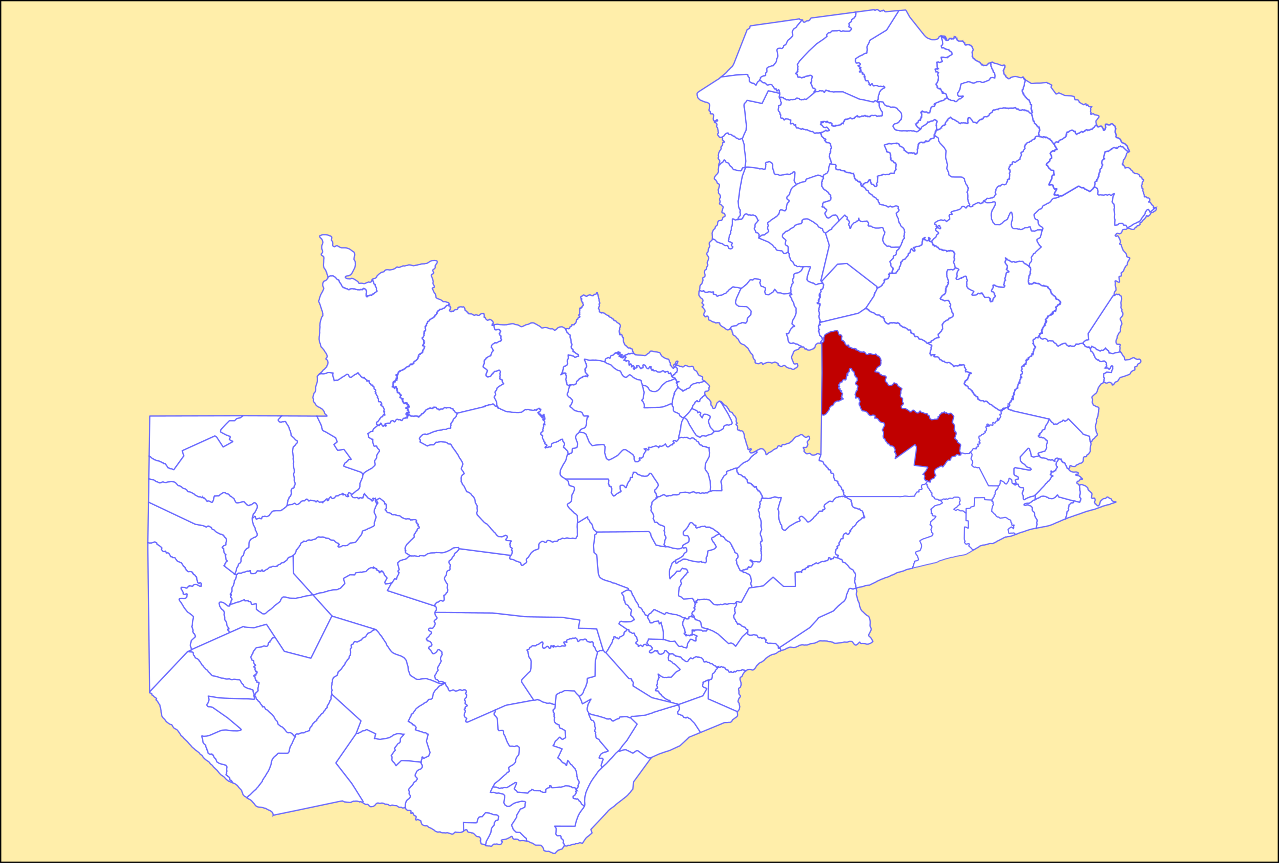
- District location in Zambia
- Country: Zambia
- Province: Central Province
- Capital: Chitambo

Area
  - Total: 11,884.5 km^{2} (4,588.6 sq mi)

Population (2022)
  - Total: 100,603
  - Density: 8.46506/km^{2} (21.9244/sq mi)
- Time zone: UTC+2 (CAT)

Chitambo District is a district of Central Province, Zambia. It was separated from Serenje District in 2012 and is located some 357km north-east of Kabwe along the Great North Road. As of the 2022 Zambian Census, the district had a population of 100,603 people.

It shares borders with Serenje, Samfya (Luapula Province), Lavushimanda (Muchinga Province) and the Democratic Republic of Congo.

The Livingstone Memorial is located within this district.

== Agriculture and Agro-processing ==
Chitambo District has a very good rainfall distribution throughout the rainy season, favoring agriculture production. In addition, the district soil profile supports crop agriculture, especially leguminous crops such as beans, soya beans and pigeon peas. Other crops that have high potential and are grown in the district include; finger millet, sweet potatoes, groundnuts, sunflower, pumpkins, watermelons, pineapples, and other vegetable crops grown off-season. The district claims to have over 15,000 small-scale farmers. With the high number of small scale farmers and a wide variety of crops produced in the District, opportunities exist for investment in agro-processing and packaging of the crops produced. The many small scale farmers could easily form out-grower schemes to support a sustained supply of the required input for processing to eastern markets via Tanzania, western markets via DR Congo and locally.
