= Kitwe District =

Coordinates: 12°45′S 28°15′E

- District
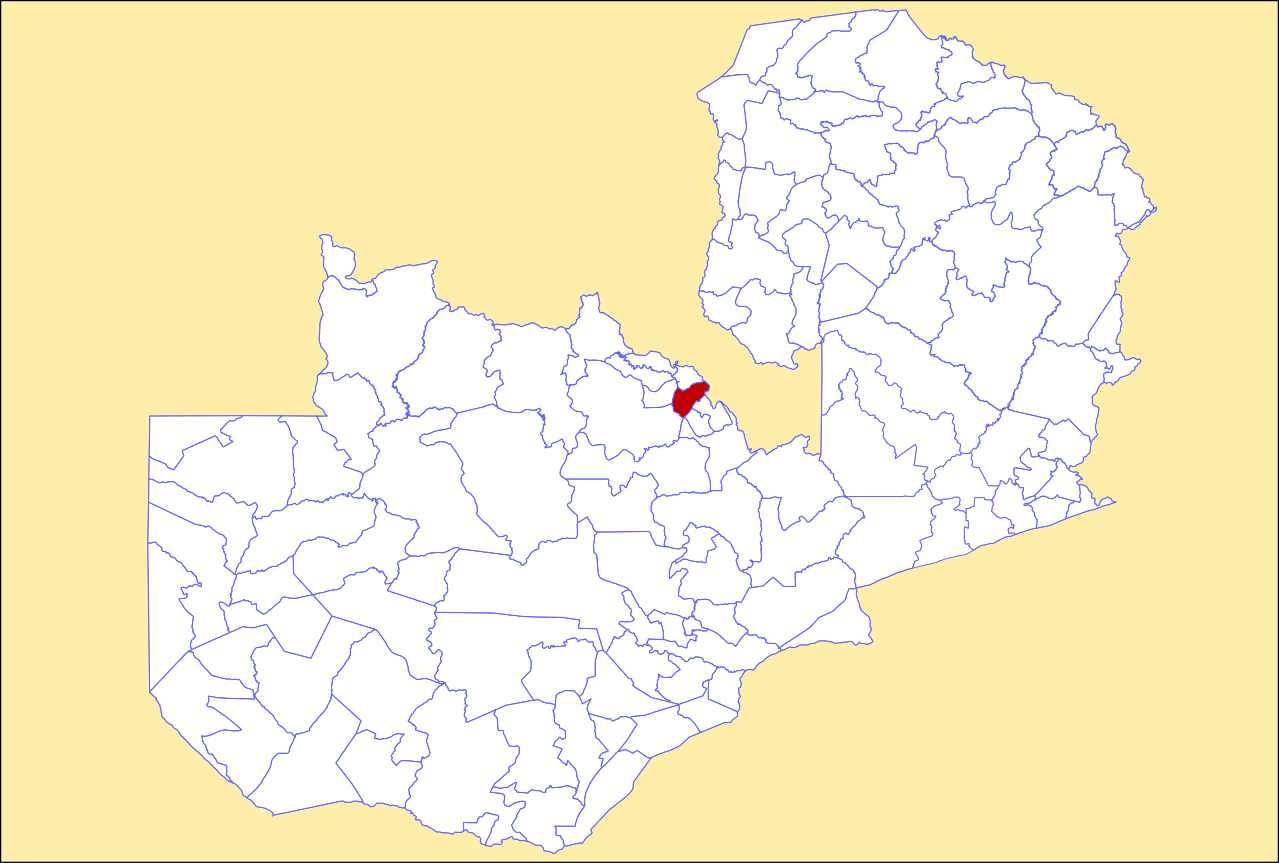
- District location in Zambia
- Country: Zambia
- Province: Copperbelt Province
- Capital: Kitwe

Area
  - Total: 812.5 km^{2} (313.7 sq mi)

Population (2022)
  - Total: 661,901
  - Density: 814.6/km^{2} (2,110/sq mi)
- Time zone: UTC+2 (CAT)

Kitwe District is a district of Zambia, located in Copperbelt Province. The capital is Kitwe. As of the 2022 Zambian Census, the district had a population of 661,901 people.

== Constituencies ==
Kitwe District is divided into five constituencies, namely:

- Nkana
- Wusakile
- Kamfinsa
- Chimwemwe
- Kwacha

== Notable places ==
- Kitwe Public Library
- Kitwe Teaching Hospital
- Nkana Stadium
- Arthur Davies Stadium
- Nkana mine
- Ek Park
- Copperbelt University
- Mukuba University
