= ZESCO =

Zambian national electricity company

Zambia Electricity Supply Corporation Limited
- Type: Public
- Industry: Electricity Generation and Supply
- Founded: 1970
- Headquarters: Lusaka, Zambia
- Revenue: US$409 million (2017)
- Number of employees: 3,600 (2007)
- Parent: State owned
- Website: www.zesco.co.zm

ZESCO (acronym for Zambia Electricity Supply Corporation Limited) is a state-owned power company in Zambia. It is Zambia's largest power company, producing approximately 80% of the country's electricity consumption. Additionally, ZESCO represents Zambia in the Southern African Power Pool.

== History ==
ZESCO was formed as Zambia Electricity Supply Corporation Limited by the National Assembly of Zambia in December 1969. It took over responsibilities from several municipalities and the three existing utilities: Victoria Falls Power Board, Central Electricity Corporation, and Northern Electricity Supply Corporation.

== Operations ==
The company operates nine hydropower stations with a combined potential capacity of 2,217.5 MW and eight small thermal power plants with a combined potential capacity of 11.3 MW, resulting in a total of 2,228.8 MW. Due to poor maintenance and substandard practices, these capacities are not achieved.

Moreover, the company also owns and operates power distribution and transmission lines of 9,975 km.

ZESCO has formed power purchase agreements with private companies that own power plants in Zambia. It purchases the power produced and feeds part of it into the national grid, with a larger portion resold to neighboring countries. GL Africa Energy provides the national grid through ZESCO with over 105 MW of power under this agreement.

ZESCO owns 40% shares in EL Sewedy Electric Zambia Limited.

In June 2022, ZESCO signed a 13-year Bulk Supply Agreement (BSA) with Copperbelt Energy Corporation (CEC) Plc. The power supply limit under the BSA was set at 380MW. ZESCO estimated that it will earn an estimated US$150.0 million per annum from the agreement. These earnings are expected to translate into an estimated US$2.0 billion over the lifetime of the BSA.

In July 2022, at the 94th Agricultural and Commercial Show in Lusaka, the managing director of the National Utility ZESCO, Victor Mapani, announced that the company plans to deploy Electric Vehicle (EV) charging stations across the country in an effort to accelerate and promote the transition to EVs and enhance carbon emission reduction.

In November 2024, Zambia experienced several nationwide blackouts.

In 2024, ZESCO reported losses of K5.1 million from infrastructure vandalism and K7.46 million in property damage in December alone. The country also faced prolonged load-shedding, initially promising seven hours of daily power supply, which was later reduced to five hours by mid-2025 due to the shutdown of a Maamba generator. To address power shortages, ZESCO commissioned the 100 MW Chisamba Solar Power Plant in June 2025 and signed PPAs totaling 332 MWp with independent producers for completion by 2026.

== Power stations ==
- Kafue Gorge Lower, 750 MW
- Kafue Gorge Upper, 990 MW
- Kariba North Bank, 720 MW
- Kariba North Bank Extension, 360 MW
- Victoria Falls, 108 MW
- Itezhi-Tezhi Dam, 120 MW
- Maamba Collieries Thermal Power Station, 300 MW

== Limitations ==
The national grid in Zambia only extends to some parts of the country. For example, it ends 380 kilometres (240 mi) from the Ikelenge area around Kalene Hill in the extreme northwest. As of 2008, ZESCO had no plans to provide power to this remote area due to an increase in shareholder allotments. In response, some small-scale private operations have been established, such as the Zengamina 700 KW hydroelectric generator. The Energy Regulation Board is encouraging private investment in hydroelectric power generation in view of the power deficit. For example, ZESCO has partnered with SinoHydro, a state-run hydropower company in China, to expand Zambia's power grid.

One-third of Zambia's US$9.7 billion in debt is owed to China, raising concerns the country will have to yield control of ZESCO to China. Amos Chanda, a spokesman for the Zambian President, refuted such claims by U.S. National Security Advisor John Bolton in 2018, stating ZESCO is by no means collateral for Zambia's debt to China. Nonetheless, many remain critical of ZESCO's borrowing practices, citing associated debt as a potential risk to Zambian sovereignty.

== See also ==
- Economy of Zambia
- List of Zambian Companies
- "ZESCO to increase electricity tariffs with effect from 1st July 2014".
