= AccessBank =

AccessBank may refer to:

- AccessBank Group, a group of micro-financial institutions started by and majority owned by AccessHolding, a German financial conglomerate
  - AccessBank Azerbaijan, a microfinance bank in Azerbaijan
  - AccessBank Liberia, a microfinance bank in Liberia
  - AccessBank Tanzania, a microfinance bank in Tanzania
  - AccessBank Zambia, a microfinance bank in Zambia
  - AccessBank Liberia, a microfinance bank in Liberia
