= Access Bank =

Access Bank may refer to:

- Access Bank Group, a multinational financial services company, with headquarters in Nigeria and subsidiaries in eight sub-Saharan African countries and the UK:
  - Access Bank plc, a commercial bank in Nigeria
  - Access Bank Ghana, a commercial bank in Ghana
  - Access Bank Rwanda, a commercial bank in Rwanda
  - Access Bank Zambia, a commercial bank in Zambia

== See also ==
- Access Bank Nigerian Government Bond Index
