= Barbara Barungi =

Ugandan economist and corporate executive

- Born: Uganda
- Education: Makerere University; University of Glasgow
- Occupations: Economist, Businesswoman and Corporate Executive
- Years active: 1990s – present
- Known for: Leadership & Business expertise
- Title: Founder & Managing Partner of Imara Africa Consulting

Barbara Barungi, is a Ugandan economist, businesswoman and corporate executive who serves as the managing partner of Imara Africa Consulting, a pan-African economic, business and policy consulting group with offices in Nigeria, Kenya and Uganda. She concurrently serves as the non-executive chairperson of the board of Access Bank Kenya, the first woman to serve in that capacity.

== Background and education ==
Barungi is a Ugandan national, born circa in the 1970s. She attended local primary and secondary schools. She was admitted to Makerere University, the largest and oldest public university in the country. She graduated with a degree of Bachelor of Arts in economics and sociology. She went on to obtain a Post Graduate Diploma in Development Policy and a Master of Philosophy degree in International Finance, both from the University of Glasgow.

== Career ==
She has a career that goes back over 30 years in management consulting, economic management and academia. She previously worked as a lead economist for the UN Development Programme and later, the African Development Bank. Some of the countries she covered under her watch include Nigeria, Angola, Botswana, Lesotho, Malawi, Mozambique, Namibia, South Africa and Zimbabwe. She serves as an independent non-executive director on the board of Access Bank South Africa, in addition to working as chairperson of the board of Access Bank Kenya.

She also spent a brief period as an advisor to the Rwanda Ministry of Finance. She has, in the past lectured in economics at Makerere University, in Uganda, and at the University of the Witswatersrand in South Africa.

== Other considerations ==
In March 2022, the Daily Monitor Newspaper listed her among nine Ugandan women who were qualified to work as the Governor of the Bank of Uganda, the CEO of the county's central bank and national banking regulator.

== See also ==
- Annet Nakawunde Mulindwa
- Nakanyike Musisi
