= Access Bank Rwanda =

Commercial bank in Rwanda

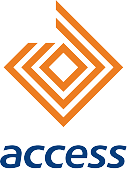
- Type: Subsidiary of Access Bank Group
- Industry: Financial services
- Founded: 2009; 17 years ago
- Headquarters: KIC (former UTC), 3rd Floor, KN 4 Ave, Kigali, Rwanda
- Key people: Faustin Rukundo Byishimo (Managing Director)
- Products: Loans, checking, savings, investments, debit cards
- Revenue: ▲Aftertax:US$5.217 million (RWF:6,717,917,000) (2023)
- Total assets: US$179.44 million (RWF:231.06 billion) (2023)
- Number of employees: 150 (2011)
- Website: rwanda.accessbankplc.com

Access Bank Rwanda is a commercial bank in Rwanda. It is one of the commercial banks licensed by the National Bank of Rwanda, the national banking regulator.

== Overview ==
The bank is a medium-sized financial institution in Rwanda. According to its web site, it is the fourth-largest commercial bank in the country, based on assets. As of December 2023, the bank's total assets were US$179.44 million (RWF:231.06 billion), with shareholders equity of about US$25.9 million (RWF:33.37 billion).

== History ==
Access Bank (Rwanda) PLC is a commercial bank that operates in Rwanda. The bank was officially launched in January, 2009 after fulfilling all regulatory requirements. Formerly BANCOR SA Rwanda and created in 1995 by foreign investors, the bank was restructured in 2001 after its takeover by Rwandan and South African private investors. Having commenced operations in Kigali, the Bank has since expanded its operations by extending its network to Nyabugogo, Rubavu and Rusizi. Access Bank Plc, one of the largest banks in Nigeria, officially acquired BANCOR S.A. after its successful acquisition of a 75 percent stake.

== Access Bank Group ==
Access Bank Rwanda is a member of the Access Bank Group, the largest financial services provider in Nigeria, based on assets, as of June 2023. Other member companies of the group include:

- Access Bank Plc – Nigeria
- Omnifinance Bank – Ivory Coast
- Banque Privée du Congo – Democratic Republic of the Congo
- Access Bank Rwanda – Rwanda
- Access Bank Sierra Leone – Sierra Leone
- Access Bank Gambia – The Gambia
- Access Bank United Kingdom – United Kingdom
- Access Bank Zambia – Zambia
- Finbank Burundi – Burundi
- Access Bank Kenya - Kenya
- Access Bank South Africa – South Africa
- Access Bank Uganda – Uganda

== Ownership ==
The bank's stock is owned by the following corporate entities and private individuals:

Access Bank Rwanda Stock Ownership

Rank	Name of Owner	Percentage Ownership
1	Access Bank Group	75.0
2	Rwandan & South African Investors	25.0
	Total	100.00

== Access Bank Rwanda - Branch Network ==
As of April 2022, the bank maintains branches in the following locations:

- Access Bank Rwanda Head Office - KN4 Ave, 3rd Floor- KIC Building (Formerly known as UTC Building), Kigali Rwanda
- Remera Branch - Remera, Kigali, Rwanda
- Nyabugogo - Nyarugenge, Kigali, Rwanda
- Rubavu - Rubavu District
- Musanze- Musanze District
- Rusizi - Rusizi District
- CHIC Branch - Kigali, Rwanda
- KICUKIRO / Mt. Meru Station - Kigali, Rwanda

== See also ==
- List of banks in Rwanda
