= AB Bank Zambia =

Coordinates: 15°25′23″S 28°17′01″E

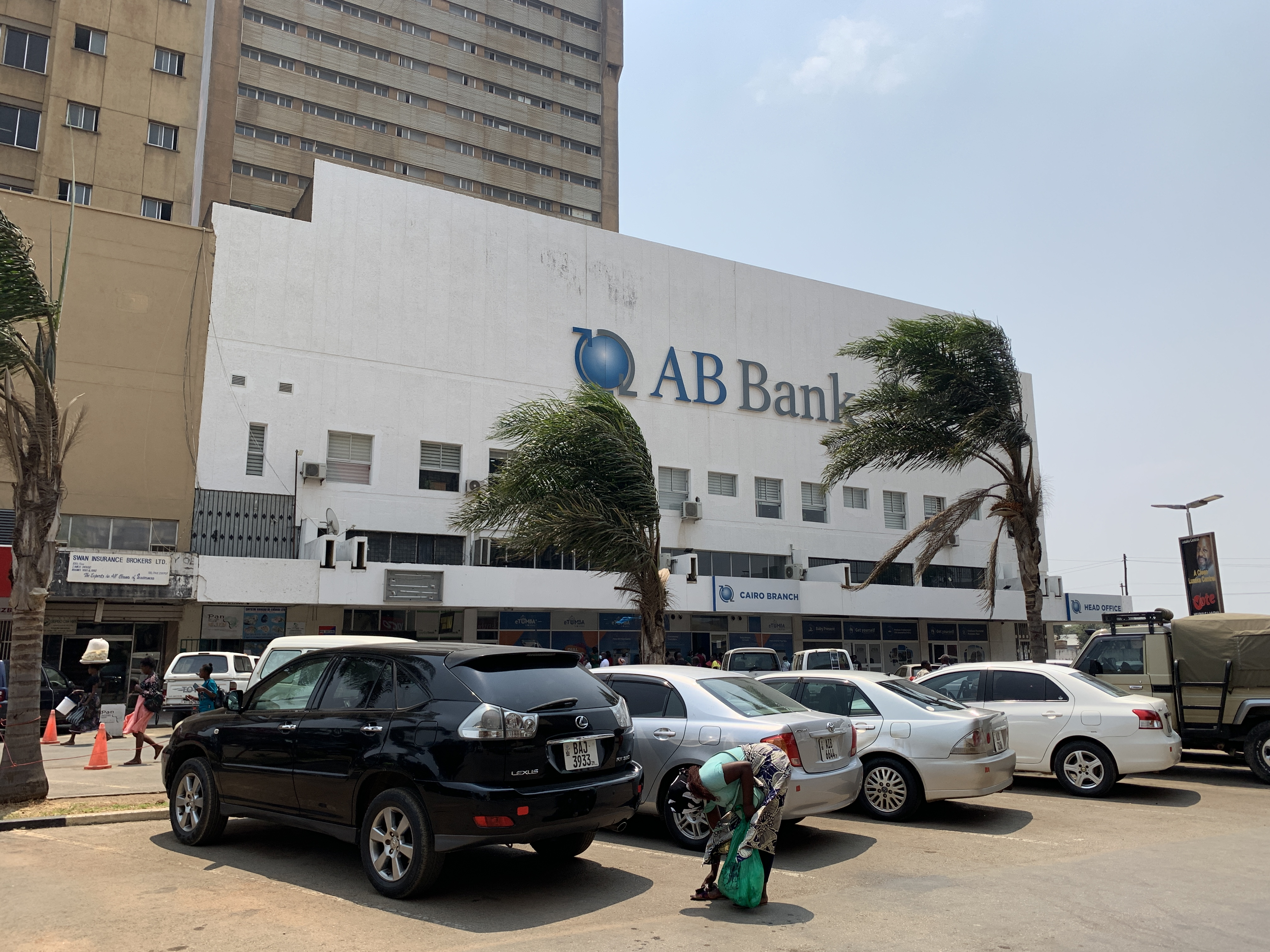
- Type: Private
- Industry: Financial services
- Founded: 2011
- Headquarters: Lusaka, Zambia
- Products: Loans, Checking, Savings, Investments, Debit Cards
- Total assets: US$14.6 million (2014)

AB Bank Zambia is a commercial bank in Zambia, licensed by the Bank of Zambia and by the national banking regulator. It is a member of AccessHolding, a banking group which operates a network of commercial banks and microfinance institutions in developing and transition countries with a target group focus on micro, small and medium-sized enterprises.

== Main Location ==
The headquarters of AB Bank Zambia are located on Chainda Place, in Lusaka, the capital and largest city in the country. The coordinates of the bank's headquarters are: 15°25'23.0"S, 28°17'01.0"E (Latitude:-15.423053; Longitude:28.283612).

== Overview ==
The bank began operations on 18 October 2011, following the issuance of a commercial banking license by the Bank of Zambia. The bank's shareholders are five international development institutions. The target clientele of the bank are Zambian micro, small and medium-sized businesses, who have been left out of the formal economy by the traditional commercial banks. The bank also targets low income earners in the country. The bank maintains a facility for small-scale farmers.

== Shareholding ==
The shareholding in the stock of the bank, is as illustrated in the table below:

AB Bank Zambia Stock Ownership
Rank	Name of Owner	Percentage Ownership
1	AccessBank Group	51.0
2	FMO	12.5
3	IFC	12.5
4	Incofin	12.5
5	KfW	12.5
	Total	100.00

- Note: Incofin is an international development fund that invests in microfinance institutions that serve under-served populations, especially those serving agricultural communities.

== Branches ==
As of April 2016, the bank maintains branches at the following locations:

1. Cairo Road Branch - Chainda Place, Off Cairo Road, Lusaka Main Branch
2. Chilenje Branch - Chilenje Shopping Mall, Muraba Road, Chilenje, Lusaka
3. Matero Branch - B & J Building, Commonwealth Road, Matero, Lusaka
4. Kalingalinga Branch - Alick Nkhata Road, Kalingalinga
5. Chelston Branch - Chelston Bazzar Complex, Chelston
6. Garden Branch - Garden Township, Lusaka.
7. Kitwe Branch - Kitwe

== See also ==
- AccessHolding
- List of banks in Zambia
