= Intermarket Bank =

Defunct Zambian commercial bank

- Type: Private
- Industry: Financial services
- Defunct: 2016
- Headquarters: Lusaka, Zambia
- Key people: Joseph Toubi (chairman); Robert Nkous (managing director)
- Products: Loans, checking, savings, investments, debit cards
- Website: Homepage

Intermarket Bank was a commercial bank in Zambia. It is one of the commercial banks licensed by the Bank of Zambia, the national banking regulator.

== History ==
In March 2010, at the direction of the Bank of Zambia, Afriland First Bank Group, based in Yaoundé, Cameroon, acquired 80% shareholding in Intermarket Bank, for an undisclosed sum. Sabre Capital, the former majority shareholder in Intermarket Bank retained 20% ownership. Afriland also took 80% shareholding in Intermarket Securities, which is 100% owned by Intermarket Bank. The new majority owners were to keep the Intermarket brand until 2013, when they would switch to the Afriland brand. with liabilities over the assets, it became potentially difficult for the bank to honour its financial obligations.

== Ownership ==
As of March 2010, the bank's stock was owned by the following corporate entities:

Intermarket Bank stock ownership
Rank	Name of owner	Percentage ownership
1	Afriland First Bank of Cameroon	80.00
2	Sabre Capital Worldwide Inc. of the United Kingdom	20.00
	Total	100.00

== Branch network ==
The bank maintained headquarters in Lusaka, Zambia's capital and largest city. The bank had the following branches:

- Lusaka Main Branch - Lusaka
- Manda Hill Branch - Manda Hill Shopping Mall, Lusaka
- New Soweto Branch - New Soweto, Lusaka
- NIPA Agency Branch - Lusaka
- Kamwala Branch - Kamwala
- Chawama Branch - Chawama
- Kitwe Branch - Kitwe

== Governance ==
Joseph Toubi has served as Afriland First Bank Group's executive vice president since 2008. He has been in the banking sector since 1989. After implementing the Organization Department and the department in charge of overhead management in Société Générale de Banques au Cameroun, he joined Afriland First Bank Cameroon as an internal auditor in 1997. He was advisor to the chairman of Afriland First Group for nine years before becoming the group executive vice president in charge of business development and internationalrRelations. He was also the chairman of the board of Afriland First Bank in the Democratic Republic of Congo, and of the Intermarket Banking Corporation. He was part of the team of four experts set up by the Cameroonian government to implement the Douala Stock Exchange in 2002.

Robert Nkous has served as the managing director of Intermarket Banking Corporation since January 2012.

== Closure ==
In 2016, the Bank of Zambia seized and closed Intermarket Bank because it was insolvent and unable to meet its financial obligations. In February 2017, the central bank announced that it would re-structure the collapsed bank, to enable it to re-open.

After reaching agreements with the shareholders of the collapsed bank, the restructured bank was opened, with new shareholders and under new management on 23 October 2018.The restructured bank was named Zambia Industrial Commercial Bank.

== See also ==
- Afriland First Bank
- Bank of Zambia
- List of banks in Zambia
- Economy of Zambia
