= TNFC =

TNFC may refer to:

- Team Northumbria F.C.
- The Natural Fibre Company
- Thurnby Nirvana F.C.
- Trans National Finance Company
- Thursday Night Fight Club
