= First Alliance Bank Zambia Limited =

Commercial bank in Zambia

- Type: Private
- Industry: Banking
- Founded: January 1, 1994; 32 years ago
- Headquarters: Lusaka, Zambia
- Key people: Sanmukh R. Patel; Chairman; Kuldip Paliwal; Managing Director
- Products: Loans, credit cards, savings, investments, mortgages
- Revenue: ▲ Aftertax: ZMW:14,826,000 (US$575,582) (2019)
- Total assets: ZMW:940,577,000 (US$36,515,500) (2019)
- Number of employees: 112 (2019)
- Website: Homepage

First Alliance Bank Zambia Limited (FABZL), also known as First Alliance Bank (Zambia), is a commercial bank in Zambia. It is licensed by Bank of Zambia, the central bank and national banking regulator. As of December 2019, the bank's total assets were valued at ZMW:940,577,000 (US$36.5 million).

== Location ==
The headquarters and main branch of the bank are located in Alliance House, at 627 Cairo Road, in the city of Lusaka, the capital and largest city of Zambia. The geographical coordinates of the bank's headquarters are: 15°25'25.0"S, 28°16'57.0"E (Latitude:-15.423611; Longitude:28.282500).

== Overview ==
FABZL is a small financial services provider in Zambia, providing retail banking services to the communities it serves. Its niche market is the corporate clients in the mining and manufacturing sectors of the Zambian economy. As of December 2019, the bank controlled total assets of ZMW:940,577,000 (US$36.5 million), with shareholders' equity of ZMW:234,359,000 (US$9.1 million). At that time the bank employed 112 people.

== History ==
The bank was founded in 1994 by four businessmen, each controlling an equal shareholding position. Starting with one branch in Lusaka, Zambia's capital and largest city, the bank opened branches in other cities and towns in the country, focusing on the copper-belt region of the country.

== Ownership ==
The stock of First Alliance Bank Zambia Limited is privately held by five individuals. The table below shows the ownership percentage of each shareholder, as of September 2019:

First Alliance Bank Zambia Limited Stock Ownership
Rank	Name of Owner	Percentage Ownership
1	Sanmukh R. Patel	25.0
2	Daxa Patel	25.0
3	Mahendra Patel	25.0
4	Vasant Patel	24.0
5	Nitesh Patel	1.0
	Total	100.00

== Branch network ==
The bank maintains five branches in the country, at the following locations, as of May 2018.

1. Main Branch: Alliance House, Cairo Road, Lusaka
2. Industrial Branch: 5126 Lumumba Road, Lusaka
3. East Park Branch: East Park Mall, First Floor, Unit D, at the corner of Thabo Mbeki Road and Great East Road, Lusaka
4. Kitwe Branch: 8721 City Gate Office Park, President Avenue, Kitwe
5. Ndola Branch: 16A President Avenue, Ndola.

== Governance ==
The Chairman of the seven-person Board of Directors is Sanmukh R. Patel. The Managing Director is Kuldip Paliwal. The chairman is a shareholder in the bank.

== See also ==
- List of banks in Zambia
- Bank of Zambia
- Economy of Zambia
