= Bidvest Group =

South African holding company

Bidvest Group Limited

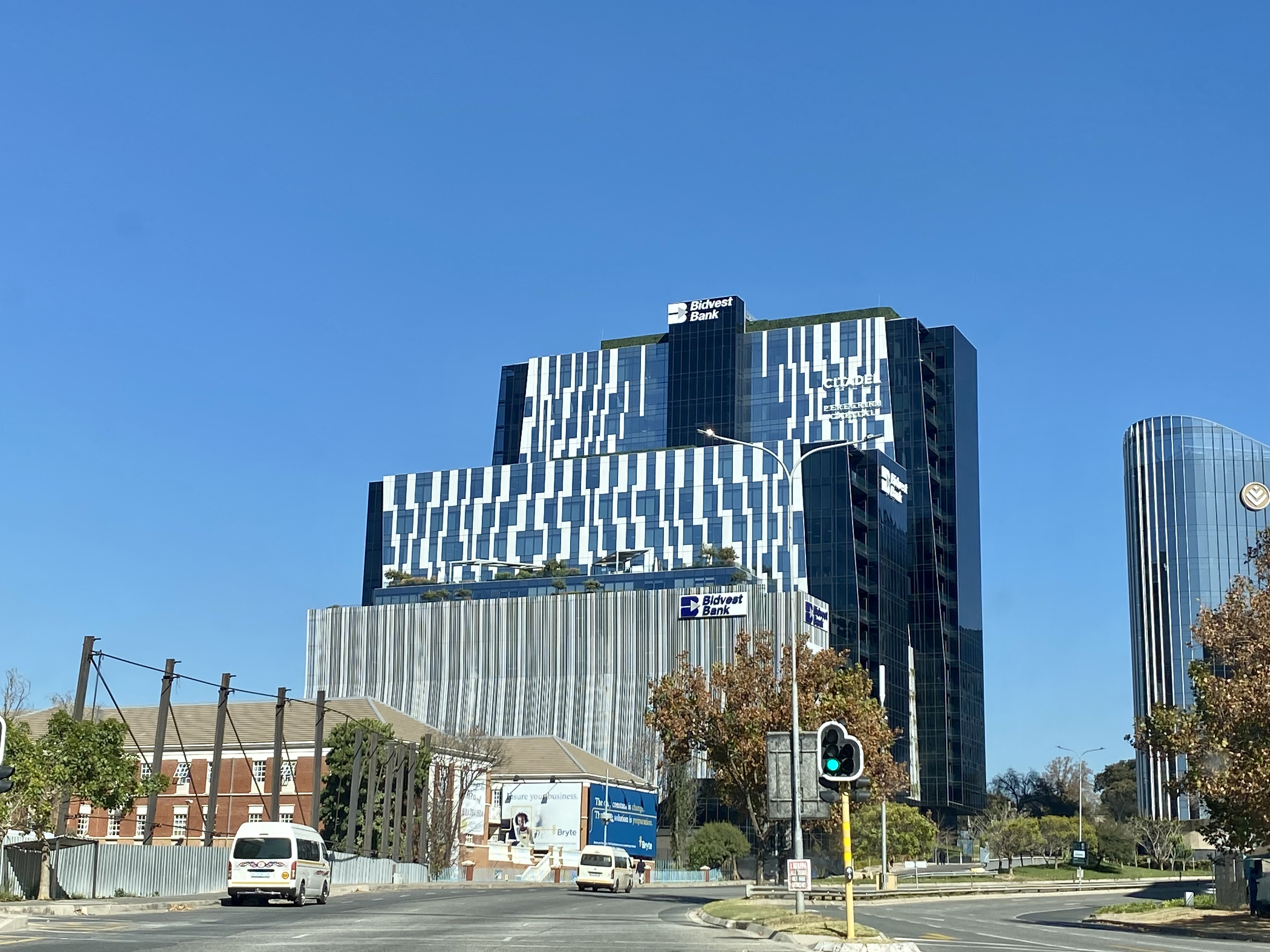
- Bidvest Bank headquarters in Sandton
- Type: Public company
- Traded as: JSE: BVT
- ISIN: ZAE000117321
- Industry: Diversified investments
- Founder: Brian Joffe
- Headquarters: Johannesburg, Gauteng, South Africa
- Area served: Africa
- Key people: Bonang Francis Mohale (Chairman); Mpumi Madisa (CEO)
- Services: Services, Trading, Distribution
- Revenue: ▲ R126.61 billion (2025)
- Operating income: ▼ R10.73 billion (2025)
- Net income: ▼ R6.44 billion (2025)
- Total assets: ▲ R124.59 billion (2025)
- Total equity: ▲ R41.41billion (2025)
- Website: bidvest.com

Bidvest Group is a South African multinational services, trading, and distribution company. Founded in 1988 and listed on the JSE, Bidvest is headquartered in Johannesburg, Gauteng. The group operates over 250 businesses across South Africa, Australia, Singapore, Spain, Ireland, and the United Kingdom.

== History ==
Bidvest was founded in 1988 by Brian Joffe, and listed on the JSE Limited in 1990. The Bidvest Group Limited has a corporate office in Johannesburg, South Africa.

A plan, first developed in 2012 and coming to fruition in 2016, saw the conglomerate unbundle its businesses. It split into a number of different businesses and sold off some others. One of the biggest was the separating of the Bidvest Food Services into a new listed company named Bidcorp that would focus on the food production and distribution businesses.

In 2017, Bidvest Group employed over 132,000 people.

In December 2024, Bidvest Group sold subsidiary Bidvest Bank to Access Bank South Africa, a local subsidiary of Nigerian banking group Access Bank. The deal had a total value of R2.8 billion.

== Operations ==
Bidvest operates through two principal segments – business services and trading and distribution. These encompass businesses involved in outsourced services; freight management; industrial and consumer products; office products; and automotive retailing, among others. Bidvest's portfolio includes six principal divisions; Services South Africa, Services International, Freight, Branded Products, Commercial Products, and Automotive.

== Subsidiaries ==
As of 2026, major companies that form part of Bidvest Group include:

| Company | Sector | HQ | Established | Acquired | Ref |
|---|---|---|---|---|---|
| Adcock Ingram | Pharmaceuticals | Midrand, Gauteng | 1891; 135 years ago | 2021; 5 years ago | |
| Bidvest International Logistics | Logistics | Johannesburg, Gauteng | 1910; 116 years ago | – | |
| Bidvest McCarthy | Automotive | Johannesburg, Gauteng | 1894; 132 years ago | 2004; 22 years ago | |
| Bidvest Protea Coin | Security | Centurion, Gauteng | 2013; 13 years ago | 2013; 13 years ago | |
| Bidvest Tank Terminals | Bulk storage | Durban, KwaZulu-Natal | 1953; 73 years ago | 1999; 27 years ago | |
| Plumblink | Plumbing products | Sandton, Gauteng | 1989; 37 years ago | 2015; 11 years ago | |
| Rennies Travel | Travel services | Johannesburg, Gauteng | 1954; 72 years ago | 1998; 28 years ago | |
| Voltex | Electrical products | Johannesburg, Gauteng | 1964; 62 years ago | 2002; 24 years ago | |
| Waltons | Office products | Johannesburg, Gauteng | 1948; 78 years ago | 1997; 29 years ago | |
| Bidvest Noonan | Facilities management | Dublin, Ireland | 1977; 49 years ago | 2018; 8 years ago | |
| PHS Group | Hygiene services | Manchester, England | 1963; 63 years ago | 2020; 6 years ago | |
| Bidvest Facilities Management | Facilities management | Johannesburg, Gauteng | 2009; 17 years ago | – | |
| Bidvest Afcom | Packaging and fastening | Johannesburg, Gauteng | 1989; 37 years ago | 1989; 37 years ago | |
