= Garden Township, Lusaka =

Garden Township
- City neighborhood
- Location in Zambia
- Coordinates: 15°23′16″S 28°17′41″E
- Country: Zambia
- Province: Lusaka

Garden Township, is a neighborhood in the city of Lusaka, the capital of Zambia.

== Location ==
The neighborhood is bounded to the west by the T2 road (Great North Road) which stretches to Kabwe to the north and Chilanga to the south. To the northwest lies the neighborhoods of Chaisa and Mutambe. To the north the boundary is Kasangula Road. To the east is the more affluent neighborhood of Olympia Park. To the south, the boundaries are, from west to east; Makishi Road, the neighborhood of Chilulu and Manchinchi Road. The coordinates of Garden Township are: 15°23'16.0"S, 28°17'40.9"E (Latitude:-15.387767; Longitude:28.294726).

== Overview ==
Garden Township, Lusaka is a mixed income (low, middle and high income) neighborhood. Katima Mulilo Road, which runs from west to east through the neighborhood, divides the neighborhood into the north section and the south section. There are two large sewage ponds, one in each section of the neighborhood. AB Bank Zambia maintains a branch in the neighborhood.

== See also ==
- Lusaka
- List of banks in Zambia
