= Zambia Industrial Commercial Bank =

Zambian commercial bank

- Company type: Parastatal
- Industry: Financial services
- Founded: October 23, 2018; 7 years ago
- Headquarters: Lusaka, Zambia
- Key people: Charles Sichangwa; Chairman; Ignatius Mwanza; Managing Director
- Products: Loans, Checking, Savings, Investments, Debit Cards
- Website: Homepage

Zambia Industrial Commercial Bank (ZICB), is a commercial bank in Zambia. The bank is one of the commercial banks licensed by the Bank of Zambia, the central bank and national banking regulator.

== History ==
In November 2016, the Bank of Zambia took possession of the Intermarket Banking Corporation Zambia Limited, a commercial bank, which had become insolvent and unable to meet its financial obligations. In February 2017, the central bank announced that it would re-structure Intermarket Bank, to enable it to re-open.

Subsequently, agreement was reached with the shareholders of the collapsed bank, on how the bank could be re-opened. The National Pension Scheme Authority (NAPSA), a depositor in the collapsed bank opted to convert its ZMW50 million (approximately US$3.5 million) into equity in the restructured institution.

The restructured bank opened for business on 23 October 2018, in Lusaka, Zambia's capital city, with new shareholders and under new management, in a ceremony presided over by the then Minister of Finance, Margaret Mwanakatwe. The restructured bank was named Zambia Industrial Commercial Bank.

== Ownership ==
As of February 2020, the bank's stock was owned by the following corporate entities:

Zambia Industrial and Commercial Bank Stock Ownership
Rank	Name of Owner	Percentage Ownership
1	Industrial Development Corporation of Zambia	71.0
2	The National Pension Scheme Authority (NAPSA)	
3	Madison Finance Company Limited (MFinance)	
4	Workers' Compensation Fund Control Board of Zambia	
	Total	100.00

== Branch network ==
As of November 2019, the bank maintained a network of branches in the cities of Lusaka, the capital and Kitwe, in the Copperbelt Province.

== Governance ==
The chairman of the seven-person board of directors is Charles Sichangwa. The managing director is Ignatius Mwanza.

== See also ==
- Intermarket Bank
- List of banks in Zambia
- Economy of Zambia
