= Zambia National Commercial Bank =

Commercial bank in Zambia

Coordinates: 15°25′25″S 28°17′00″E

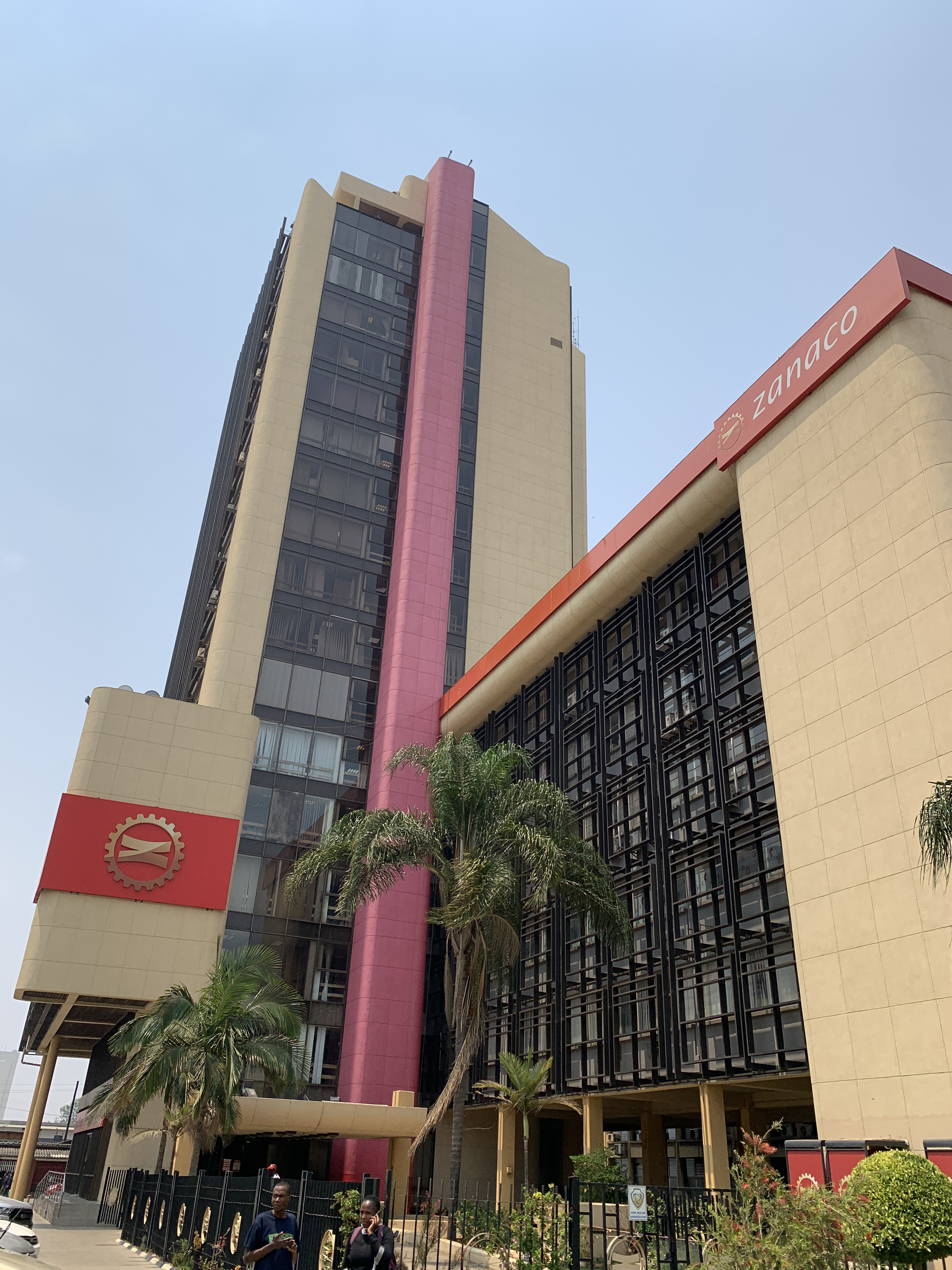
- Type: Public
- Traded as: LUSE:ZANACO
- Industry: Banking; Financial services
- Founded: January 1, 1969; 57 years ago
- Headquarters: Lusaka, Zambia
- Key people: Patrick Wanjelani; Chairman; Mukwandi Chibesakunda; Chief Executive Officer
- Products: Corporate and Investment Banking, Business Banking, Retail Banking, Digital Banking, Private Banking
- Operating income: ▲ZMW3.902 billion (US$213.60 million) (2022)
- Net income: ▲ZMW:1.204 billion (US$65.907 million) (2022)
- Total assets: ▲ZMW:35.97 billion (US$1.97 billion) (2022)
- Total equity: ▲ZMW2.980 billion (US$163.12 million) (2022)
- Number of employees: 1,216 (2022)
- Website: Homepage

Zambia National Commercial Bank, commonly referred to by the name "Zanaco", is a commercial bank in Zambia. It is licensed by Bank of Zambia, the central bank and national banking regulator. In 2021, Zanaco became the first bank in Zambia to register ZMW1bn in profit after tax.

== Location ==
The bank's headquarters and main branch are located in Zanaco House, at the corner of Cairo Road and Chainda Place, in the central business district of Lusaka, the capital and largest city in Zambia. The address is 2118–2121 Cairo Road, Lusaka, Zambia. The coordinates of the bank's headquarters are: 15°25'25.0"S, 28°17'00.0"E (Latitude:-15.423611; Longitude:28.283333).

== History ==
Zanaco was founded in 1969 by the Government of Zambia. Prior to 2007, the bank was 100 percent owned by the government. In that year, 49 percent of its shares were sold to the Rabobank Group, a banking company from the Netherlands. In 2008, the shares of Zanaco were listed on the Lusaka Stock Exchange (LUSE), where they trade under the symbol: (ZANACO). According to the bank's quarterly financial statements as of 30 June 2022, net income was ZMW29.42m. The current shareholding in the bank is detailed under ownership.

== Overview ==
Zanaco is one of the largest financial services providers in Zambia. As of December 2022, the bank's total assets were valued at ZMW35.97 billion (US$1.97 billion) with shareholders' equity of ZMW2.980 billion (US$163.12 million). In 2021, the Bank attained a historical milestone when it became the first Zambian Bank to record ZMW1 billion in profit after tax. The achievement was mainly attributed to accelerated revenue from initiatives from both funded and non-funded opportunities coupled with a successful realization of a cost containment framework.

The bank repeated the feat in 2022 when it registered PAT of ZMW1.203 billion after 11% growth in revenue following the implementation of various strategic initiatives such as embedding of sustainability into strategic plans and initiatives, expansion of product offering to match customer needs, improvement of customer touch points to enhance service delivery and expansion of the bank's digital footprint.

In October 2022, the bank secured a US$ 50.0 million credit line with British International Investment Company for onward lending to the small and medium-sized businesses and green financing.

== Awards in 2022 ==
The Bank received the following awards in 2022:

- Best Private Bank in Zambia Award, by International Finance Awards
- Best Bank in Zambia Award, by Euromoney
- Best Retail Bank in Zambia, by Global Banking and Finance
- Best Products of the Year for SME, Gender, and Children, at the Inaugural Banking & Finance Awards, by the Zambia Institute of Banking and Financial Services
- Best Banking App Award, by Zambia E-Commerce Awards
- Sustainability Award, Corporate Governance Award, by Lusaka Securities Exchange
- Omni-Channel Excellence Award, by the Chartered Institute of Customer Management
- Bank of the Year Award, by Kitwe and District Chamber of Commerce and Industry
- Best Commercial Exhibit, Best Banking Exhibit, Second Place - Best LuSE Company Exhibit, at the Agricultural Commercial Show
- Best Sponsorship Marketing Excellence of the Year, Most Creative Outdoor Advertisement, by the Zambia Institute of Marketing

== Ownership ==
As of December 2022, the banks's stock was owned by the following corporate entities and individuals:

Zanaco Stock Ownership
Rank	Name of Owner	Percentage Ownership
1	Arise BV*	45.59
2	Industrial Development Corporation (IDC)	25.00
3	Public	19.41
4	National Pension Scheme Authority (NAPSA)	10.00
	TOTAL	100.00

∗Arise BV is an investment company co-owned by Rabobank, Netherlands Development Finance Company and Norfund.

== Branch Network ==
Zanaco's main branch is located at the bank's headquarters in Lusaka, Zambia's capital and largest city. As of December 2022, the bank had one of the largest distribution networks in the country with 62 branches and agencies and almost 200 automated teller machines, spread across the entire country. In addition, Zanaco has over 21,000 Zanaco Xpress agents, a partnership which allows Zanaco customers to deposit and withdraw funds from their accounts in both rural and urban locales.

== Community service ==
Zanaco is the sponsor of Zanaco FC, a football club based in Lusaka, the capital city of Zambia.

== See also ==
- List of banks in Zambia
- Economy of Zambia
