= Atlas Mara Bank Zambia Limited =

Zambian bank

Coordinates: 15°25′08″S 28°18′02″E

- Type: Private
- Industry: Financial services
- Founded: December 1, 2016; 9 years ago
- Headquarters: Lusaka, Zambia
- Key people: Mary Ncube (chairperson); James Koni (Managing Director & CEO)
- Products: Loans, Checking, Savings, Investments, Debit Cards
- Revenue: ▲ Aftertax:
- Total assets: US$616 million (2016)
- Owner: Atlas Mara; (2016-24); Access Bank Group; (2024–present)
- Number of employees: 831 (2019)
- Website: Homepage

Atlas Mara Bank Zambia Limited (AMBZL), commonly referred to as Atlas Mara Zambia, is a commercial bank in Zambia. Established on December 1, 2016 from the merger of BancABC Zambia Ltd. with Finance Bank Zambia Ltd., it is licensed by the Bank of Zambia, the central bank and national banking regulator.

On January 8, 2024, Access Bank Group announced that it had completed the purchase of Atlas Mara Zambia and that it would merge its operations with the already established Access Bank Zambia.

== Location ==
The headquarters of the bank and its main branch, are located in Atlas Mara House, at the corner of Church Road and Nasser Road, in the city of Lusaka, the capital and largest city of Zambia. The coordinates of the bank's headquarters are: 15°25'08.0"S, 28°18'02.0"E (Latitude:-15.418889; Longitude:28.300556).

== Overview ==
Atlas Mara Bank is a large retail bank serving individuals, small and medium sized enterprises, large corporations and government departments across Zambia. As of December 2016, the bank controlled US$616 million in assets. At that time its branch network totaled 65 full branches, 24 agencies and 177 automated teller machines. Then, it was the fifth largest bank in Zambia by asset value.

== History ==
BancABC Zambia Limited was established in the early 2000s, as part of the BancABC conglomerate. In August 2015, Atlas Mara acquired 100 percent shareholding in BancABC.

Finance Bank Zambia Limited was established in 1986, having acquired a banking license from the Bank of Zambia. Its registered offices and main branch were located in Ndola, Zambia.

In November 2015 Atlas Mara, the parent of BancABC Zambia Limited, declared their intentions to acquire 100 percent shareholding in Finance Bank Zambia via stock and cash. The acquisition required regulatory approval.

On 1 July 2016, Atlas Mara completed the acquisition of FBZ Limited, for US$61 million in cash, 3.3 million shares of Atlas Mara stock and a deferred contingent consideration of up to 1.3 million shares. Atlas Mara announced that they planned to merge both FBZ Limited, which they had just acquired, with BancABC Zambia, which they already owned.

In 2021, Access Bank Zambia announced its intentions to merge with Atlas Mara and the acquisition and merge was completed in 2024.

== Branch Network ==
As of December 2016, Atlas Mara Bank Zambia, maintained a main office and a network of 65 stand-alone branches and 24 agencies, in all major metropolitan areas of Zambia.

== See also ==
- List of banks in Zambia
- Bank of Zambia
- Economy of Zambia
