= Tukiya Kankasa-Mabula =

Zambian lawyer

- Born: Zambia
- Citizenship: Zambia
- Education: Bachelor of Laws (LLB); University of Zambia; Lusaka, Zambia; Master of Laws (LLM); Harvard University; Cambridge, Massachusetts, United States; Doctor of Philosophy (PhD); University of London; London, United Kingdom
- Occupations: Deputy Governor, Administration; Bank of Zambia
- Years active: 1988 — present
- Known for: Administration, Gender Issues Advocacy
- Title: Deputy Governor, Administration

Tukiya Kankasa-Mabula, sometimes Tukiya Kankasa Mabula, is a Zambian lawyer, educator, administrator and gender issues advocate. She served as the deputy governor, administration at the Bank of Zambia (BoZ), till 15 December 2019. She was replaced by Rhekha Mhango, the former head of the Human Resource Department at the central bank, the country's central bank and national banking regulator. She was appointed to that position in 2007, by Levy Mwanawasa, the president of Zambia at that time, replacing Felix Mfula, who retired.

== History ==
Kankasa-Mabula is a native of Zambia. Following her education in Lusaka, Cambridge, Massachusetts and London, she returned to her alma mater, the University of Zambia, Faculty of Law, where she taught commercial law. For a period of time, she worked as director of licensing and enforcement at the Zambian Securities and Exchange Commission. In 1998, she joined the Bank of Zambia, as the bank's secretary and chief legal advisor. She served in that capacity for nine years, before being appointed to her current position.

== Overview ==
Kankasa-Mabula is a respected attorney, educator, administrator, businesswoman and gender issues advocate. In March 2014, she was a panellist on a televised discussion among the 100 most influential women in Zambia. The discussion was featured on CNBC's Africa Service on Monday, 31 March 2014.

In April 2014, she was selected as the recipient of the International Bar Association's 2014 Outstanding International Woman Lawyer Award. The award was given "in recognition of professional excellence, influencing other women to pursue careers in law, and advancing opportunities for women within the legal profession". The IBA Outstanding International Woman Lawyer Award is given every other year and is sponsored by LexisNexis. It includes a donation of US$5,000 to a charity of the winner's choice. The 2014 award presentation ceremony took place during the IBA 6th World Women Lawyers’ Conference, held from 8 to 9 May 2014 in Paris, France.

== Education ==
She holds the degree of Bachelor of Laws obtained from the University of Zambia, in Lusaka. She also holds the degree of Master of Laws obtained from Harvard University, in Cambridge, Massachusetts, United States. Her Doctor of Philosophy in law was obtained from the University of London, in the United Kingdom.

== Other responsibilities ==
Kankasa-Mabula is the current vice chairperson of the Council of the University of Zambia. She also serves as the chairperson of the Legal Steering Committee of the Committee of Central Bank Governors (CCBG) in Southern African Development Community (SADC).

== Photos ==
- Kankasa-Mabula in 2014 at ibanet.org
- Kankasa-Mabula (right) With Zambia's First Lady Thandiwe Banda (left) at State House, Lusaka at lusakatimes.com

== See also ==
- List of banks in Zambia
- Bank of Zambia
