= FBZ =

FBZ may refer to:

- Butzbach station, a railway station in Hesse, Germany
- Finance Bank Zambia Limited, now merged into Atlas Mara Bank Zambia Limited
- Flybondi, an Argentine airline
- .fbz, a file extension used by FictionBook
