= Access Bank Zambia =

Commercial bank in Zambia

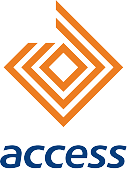
- Type: Subsidiary of Access Bank Group
- Industry: Financial services
- Founded: September 24, 2008; 18 years ago
- Headquarters: Lusaka, Zambia
- Key people: Caleb Amos Mulenga; Chairman; Lishala Situmbeko; Managing Director and CEO
- Products: Loans, Checking, Savings, Investments, Debit Cards
- Revenue: ▲ZMW:62,955,000 (US$5.667 million) (Q4:2022)
- Total assets: ZMW:5,869,391,000 (US$528.24 million) (Q4:2022)
- Website: Homepage

Access Bank Zambia, whose full name is Access Bank Zambia Limited, is a commercial bank in Zambia. It is licensed by the Bank of Zambia, the central bank and national banking regulator.

== Location ==
The headquarters and main branch of Access Bank Zambia are located at 632 Cairo Road, in the city Lusaka, the capital city of Zambia. The geographical coordinates of the headquarters of Access Bank Zambia are: 15°24'43.0"S, 28°16'49.0"E (Latitude:-15.411944; Longitude:28.280278).

== Access Bank Group ==
By virtue of its shareholding, Access Bank Zambia is a member of the Access Bank Group, a financial services conglomerate, whose shares are listed on the Nigerian Stock Exchange and whose total asset valuation exceeded US$18.82 billion (NGN:7.28 trillion), as of June 2020.

The group has banking subsidiaries in Democratic Republic of the Congo, Gambia, Ghana, Kenya, Nigeria, Rwanda, Sierra Leone and the United Kingdom. The group maintains representative offices in Lebanon, United Arab Emirates, India and China.

== Acquisition of Cavmont Bank ==
In August 2020 Access Bank Zambia entered into a binding commitment to acquire the entire issued ordinary share capital, assets and liabilities of Cavmont Bank, another Zambian commercial bank. The transaction, which requires regulatory and shareholder approval, is expected to close in Q4 of 2020.

== Merger with Atlas Mara Bank Zambia ==
In October 2021, Access Bank Zambia signed binding agreements to merge with Atlas Mara Bank Zambia Limited. The transaction which requires regulatory approval in Nigeria and Zambia, is expected to conclude in 2022. The merger of Access Bank Zambia and Cavmont Bank was concluded in 2000.

It is anticipated that when the merger with Atlas Mara Bank Zambia is concluded, Access Bank Zambia's total assets will exceed US$1 billion, with over 300,000 customer accounts and 70 branches and baking agencies.

== See also ==
- List of banks in Zambia
- Bank of Zambia
- Access Bank Rwanda
