= Access Bank Tanzania =

Commercial bank in Tanzania

Coordinates: 06°48′38″S 39°17′10.5″E

- Company type: Private: Subsidiary of Access Bank Group
- Industry: Financial services
- Founded: 1996; 30 years ago
- Headquarters: 5th & 6th Floor; Uhuru Heights; Bibi Titi Mohammed Road; Dar es Salaam
- Key people: John Imani Bgoya; Managing Director
- Products: Loans, savings
- Website: bancabc.co.tz

Access Bank Tanzania (ABT), formerly BancABC Tanzania, is a commercial bank in Tanzania. It is licensed by the Bank of Tanzania, the central bank and national banking regulator.

== Location ==
The headquarters of ABT are located on the 5th and 6th Floors, at Uhuru Heights, along Bibi Titi Mohammed Road in the city of Dar es Salaam, the financial capital and largest city in Tanzania. The coordinates of the bank's headquarters are 06°48'38.0"S, 39°17'10.5"E (Latitude:-6.810556; Longitude:39.286250).

== History ==
In 1996, the company started business operations as an asset financing institution. At that time, the shareholders included CDC Capital Partners (CDC), International Finance Corporation (IFC), Tanzania Development Finance Company Limited (TDFL) and the Union Dominions Corporation (UDC). UDC subsequently merged with First Merchant Bank and BARD Investment Services, and thereafter re-branded as "African Banking Corporation". The bank in Tanzania was granted full commercial banking status by the Bank of Tanzania in 2002, under the name African Banking Corporation Tanzania (BancABC Tanzania). BancABC operated as a merchant bank since 2002 and introduced retail banking operations in 2008. In 2004, the ABCH Group acquired 68 percent shareholding in TDFL, with the Government of Tanzania retaining the remaining 32 percent ownership. The international shareholders, including IFC, CDC, DEG, FMO and EIB were paid off.

In June 2024 Access Bank Group, acquired a majority stake in the bank, buying out the shareholding formerly own owned by Atlas Mara Limited. The transaction was concluded in Q3 2024 and BancABC Tanzania rebranded to Access Bank Tanzania. It is expected that the owners will merge the bank with the parts of Standard Chartered Tanzania that they are in the process of acquiring.

== Ownership ==
Access Bank Tanzania is majority owned by Access Bank Group (ABG), headquartered in Lagos Nigeria, with over 20 banking subsidiaries in Africa, the Middle East and Europe. As of October 2024, ABG controlled 97 percent of the Tanzanian subsidiary.

== Branch network ==
As of June 2026, ABT maintained a network of interconnected branches at the following locations:

1. Head Office: 5th & 6th Floor, Uhuru Heights, Bibi Titi Mohammed Road, Dar es Salaam
2. Uhuru Heights Branch: Bibi Titi Mohammed Road, Dar es Salaam
3. Kariakoo Branch: Msimbazi Street, Dar es Salaam
4. Arusha Branch: 14 & 15, Block "J", Swahili Street, Arusha
5. Tegeta Branch: Ground Floor & 2nd Floor, GDB House, 2040 Block H, Tegeta, Dar es Salaam
6. Mwanza Branch: 140 Pamba Road & Mitimirefu Street, Mwanza
7. Dodoma Branch: 15731 Block "N", Lindi Avenue & Mtendeni Street, Dodoma.

== Governance ==
The managing director/ceo of the bank as of June 2026, is John Imani.

== See also ==
- List of banks in Africa
- List of banks in Tanzania
