= Bidvest McCarthy =

South African non-manufacturing automotive company

McCarthy Pty Ltd

- Trade name: Bidvest McCarthy
- Formerly: McCarthy Motor Holdings
- Type: Subsidiary
- Industry: Automotive
- Incorporated: 1991; 35 years ago
- Founded: 1910; 116 years ago
- Headquarters: Sandton, Gauteng, South Africa
- Number of locations: 100+ dealerships (2026)
- Area served: South Africa and Namibia
- Key people: Carla Seppings (CEO of Bidvest Automotive)
- Products: Passenger vehicles Commercial vehicles
- Services: Vehicle servicing Auctions; Vehicle insurance Fleet services
- Parent: Bidvest Group (since 2004)
- Website: mccarthy.co.za

Bidvest McCarthy, officially McCarthy Pty Ltd, is a South African non-manufacturing automotive group, headquartered in Sandton, Gauteng. Founded in 1910, the company has been a subsidiary of South African diversified investment firm Bidvest Group since 2004.

As of 2026, the company operates under the Bidvest McCarthy, Bidvest McCarthy Pre-Owned, and Bidvest Club McCarthy brands. It operates more than 100 dealerships across South Africa and Namibia, retailing new and pre-owned passenger and commercial vehicles, as well as providing vehicle servicing, parts, and related automotive services.

== History ==
=== Early history ===
The company's origins date to 1910, when English immigrant Gilbert Rodway established the Coventry & Birmingham Motor & Cycle Company, a bicycle and engine business in Durban, KwaZulu-Natal. Around 1920, Rodway merged the business with Fisher & Simmons, and the resulting Fisher, Simmons, & Rodway (FSR) business acquired the Auburn automobile franchise.

Justin McCarthy joined the company as an accounts clerk in 1921 and subsequently acquired shares in the business. The company added a Dodge franchise in 1923, and later established relationships with international manufacturers, including Morris.

FSR was listed on the London Stock Exchange in 1936 and on the Johannesburg Stock Exchange in 1937.

In 1963, McCarthy sold its engine assembly business to Toyota South Africa, a move that strengthened its relationship with Toyota.

In 1966, McCarthy acquired a substantial portion of Atkinson-Oates, a national vehicle distributor and retailer, completing the acquisition of the remaining shares in 1975. The company subsequently continued expanding its motor-retailing operations and franchises.

=== Diversification and restructuring ===
During the 1980s and 1990s, McCarthy expanded itsvehicle retailing operations, adding new franchises and brands while investing in technology and operational efficiencies. The company experienced substantial growth in sales, turnover, assets, and employment during this period, but experienced financial difficulties in the late 1990s.

In 1999, McCarthy Limited was declared technically insolvent. Brand Pretorius, who had joined McCarthy Motor Holdings as CEO in 1995, became the CEO of McCarthy Limited, and oversaw a restructuring. Non-core businesses were sold, the company was recapitalized, and its lenders subsequently took control of the group. Thereafter, it became profitable again.

In 2001, a consortium of banks acquired control of McCarthy through a recapitalization. Major South African diversified investment company Bidvest Group subsequently agreed to acquire the company in November 2003, subject to regulatory and manufacturer approvals.

=== Acquisition by Bidvest ===
Bidvest Group completed its acquisition of McCarthy on 1 January 2004, for approximately R967 million. McCarthy then formed part of the Bidvest Automotive division.

By the time of Bidvest's acquisition in 2004, McCarthy's operations extended beyond vehicle retailing to include financial services, vehicle rental through Budget Rent-a-Car, vehicle auctioneering through Burchmores, corporate and commercial fleet management, and the importation and distribution of Yamaha products.

By 2005, Yamaha Distributors' business were importing products including motorcycles, ATVs, boats, outboard motors, and industrial equipment. By 2006, McCarthy had added Yamaha Intelligent Machinery (robotics) to the portfolio.

McCarthy Motor Group's CEO, Brand Pretorius, retired in March 2011, after 16 years with the company. At the time of his retirement, McCarthy had 116 wholly owned dealerships and over 6,500 employees.

=== Recent developments ===
By 2018, McCarthy's dealership network had significantly decreased in size. It operated a total of 83 dealerships, representing 26 vehicle brands.

During 2023 and 2024, McCarthy broadened its franchise portfolio, adding brands including Suzuki, Jetour, Mahindra, FAW, GAC, and LDV. Bidvest described the changes as part of a strategy to diversify McCarthy's brand portfolio and better align it with changing consumer demand.

== Operations ==
As of 2026, Bidvest McCarthy operates under three divisions – Bidvest McCarthy, Bidvest McCarthy Pre-Owned, and Bidvest Club McCarthy. The company has over 100 dealerships across South Africa and Namibia.

=== Brands ===
In 2026, McCarthy retailed the following brands in South Africa:

- Audi
- BAIC
- BYD
- Citroën
- Fiat
- Ford
- Foton
- GAC
- Geely
- GWM
- Haval
- Isuzu
- JAC
- Jeep
- Jetour
- JMC
- Leapmotor
- Mahindra
- Mercedes-Benz
- MG Motor
- Mitsubishi Motors
- Nissan
- Opel
- Peugeot
- Renault
- Suzuki
- Toyota
- Volkswagen

== See also ==
- Automotive industry in South Africa
