= List of banks in Zambia =

This is a list of commercial banks in Zambia, as updated late 2024 by the Bank of Zambia.

== List of commercial banks ==
- AB Bank Zambia Ltd, part of AccessHolding Group
- Absa Bank Zambia Ltd, part of Absa Group
- Access Bank Zambia Ltd, part of Access Bank Group
- Bank of China (Zambia) Ltd (BOC), part of Bank of China Group
- Citibank Zambia Ltd, part of Citigroup
- Ecobank Zambia Ltd, part of Ecobank Group
- First Alliance Bank Zambia Ltd (FAB)
- First Capital Bank Zambia Ltd (FCB), part of First Capital Bank Group
- First National Bank Zambia Ltd (FNB), part of FirstRand Group
- Indo-Zambia Bank Ltd
- Stanbic Bank Zambia Ltd, part of Standard Bank Group
- Standard Chartered Zambia, part of Standard Chartered Group
- United Bank for Africa Zambia Ltd (UBA), part of UBA Group
- Zambia Industrial Commercial Bank Plc (ZICB)
- Zambia National Commercial Bank Plc (Zanaco)

== See also ==
- Atlas Mara Bank Zambia Limited
- Investrust Bank
- List of banks in Africa
