= AccessBank Tajikistan =

Bank in Tajikistan

- Type: CJSC (Private/Cooperative)
- Industry: Banking
- Founded: 2010
- Defunct: 2019
- Headquarters: Dushanbe, Tajikistan
- Key people: Katharina Sсhaсhtner, Chairman; Kasimova Dilovar Qurbonalievna, Chief Accountant
- Website: www.accessbank.tj/en

AccessBank Tajikistan is a mid-size bank in Tajikistan. The bank is currently led by chairman Katharina Sсhaсhtner.

AccessBank was established with the financial support of a number of European development banks and is 100% foreign-owned, including shareholders Access Microfinance Holding AG (63.429%), European Bank for Reconstruction and Development – (13.714%), International Finance Corporation – (13.714%) and KfW Development Bank – (9.143%).

In 2019, AccessBank Tajikistan joined the Bank Arvand.
