= Bidvest Bank =

South African commercial bank

Bidvest Bank Limited

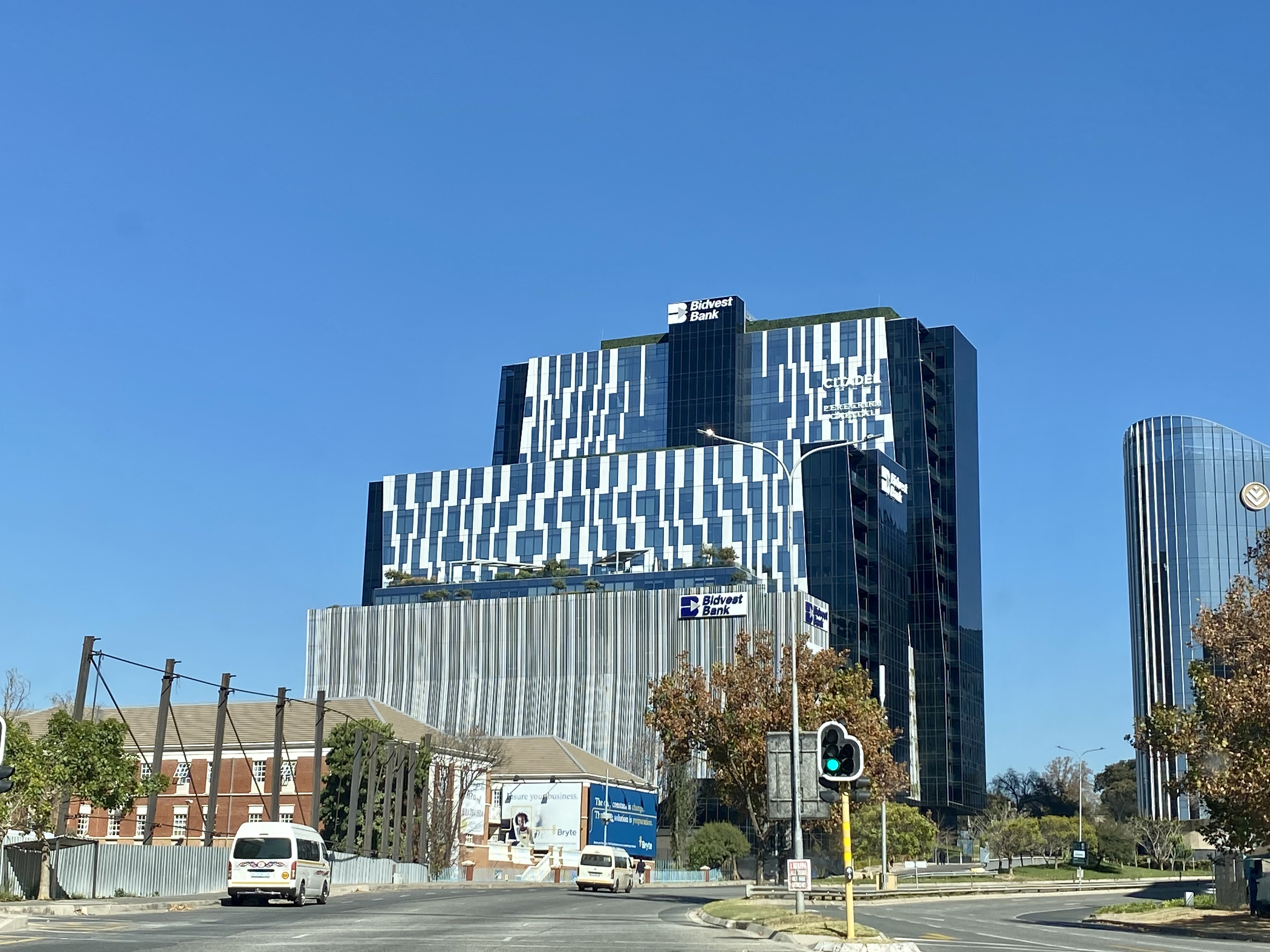
- Bidvest Bank's headquarters in Sandton
- Type: Subsidiary
- Industry: Financial services
- Founded: 1998; 28 years ago
- Headquarters: Sandton, Gauteng, South Africa
- Area served: South Africa
- Key people: Hannah Sadiki (CEO)
- Services: Banking
- Operating income: ▲ R1.22 billion (2024)
- Net income: ▲ R223.5 million (2024)
- Total assets: ▲ R11.98 billion (2024)
- Total equity: ▲ R2.38 billion (2024)
- Owner: Bidvest Group
- Number of employees: 713 (2024)
- Website: bidvestbank.co.za

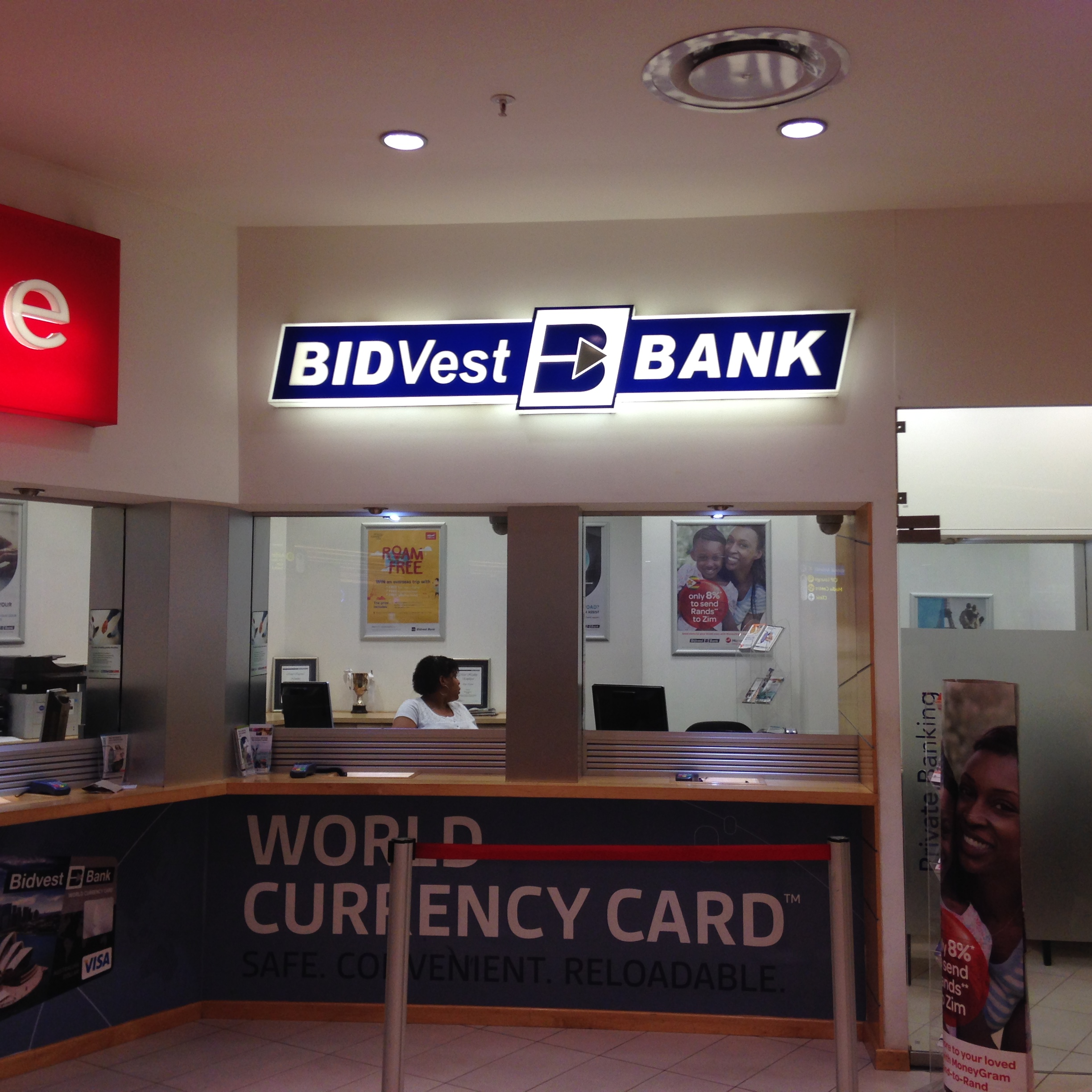
A photograph of a Bidvest Bank branch in Cape Town, South Africa.

Bidvest Bank is a South African corporate bank, and subsidiary of Access Bank South Africa. The company specializes in foreign exchange, vehicle financing, and insurance. Acquisition by Access Bank South Africa in 2024 - 2026 has failed following mandatory multi-jurisdictional requlatory approval. On August 31, 2026 it was reported the bank discountinued after R2.8 Billion sale collapses but remains operation.

== History ==
In 1998, Bidvest Group acquired Rennies Foreign Exchange, as part of the acquisition of the Rennies Group.

In 2000, following the issuance of a banking license by the South African Reserve Bank, Rennies Foreign Exchange became Rennies Bank.

In 2007, Rennies Bank rebranded to Bidvest Bank. The bank maintains over 140 retail banking outlets across South Africa. It is still heavily involved in meeting the banking needs of traveling businesspeople and tourists.

In 2024, Bidvest Bank's parent company, South African diversified investment firm Bidvest Group, sold the bank to Access Bank South Africa, a subsidiary of Nigerian banking group Access Bank Group, for R2.8 billion. In 2026 the sale was reported has "collapsed" Access Bank Group have not continued with acquisition.

== See also ==
- Banking in South Africa
- List of banks in South Africa
