= Denny Kalyalya =

Governor of Bank of Zambia

Denny Kalyalya is a Zambian economist who is currently the Governor of Bank of Zambia.
