= Mpumi Madisa =

South African businesswoman

Nompumelelo Thembekile Madisa
- Born: 1979 (age 45–46); Mohlakeng, South Africa
- Other names: Mpumi Madisa
- Education: Wits University (BS, BCom, MS)
- Occupation(s): Businesswoman, CEO

Nompumelelo Thembekile Madisa (born 1979), known as Mpumi Madisa, is a South African businesswoman. On 8 March 2019, she became CEO-designate of Bidvest Group, the first black and African female to be appointed CEO of the Johannesburg Stock Exchange top 40 company, seen as signalling a new advancement in gender transformation in business in South Africa.

== Early life and education ==
Madisa was born in Mohlakeng, west of Gauteng in South Africa. She grew up in Sebokeng to the south of Johannesburg. She is one of four siblings. She had her primary and high school education at Sancta Maria Junior High and Mondeor High School respectively. She furthered at Wits University where she changed her major from a science course to mathematics, statistics and economics. She holds a bachelor's degree in economics and mathematics, a BComm honours degree in economics and a master's degree in finance and investment, all from the Wits University.

== Career ==
Right after completing her tertiary education, she was employed by Hollard Insurance as a trainee marketing assistant. She worked there for 18 months and then left to work at Prestige, a Bidvest subsidiary specialising in cleaning. At Prestige, she served as client relations manager, a position that was created for her and the beginning of a career trend. Three years later, she left Prestige to work in the public service where she was chief director of transformation at the Gauteng department of agriculture and rural development. On returning to Prestige, she served as corporate affairs director in charge of four departments and sales director. A few months later, she was promoted to work at the group level and was appointed to the Bidvest board. On 8 March 2019, she became the first woman to be appointed Chief Executive Officer of Bidvest Group, a position she assumed fully in July 2020.

== Awards and honors ==
- Madisa was ranked 94th on Fortune's list of Most Powerful Women in 2023
- Madisa was named Business Leader of the Year by the Sunday Times in 2023
- In 2023, she ranked 88th in Forbes list of "World's 100 most powerful women"

== Personal life ==
Madisa is married with one child.
