= Afriland First Bank =

Financial services institution in Cameroon

- Type: Joint stock
- Industry: Finance
- Founded: 1987
- Headquarters: 1063 Place de l'Indépendance; Yaoundé, Cameroon
- Key people: Jean Paulin FOUNKOUA; Chairman; Célestin GUELA SIMO; CEO
- Products: Financial services
- Revenue: ▲ Aftertax: €19,186,000 (2016)
- Total assets: €4.37 billion (2022)
- Website: http://www.afrilandfirstbank.com

Afriland First Group is a conglomerate comprising banks, an insurance company and investment advisory businesses. The group's headquarters are located in Switzerland with subsidiaries in the Ivory Coast, Democratic Republic of the Congo, Equatorial Guinea, Guinea, Liberia, South Sudan and São Tomé and Príncipe.
The flagship company of the group is Afriland First Bank in Cameroon, with headquarters in Yaoundé. The bank was founded in Yaoundé, Cameroon in 1987 under the name of Caisse Commune d'Epargne et d'Investissement. It is the largest financial services group in Cameroon.

== Overview ==
The Afriland First Bank in Cameroon is the largest financial services provider with Credit Contribution of XAF 1,037 Billion(€1.58 Billion) as of January 2023. The Group with its subsidiaries around the world had a combined asset base valued at €4.37 billion in December 2022.

== Subsidiaries ==
As of October 2019 the bank maintains subsidiaries in the following countries:

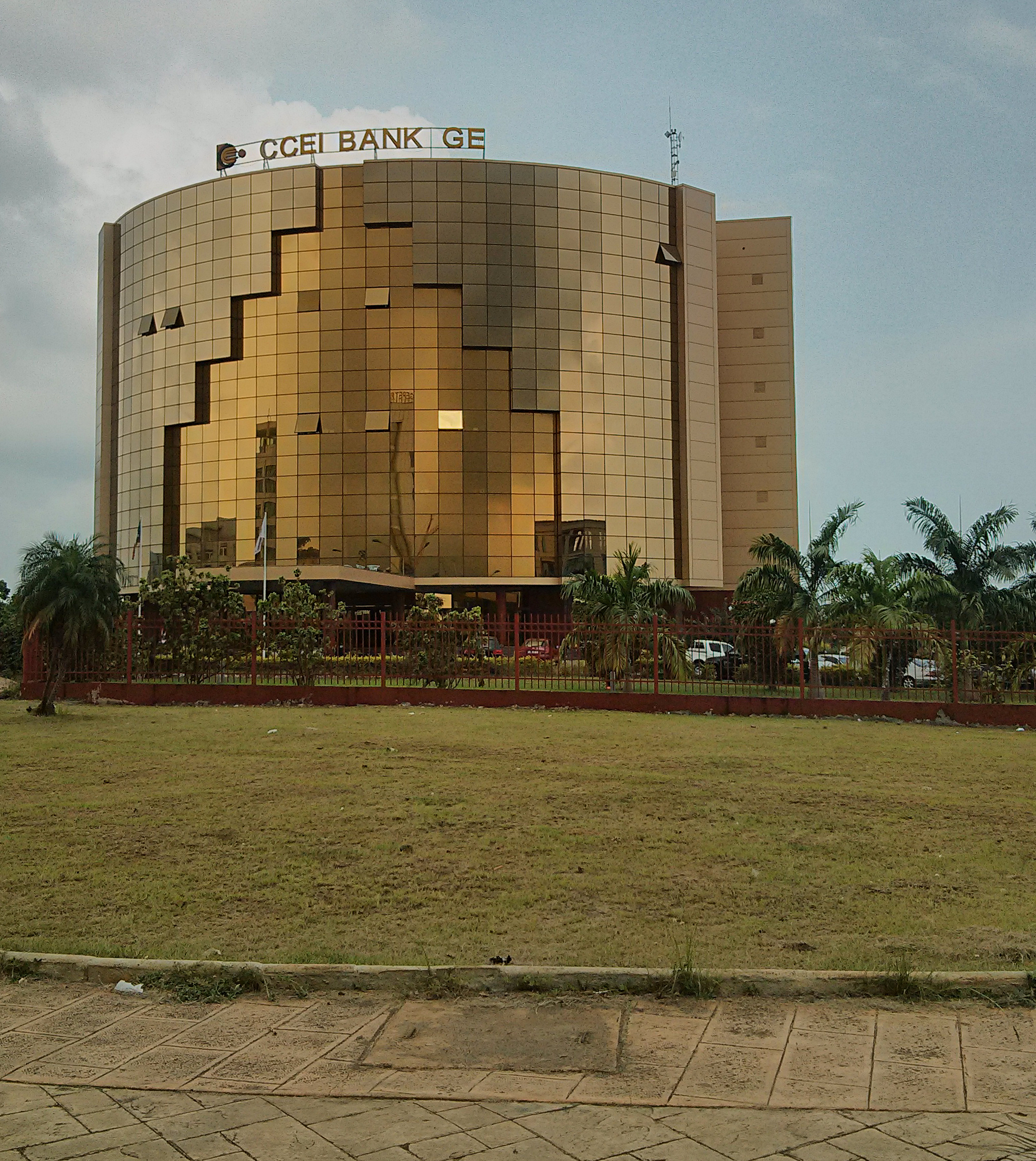
CCEI Bank headquarters in Malabo

- Equatorial Guinea - CCEI Bank GE
- São Tomé and Príncipe - First Bank São Tomé and Príncipe
- Democratic Republic of the Congo - Afriland First Bank DRC
- Liberia - Afriland First Bank Liberia
- South Sudan - Afriland First Bank South Sudan
- Guinea - Afriland First Bank Guinea
- Ivory Coast - Afriland First Bank Ivory Coast
- Zambia - Intermarket Bank (80 percent shareholding)

The banking group was granted a commercial banking license by the Bank of Uganda, in September 2019. After starting operations on 1 December 2020, the subsidiary voluntarily surrendered its banking license in May 2022, following a "strategic business review" by Afriland Group, who were the shareholders.

== Representative offices ==
In the following countries, the bank has representative offices only:

- Paris, France - Afriland First Bank Paris
- Beijing, China, - Afriland First Bank China
- Brazzaville, Republic of the Congo - Afriland First Bank Congo Brazzaville

== Branch Network ==
As of December 2024, the bank has over 90+ branches in Cameroon.

== See also ==
- List of banks in Cameroon
- Economy of Cameroon
- Yaoundé
