= Lwensinga =

- Location in Uganda
- Coordinates: 00°23′31″S 31°27′35″E
- Country: Uganda
- District: Lwengo District
- Sub-county: Lwengo sub-county
- Elevation: 4,124 ft (1,257 m)

Lwensinga is a town in the Buganda Region of Uganda.

== Location ==
The town is in Mbiriizi Parish, in Lwengo sub-county, Lwengo District. Lwensinga lies along the Masaka–Mbarara Road, approximately 34 kilometres (21 mi), west of Masaka, the nearest large city. This is approximately 168 kilometres (104 mi), by road, southwest of Kampala, the capital and largest city of Uganda. The geographical coordinates of Lwensinga are: 0°23'31.0"S, 31°27'35.0"E (Latitude:-0.391944; Longitude:31.459722). The town lies at an average elevation of 1,257 metres (4,124 ft), above sea level.

== Overview ==
Lwensinga is the southern terminus of the 37 kilometres (23 mi) Sembabule–Mateete–Lwensinga Road. Here, this road joins the Masaka–Mbarara Road, which passes through the town, in a general east to west direction. Finance Trust Bank, a commercial bank with headquarters in Kampala, maintains a branch in Lwensinga. The town is also home to Kyamaganda Health Centre II, owned and administered by the Uganda Catholic Medical Bureau.

== See also ==
- List of cities and towns in Uganda
