= Francis Nkhoma =

Zambian politician

Francis Xavier Nkhoma (c. 1937 – 15 May 2009) was a Zambian politician and the former governor of the Bank of Zambia (1987 – 1989). He briefly served as the President of the United National Independence Party between 2000 and 2001.
