= Mukwandi Chibesakunda =

Zambian accountant and bank executive

Chief Executive Officer Mukwandi Chibesakunda

CEO of Zambia National Commercial Bank
- Incumbent
- Assumed office 2020

Personal details
- Born: Mukwandi Walusiku Chibesakunda
- Spouse: Chita Chibesakunda
- Education: University of Zambia, Manchester Business School

Mukwandi Walusiku Chibesakunda is a Zambian accountant and bank executive who is chief executive officer of Zambia's largest bank, the Zambia National Commercial Bank. She is the first female to hold the position. In 2022, she won the African female leader of the year.

== Early life and education ==
Mukwandi has a postgraduate diploma in Business Administration from Manchester Business school in the United Kingdom (UK). She attended an International Credit Skills Assessment Programme at Omega performance in the UK. She is pursuing an MBA accelerated programme at Alliance Manchester Business school in the UK.

== Banking career ==
Chibesakunda joined the banking sector earlier in her life. Previously, she was President of the Zambia Institute of Banking and Financial services. She then served as managing director of NATSAVE, a government-owned Zambian financial institution. Later, she was appointed CEO of the Zambia National Commercial Bank, Zanaco.
