= Selcom Microfinance Bank Tanzania =

Microfinance bank in Tanzania

Coordinates: 06°46′37″S 39°14′45″E

Selcom Microfinance Bank Tanzania Limited
- Type: Private company
- Industry: Financial services
- Founded: November 21, 2007; 18 years ago
- Headquarters: Dar es Salaam, Tanzania
- Key people: Thomas Engelhardt (chairman); Julius Ruwaichi (chief executive officer)
- Products: Loans, checking, savings, investments, debit cards
- Revenue: ▲Aftertax: TSh 687 million (US$302,000) (June 2017)
- Total assets: TSh 207.2 billion (US$91 million) (June 2017)
- Owner: Selcom Tanzania (66.11%); IFC (13.06%); MicroVest (9.04%); KfW (6.73%); AfDB (5.06%);
- Number of employees: 634 (2018) 776 (2017)
- Website: www.smfb.co.tz

Selcom Microfinance Bank Tanzania (SMBT), previously known as Access Microfinance Bank Tanzania (AMBT), is a microfinance bank located in Tanzania. It is licensed by the Bank of Tanzania, the central bank and national banking regulator.

== Overview ==
SMFB is a Microfinance Bank that focuses on the micro-finance sector, serving micro, small and medium-sized enterprises. Access Microfinance Bank Tanzania was a member of the AccessBank Group, which is composed of microfinance institutions in Sub-Saharan Africa, Central Asia, and South America, who are majority owned by the AccessHolding conglomerate..Currently the bank is owned by Selcom Paytech Tanzania Limited and other minority shareholders who are very strong in the market.

In 2016, the bank served 225,928 savings clients, had 31,798 loan clients, 29 percent of whom were women, and 2 percent of all clients were rural based. As of 2017, the bank's total assets were valued at TSh 207.2 billion (US$91 million), with shareholders' equity of TSh 31.73 billion (US$14 million).

== Shareholding ==
As of 2016 the shareholding in the stock of the bank is illustrated in the table below:

AccessBank Tanzania stock ownership
Rank	Name of owner	Percentage ownership
1	AccessHolding	66.11
2	International Finance Corporation	13.06
3	MicroVest	9.04
4	KfW	6.73
5	African Development Bank	5.06
	Total	100.00

^{1 - "MicroVest is a private, for-profit investment group dedicated to reducing global poverty by applying a commercial framework to investing".}

In June 2024, Selcom Tanzania became the majority shareholder and the bank rebranded to reflect the new ownership.

Selcom Microfinance Bank Tanzania stock ownership
Rank	Name of owner	Percentage ownership
1	Selcom Tanzania Limited	90.00
2	African Development Bank	5.06
3	Minority shareholders	4.94
	Total	100.00

^{1 - "Selcom Tanzania is a private, fintech company".}

== Branches ==
As of July 2018, ABT maintained branches at the following locations:

1. Kijitonyama Branch - Derm House, New Bagamoyo Road, Kijitonyama, Dar es Salaam, main branch
2. Lumumba Branch - Summit Tower, Lumumba Road, Dar es Salaam
3. Temeke Branch - Temeke Street, Dar es Salaam
4. Mwanza (Pamba anza B)rh II - Kishimba Building, Pamba Road, Mwanza
5. Kahama Branch - Isaka Road, Kahama
6. Tabora Branch - NSSF Building, Jamhuri Road, Tabora
7. Mbeya Branch - Mbeya
8. Iringa Branch - Iringa

== Governance ==
Thomas Engelhardt serves as the chairman of the five-person board of directors. The managing director and CEO of the bank is Julius Ruwaichi.

== See also ==
- List of banks in Tanzania
