= AccessHolding =

German microfinance holding company

- Type: Joint Stock Company
- Industry: Development Finance
- Founded: 2006
- Headquarters: Berlin, Germany
- Key people: Thomas Engelhardt; Chairman
- Products: Equity Finance; Management Services
- Total assets: €1 billion (*network 2014)
- Website: Homepage

Access Microfinance Holding AG, often referred to as AccessHolding, is a commercial microfinance investment and holding company based in Germany. AccessHolding specializes in start-ups and early-stage microfinance institutions (MFIs). It will establish new MFIs together with other partners, and transform existing non-bank microlending institutions into full-service microfinance banks.

== Overview ==
AccessHolding is an investor and technical manager in a network of microfinance banks in developing and emerging countries. In 2012, the group banks' total assets were valued at approximately €1 billion, with shareholders' equity of about €170 million.

== History ==
The company was founded in August 2006 by LFS Financial Systems GmbH (LFS). LFS is a German business and financial consulting firm based in Berlin. It has special expertise in developing and emerging markets.

== AccessBank Group ==
The member banks of the AccessBank Group include the following:

1. AccessBank Azerbaijan - Baku, Azerbaijan - Total Assets:US$597.4 million (2012) (16.5% shareholding)
2. AccessBank Madagascar - Antananarivo, Madagascar - Total Assets:US$39.1 million (2012) (55.2% shareholding)
3. AccessBank Tanzania - Dar es Salaam, Tanzania - Total Assets:US$55.3 million (2012) (52.7% shareholding)
4. AB Microfinance Bank Nigeria - Lagos, Nigeria - Total Assets:US$42.2 million (2012) (50.1% shareholding)
5. AccessBank Liberia - Monrovia, Liberia - Total Assets:US$24.3 million (2012) (55.6% shareholding)
6. AccessBank Tajikistan - Dushanbe, Tajikistan - Total Assets:US$23.4 million (2012) (63.4% shareholding)
7. AB Bank Zambia - Lusaka, Zambia - Total Assets:US$8.3 million (2012) (51.0% shareholding)
8. AB Bank Rwanda - Kigali, Rwanda - Total Assets:US$5.54 million (2013) (50.5% shareholding)

== Ownership ==
As of December 2013, the company stock is privately owned by the following corporate entities:

AccessHolding Stock Ownership

Rank	Name of Owner	Percentage Ownership
1	LFS Financial Systems GmbH of Germany	18.63
2	CDC Group Plc. of United Kingdom	13.74
3	European Investment Bank	13.74
4	International Finance Corporation (IFC)	13.74
5	KfW Development Bank of Germany	13.74
6	The Omidyar-Tufts Microfinance Fund (OTMF)	13.74
7	FMO of the Netherlands	9.75
8	MicroAssets GbR of Germany	2.93
	Total	100.00

- MicroAssets GbR is the employee investment company owned by the staff of LFS Financial Systems GmbH.

== See also ==
- Development finance institution
