= The Natural Fibre Company =

The Natural Fibre Company (NFC) is a wool spinning mill based in Launceston, Cornwall, England, and is a small-scale full range textile mill in the UK.

The focus of the award-winning business is to add value to naturally coloured raw fleece which it processes on behalf of farmers, smallholders and rare sheep breeders providing a 'farm to yarn' and 'farm to finished product' journey. Through commission spinning work NFC provides support in the preservation of rare breed sheep, helping British farming and support for the wool industry.

It is one of a handful of unique mills in the UK that processes yarn in small quantities for craftspeople and smaller businesses, as well as being able to process up to a 1 tonne. Also working with British fashion brands. It is a member of MAKE UK, Campaign for Wool, Made in Britain, UKFT and Cornwall Manufacturing Group.

== Company history ==
The Natural Fibre Company has been spinning wool since 1991. Following its takeover and relocation to Cornwall in 2005, NFC launched its own brand of British wool knitting and crochet products called Blacker Yarns, exporting 40% of products to 26 countries with 13 partner stockists in the UK and worldwide.

Although the company was started in Merthyr Tydfil, Wales, by Myra Mortlock in 1991 to spin wool on a small scale, largely for smallholders, it was a continuation of a business bought from Rose Elworthy who had launched it in the mid-1980s.

With her husband Philip, Myra produced natural and undyed wool in the traditional way, later moving the business to an industrial unit at Lampeter in mid-Wales before selling it to Sue Blacker after the Mortlocks decided to retire in 2004.

Sue Blacker had a small flock of Gotland sheep and was a NFC customer. She approached other customers with a research survey to determine exactly what they wanted and put together a business plan approved for European Union Objective One funding in the spring of 2005.

NFC was taken over from the Mortlocks on 14 November 2005 and relocated to a 15,000 sq ft (1,400 m^{2}) factory at Launceston in Cornwall close to the Devon border. It received help from European Union Objective One funding, outside investors and fund managers Finance Cornwall. The business was bought in 2019 by Colin Spencer Halsey, the current owner and CEO.

== The company today ==
The Natural Fibre Company scours, cards and spins fibre on its woollen system, working in batches upwards of 25 kilos. It also operates a research and development house trialling less familiar blends such as dog hair, human hair and yak fibre with pure wool to make new yarn products for its customers and sold on its online shop. The mill waste is reused and repurposed into by-products such as raw hard waste, carded waste, noil waste and bobbin waste and sold for natural crafting, gardening and household use.

In addition to advising sheep owners how to get the best fibre from their flocks and turn it into a form they can sell, The Natural Fibre Company purchases wool from its customers for use in its own range of products, Blacker Yarns.

All the wool going through the mill is British and includes some from the Falklands Islands.
