= Annet Nakawunde Mulindwa =

Ugandan businesswoman and corporative executive

- Born: Annet Nakawunde; Uganda
- Education: Makerere University (Bachelor of Arts); Uganda Management Institute (Diploma in Financial Management) (Master of Business Administration)
- Occupations: Businesswoman & bank executive
- Years active: 1998–present
- Title: Managing director & CEO, Finance Trust Bank

Annet Nakawunde Mulindwa (née Annet Nakawunde) is a businesswoman and corporate executive in Uganda, the third-largest economy in the East African Community. She is the managing director and CEO of Finance Trust Bank, a financial service provider with assets valued at about US$92 million, as of 31 December 2020.

== Background and education ==
Mulindwa was born in the Central Region of Uganda circa 1960s. She studied at local primary and secondary schools before she entered Makerere University, the oldest and largest public university in the country. She graduated from Makerere with a Bachelor of Arts degree. She obtained a postgraduate diploma in financial management from the Uganda Management Institute (UMI) in Kampala. Later, she obtained a Master of Business Administration in finance, also from UMI.

== Career ==
In the early 1990s, Mulindwa started out at Pride Microfinance Limited and later moved to Nile Bank Limited, before joining Finance Trust Bank. At Finance Trust, she has worked in different capacities, including operations and compliance manager, and head of operations. Over time, she was recognized for her leadership skills and was offered further training in leadership, management, and problem-solving. On 3 April 2012, she was appointed as managing director and CEO of what was still known as Uganda Finance Trust, a microfinance institution. When the Bank of Uganda granted the Finance Trust a full commercial banking license, Mulindwa became the second woman in the banking history of the country to rise to the rank of CEO at a commercial bank in Uganda, behind Edigold Monday. The new commercial bank was launched officially in January 2014.
