= Belgian Investment Company for Developing Countries =

Private company, based in Brussels, Belgium

- Company type: Public-Private Enterprise
- Industry: Financial services
- Founded: 2001
- Headquarters: Brussels, Belgium
- Key people: Christophe Soil; Chairman; Luuk Zonneveld; Chief Executive Officer
- Products: Development finance, small and medium enterprise finance, export finance, import finance, foreign investment finance, development aid
- Revenue: ▲Aftertax:€75.3 million (2017)
- Total assets: €887.2 million (2017)
- Number of employees: 67 (2018)
- Website: bio-invest.be

Belgian Investment Company for Developing Countries (BIO), is a private company, based in Brussels, Belgium.

== Overview ==
BIO works to promote the creation of a strong private sector in emerging economies, to enable them gain access to prosperity and sustainable development. BIO invests directly in private sector projects. As of December 2017, the company's total asset base was valued at €712.9 million, consisting of €485.6 million in investments already funded and €227.3 million already committed but not yet disbursed.

== History ==
BIO was formed in 2001 to fund investment projects in developing and/or emerging countries. BIO invests to help those economies attain some of the Sustainable Development Goals. At the beginning, the company financed regional or local intermediary structures, such as banks and investment funds. This was done to limit BIO's risk, allowing the company to benefit from the experience of more seasoned institutions. In 2004, it broadened its mission to the direct support of local SMEs in order to compensate for the reluctance of commercial banks, which are generally hesitant to finance SME activities. In 2010, BIO’s scope of activities was widened to include the funding of private infrastructure.

== Ownership ==
The company was started as a 50-50 joint venture between the Government of Belgium and Société Belge d’Investissement International S.A., (Belgian Corporation for International Investment), also known as SBI-BMI. The initial shareholders' capital was €5 million. The Belgian Ministry for Development Cooperation provides further funding for onward lending. In 2014, the Belgian State acquired full shareholdership of BIO.

== Organisational structure ==
BIO is organised in three main divisions or sectors:

Financial Sector

Facilitates the support of microfinance institutions, commercial banks, non-bank financial institutions, investment companies and investment funds. The aim is to allow local SMEs to obtain long-term finance.

Local SMEs

Invests directly in local SMEs and large companies with a local presence, with focus on agribusiness, in all matters concerning food crops intended for local consumption and export. In addition, focus is also given to companies involved in breeding, the processing of raw food and value addition.

Infrastructure

Invests in private or public-private partnership projects, focusing on energy, water, telecommunications and transport infrastructure where the main purpose is to support the local private sector.

== International presence ==
The company is present in 52 countries in Africa, Asia and Latin America. Africa, where most of the funding activities of BIO are concentrated, accounts for 34% of the funding commitments of BIO.

== Partnerships ==
Since 2001, BIO has been a member of European Development Finance Institutions (EDFI), an association of 15 European bilateral Development Finance Institutions. Its mission is to foster cooperation among its members and to strengthen their relationship with the institutions of the European Union, principally with the European Commission and the European Investment Bank (EIB). BIO has a collaboration agreement with the Centre for the Development of Companies (CDE). This partnership aims to seek out, select and support entrepreneurs who need financing in the ACP countries. In addition BIO has joint funding arrangements with the International Finance Corporation and with the African Development Bank.

== See also ==
- Danish International Development Agency
- French Development Agency
- German Investment Corporation
- Netherlands Development Finance Company
