= Finance Trust Bank =

Financial institution in Uganda

Coordinates: 00°19′18″N 32°34′35″E

- Company type: Private
- Industry: Financial services
- Founded: 1984; 42 years ago
- Headquarters: TWED Plaza, Lumumba Avenue, Nakasero, Kampala, Uganda
- Key people: Evelyn Kigozi Kahiigi; Chairperson; Annet Nakawunde Mulindwa; CEO
- Products: Loans, savings
- Net income: ▲ (Aftertax) UGX:18.1 billion (US$4,890,359) (2025)
- Total assets: UGX:668 billion (US$180,483,980) (2025)
- Number of employees: 878 (2022)
- Website: financetrust.co.ug

Finance Trust Bank (FTB), commonly called Finance Trust, is a Tier II credit services company in Uganda. It was previously licensed as commercial bank by Bank of Uganda, the central bank and the national banking regulator of that country. The Bank of Uganda gave Finance Trust from 1 January 2026 until 31 March 2026 to transition from a Tier I commercial bank to a Tier II credit company, due to capitalization issues.

== Location ==
The headquarters of FTB are located at TWED Plaza, Lumumba Avenue, Nakasero, in the Central Division of Kampala, Uganda's capital city. The coordinates of the institution's headquarters are 0°19'18.0"N 32°34'35.0"E (Latitude:0.321667; Longitude:32.576389).

== History ==
FTB was founded in 1984 as Uganda Women's Finance Trust Limited. The objective was to provide financial services to low income people in Uganda, especially women. Sixty percent of the bank's customers are women. Subsequently, the institution rebranded to Uganda Finance Trust Limited, a Tier III financial institution, recognized as a microfinance deposit-taking institution under the supervision of the Bank of Uganda. On 11 November 2013, the Bank of Uganda granted the bank a full commercial banking license. The institution then rebranded to its current name.

== Overview ==
As of 31 December 2021, FTB serviced over 500,000 savers and over 29,000 borrowers through a network of 34 interconnected branches, located in all regions of the country. As of 31 December 2023, the bank's total assets were valued at UGX:465.47 billion (approx. US$126.6 million) with shareholders' equity of UGX:68.59 billion (approx. US$18.65 million). As of 31 December 2024, FTB had total assets worth UGX:551 billion (approx. US$158.081 million) with shareholders' equity of UGX:78.94 billion (approx. US$22,702,534). As of 31 December 2025, the bank had total assets of UGX:668 billion (US$180,483,980) with shareholders' equity of UGX:92.3 billion (US$24,938,130).

== Ownership ==
The stock ownership of the institution as of May 2018 is summarized in the table below.

Finance Trust Bank stock ownership
Rank	Name of owner	Percentage ownership
1	Uganda Womens Trust (Uganda)	20.10
2	Oikocredit Ecumenical Development Cooperative Society (Netherlands)	19.60
3	Progression Eastern African Micro Finance Equity Fund (Mauritius)	18.30
4	RIF North 1 (Mauritius)	18.30
5	Investment & Partner Afrique Entrepreneurs (Mauritius)	14.20
6	Ugandan Women Entrepreneurs (Uganda)	9.50
	Total	100.0

== Acquisition by Access Bank Group ==
In January 2024, Access Bank Group based in Nigeria agreed to acquire an 80 percent shareholding in Uganda's FTB. The deal involves the acquisition of shares of stock of existing institutional shareholders of FTB, followed by capital injection to increase FTB's capital base. The binding deal requires regulatory approval of the Central Bank of Nigeria, the Bank of Uganda and COMESA. Closure was expected in the first half of 2024.

COMESA approved the deal in May 2024. After the transaction is fully approved, the shareholding in the new Access Bank Uganda is expected to be as illustrated in the table below.

Access Bank Uganda stock ownership
Rank	Name of owner	Percentage ownership
1	Access Bank Group	80.89
2	Uganda Womens Trust	12.89
3	Minority Shareholders	6.22
	Total	100.0

The acquisition deal dragged on for more than two years and was postponed several times. Meantime FTB remained undercapitalized. Following the request of the board of FTB, the Bank of Uganda gave FTB from 1 January 2026 until 31 March 2026 to cease operating as a commercial bank and instead operate as a Tier II credit institution, whose capital requirements FTB met at that time.

== Branch network ==
As of April 2022, FTB maintained a network of 34 interconnected branches at the following locations:

1. Head Office - Twed Plaza, Lumumba Avenue
2. Katwe Branch Kampala-Entebbe Road, Katwe, Kampala
3. Arua Branch - Arua
4. Bombo Road Branch - Bombo Road, Kampala
5. Busia Branch - Custom Road, Busia
6. Entebbe Branch - Kampala Road, Entebbe
7. Fort Portal Branch - Rukidi III Street, Fort Portal
8. Gomba Branch - Kanoni, Gomba District
9. Iganga Branch - Main Street, Iganga
10. Ishaka Branch - Rukungiri Road, Ishaka
11. Jinja Branch - Iganga Road, Jinja
12. Kalangala Branch - Kalangala
13. Kaleerwe Branch - Kaleerwe, Kampala
14. Kampala Road Branch - Kampala Road, Kampala
15. Kamuli Branch - Kitimbo Road, Kamuli
16. Kamwenge Branch - Station Road, Kamwenge
17. Kapchorwa Branch - 46 Kapchorwa Road, Kapchorwa
18. Kayunga Branch - Main Street, Kayunga
19. Kikuubo Branch - Nakivubo Road, Kampala
20. Kitintale Branch - Kitintale - Kampala
21. Kumi Branch - Ngora Road, Kumi
22. Lugazi Branch - Kampala-Jinja Highway, Lugazi
23. Lwengo Branch - Mbiriizi, Lwengo District
24. Masaka Branch - Edward Avenue, Masaka
25. Mbale Branch - Republic Street, Mbale
26. Mbarara Branch - High Street, Mbarara
27. Mukono Branch - Kampala–Jinja Highway, Mukono
28. Nakivubo Branch - 30-32 Mackay Road, Freeman Foundation Building, Kampala
29. Nansana Branch - Hoima Road, Nansana
30. Nateete Branch - Masaka Road, Nateete
31. Ntungamo Branch - Old Kabale Road, Ntungamo
32. Owino Branch - Kafumbe Mukasa Road, Kampala
33. Pallisa Branch - Kasodo Road, Pallisa
34. Soroti Branch - Solot Avenue, Soroti
35. Tororo Branch - Bazaar Street, Tororo

== Governance ==
Evelyn Kigozi Kahiigi is the chairperson of the board of directors. She is one of the non-executive directors of the bank. There are ten other board members, including Annet Nakawunde Mulindwa, the managing director. Annette Kiggundu is the only other executive director on the board.

== See also ==
- List of banks in Africa
- List of banks in Uganda
