= Nakanyike Musisi =

Ugandan historian, author and academic

- Born: 26 April 1955 (age 71)
- Other name: Beatrice
- Citizenship: Uganda
- Occupations: Historian; Researcher; Author

Academic background
- Education: Makerere University; University of Birmingham (MA, M.Phil); University of Toronto (PhD)
- Alma mater: University of Toronto (Phd)

Academic work
- Discipline: Historian
- Institutions: Makerere University; University of Toronto

Nakanyike Beatrice Musisi, professionally known as Prof. Nakanyike Musisi (born April 26, 1955) is a Ugandan historian, researcher and author. She was the nineteenth executive director of the Makerere Institute of Social Research (MISR) at Makerere University from 1999-2009.

== Early life and education ==
Nakanyike Musisi was born on 26 April 1955 in Uganda. She earned her bachelor's degree from Makerere University before pursuing further studies abroad. She later obtained a Master of Arts and a Master of Philosophy from the University of Birmingham in the United Kingdom, and went on to earn a doctorate from the University of Toronto.

== Career ==
Musisi began her academic career at the University of Toronto in the 1980s as the first African woman to pursue a PhD in the department of History.

In 1999, she took a sabbatical and relocated back to Uganda to serve as director of the Makerere Institute of Social Research (MISR) at Makerere University, she held this position for ten years. In 2009, she resumed teaching full time at the University of Toronto in Canada. During her tenure as executive director of the Makerere Institute of Social Research (MISR), Musisi served on Uganda's Presidential AIDS Commission from 2004-2009.

Currently, Musisi serves as an Associate Professor in the department of history at the University of Toronto in Canada. Her research focuses on gender, colonialism, social change, education, missionary work in Uganda, and the study of African pre-colonial and colonial pasts.

Musisi is also one of the founders of Tingasiga, a Ugandan quarterly newsletter first published in 1988.

In addition, she serves as chancellor at the Ahaki Institute in Uganda.

== Publications ==
=== Books ===
1. Decentralization and transformation of governance in Uganda (2007)
2. Women in Africa colonial histories (2002).
3. Makerere University in transition, 1993-2000: opportunities and challenges (Higher education in Africa).
4. What is academic writing?
5. The Social origins of violence in Uganda, 1964-1985.
6. Decolonizing state and society in Uganda: the politics of knowledge and public life (2022).
7. What is plagiarism?

=== Book Chapters ===
1. Colonial and missionary education: women and domesticity in Uganda, 1900-1945.
2. Women and gender studies in Africa (2022).
3. Baganda women's night market activities, from B. House Midamba & F. Ekechi (eds) African market women and economic power: the role of women in African economic development.

=== Book Reviews ===
1. Generations Past: Youth in East African history by Andrew Burton, Hélène Charton-Bigot (2013).
2. Women in African Colonial Histories (2002).

=== Selected Articles ===
1. Women, "elite polygyny" and Buganda state formation (1991).
2. Gender and sexuality in African history: a personal reflection (2014).
3. Morality as identity: The missionary agenda in Buganda, 1877-1945 (1999).
4. Decolonizing knowledge in the bossom of the "Marketplace": Makerere University scholars in the age of the National Resistance Movement's neoliberal policies (1989-2007).
5. Transformations of Baganda women: from the earliest of times to the demise of the kingdom in 1966 (1995).
6. A history of African motherhood: the case of Uganda 700-1900 by Rhiannon Stephens (2015).
7. Women in pre-colonial Africa: East Africa (2021).
8. A personal journey into custom, identity, power and politics: researching and writing the life and times of Buganda's Queen Mother Irene Drusilla Namaganda (1896-1957).
9. The environment, gender and the development of unequal relations in Buganda: a historical perspective (1993).

== See also ==
- Mahmood Mamdani
- Makerere University
