= Access Bank Nigerian Government Bond Index =

The Access Bank Nigerian Government Bond Index is a liquid index that was created to ensure that there exists credible data on the Nigerian sovereign bond market which will help the investors and other stakeholders to make informed investment decisions while providing a benchmark for measuring the performance of the rapidly developing local currency bond markets. This is particularly important as the bonds market is becoming redefined from a primarily sovereign fiscal deficit process to a sound investment option.

== Index Characteristics ==
The index was introduced on December 29, 2006, and consists of local currency denominated fixed-rate Federal Government of Nigeria Bonds. In order to qualify for the index, a bond must be publicly issued through the Debt Management Office and traded under the Primary Dealer/Market Maker Trading Guidelines—as these are the liquid bonds that can be readily bought and sold in the secondary market. The selection of the index constituents reflects the FGN Bonds available. In order to ensure transparency of the Index, the pricing data are obtained from all the 21 licensed Primary Dealers/Market Makers in the country. It is therefore easy to replicate the Index in practice as it includes only traded issues. To aid in strategy development and return attribution, the bond indices include a wide array of statistical information that provides valuable comparative information.

== Overview of the Nigerian Government Bond Market ==
The resurgence in the domestic sovereign debt instruments could be traced to 2000 when the Debt Management Office ("DMO") was created with a mandate to centrally coordinate the management of Nigeria's debt, which was hitherto being done by myriad establishments in an uncoordinated fashion. Hitherto, a huge percentage of the Nigeria's domestic debt instruments were structured into Treasury Bills with maturities of 91days and below; creating inconsistencies and irregularities in the federal government's borrowing costs. The DMO, in a bid to restructure the Federal Government of Nigeria’s deficit funding from shorter to longer tenured borrowing instruments, improve and lengthen the yield curve in the domestic money markets, and to encourage long-term savings, introduced the sale of Federal Government of Nigeria ("FGN Bonds") Bonds in October 2003. The FGN Bonds were sold to the investing through all licensed banks and discount houses in the country. However, most of the investors adopted a "hold to maturity" approach and therefore little or no secondary trades were carried out in respect of those Bonds.

In August 2006, a primary dealership/market maker network was established whereby the Primary Dealers/Market Makers ("PDMMs") are the only institutions authorised to deal directly with the DMO in Bond auctions and as such are expected to play an active role in the issuance, sale and marketing of all FGN Bonds to be issued subsequent to their appointment as PDMMs. Apart from underwriting every Bond Issue, the PDMMs are also required to make 2-way price quotes on the Bonds to their customers and other PDMMs in all market conditions upon demand. In essence, therefore, there is a viable and vibrant secondary market trading in FGN Bonds issued by the DMO from August 2006.

== See also ==
- Index fund
- Bond market index

== External sources ==
- Access Bank Plc
- Debt Management Office
