= Access Bank Group =

Nigerian financial services conglomerate

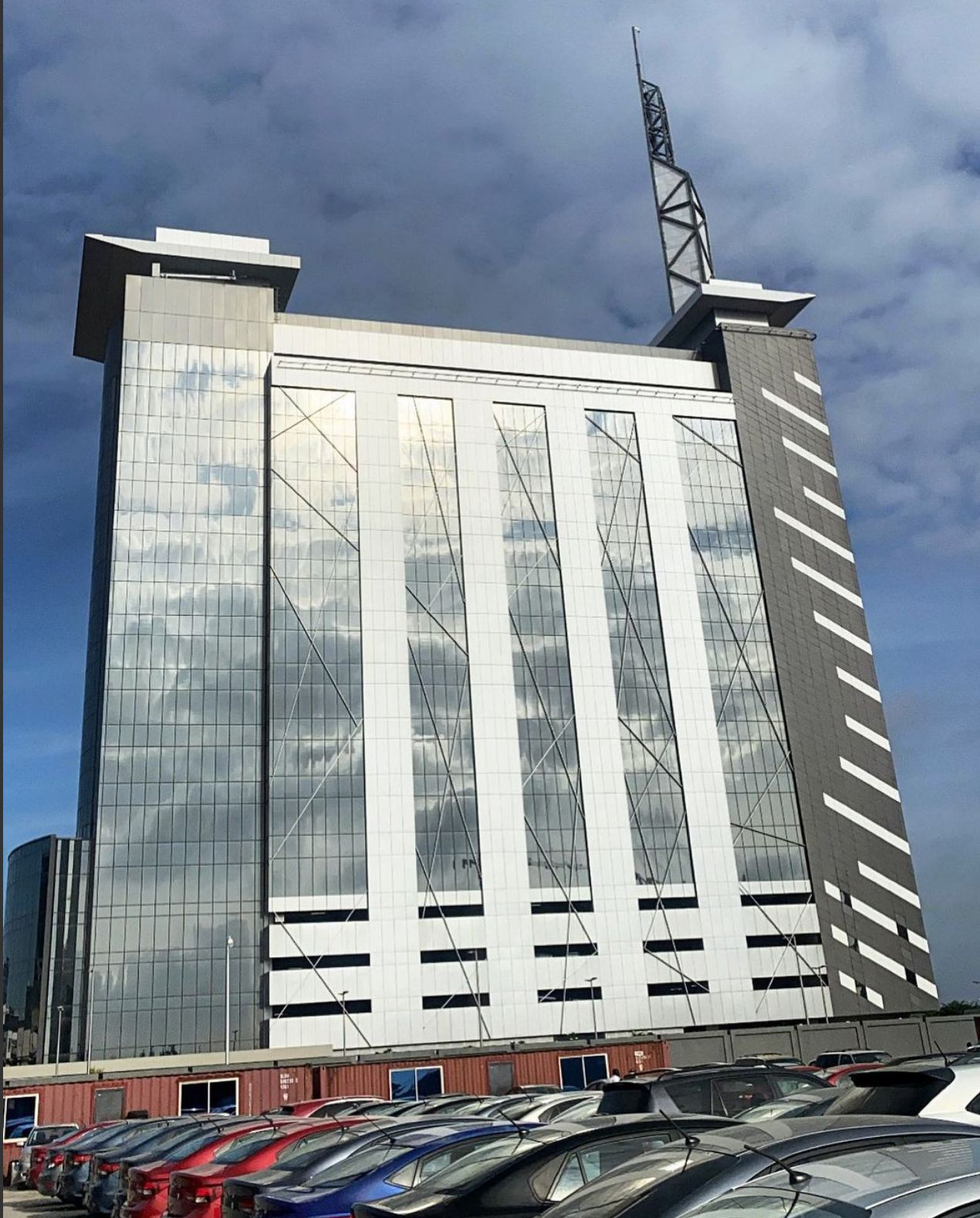
- Access Bank headquarter in Lagos
- Type: Private
- Traded as: NGX: ACCESS
- ISIN: NGACCESS0005
- Industry: Financial services
- Founded: 1989; 37 years ago
- Headquarters: Lagos, Nigeria
- Key people: Aigboje Aig-Imoukhuede (Chairman); Innocent C. Ike (CEO)
- Services: Banking; Mortgages; Investments
- Total assets: NGN36.5 trillion (2024)
- Number of employees: 28,121 (2021)
- Website: accessbankplc.com

Access Bank Group is a Nigerian financial services conglomerate, headquartered in Lagos, with subsidiaries across Africa, France, and the UK. The group also maintains representative offices in Asia and the UAE.

As of July 2021, the group serviced in excess of 42 million customers in Africa. After the April 2019 merger of Access Bank and Diamond Bank, Access Bank Plc became Africa's largest bank by customer base, and the largest bank in Nigeria by total assets.

== History ==
The bank was founded in 1988 and incorporated as a private commercial bank in February 1989. It actually began operations on 11 May 1989, establishing its first office located at Burma Road in the Apapa district of Lagos.

In March 1998, Access Bank changed its legal status and became a public limited company and in the same year, on 18 November, entered the Nigeria Stock Exchange.

In 2002, Aigboje Aig-Imoukhuede was appointed managing director and Herbert Wigwe, Deputy Managing Director, with the mandate of raising the bank from 65th place to the top 10 in 2007.

In 2003, Access Bank raised more than NGN 14.5 billion with a public offering, registering a 133% oversubscription. The same year, the bank received the Hewlett Packard Award for the best implementation of a basic banking application (Flexcube 6.2) in West Africa. The following year, Access Bank acquired Capital Bank and Marina Bank through a merger by absorption and integration.

During 2007, Access Bank became the first Nigerian bank to introduce Visa credit cards in Nigeria and achieved EMV certification for the multi-card ATM services platform. It also received funding from the Belgian Investment Company for Developing Countries. Access Bank successfully concluded its 3rd public offering in 2008, raising more than US$1 billion.

In 2009, Access Bank merged with the Intercontinental Commercial Bank (ICB) and was listed the same year (2012) on the LSE (London Stock Exchange). A 350 million dollars Eurobond was also successfully raised in parallel.

During 2018, Access Bank announced its intention to acquire Diamond Bank, which had a portfolio of 29 million customers, for US$235 million. The group also announced a collaboration with 25 global banks to develop the principles of sustainable banking and align the sector with the United Nations sustainable development goals, and the launch of Access WhatsApp Banking. Completion of the merger with Diamond Bank was announced in March 2019.

In March 2021, Access Bank announced the acquisition of a stake in Grobank, a South African bank, for US$60 million.

In mid-October 2021, Access Bank announced that the group has finalised the acquisition of 78.15 percent shareholding in the African Banking Corporation of Botswana, otherwise known as BancABC Botswana.

On 4 October 2021, the group issued a $500 million Eurobond, priced at 9.125 percent. According to Access Bank Group, this additional Tier One Eurobond which is issued under the bank's medium term note programme is a Basel III compliant Perpetual Non-Call 5.25-year Subordinated Note to be heated on the London Stock Exchange. The Eurobond may be called anytime from 7 October 2026, subject to conditions including the Central Bank of Nigeria's approval.

On 24 October 2021, Access Bank announced it has entered a binding pact to merge its Zambian unit with African Banking Corporation Zambia Limited in a planned reformation coming barely 9 months after it bought the subsidiary. The agreement confirms Access Bank's will to broaden its presence in the Southern African country to 70 branches and agencies, customer base to 300,0000, and total assets with a value in the neighbourhood of US$1 billion through the combined entity.

In March 2024, Access Bank Group signed binding contracts to acquire National Bank of Kenya, a subsidiary of the Kenya Commercial Bank Group. The transaction which requires regulatory approval in Kenya and Nigeria, is expected to conclude in Q4 2024.

In June 2024, Access Bank Group announced total assets of NGN 36.5 trillion (approx. US$22.419 billion), with shareholders' equity of NGN 2.8 trillion (approx. US$1.72 billion). As of that time, the group maintained operational banking subsidiaries in 20 countries in Sub-Saharan Africa, Europe and the Middle East.

== Expansion plan ==
=== In Africa ===
In early 2021, Access Bank announced that it had identified eight new African countries for potential expansion, seeking to benefit from a continent-wide free trade agreement. The target markets are Morocco, Algeria, Egypt, Côte d'Ivoire, Senegal, Angola, Namibia and Ethiopia, which would extend the international presence of the bank to 18 countries. Access Bank is expected to establish offices in some countries and in others, should partner with existing banks and leverage its digital platforms to provide services to clients.

In January 2024, Access Bank made binding commitments, subject to regulatory approval in Nigeria and Uganda, to acquire 80 percent shareholding in Finance Trust Bank, a Ugandan commercial bank that specializes in lending to women customers and women-led businesses.

In December 2024, Access Bank Plc. signed binding contracts to acquire 100 percent shareholding Bidvest Bank in South Africa for consideration of US$159 million (ZAR:2.8 billion). The deal is expected to close by June 2025 and is subject to regulatory approval.

=== Acquisition of selected assets of Standard Chartered in five African countries ===
In July 2023, Access Bank Group reached binding agreements with Standard Chartered Plc (SCB) of the United Kingdom for the Access group to acquire SCB shareholding in subsidiaries domiciled in Angola, Cameroon, Gambia and Sierra Leone. Access will also buy SCB's consumer, private & business banking business in Tanzania. The deal requires regulatory approval in the United Kingdom, Nigeria and in each of the five respective subsidiary domiciles. Completion of the acquisition is expected during H2 of 2024.

=== In France and Europe ===
In July 2021, the French government manifested its will to strengthen its ties with Nigerian captains of industry including Herbert Wigwe, the group managing director of Access Bank, and announced that an agreement had been signed which would allow the group to settle in France. This agreement confirms the group's vision and desire to extend its influence and activities to all of France and gradually to all of Europe. The opening of Access Bank in Paris will be managed by the group's London branch, headed by Britain's Jamie Simmonds. The new offices in France will focus on trade finance. The Nigerian bank is also considering embarking on investment and wealth management services.

== Member companies ==
As of October 2024 the member companies of Access Bank Group include but are not limited to the following:

Country	Name	Citation
Angola	Access Bank Angola	
Botswana	Access Bank Botswana	
Cameroon	Access Bank Cameroon	
Democratic Republic of the Congo	Access Bank Congo	
France	Access Bank France	
Gambia	Access Bank Gambia	
Ghana	Access Bank Ghana	
Guinea	Access bank Guinea	
Ivory Coast	Omnifinance Bank	
Kenya	Access Bank Kenya	
Malta	Access Bank Malta	
Mauritius	Access Bank Mauritius	
Morocco	Access Bank Morocco	
Mozambique	Access Bank Mozambique	
Nigeria	Access Bank Nigeria	
Rwanda	Access Bank Rwanda	
Sierra Leone	Access Bank Sierra Leone	
South Africa	Access Bank South Africa	
Tanzania	Access Bank Tanzania	
Uganda	Access Bank Uganda (Requires regulatory approval)	
United Arab Emirates	Access Bank United Arab Emirates	
United Kingdom	Access Bank United Kingdom	
Zambia	Access Bank Zambia	

== See also ==
- Vista Bank (Africa)
- List of banks in Nigeria
- Banking in Nigeria
