= Access Bank Kenya =

Commercial bank in Kenya

Access Bank (Kenya) PLC
- Type: Subsidiary of Access Bank Group
- Industry: Financial services
- Founded: 1984
- Headquarters: Nairobi, Kenya
- Key people: Barbara Barungi, chairperson Lillian Odhiambo, acting managing director
- Products: Loans, checking, savings, investments, debit cards
- Revenue: ▲ Aftertax: US$683,549 (KES:68.03 million) (2015)
- Total assets: US$113.6 million (KES:9.66 billion) (2013)
- Website: kenya.accessbankplc.com

Access Bank Kenya (ABK), whose complete name is Access Bank (Kenya) PLC, formerly Transnational Bank Kenya PLC, is a commercial bank in Kenya. It is licensed and regulated by the Central Bank of Kenya, the national banking regulator.

== History ==
TNB was established as a non-bank financial institution (NBFI) in 1984, under the name Transnational Finance Company (TNFC). TNFC provided loans, including lease-purchase arrangements to depositors and non-depositors. In 1985, following the issuance of a commercial banking license by the Central Bank of Kenya, the national banking regulator, the company began banking operations under its current name in Nairobi and Mombasa. At first other locations in the country continued to operate as TNFC offices. Between 1985 and 1996, all TNFC activities were merged with TNB and the TNFC brand was closed. The bank has one subsidiary; TNB Forex Bureau, located at Moi International Airport in Mombasa. The bank is also affiliated with Western Union, the American International money-transfer service. In 2009, TNB introduced Internet banking and mobile banking through mobile telephones.

== Overview ==
The bank is a medium-sized commercial bank in Kenya, East Africa's largest economy. As of December 2015, its assets were valued at about US$105.84 million (KES:10.53 billion), with shareholders' equity of about US$20.43 million (KES:2.033 billion).

== Branch network ==
The bank maintained 17 networked branches in Kenya, as of December 2013.

== Ownership ==
The shares of stock of Transnational Bank were privately held by Kenyan institutions and individuals. As of December 2015, the major shareholders in the bank were as depicted in the table below:

Trans National Bank Kenya stock ownership
Rank	Name of owner	Percentage ownership
1	Archers and Wilcock Limited	23.75
2	Sovereign Trust Limited	23.03
3	Duggan Limited	15.53
4	Pyramid Trustee Limited	15.12
5	November Nominees Limited	07.28
6	Simbi Investors	04.11
7	Losupuk Limited	02.79
8	Kenyerere Limited	02.15
9	Lohan Investments Limited	01.42
10	Others	04.80
	Total	100.00

== Acquisition ==
On 31 October 2019, the Business Daily Africa newspaper reported that Access Bank Nigeria, had received regulatory approval from the Competition Authority of Kenya (CAK) to acquire 93.57 percent in Transnational Bank of Kenya. The transaction had yet to receive the approval of the Central Bank of Kenya as of October 2019.

In January 2020, the Central Bank of Kenya gave approval for Access Bank Group to acquire up to 100 percent shareholding in Transnational Bank. In August 2020, the take-over was consummated after the new owners paid KES:1.4 billion (approx. US$13 million) to buy-out the previous shareholders. The bank re-branded to Access Bank (Kenya) PLC.

== Aborted merger ==
When the deal by Access Bank Group to acquire Sidian Bank is concluded, it is expected that the new acquisition will be merged into Access Bank Kenya. When that happens, the combined bank is expected to have assets valued at over KSh57.1 billion (approx. US$492 million), with loans totaling KSh26.6 billion (approx. US$229 million). The deal required regulatory approval in Kenya and Nigeria. In January 2023, Centum Investment Company Plc. called off the planned sale of the 83.4 percent shareholding that it owns in Sidian Bank to Access Bank Group. The time allocated to negotiations lapsed before an agreement could be reached.

== See also ==
- List of banks in Kenya
- Economy of Kenya
