= AccessBank Liberia =

- Type: Private
- Industry: Financial services
- Founded: 2009
- Headquarters: 20th Street, Sinkor; Monrovia, Liberia
- Key people: Klaus Mueller; Managing Director & CEO
- Products: Loans, Checking, Savings, Investments, Debit Cards
- Number of employees: 380 (2023)
- Website: Official website

AccessBank Liberia (ABL), is a commercial bank with a focus on lending to micro and SME (MSME) companies. It is licensed by the Central Bank of Liberia.

== Overview ==
ABL obtained a commercial banking licence in 2009. As of Feb. 2024, ABL has a loan portfolio of 16 Mio USD, customer deposits of 18 Mio USD and an equity of 11 Mio USD. The bank has 20.000 borrowers (mostly micro entrepreneurs) and disburses 2.000 loans monthly (mostly micro loans, denominated in Liberian dollars, with an average disbursed amount equivalent to 800 USD). ABL has 10 branches in Monrovia and several other regions of Liberia.

== Ownership ==
The bank's equity is owned by the following shareholders:

74% Access Microfinance Holding AG

14% African Development Bank

12% European Investment Bank

== Shareholders ==
=== AccessHolding ===
Access Microfinance Holding AG (AccessHolding) is a commercial microfinance holding company. Its business purpose is to invest in microfinance institutions (MFIs) and to develop these investments through a combination of equity finance, holding services, and management assistance.

Currently, AccessHolding has equity stakes in banks operating in Liberia, Madagascar, Nigeria, Zambia, Rwanda, Tajikistan and Georgia.

=== African Development Bank ===
The African Development Bank is a multilateral institution, whose objective is to contribute to the sustainable economic development and social progress of the African countries.

The AfDB Group development agenda is made of five key strategic priorities: to Feed Africa, to Light Up and Power Africa, to Industrialize Africa, to Integrate Africa, to Improve the Quality of Life for the People of Africa.

=== The European Investment Bank ===
The European Investment Bank (EIB) is the lending arm of the European Union. The EIB is one of the biggest multilateral financial institutions in the world. It works closely with other EU institutions to foster European integration, promote the development of the EU and support EU policies in over 160 countries around the world.

== See also ==
- Economy of Liberia
- List of banks in Liberia
