= FMO (Netherlands) =

Dutch development bank

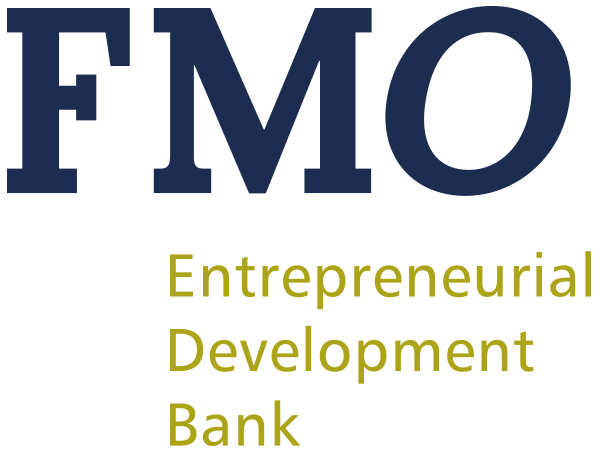
- Native name: Nederlandse Financierings-Maatschappij voor Ontwikkelingslanden N.V.
- Type: State owned company
- Industry: Development Finance
- Founded: July 8, 1970
- Headquarters: The Hague, Netherlands
- Products: Equity financing, loans, trade finance, credit guarantees
- Revenue: Aftertax: € 48 million (US$ 54 million) (2025) ▲
- Total assets: € 11.35 billion (US$ 12.81 billion) (2025)
- Number of employees: 866 (2024)
- Website: www.fmo.nl

FMO (Dutch: Nederlandse Financierings-Maatschappij voor Ontwikkelingslanden N.V.) is a Dutch development bank structured as a bilateral private-sector international financial institution based in the Hague, the Netherlands. Among others, FMO manages funds for the Ministries of Foreign Affairs and Economic Affairs of the Dutch government to maximize the development impact of private sector investments. It is licensed as a bank and supervised by the Dutch Central Bank.

The Dutch government holds 51% of the shares, but FMO operates as a commercial company. Due to its relationship with the Dutch government, it is able to take risks which commercial financiers are not able or not prepared to take. FMO holds a AAA rating from Standard and Poor's and Fitch Ratings. As of December 2025, the bank's total asset valuation was €11.35 billion (US$12.81 billion), and its shareholders' equity was €3.86 billion (US$4.36 billion).

FMO's mandate is to provide long term capital for projects in countries in which commercial investors do not yet dare to invest. It invests risk capital in companies and financial institutions in developing countries and has a strict policy on maximizing development impact with a methodology designed to make sure that FMO's return on investment is not just financial but also has positive environmental and social effects. Since 2017, FMO has strategically focused on three core sectors: Energy, Financial Institutions, and Agribusiness, Food and Water. FMO also makes investments by using government funds, examples are: Dutch Fund for Climate and Development, NASIRA Program, and Building Prospects. The funds amount to €76.9 million (US$ 79.6 million), €10.8 million (US$11.2 million) and €9.6 million (US$9.911 million) respectively in 2024. Currently FMO has 771 ongoing investments in more than 85 different countries.

== History ==
FMO was founded in 1970 by the Dutch Government in conjunction with commercial banks, the national employers' association, labor unions, and private investors to invest in private sector projects in developing countries and emerging markets. In March 2008, FMO achieved bank status; the bank has been under the supervision of the Dutch Central Bank (DNB) since then.

== Objectives ==
FMO manages funds for the Ministries of Foreign Affairs and Economic Affairs of the Dutch government to maximize the development impact of private sector investments in emerging markets. For instance, the Capacity Development Program provides funding with the aim to create access to management and technical know-how.

== Controversial investments ==
In 2009 the FMO invested in a coal power plant near Bargny in Senegal, called Sendou I. The project triggered a debate about the impact on the environmental circumstances of the inhabitants. Following this, the Independent Complaints Mechanism of FMO has undertaken a Compliance Review and a Mediation process, in reaction to which the Management Board of FMO has written an official response

== Ownership ==
The stock of FMO is held by individual, corporate and public Dutch entities as outlined in the table below:

FMO Stock Ownership 2025
Rank	Name of Owner	Percentage Ownership
1	Dutch Government	51.00
2	Large Dutch Banks	42.00
3	Dutch Employers' Association, Dutch Trade Unions, and Individual investors	7.00
	Total	100.00

== See also ==
- Dutch-Bangla Bank
- List of banks in the Netherlands
- Belgian Investment Company for Developing Countries
- German Investment Corporation
- Danish International Development Agency
- French Development Agency
