= Access Bank South Africa =

South African commercial banking subsidiary

Coordinates: 26°06′49″S 28°03′35″E

- Formerly: Grobank Limited and Bank of Athens (South Africa)
- Type: Subsidiary
- Industry: Financial services
- Founded: 2021; 5 years ago
- Headquarters: Johannesburg, Gauteng, South Africa
- Key people: Sugendhree Reddy (CEO)
- Products: Banking; Loans, Investments
- Parent: Access Bank Group
- Website: southafrica.accessbankplc.com

Access Bank South Africa, formerly Grobank Limited, is a South African commercial bank. Founded in 2021 in its current form, Access Bank SA is a subsidiary of Nigerian Access Bank Group.

The bank began commercial operations in June 2021, following the acquisition of a retail commercial banking license. In 2024, Access Bank SA acquired Bidvest Bank to continue its expansion in South Africa.

== History ==
Bank of Athens (South Africa) started operations in 1947. In October 2018, Grobank Limited concluded the acquisition of 99.81 percent shareholding in Bank of Athens (South Africa). The bank rebranded to Grobank Limited and focused its activities to lending to the agricultural sector.

In March 2021, Access Bank Group paid an estimated US$60 million to acquire a controlling interest in Grobank Limited. Access Bank went further and obtained regulatory approval to rebrand Grobank to Access Bank South Africa and to convert to a retail commercial bank. It opened to customers under those new terms in June 2021.

In December 2024, the company acquired Bidvest Bank to enhance Access Bank's growth in South Africa. Bidvest Bank had 140 retail locations which will increase Access banks retail network in South Africa.

== See also ==
- Banking in South Africa
- List of banks in South Africa
