= Bank of Zambia =

Monetary authority of Zambia

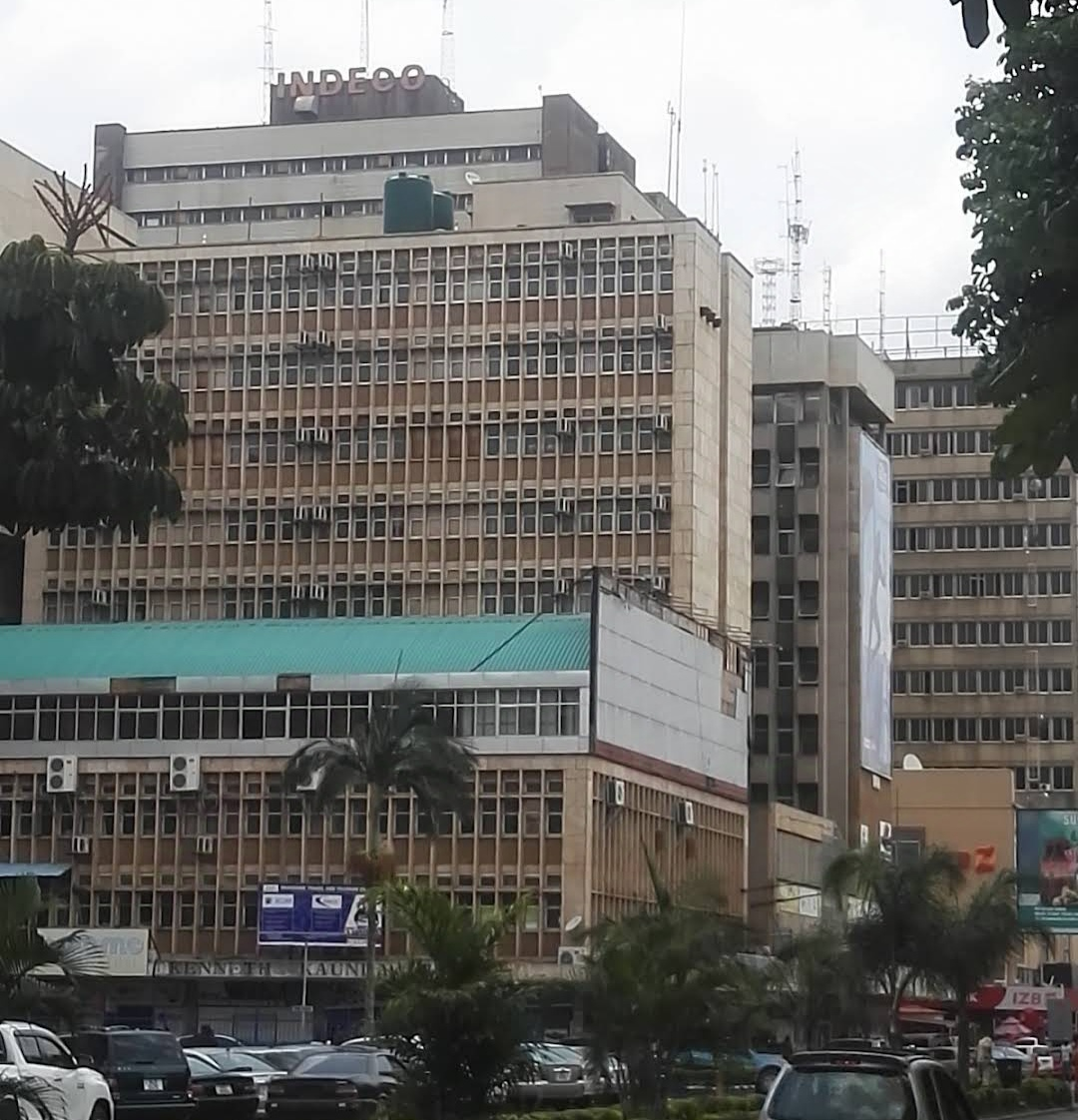
- Central bank of: Zambia
- Headquarters: Lusaka
- Established: 1964
- Ownership: 100% state ownership
- Governor: Dr. Denny Kalyalya
- Currency: Zambian kwacha ZMW (ISO 4217)
- Reserves: 2 530 million USD
- Website: http://www.boz.zm/

The Bank of Zambia (BoZ), is the central bank of Zambia.

== Overview ==
The principal responsibility of the bank is to create and implement monetary policy that will maintain the economic stability of the country. The Bank is active in promoting financial inclusion policy and is a leading member of the Alliance for Financial Inclusion. It is also one of the original 17 regulatory institutions to make specific national commitments to financial inclusion under the Maya Declaration, during the Global Policy Forum, held in Riviera Maya, Mexico in 2011.

== Functions of Bank of Zambia ==
1. To ensure appropriate monetary policy formulation and implementation;
2. To provide banking services to Government, commercial banks and to act as Settlement Agent;
3. To license, regulate and supervise banks and financial service institutions;
4. To ensure a safe and sound financial system and;
5. To manage the banking, currency and payment systems operations of the Bank of Zambia.

== Administration ==
Since its inception, the Bank of Zambia has gone through various changes in its organisational structure. Over time, this has resulted into an organisational structure which has become more focused on the core activities of the central bank. Furthermore, the Bank has shed off staff in areas where outsiders could easily be contracted to provide the same services more satisfactorily. The areas now being contracted to external bodies include: outside security, canteen services, club and maintenance. As a result of the restructuring exercise, the Bank has seen the total number of staff fall from 1,400 to well below 850. But while more such functions have been dropped, others more critical in the new liberalised environment have emerged. These new areas are mainly in the policy making arena.

The Bank of Zambia has fourteen departments: Banking, Currency and Payment Systems, Bank Supervision, Board Services, Economics, Finance, Financial Markets, Human Resources, Information and Communication Technology, Internal Audit, Legal Services, Non-Bank Financial Institution Supervision, Procurement and Maintenance Services, Strategy and Risk Management, and the Security Division.

== Board of directors ==
The board of the Bank of Zambia is composed of the governor, who is the chairperson, and six other directors appointed by the Minister of Finance and National Planning. The directors are appointed from among persons with professional or academic experience in business or financial matters and who are not officials or employees of the bank. All directors of the board are non-executive directors. The Secretary to the Treasury is an ex-officio member of the board and without power to vote. The Secretary to the Treasury also does not count for a quorum. The vice chairperson is elected by the board from among the members of the board. Directors of the board are appointed for a period of three years and are eligible to be reappointed for another three years. The board is the overall authority in which all the powers of the bank are vested. It is responsible for formulation of the Bank of Zambia policy.

== History ==
The Bank of Zambia has origins in the 1937 formation of the Southern Rhodesia Currency Board, which was based in Harare, in present-day Zimbabwe. The board's jurisdiction included Northern Rhodesia, now called Zambia and Nyasaland, known as Malawi today.

In 1954, the Southern Rhodesia Currency Board was renamed the Currency Board of Rhodesia and Nyasaland, the currency board was transformed into the Bank of Rhodesia and Nyasaland in 1956.

In 1964, the Bank of Zambia was created from the Bank of Northern Rhodesia, which itself had only formed a year earlier in 1963 from the Lusaka branch of the Rhodesia and Nyasaland bank.

After its creation, and after the passage of the Bank of Zambia Act in 1965, the bank grew and was successful down through the decades. According to its website, the bank acquired an equity stake in the Development Bank of Zambia and the Zambia National Commercial Bank and was even considering diversifying into the agricultural sector.

In 1991, the Movement for Multi-party Democracy (MMD) came to power in Zambia, replacing the United National Independence Party (UNIP) which had ruled for 27 years. The new government's fiscal priorities included liberalization and privatization, which included the Zambian copper industry and Zambian Consolidated Copper Mines (ZCCM), the company that controlled copper production in Zambia.

The bank repelled a hacker attack by Hive ransomware group in 2022, which was later infiltrated and subsequently shut down in January 2023, when the United States Department of Justice announced that it had coordinated with Germany and the Netherlands to seize Hive's servers following investigation by its Federal Bureau of Investigation. Bank of Zambia said it declined to pay the ransom. It also said the breach caused minimal damage to its systems.

In July 2023, the company suffered a hack of its Facebook account.

== Governors ==
The Governor is the head of the Bank of Zambia.

As of August 2022, the Governor serves a six-year term, which will be renewable for further term of six years, after being nominated by the President of Zambia and confirmed by the National Assembly of Zambia following a new legislation – Bank of Zambia (BOZ) Act No. 5 of 2022. The new act also serves to further the independence of the Central Bank by providing security of tenure for the Governor and his deputies, who, in the event of any allegations, are to be brought before a three-person tribunal headed by Judge or former Judge with the other two members being persons with knowledge and experience in the field of central banking or economics, finance, law or any other field that is related to central banking.

=== List of Bank of Zambia Governors ===
- H. C. Harret, 1964–1967
- Justin B. Zulu, 1967–1970
- Valentine Musakanya, 1970–1972
- Bitwell Kuwani, 1972–1976
- Luke Mwananshiku, 1976–1981
- Bitwell Kuwani, 1981–1984
- David Phiri, 1984–1986
- Leonard Chivuno, 1986–1987
- Francis Nkhoma, 1987–1989
- Jacques Bussières, 1990–1992
- Dominic Mulaisho, 1992–1995
- Jacob Mwanza, 1995–2002
- Caleb Fundanga, 2002–2011
- Michael Gondwe, 2011–2015
- Denny Kalyalya, 2015–2020
- Christopher Mvunga, 2020–2021
- Denny Kalyalya, 2021–present

== Gold Stock ==
BoZ purchases gold locally from Kansanshi Copper Mine and the Zambia Gold Company for its reserves.

Year	Cummulative Gold Reserves US$	Source	Notes
2021	43,000,000		
2022	72,000,000		target for 2022 is US$100 million in Gold

== See also ==
- Zambian kwacha
- Economy of Zambia
- Tukiya Kankasa-Mabula
- List of central banks of Africa
- List of central banks
