= Moner Manush =

2010 Indian film

- Theatrical Release Poster
- মনের মানুষ
- Directed by: Goutam Ghose
- Screenplay by: Goutam Ghose
- Based on: Moner Manush by Sunil Gangopadhyay
- Produced by: Gautam Kundu; Habibur Rahman Khan
- Starring: Prosenjit; Priyanshu Chatterjee; Raisul Islam Asad; Paoli Dam
- Cinematography: Sunirmal Majumder
- Edited by: Moloy Banerjee
- Music by: Goutam Ghose
- Production companies: Rosevalley Films Ltd (India); Impress Telefilm Ltd. (Bangladesh)
- Distributed by: Impress Telefilm Ltd.; Rosevalley Films Ltd; Vesctesh Films Pvt. Ltd.
- Release date: 3 December 2010
- Running time: 150 minutes
- Countries: India; Bangladesh
- Language: Bengali

Moner Manush (Bengali: মনের মানুষ, lit. 'Ideal Person') is a 2010 Indo-Bangladesh joint production Bengali-language biographical musical drama film based on the life and philosophy of Lalon, a noted spiritual leader, poet and folk singer of Bengal in the 19th century. Produced by Goutam Ghose under the banner of Rosevilley Films Ltd. and the film was co-produced by Bangladeshi production house Impress Telefilm Ltd. Directed by Goutam Ghose, who also wrote the screenplay, the film has Prosenjit as the lead actor portraying the character of Lalan Fakir. Paoli Dam plays the character of Komli, the key female disciple of Lalan. Moner Manush has been critically and commercially successful.

== Plot ==
Rabindranath Tagore's elder brother Jyotirindranath Tagore, a Western educated bright young man from the 19th century Bengal met the octogenarian Lalan Fakir and drew a portrait of the poet saint in the former houseboat afloat on the Padma river. Jyotirindranath, an urban intellectual, exchanges views with the man of native wisdom. Their exchange of ideas forms the cinematic narrative of this film. The narrative is a saga of the life and time of Lalan Fakir and his liberal sect who lived a life of high order in an otherwise superstitious 19th century Indian society. Lalan inherited the best of the liberal and enlightened tradition of Hinduism, Buddhism and Islam to develop a philosophy of life which is extremely secular and tolerant. Thus became an easy prey for the fundamentalists from the Hindu and the Muslim institutions. They were the parallel stream flowing freely in the heart of rural Bengal when men like Tagore were germinating ideas of the Bengal Renaissance. The love and compassion of Lalan is relevant more than ever in today's world of intolerance and hate.

== Cast ==
- Prosenjit Chatterjee as Lalon
- Priyanshu Chatterjee as Jyotirindranath Tagore
- Chanchal Chowdhury as Kaluah
- Raisul Islam Asad as Siraj Saain
- Gulshan Ara Champa as Padmabati, Lalon's mother
- Sudeshna Swayamprabha as Golapi
- Shantilal Mukherjee as Kangal Harinath
- Paoli Dam as Komli
- Shuvra Kundu as Bhanumati
- Anirban Guha as Mir Mosharraf Hossain
- Shahed Ali as Duddu Shah

== Awards ==
The film won Golden Peacock (Best Film) at the 41st International Film Festival of India, in 2010.

- The movie has also won the award for Best Feature Film on National Integration and National Film Award for Best Make-up Artist at 58th National Film Awards.
- Jury Prize for Best Cinematographer at 41st International Film Festival of India (IFFI) in 2010
- Bangladesh National Award (2010) for Best Art Direction
- Official selection at Shanghai International Film Festival (2011)
