= Gam'eya =

Rotating finance system

Gam'eya or jameya is a form of rotating savings and credit association (ROSCAS) used in over 89 countries and communities, particularly in the Middle East. It operates when a group comes together and contributes a fixed monthly amount into a common pot; each person takes a turn taking all the money at the end of each month. It is also referred to as a chit fund in India and a tanda in Mexico.

== Operation ==
1. A group of friends joins together to contribute a fixed monthly installment into a common pot.
2. Every month one of the users takes the whole pot as a payout.
3. The circle ends when all circle participants have gotten their payout once.
4. The circle is then usually repeated with the same group of people over again.
