= Community Bank =

A community bank is a depository institution that is typically locally owned and operated.

Community Bank may refer to:

- Community Bank, N.A., a bank headquartered in DeWitt, New York, U.S.
- New York Community Bank, a bank headquartered in Westbury, New York, U.S.
- Community Bank (Oregon), a bank headquartered in Joseph, Oregon, U.S.
- Community Bank Bangladesh Limited, a bank headquartered in Dhaka, Bangladesh
- North Edinburgh and Castle Credit Union Ltd., trading as Castle Community Bank, a credit union headquartered in Edinburgh, Scotland, U.K.

== See also ==
- Community banking models
