= Susu =

Susu may refer to:

- Susu people or Soussou, an ethnic group in Guinea
- Susu language, language spoken by this ethnic group
- Sosso Empire, a twelfth-century Takrur kingdom of West Africa
- Susu (savings), an informal savings account practiced in the Caribbean
- Susu account, a saving scheme for poor people in Ghana

SUSU may refer to:

- South Ural State University
- University of Southampton Students' Union
- Sheffield University Students' Union
- Staffordshire University Students' Union
- Swansea University Students' Union
