= STCU =

STCU may stand for:

- Spokane Teachers Credit Union, a United States credit union based in Spokane, Washington, with operations in the Spokane area and parts of Northern Idaho
- Science and Technology Center in Ukraine, a Ukraine-based intergovernmental organization
