= Mission Asset Fund =

San Francisco-based nonprofit organization

- Abbreviation: MAF
- Formation: 2007; 19 years ago
- Founder: Levi Strauss Foundation and community groups
- Type: Nonprofit organization
- Legal status: Charity
- Purpose: Establish or improve a credit scores
- Location: San Francisco, United States
- Services: Improve credit scores, zero interest loans
- Website: www.missionassetfund.org

Mission Asset Fund (MAF) is a San Francisco-based nonprofit organization that seeks to offer financial stability to low-income families by facilitating zero-interest lending and simultaneous credit building. Their model, based on the Mexican "tanda" system, links community members into rotating savings and credit associations, and then reports this participation to credit bureaus to help their members establish or improve a credit score.

== History ==
Founded in 2007, in partnership with the Levi Strauss Foundation, MAF has since partnered with other nonprofit finance organizations to the open 27 providers in 11 states.

In 2014, California State Senator Lou Correa collaborated with MAF to pass legislation "SB 896," a bill that exempts organizations like MAF from being required to hold lending licenses, as such organizations do not lend any money, they merely facilitate and back the circulation of funds.

== Programs ==
=== Lending Circles ===
After completing an online financial training course, six to ten participants come together to agree on an amount to save in total, and in turn, to contribute weekly. Each week, a different member receives the total weekly contributions until each member has collected exactly what they have contributed. Meanwhile, MAF or the nonprofit partner provider reports each member's participation to credit bureaus.

=== Lending Circles for Citizenship ===
Recognizing that U.S. Citizenship "is a powerful financial asset," Lending Circles for Citizenship provides the same structure as the general program, but is specifically structured so that the participant makes ten weekly payments of $68, and ends with a check written to the U.S. Department of Homeland Security to cover the exact cost of the application for citizenship.

=== Lending Circles for Dreamers ===
Similar to the Lending Circles for Citizenship program, this program is targeted to help youth raise the $465 fee required to apply for Deferred Action for Childhood Arrivals. DACA offers deferred removal action for two years to undocumented immigrants who arrived before their 16th birthday and before January, 2007.

=== Security Deposit Loan ===
MAF issues a voucher to qualified housing providers so that participants can move into a new apartment or home immediately, and then pay off that deposit over time at zero-interest. Once again, participants must enroll in an online financial training course, and also receive formal credit acknowledgement for their efforts.

== Impacts ==
As of 2020, MAF's providers have offered over $3 million in zero-interest loans to over 2,200 borrowers. An independent evaluation performed by San Francisco State University revealed that the average participant saved approximately $360 as compared to alternative borrowing institutions and improved their credit score by 168 points.

Professor Carlos Vélez-Ibañez of Arizona State University, preeminent scholar on tandas in the United States, praises MAF by saying, "by formalizing these financial activities, MAF is helping immigrants improve their credit history by valuing their cultural assets." NPR's "Code Switch: Frontiers of Race, Culture, and Ethnicity" series highlighted the story of one participant, Alicia Villanueva, who used her MAF savings to expand her tamale business.
