= José A. Quiñonez =

American businessman

- Other names: José Quiñonez
- Education: University of California, Davis (B.A., 1994)
- Alma mater: Princeton University (M.A., 1998)
- Known for: Mission Asset Fund
- Notable work: Winning MacArthur Fellows Program

José A. Quiñonez is an American financial-services innovator and winner of the MacArthur Fellows Program. He founded the San Francisco-based nonprofit Mission Asset Fund in 2007 in order to legitimize informal peer-to-peer lending networks in order to help marginalized groups build credit and serves as its CEO.

== Education ==
In 1994, he received a B.A. from the University of California, Davis and an M.P.A. in 1998 from Princeton University.
