= Osusu =

Type of ROSCA in Africa

An osusu (or isusu or esusu) is a form of rotating savings and credit association found in Africa, for microfinancial capital accumulation. Osusus are the regional version of what in other places are called susus, tandas, or by other names. They are small groups such as in Sierra Leone 'where, for example, ten people put Le 5,000 in a pot and then one of the ten takes the resulting Le 50,000 for his or her own use, promising to put in Le 5,000 at the next group meeting to continue the process.' The word 'osusu' has its origin the Igbo word 'Isusu' which means rotational savings.

The money is collected on a daily, weekly, and/or monthly basis by what is known as a thrift collector. Thrift collectors are typically male.

Participants in the osusu must pay the thrift collector a participation fee depending on the rate to which they contribute money. If they contribute daily they owe the thrift collector one full days contribution every eighth day. If they contribute weekly they owe the thrift collector 1/7 the contribution amount weekly.

An osusu continues to conduct turns until each member has a chance to use the money. Once each member has done so the group may either discontinue using the osusu or restart the process.

Campaigns to start osusus have even reached as far as the West Coast of the United States.

== See also ==
- Likelemba, another term for the same thing, used in different regions
- Tontine (various versions, some of which are ROSCAs)
