= Stokvel =

Informal savings syndicate

In South Africa, a stokvel is an invitation-only club of twelve or more people serving as a rotating credit union or saving scheme. Members contribute fixed sums of money to a central fund on a weekly, fortnightly or monthly basis. The name stokvel originates from the concept of "stock fairs", as the rotating cattle auctions of English settlers in the Eastern Cape during the early 19th century were known.

Stokvels generally have a constitution which dictates the size of the contributions, when the accumulated money is to be paid out and the roles and responsibilities of the members. Each month a different member receives the money in the fund, which was collected during that period. Defaults on contribution are quite rare as other members will know if one has not paid their contribution, and also because the regular meetings serve as reminders. Depending on the type of stokvels, the members can use the collected fund for their own use, for payment or investment purposes.

It is estimated that half of adult South Africans are member of at least one of 800,000 stokvels. South Africans invest approximately R50 billion in stokvels a year.

Stokvels are regulated by the National Stokvel Association of South Africa (NASASA), a self-regulatory organisation approved by the Prudential Authority. NASASA is also a registered Financial Co-operative. The organisation was established in 1988 by founder and still-chairman, Andrew Lukhele. Its board of directors includes Miziyonke Mtshali (CEO) and Siphumelele Macozoma (COO).

== Types ==
Contribution Stokvels
Traditional savings scheme in which members contribute a fixed amount of money to a common pool weekly, fortnightly or monthly. Members would receive the lump sum on a rotational basis, and they are free to use the money for any purpose.

Basic Stokvels
Differ from the contributions stokvel in that it functions as a savings scheme that pays out for specific events, such as for a death, or at Christmas.

Grocery Stokvels
Collects the grocery or cash coupons that members receive from supermarket chains when they buy provisions for the stokvel parties throughout the year, and distributed these coupons at the end of the saving period.

Purchasing Stokvels
Collects pool money on a regular basis and uses it to purchase big items that can be used by the group to generate an income for example, a marquee that could be rented out to the community for use on special occasions.

Family Stokvels
Invest the pooled money in formal bank accounts or financial services. The money is paid out according to the needs of the family, but generally the funds are used for buying land or cars, for business investments, or for deposits on bank loans.

Investment Group
Invests money in order to benefit from the interest. When an investment pays out, the money is split but, in some cases, part of it will be kept back for reinvestment.

Party Stokvels
Arranges street or jazz parties, often with live entertainment. An entrance fee is charged, and food and drink is sold. Members then share in the profits.

Borrowing Stokvels
Loans money at high monthly interest rates (20–50%) to members and sub-members from its regular pool money.

== Burial societies ==
A burial society provides "informal insurance" to help families with the costs of a funeral in the event of a death. Burial societies also provide practical support for the family during the preparations; for example, by helping to prepare food. This is similar to a stokvel, in that monthly fees are collected. However, the main difference is that periodical payouts are not made and new member can only benefit after a three-month waiting period.

Burial societies are invariably intended for poorer and less educated people. Burial societies can be seen as the product of urban living and appear to have evolved in order to aid migrants from the rural areas who find themselves facing problems in a strange and hostile environment. In South Africa, the disadvantaged, and the poorer and less educated classes, have historically been African and Coloured people. The burial societies help alleviate the expenses incurred when burying a loved one. It therefore comes as no surprise to find that burial societies tend to be more popular in these communities.

== Benefits ==
- The peer pressure encourages members to save.
- Pooled money can earn better returns, at a lower cost. Banks offer higher interest rates on bigger amounts and banking costs are lowered (or in some cases, free) if the amount is large enough.
- Sense of community and socialising. Stokvel members traditionally meet regularly and make an occasion of the meetings.
- Educational. Some stokvels operate like investment clubs and invest in the stock exchange or companies. Members do their homework, deliberate about which shares or companies to invest in and make investment decisions.
- Knowing when a windfall will be received makes it easier to plan one's finances.
- Reduces chances of savings being stolen if the money is moving rather than saving the money at home.

== Pyramid schemes ==
In 2022, after receiving several complaints from the public, South Africa's Financial Sector Conduct Authority released an official warning to the public regarding "The Prosperity Grid", saying that although it resembled a traditional stokvel, they considered its structure to be a pyramid scheme in the style of the 1980s US "airplane game".

== See also ==
- Rotating savings and credit association
- Collaborative finance
- Kitty party
