= Moniruddin Khan =

Indian historian (born 1974)

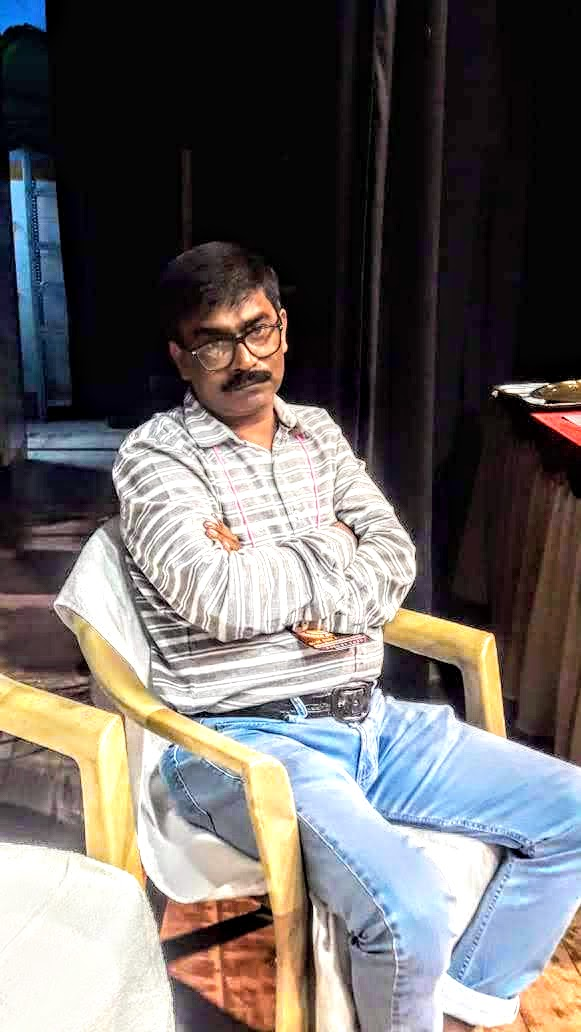
- Born: August 1974 (age 51–52); Murshidabad, West Bengal, India
- Education: Rabindra Bharati University
- Occupation: Teacher
- Writing career
- Notable works: Murshidabade Samprodayik Sompritir Ruprekha (ISBN 978-93-82042-46-7)

Moniruddin Khan (born August 1974) is a Bengali poet and writer. He was born in the village Chaitpur in the district of Murshidabad, West Bengal.

== Works ==
Khan's first poem was published at the age of 15. He has published poems and essays in many magazines published from the different parts of Bengal. His collection of essays Murshidabade Samprodayik Sompritir Ruprekha was appreciated by several Bengali scholars for his neutral outlook of the subject. His translated books include Viswa Dharma Islam (বিশ্ব ধর্ম ইসলাম), Islami Jiboner Saral Path (ইসলামই জীবনের সরল পথ) both published from Mallick Brothers, Kolkata. One of his translated books হিন্দুত্ত্ব ও ইসলাম: একটি তুলনামূলক আলোচনা ("Hindutva o Islam: Ekti Tulonamulak Alochona") created a controversy by the West Bengal state BJP. Other essays include Modhyojuger Banglai Sompritir Sur, Bangali Musalmaner Bangalitto Kotokhani, Madar Biye- Rarh Bonger Ekti Mritoprai Loukik Songoskriti, Nakshikantha, Noton Noton Pairagli, Kabirul Islam-kichu smriti kichu kotha, Sukumar Roy, Syed Mustafa Sirajer Kornel Beche Thakbe etc.

His literary works have been published in Jhar, Arambha, Kalom, Nuton Goti, Sakalbela, Oikyo, Nilaksar, Trikut Kanya, Orchrestra, Moth, Mouriphul, Deshkal, Angangi, Hijalpare, Nini, Kabita Troimasik, Ayan, Dristi, Srijani, Hijibiji, Bhagirathi, charulata, Abar esechi fire, Anubhab, Robi Asar, Nayan, Udar Akash, Banglar kathamukh etc.

== Personal life and education ==
Moniruddin Khan came of a middle class Muslim family of Chaitpur in the district of Murshidabad district, West Bengal. His father Abdul Haque Khan is a retired teacher and mother Nurjahan Khanam is a housewife.

From village primary school he went to Sundarpur high school and passed the madhyamic exam. He was at Ramnagar Sahora high school for a very short time. He passed H.S. and B.A. Honours from Khujutipara Chandidas Mahavidyalaya at Nanoor, Birbhum. He passed M.A. from the Rabindra Bharati University in Kolkata. Then took the profession of teaching. He taught at Amdanga High School, Hatiara Swami Vivekananda School, Hatiara High Madrasah (all three institutes at North 24 parganas) and now is in Jhunka High Madrasah in Beldanga, Murshidabad.

== See also ==
- List of Indian writers
