= Saradha Group financial scandal =

Financial scandal in India

SaradhaGroup
- Type: Privately owned
- Industry: Financial services, infrastructure management, automobiles, manufacturing
- Genre: Deposit mobilising company
- Founder: Unclear
- Defunct: April 2013
- Fate: Allegations that this consortium of companies is a Ponzi scheme
- Headquarters: Kolkata, West Bengal, India
- Key people: Sudipto Sen, Chairman and MD; Debjani Mukherjee, Director; Kunal Ghosh
- Number of employees: 16,000+
- Divisions: Saradha Realty; Saradha Exports; Global automobiles Saradha media group

The Saradha Group financial scandal was a major political scandal caused by the collapse of a Ponzi scheme run by Saradha Group, a consortium of over 200 private companies that was believed to be running collective investment schemes popularly but incorrectly referred to as chit funds in Eastern India.

The group collected around ₹200 to 300 billion (US$4–6 billion) from over 1.7 million depositors before it collapsed in April 2013. In the aftermath of the scandal, the State Government of West Bengal where the Saradha Group and most of its investors were based instituted an inquiry commission to investigate the collapse. The State government also set up a fund of ₹5 billion (US$52 million) to ensure that low-income investors were not bankrupted.

The central government through the Income Tax Department and Enforcement Directorate launched a multi-agency probe to investigate the Saradha scam and similar Ponzi schemes. In May 2014, the Supreme Court of India, due to inter-state ramifications, possible international money laundering, serious regulatory failures and alleged political nexus, transferred all investigations into the Saradha scam and other Ponzi schemes to the Central Bureau of Investigation (CBI), India's federal investigative agency. Many prominent personalities including politicians were arrested for their alleged involvement in the scam including two Members of Parliament (MP) - Kunal Ghosh and Srinjoy Bose from the Trinamool Congress, former West Bengal Director General of Police Rajat Majumdar, a top football club official Debabrata Sarkar, Sports and Transport minister in the Trinamool Congress government Madan Mitra.

The scam has often been compared to the Sanchayita investment scam, a multi crore rupees scam that occurred in West Bengal in the 1970s, complaints related to which led to the formation of the Prize Chits and Money Circulation Schemes (Banning) Act of 1978.

== Background ==
India has a large, low-income, rural population with limited access to formal banking facilities. This leads to the absence of two major helplines for poorer people - that of placing their money safely in deposits and secondly of being able to borrow money for their needs which may be as simple as buying seeds for the next crop or their children's marriage. The second aim is achieved instead by a web of parallel, informal banking in the form of money lenders (pawn brokers) who have existed in India for a few centuries. At its centre are moneylenders, mostly unregulated, often also wealthy landlords or now politicians, used to charging exorbitant rates of interest. To curb this practice, several Moneylenders Acts were enacted by the State governments of India by the 1950s. However failure to replace the role of moneylenders gave rise to unscrupulous financial operators that operated Ponzi schemes. Some commentators place the blame for these kinds of Ponzi schemes on greed rather than exclusion from formal banking systems.

However, this does not address the former issue of being able to save their money easily, keep it in safekeeping and invest it so that it grows. While post offices have tried to address this through postal savings banks, people are often lured by Ponzi schemes that promise much higher returns.

The relatively prosperous rural economy of West Bengal had previously relied on small savings schemes run by the Indian Postal Service. However, low rates of interest in the 1980s and 1990s encouraged the rise of several Ponzi schemes in speculative ventures such as Sanchayita Investments, Overland Investment Company, Verona Credit and Commercial Investment Company. Together, these scams eliminated close to ₹10 billion (US$100 million) in investor wealth. Despite a history of Ponzi schemes, the growth of similar companies was encouraged by the continuing decline in interest rates, rapid financialisation of household savings, lack of financial literacy and investor awareness, political patronage, absence of adequate legal deterrence, and regulatory arbitrage. These companies either raised their funds through legitimate channels such as collective investment schemes, non-convertible debentures and preference shares, or illegitimately through hoax financial instruments such as teak bonds, potato bonds or fictitious ventures in agro-export, construction and manufacturing. As of 2013, 80% of multi-level marketing and finance schemes against which complaints have been received are based in West Bengal, giving the state the title of "Ponzi capital of India". It is estimated that these Ponzi funds have amassed around ₹10 trillion (US$100 billion) from unsuspecting depositors in Eastern India.

== Modus operandi of Saradha ==
=== Key people ===
Sudipto Sen was the chairman and managing director of the Saradha Group. Sen was described as a soft-spoken, charming, and forceful orator. At the time of his arrest, he was in his mid-50s. In his youth, he was known as Shankaraditya Sen which he later changed to Sudipto Sen and may have had plastic surgery sometime in the 1990s, after which he became associated with land development projects in South Kolkata. The land bank he formed in around 2000 became the catalyst for enticing early customers into his Ponzi scheme.

Debjani Mukherjee was one of the executive directors of Saradha Group who could sign cheques on behalf of the group. She was arrested together with Sudipto Sen. At the time of her arrest Debjani was in her early 30s. She had studied at the St. John's Diocesan Girls' Higher Secondary School, and the Sivanath Sastri College. She trained as an air hostess. Mukherjee originally joined Saradha Group in 2010 as a receptionist, and rose rapidly to be the group's executive director. A story in India Today described her as a person with a reputation for generosity to her community.

=== Financial operations ===
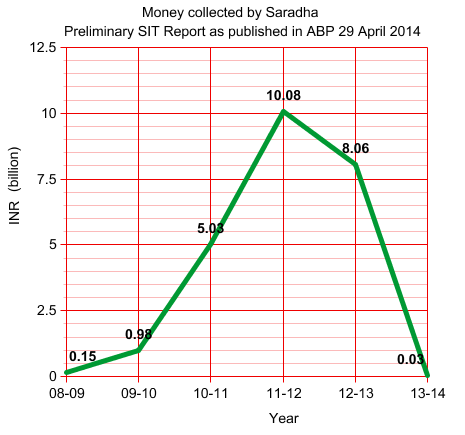
Money collected by Saradha Group of companies per year in billion INR. 95% of the fund was collected in the last three years of the scam. Source: 2014 SIT Report

The companies that were comprised by Saradha Group were incorporated in 2006. Its name is a cacography of Sarada Devi, the wife and spiritual counterpart of Ramakrishna Paramahamsa—a nineteenth-century mystic of Bengal. This duplicitous association gave Saradha Group a veneer of respectability. Like all Ponzi schemes, Saradha Group promised astronomical returns in fanciful but credible investments. Its funds were sold on commission by agents recruited from local rural communities. Between 25 and 40% of the deposit was returned to these agents as commissions and lucrative gifts to quickly build up a wide agent pyramid. The group used a nexus of companies to launder money and evade regulators.

Initially, the frontline companies collected money from the public by issuing secured debentures and redeemable preferential bonds. Under Indian Securities regulations and section 67 of the Indian Companies Act (1956), a company cannot raise capital from more than 50 people without issuing a proper prospectus and balance sheet. Its accounts must be audited and it must also have explicit permission to operate from the market regulator Securities and Exchange Board of India (SEBI).

SEBI first confronted Saradha Group in 2009. Saradha Group adapted by opening up to 200 new companies to create more cross-holdings. This created an extremely complex tiered corporate structure to confound SEBI by hampering their ability to consolidate blame. SEBI persisted in its investigation through 2010. Saradha Group reacted by changing its methods of raising capital. In West Bengal, Jharkhand, Assam and Chhattisgarh, it began operating variations of collective investment schemes (CIS) involving tourism packages, forward travel and hotel booking timeshare credit transfer, real estate, infrastructure finance, and motorcycle manufacturing. Investors were rarely informed about the true nature of their investments. Instead, many were told they would get high returns after a fixed period. With other investors, the investment was fraudulently sold in the form of a chit fund. Under the Chit Fund Act (1982), chit funds are regulated by state governments rather than SEBI.

SEBI warned the state government of West Bengal about Saradha Group's chit fund activities in 2011, again prompting Saradha Group to change its methods. This time, it acquired and sold large numbers of shares of various listed companies then embezzled the proceeds of the sale through accounts which as of September 2014 have not been identified. Meanwhile, Saradha Group started laundering a large portion of its funds to Dubai, South Africa and Singapore. By 2012, SEBI was able to classify the group's activities as collective investment schemes rather than chit funds—and demanded that it immediately stop operating its investment schemes until it received permission to operate from SEBI. Saradha Group did not comply with this ruling and continued to operate until its collapse in April 2013.

=== Building brand and non-financial businesses ===
Like previous Ponzi schemes such as Anubhav teak plantations, Japanlife, and Speakasia, Saradha Group invested heavily in the building of its brand. With enormous funds at its disposal, Saradha invested in high visibility sectors, such as the Bengali film industry, where it recruited actress and Trinamool Congress (TMC) Member of Parliament (MP) Satabdi Roy as its brand ambassador. Bollywood actor and TMC MP Mithun Chakraborty was brought in as the brand ambassador of Saradha Group's media platform.

Saradha Group also enlisted Kunal Ghosh, another TMC MP, as the CEO of the media group. Under Kunal Ghosh, the group acquired and established local television channels and newspapers, investing around ₹9.88 billion (US$100 million) in the media group. By 2013, it employed over 1,500 journalists and owned eight newspapers printed in five languages: Seven Sisters Post and Bengal Post (English dailies), Sakalbela and Kalom (Bengali dailies), Prabhat Varta (Hindi daily), Ajir Dainik Baturi (Assamese daily), Azad Hind (Urdu daily) and Parama (Bengali weekly magazine). It also owned Bengali news channels Tara Newz and Channel 10, Bengali general entertainment channels Tara Muzic and Tara Bangla, Punjabi general entertainment channel Tara Punjabi, an international channel aimed at the Indian diaspora, TV South East Asia and one FM radio station. Author Aparna Sen was made the editor of Parama.

In 2011, Saradha Group bought Global Automobiles, a heavily indebted motorcycle company as a front for the latest version of its Ponzi scheme. Global Automobiles immediately stopped most production but kept 150 workers on its payroll who "pretended to work whenever truckloads and busloads of prospective depositors of Saradha Realty visited the plant for a first-hand check before investing". It also bought similar shell companies like West Bengal Awadhoot Agro Private Ltd, located in North 24-Parganas, and Landmark Cement in Bankura to showcase them to agents and depositors and convince them that the Saradha Group had diversified interests.

As part of its corporate social responsibility program, Saradha Group donated motorcycles to the Kolkata Police. On 19 July 2011, it persuaded Mamata Banerjee, the Chief Minister of West Bengal, to use its ambulances and motorcycles for the Jangalmahal area of West Midnapore. To further etch itself in the socio-cultural milieu of Bengal, Saradha Group invested in football rivals and the best-known football clubs in Bengal: Mohun Bagan A.C. (₹ 18 million in 2010–11) and East Bengal F.C. (₹ 35 million since 2010). The group also sponsored various Durga Puja celebrations organised by local political leaders.

=== Political patronage ===
Allegedly several political leaders received financial support from Saradha Group, including MPs of TMC, the incumbent ruling party of West Bengal. MP Kunal Ghosh drew a salary of ₹1.6 million (US$17,000) per month from Saradha Group, as an employee of the group. MP Srinjoy Bose was directly involved with the group's media operations. Transport Minister Madan Mitra headed the employees' union of the group and publicly encouraged people to invest their savings with it. Sudipto Sen, the group's chairman and managing director, reportedly spent ₹18.6 million (US$190,000) to buy paintings by Mamata Banerjee, whose government later issued a notification that public libraries should buy and display Saradha Group newspapers. The group bought the loss-making company Landmark Cement, which was co-owned by textiles minister Shyamapada Mukherjee. The group also had financial dealings with Ganesh Dey, the confidential assistant of the finance minister of the erstwhile Left Front government, who was later expelled.

Politicians outside West Bengal also benefited from Saradha Group. Himanta Biswa Sarma, the Health and Education Minister of Assam, may have profited personally from the Ponzi scheme. According to officials investigating the case, the actual amount paid could be almost double of what is being claimed. Some commentators state that this Ponzi scheme survived for so long because of its heavy political patronage.

== Collapse ==
The earliest public warnings about the reckless and fraudulent CIS in West Bengal started in 2009 from MPs Somendra Nath Mitra and Abu Hasem Khan Choudhury and TMC leader Sadhan Pande. Apart from the CBI investigation, no executive actions were taken at this time. On 7 December 2012, Reserve Bank of India (RBI) governor Duvvuri Subbarao said the West Bengal government should initiate suo motu action against companies that were indulging in financial malpractice. By that time, the Saradha Group Ponzi scheme was already beginning to unravel. In January 2013, the group's cash inflow was, for the first time, less than its cash payouts. This outcome is inevitable in a Ponzi scheme that is allowed to run full course. Sudipto Sen tried but failed to calm uneasy depositors and agents, and could not increase inflow of funds.

On 6 April 2013, Sen wrote an 18-page confessional letter to the CBI, in which he admitted that he had paid large sums of money to several politicians. He also stated that TMC leader Kunal Ghosh had forced him to enter into loss-making media ventures and blackmailed him into selling one of his television channels at below market price. Sen fled after posting this letter on 10 April.

In his absence, the Ponzi scheme unravelled. On 17 April, around 600 collection agents claiming to be associated with Saradha Group assembled at the headquarters of TMC and demanded government intervention. Despondency quickly spread across Bengal. A Times of India interviewee said, "'The entire Dakshin Barasat today looks like it was hit by a cyclone. Every home has a bankrupt depositor or a fugitive agent. People who were once friends became enemies. Happy households became miserable. Students stopped going to school. Traders lost interest in opening shutters. There is a sense of treachery that has replaced the warmth of a neighbourhood. Suddenly everything has become vicious." By this time, the Saradha Group financial scandal had colloquially become known as "Bonzi"—a portmanteau of the words Ponzi and Bengal.

On 18 April, an arrest warrant for Sudipto Sen was issued. By 20 April, the news of potentially the largest Ponzi scheme in India had become headline news in West Bengal, and then front-page news nationally. After evading the authorities for a week, Sudipto Sen, Debjani Mukherjee and Arvind Singh Chauhan were arrested in Sonmarg, Kashmir, on 23 April 2013. On the same day, SEBI stated that both chain marketing and forward contracts are forms of CIS, and officially asked Saradha Group to immediately desist from raising any further capital and return all deposits within three months.

== Aftermath and reactions ==
=== State government reaction ===
==== West Bengal ====
On 22 April 2013 the Mamata Banerjee led West Bengal government announced that a four-member judicial inquiry commission headed by Shyamal Kumar Sen, retired Chief Justice of the Allahabad High Court, would probe the scam. The commission was named the Justice Shyamal Sen Commission of Enquiry (Saradha Group of Companies and other similar companies). West Bengal's Chief Minister Mamata Banerjee was reported to have said, "ja gechhey ta gechhey" (whatever has gone has gone). On 24 April 2013, Banerjee announced a controversial ₹500 crore (US$52 million) relief fund for the low income depositors of the Saradha Group, introducing a 10% additional tax on tobacco products to raise the money and in jest asked smokers "to light up a little more". The propriety of the fund was later questioned by the Governor of RBI. The West Bengal government also set up a Special Investigation Team (SIT) u/s 36 of the CrPC, with officers drawn from the state's CID and Kolkata Police, to pool the criminal cases and investigate the Saradha Group. Mamata Banerjee led State Government staunchly opposed all investigations by federal investigative agencies CBI, ED and SFIO; conceding only after the Supreme Court ordered the federal agencies to take up the investigation.

The state government decided to repeal an existing Bill passed by the Left Front Government in 2009, which had not received the approval of the President of India. On 30 April 2013 the new Bill—The West Bengal Protection of Interest of Depositors in Financial Establishments Bill (2013), was passed in a two-day special session of the West Bengal Legislative Assembly. The new law has provisions for retrospective effect, search and seizure, enhanced penalties, establishment of special courts and confiscation of property. As the Bill pertained to the Concurrent List of the Indian Constitution, on which a federal law was already in place, it required approval from the President. The Bill was sent to the Union Home Ministry, which sent it back to the West Bengal Assembly on 6 June 2013, stating that the Bill has penal provisions implemented with retrospective effect, thus contravening the Basic structure doctrine of the Indian constitution and the established criminal law jurisprudence. On 12 December 2013, the West Bengal Legislative Assembly passed an amended version of the original Bill, incorporating changes suggested by the financial services, and revenue and economic affairs departments in New Delhi. The new Bill was then sent for presidential approval.

On 8 May 2013, Banerjee said West Bengal was considering setting up a government-backed small savings fund to encourage small depositors to invest in it rather than in Ponzi schemes. Doubts whether a cash-starved state with high debt burden has the financial acumen or political will to independently administer such a fund.

On 23 May 2013, Bannerjee indicated the West Bengal government's willingness to take over Saradha-owned television channels Tara News and Tara Muzic, which had earlier been sent into administration by Calcutta High Court.

==== Assam ====
On 4 April 2013, the Assam Legislative Assembly unanimously passed the Assam Protection of Interests of Depositors (in Financial Establishments) (Amendment) Bill (2013) to enhance the protections available to depositors and to curb fraudulent financial schemes. Soon after the Saradha scam, Assam Government sent the Bill to the State Governor for his approval so it could be forwarded to President of India for his assent.

On 22 April 2013, Assam Police sealed five offices of Saradha Group amid protests by depositors, agents and employees, and accusations that a minister, a former DGP and government officials had facilitated the group's business ventures in Assam. Unlike in West Bengal, where the probe is based on FIRs filed by defrauded depositors, the Assam Government suo motto registered 222 cases against Saradha Group and 127 other companies after widespread protests in Assam. In 17 cases, charge sheets have been filed against 42 people belonging to 15 companies. 303 people have been arrested for embezzling public money. The government seized nearly ₹9.4 million (US$98,000) in cash from those arrested. 106 bank accounts with deposits of ₹240 million (US$2.5 million) were frozen while a number of plots totalling more than 99 bighas and buildings have been identified; steps were taken for their attachment. On 6 May 2013, Assam handed the investigation to CBI.

==== Odisha ====
On the basis of complaints filed by over 6000 depositors mainly from districts adjoining Bengal, the Government of Odisha ordered the Crime Branch of Odisha Police to investigate the Saradha scam. The Economic Offence Wing (EOW) of the Crime Branch of Odisha Police registered criminal cases against Sudipto Sen and Saradha Group. On 3 May 2013, Odisha police seized documents and sealed the group's local offices. During the transfer of the investigation to CBI in May 2014, EOW had registered up to 207 cases relating to 43 of the group's 44 companies and had arrested 440 people. Charge sheets for cheating and criminal conspiracy were filed in 120 cases under provisions of the Indian Penal Code, the Prize Chits and Money Circulation Schemes (Banning) Act, and the Odisha Protection of Interest of Depositors (in Financial Establishments) Act.

==== Tripura ====
On 9 May 2013, the Government of Tripura handed over all the cases involving deposit-collecting companies in the state to CBI and the Income Tax Department.

=== Central government reaction ===
In March 2013, Central corporate affairs minister Sachin Pilot said in the Lok Sabha—the lower house of the Parliament of India—that his ministry has received complaints against West Bengal's Saradha Group and many other companies for their involvement in Ponzi or multi-layer-marketing schemes. No action was taken until after the fraud was uncovered, when many measures were announced. On 25 April 2013, India's Income Tax department and Ministry of Corporate Affairs started separate investigation into the Saradha affair and similar Ponzi funds masquerading as NBFCs or CISs. On the same day, the Enforcement Directorate (ED) registered a money laundering case under the provisions of the Prevention of Money Laundering Act (PMLA) at its Guwahati office because the Assam police has registered an FIR against Saradha Group to investigate depositors' allegations of financial irregularities. On 1 May 2013, commenting on the regulatory loopholes, the Chairman of SEBI said, "there should be one single regulator for entire collective investment schemes".

On 7 May 2013, the Central Government set up an inter-ministerial group with members of the corporate affairs ministry, SEBI, Reserve Bank of India and officers from the Income Tax Department. The group is intended to unify the regulations of investment schemes by NBFCs, banks and companies, which As of 2013 were governed by different laws and regulations, leading to regulatory loopholes. In light of the fraud, SEBI requested sweeping powers to investigate and prosecute fraudulent CISs. In August 2013, the Central Government amended the SEBI Act and gave SEBI powers to search and seize without prior magisterial permission to investigate illegal money collection schemes.

=== Political reactions and protests ===
The crash of the Ponzi scheme and the publication of Sudipto Sen's letter led to a barrage of cross-party accusations. CPM accused TMC of associating with the 'chit fund', TMC alleged that Union Minister of Finance's wife Nalini Chidambaram had taken lawyers' fees from Saradha Group to incorporate its companies and should be investigated. TMC blamed CPM for letting Ponzi funds grow in Bengal.

The Saradha scandal became a major campaign issue amongst the political parties in West Bengal during the 2014 national election. Allegations were made by all the political parties in the state. While the CPM, Congress and BJP again accused TMC of facilitating and profiting from the fraud, TMC said the companies were allowed to register during the government run by CPM in the state and Congress in the centre. Mamata Bannerjee, Chief Minister of West Bengal and Chairperson of TMC, attacked P. Chidambaram, the finance minister of the central government, alleging a political vendetta in the timing—coinciding with the parliamentary elections—of a spurt in Enforcement Directorate investigation. More political controversy occurred when Narendra Modi, the prime ministerial candidate, said Mamata Bannerjee may have directly benefited from the Ponzi scheme when her paintings were allegedly bought for ₹1.8 crore (US$190,000) by the Saradha Group. TMC replied to the allegations, threatened legal action for defamation and called Modi the "Butcher of Gujarat". On 11 September 2014, West Bengal law minister Chandrima Bhattacharya led around 100 TMC women supporters in a sit-in protest against CBI, alleging a biased and "politically motivated probe".

Street protests broke out across West Bengal, during some of which protesters ransacked offices of various Ponzi funds. The agents and depositors of several money mobilising funds in West Bengal organised themselves into the Chit Fund Sufferers Unity Forum (CFSUF) and demanded swift investigation and the reimbursement of deposits. The Forum engaged in several, high-visibility, disruptive protests; it was allegedly threatened and intimidated by TMC, the ruling political party.

According to media reports, around 210 agents, depositors and executives or directors of various money pooling companies have committed suicide in the aftermath of the Saradha Group's collapse.

=== International reaction ===
In September 2014, Bengali newspaper Anandabazar Patrika, citing several domestic and foreign intelligence reports, published a series of articles reporting that Saradha Group through Ahmed Hassan Imran, a TMC MP and founder member of Student Islamic Movement of India, engaged Jamaat-e-Islami, a Bangladeshi extremist organisation, to move money out of India. Jamaat-e-Islami used its brokerage from the laundering operation to fuel its militant protests against the war crime trials of its founders and destabilise the Awami League government in Bangladesh.

In response to the expose, the Government of Bangladesh, led by Sheikh Hasina, ordered the formation of a commission to further investigate the matter. Mamata Bannerjee summoned the Deputy High Commissioner of Bangladesh to lodge a protest for an alleged protocol violation for "selective leaks in media". During subsequent bilateral meetings, Bangladesh Foreign Minister Abul Hassan Mahmud Ali conveyed deep apprehensions about funding for terrorists flowing from India to Bangladesh to Ajit Doval, the Indian National Security Advisor (NSA). Bangladeshi human rights activist Shahriar Kabir also raised concerns about Saradha funds being moved through an extremist organisation to terrorist organisations like Al Qaeda.

=== Judicial reactions ===
On 22 April 2013, separate Public Interest Litigations (PIL) were filed in Guwahati High Court by RTI activist Akhil Gogoi and in Calcutta High Court by advocate Basabi Roy Chowdhury and subsequently by advocate Rabi Sankar Chattopadhyay and Bikas Ranjan Bhattacharya, both seeking CBI investigation against the Saradha Group and other chit fund companies. On 25 April, responding to the PIL, a division bench of Calcutta High Court comprising Chief Justice Arun Kumar Mishra and Justice Joymalya Bagchi said that because the ramifications of the scam included other states, a central agency would do justice to the investigation. The court gave state government one week to submit its investigation report to see whether the probe was being conducted in a fair manner. On 7 May 2013, Calcutta High Court appointed a three-member administrator group to run Tara News and Tara Muzic. The High Court then allowed the SIT to continue with the investigation and ordered it to submit a timely progress report before the court. The petitioners were dissatisfied with the order and appealed to the Supreme Court of India in July 2013 via a Special Leave Petition (SLP). Before the Supreme Court the Government of West Bengal stated that the investigation into the scam was being successfully conducted by the SIT.

The state governments of Orissa, Jharkhand and Tripura, which were respondent to the case, requested a CBI enquiry. The SC bench led by Justice T.S. Thakur and Justice C. Nagappan in April 2014 said the Supreme Court may order a CBI probe into all money collection entities in India. On 9 May 2014, the same bench of the Supreme Court ordered CBI to investigate all Ponzi schemes, including Saradha, in Eastern India. The Court also clarified the concurrent attachment and auction of the assets of suspected Ponzi companies to reimburse depositors at the end of the judicial proceedings initiated by Enforcement Directorate authorised under federal laws and various state agencies authorised under state laws would also run parallel to the CBI investigation.

=== Economic effects ===
Graph shows the fall of savings in government schemes with the rise of Ponzi funds (figures on y axis are in Crores INR)

Companies illegally moving deposits diverted an estimated sum of ₹240 billion (US$2.5 billion) from small savings funds promoted by state government since 2010. Official data show a steady decline in small-savings deposits and a rise in withdrawals, which left a reduced amount from which the state government could borrow. This affected the overall macroeconomic situation of the state; instead of being used by government for public funding, the money went into Ponzi schemes that were either diverted to foreign locations or were put to use for private gains.

It was feared that legitimate non-banking financial companies and micro finance institutions would be stigmatised, leading to a vicious cycle of low depositor trust, higher interest rates, lower lending and a localised credit crisis. Because most of the Saradha Group depositors came from the lowest economic strata, the loss of the investment would cause a further decrease in social mobility. The scandal drew attention to similar illegal deposit mobilising companies, which are facing increased regulatory pressure. Many of these companies have been variations of time share travel schemes, of which there are few clear regulations. These companies tried to register as cooperative societies to continue their financial operations.

== Criminal prosecution and ongoing investigations ==
=== Special Investigation Team (SIT), West Bengal Police ===
FIR was filed against Sudipto Sen and Kunal Ghosh on 14 April 2013. Around six officials from Saradha Group were arrested. The investigation was headed by the detective department of Bidhannagar police. The investigation was widened to include other Ponzi funds. Kunal Ghosh and other Ponzi fund officials from Saradha were repeatedly questioned by police to determine the true assets of the company and other facets of the fraud. Ghosh was arrested by SIT in November 2013 after he posted a list of 12 names on his Facebook page; these included at least four TMC MPs and West Bengal Chief Minister Mamata Banerjee.

As per the initial SIT reports, Saradha Group had mobilised ₹2,459.59 crore (US$260 million) through issuance of its policies. By April 2014, around 385 FIRs against Sardha Group, in which SIT filed 288 chargesheets, had been filed. 453 FIRs were filed against other money pooling companies and Ponzi funds, and 75 charge sheets were filed before the court.

Since 2 May 2013, after complaints from depositors, state government ordered SIT to broaden its investigation and conduct search and seizure at offices of MPS Greenery Developers Ltd and Prayag Infotech Hi-Rise Ltd, which were running unregistered collective investment schemes similar to Saradha Group. By 6 May 2013, police had arrested directors of Ponzi companies ATM Group and Annex Infrastructure Pvt Ltd on charges of defrauding depositors. According to news-reports, at the time of handing the Saradha Group investigation to CBI, SIT had arrested 11 people, had traced 224 immovable properties, seized 54 vehicles and had filed charge sheet in almost 300 pending cases.

=== Justice Shyamal Sen Commission ===
By mid-August 2013, the Justice Shyamal Sen Commission finished its initial compilation of the list of claimants. Around 1.74 million depositors filed claims with the commission, of which 83% invested ₹10,000 (US$100) or less. The Commission recommended that West Bengal state government sell the assets of Saradha Group and proportionally distribute the returns among defrauded investors. By April 2014, the commission had refunded 400,000 depositors who had invested less than ₹10,000. Rs. 185 crore was refunded to the depositors. The commission received claims from 500,000 depositors who were defrauded by Ponzi funds other than Saradha; the Commission did not refund any of these depositors. In April 2014, Calcutta High Court sought a report from the commission on the discriminatory standards being applied to the refunding of depositors.

=== Central agencies ===
On 30 April 2013 CBI started investigating into the Saradha Group scandal in Assam at the request of the state government. Chief Minister of Tripura said Tripura may also order a CBI probe into Saradha Group.

In West Bengal, because the criminal investigation had not initially been handed over to the CBI, the Enforcement Directorate (ED)—a Central Government agency which primarily probes money laundering—led the investigation on behalf of the Central Government. In April 2014, ED arrested the absconding wife, son and daughter-in-law of Sudipta Sen, all of whom had been directors of various companies of Saradha Group. ED also questioned TMC MPs Ahmad Hassan and Arpita Ghosh about their financial transactions with Saradha Group. ED alleged that West Bengal police has not cooperated with it and obstructed its investigation.

In May 2014, the Supreme Court transferred all investigations into 44 deposit-mobilising companies—including Saradha Group—suspected of running Ponzi schemes in the states of West Bengal, Odisha, Assam, Jharkhand and Tripura, to CBI. As per Supreme Court's order Bengal SIT handed over all arrested suspects including Sudipto Sen, Debjani Mukherjee and Kunal Ghosh over to CBI. CBI questioned several prominent personalities who were connected with Saradha Group; some—including TMC vice president and former Director General of Police (DGP) in West Bengal Rajat Majumdar, Assamese singer and filmmaker Sadananda Gogoi and former advocate general of Odisha Ashok Mohanty. Former Assam DGP Shankar Barua who was a suspect in the Saradha scandal and whose house was searched by CBI, committed suicide. On 21 November 2014 CBI arrested Srinjoy Bose, another TMC parliamentarian in connection with the scam. On 12 December 2014, CBI arrested West Bengal Transport minister Madan Mitra on the charges of criminal conspiracy, cheating, misappropriation and deriving undue financial benefits from the Saradha Group.

In February 2019, the CBI interrogated Kolkata Police Commissioner Rajeev Kumar for 39 hours over five days in Shillong. This followed a political controversy when the CBI team who had gone to question him had been detained in Kolkata. They were later released and even as CM Mamata Bannerjee was protesting on dharna against the arrest of Kumar, the Supreme court ordered interrogation of Rajeev Kumar at a location outside West Bengal to avoid further showdown. In March 2019, the CBI filed a plea in Supreme court against telecom operators Vodafone and Airtel alleging their non cooperation in the scam investigation probe. On 17 May 2021, CBI arrested Firhad Hakim, Subrata Mukherjee, Sovan Chatterjee and Madan Mitra on the charges they took the bribes from Saradha Narada after West Bengal Governor Jagdeep Dhankar gave the permission to arrest the ministers(Firhad Hakim, Subrata Mukherjee) and one MLA (Madan Mitra) and former MLA(Sovan Chatterjee).

=== Convictions and sentences ===
In February 2014, Sudipta Sen was convicted in a case where he was charged, under various provisions of employment law, as a director of Saradha Group for his failure to deposit with the provident fund authorities INR 0.03 million that his firm owed to its employees; he was sentenced by the trial court to three years in jail, it was the first conviction in a series of civil and criminal cases, relating to corporate fraud and non-payment of deposits, pending against him.

Later, Sudipta Sen wrote a letter to Prime Minister Narendra Modi and West Bengal Chief Minister Mamata Banerjee, where he mentioned names of several political leaders who took money from him. Sen, in his letter dated 1 December 2020, named Suvendu Adhikari, Mukul Roy, Adhir Ranjan Chowdhury, Sujan Chakraborty and Biman Bose as beneficiaries from the Saradha group. On 24 January Abhishek Banerjee exposed the letter accusing Suvendu Adhikari of extorting Rs. 6 crore from chit fund agency. He said "You (Suvendu) not only took Rs. 6 crore from Sudipta Sen, but also blackmailed him. In the letter, is clearly written that the night before he (Sen) went at large, you visited his office and took money from him." On 1 February Bankshall Court gave order to CBI for investigation of Sudipta Sen's letter. Kunal Ghosh wrote a letter to Home Minister Amit Shah in demand of arresting Mukul Roy and Suvendu Adhikari for money laundering scandal and Shah accepted that he had received the letter.

== See also ==
- List of scandals in India
- Corruption in India
- Rose Valley financial scandal
- Pyramid scheme
- The Lokpal Bill, 2011
- 2011 Indian anti-corruption movement
- Jan Lokpal Bill
- Speak Asia scam
