= Menyinkwa =

Menyinkwa is located in Kenya, Nyanza Province, Kisii county along Kisii-Kilgoris road approximately 5 km or 5 minute drive from Kisii town It is a neighbourhood of middle-class inhabitants who are Abaganda, Abanyamoyio, Abao'riango and some Abanyamasicho. The majority of the inhabitants are Kisiis from other regions and locals who are involved in business and farming. It is a hub of activities with bars, shopping centres, self-help chamas, youth organizations and football clubs; notably Menyinkwa zone FC boda boda team

== Origin ==
The name 'Menyinkwa' originates from a plant called 'Omonyikwa' which grew naturally in large scale at the area. People from far came here to look for the leaves of the plant for its medicinal use.

== Legacies ==
Talking of the popular kisii saying "Motembe nsago nchiao" then you would never go wrong without mentioning Menyinkwa as the Omotembe tree which held cure for mumps once grew here albeit it is now extinct .
