= Tanomoshiko =

Tanomoshiko (also spelt Tanomoshi-ko or Tanomosiko) (Japanese: 頼母子講) ("reliable group") is a variety of rotating savings and credit association (ROSCA) found in Japan. Historically these associations played a major role in the economic life of Japan and among the Japanese diaspora, and still survive on an informal basis in some parts of the country.

== Name ==
Tanomoshi or Tanomoshiko (頼母子講) has also been called mujin (無尽) or moai (模合) in Japan. The name may be derived from tanomu meaning begging, or from tayori ni naru mono meaning reliance.

== History ==
Tanomoshi, denoting a locally organized social finance scheme, has existed in Japan at least since the middle Kamakura period (1185–1333). The principle was that each member would contribute a sum at regular intervals and would receive a single payment when their turn came round; it required mutual trust among those involved. The institution facilitated personal savings, investment in property and enterprise, insurance, personal loans and assistance of poorer people. By the Tokugawa period (1603–1868) tanomoshi was widespread. During the later 19th century under the Meiji, commercial banks developed, but as the banks were reluctant to offer small-scale and personal banking services they did not altogether supersede tanomoshi, which were incorporated into mutually financed mujin companies in 1915. Neither was tanomoshi fully replaced by state social security when it was implemented in the early 20th century. The system also operated among Japanese immigrants to the United States and Brazil, helping them in establishing new businesses there. Indeed while it diminished in Japan itself it remained of great importance to overseas Japanese communities.

The institution went into decline after World War II, with the further growth of commercial banks and social security and the loosening of community bonds, but still exists in some parts of Japan. During the 1970s there were estimated to be 20–30 tanomoshi groups involving economically better-off members of Buraku communities.

== Current ==
Tanomoshi still functions in certain areas, especially Kyushu and Okinawa. For example, in Okinawa prefecture, tanomoshi is active under the name of moai, and a local currency called Moai Cho has been sold in a stationery store (e.g., Editorial Team for Encyclopedia to Know Okinawa, 2000; Shimokawa, 2006). In Aizu region of Fukushima prefecture, tanomoshi called mujin has supported savings for leisure mainly in restaurants once a month (e.g., Kimura, 2001). However, in general, it is considered that traditional financial services based on mutual help and solidarity is not necessary anymore. Instead, consumer loans emerged as a new way to borrow money.

Most tanomoshiko are organized within a workplace or among friends. The members may use the funds built up to finance a trip or a banquet. It is most used by members of social minorities who are less prone to borrow money from financial institutions. The institution has little or no legal status.
