= Seven Sisters Post =

- Type: Daily newspaper
- Format: Broadsheet
- Owner: Saradha Group
- Founded: November 11, 2011
- Ceased publication: 2013
- Language: Indian English
- Headquarters: Guwahati

Seven Sisters Post was an Indian English-language newspaper published from Guwahati. It was first launched on 11 November 2011, by Saradha Printing and Publications Pvt. Ltd.

The newspaper mainly covered news of north-eastern India. Every Sunday a supplement was published, with the main newspaper dedicated to creative writing, including poetry, essays and stories.

The newspaper is closed and its website has also expired due to Saradha Group chit fund scam.

== See also ==
- The Assam Tribune
- The Sentinel
- The Times of India
