= Susu (informal loan club) =

Type of informal savings and credits

A susu or sou-sou or osusu or asue (also known as a merry-go-round, Partner, or Pawdna in Jamaica; sol in Haiti; san in Dominican Republic; and Njangi in Cameroon) is a form of rotating savings and credit association, a type of informal savings club arrangement between a small group of people who take turns by throwing hand, as members call it. The name is used in Africa (especially West Africa) and the Caribbean. Each member of the group periodically contributes the same amount of money to a common fund; the total contributions are then disbursed to a single member of the group. After each period, the recipient changes so that every member eventually has the opportunity to be a recipient of funds. Participants of a susu do not make a profit. Instead, small periodic contributions are combined into a larger lump sum of the same total value, with the susu acting as a savings club.

== Overview ==
A member who receives a distribution early on effectively receives a loan. They collect a larger sum of money early and "repay" as they make contributions going forward. A member who receives a distribution toward the end of a rotation has effectively been "saving" their contributions leading up to the disbursal.

Traditionally the arrangement is conducted in cash and without any interest charged. The organizer of the sou-sou may be compensated for their efforts as a courtesy. Since a sou-sou is not a written or legal contract it relies on personal trust to discourage malfeasance. For this reason it is more likely that the participants are members of the same community and know each other.

The concept of a susu is used throughout the world and has over 200 different names that vary from country to country. The funds are generally gathered with a set amount contributed from family or friends each week. An estimated three quarters of Caribbean immigrants in New York participated in susus during the 1980s.

== Susu scams ==
The "Blessing Loom" is identical to the classic "airplane game" pyramid scheme, with a circular diagram obscuring the pyramid structure.

Scammers have set up pyramid schemes which imitate or pretend to be susus. In contrast to traditional susus (in which participants only receive the money they put in without profit), these schemes promise a profit. Additionally, these scheme promise rewards for recruiting more people to the susu, in effect making it a pyramid scheme.

These fake susu scams (also known as "blessing looms" or "gifting circles") increased during the 2020 COVID pandemic, and are often targeted to African-Americans under the guise of being the traditional African and Caribbean practice.

== See also ==
- Osusu
- Susu account
- Tanda, the Latin American version of the system
- Rotating savings and credit association
- Hui (informal loan club)
- Christmas club, a one-person version of saving small amounts with a predetermined payout date
