= Susu collectors =

Financial intermediaries from Africa and Caribbean

Susu collectors are a traditional form of financial intermediaries in Africa, predominantly in Ghana. For a small fee they provide an informal means for Ghanaians to securely save and access their own money, and gain some limited access to credit, a form of microfinance. Money looked after for an individual by a Susu collector is held in a Susu account.

The susu informal accounts used in the Caribbean and among West Indian immigrants to the United States are similar.

== History ==
In the Akan language susu means "plan". In this context, planning with a group of people to save a certain amount of money. The concept is also known in Jamaica as Paadna Money(Partner Money) or simply as Paadna.

The 1990s saw significant growth in the number of clients per susu collector in other African countries, and growth in the size of individual deposits, according to Aryeetey and Udry (1995). Today, Susu collectors provide many Ghanaians who would otherwise be denied credit with access to money they need to start up small venture projects that in many cases benefit the community as a whole.

== Banking sector ==
According to the Overseas Development Institute, the banking sector in Ghana is made up of the central bank, eight commercial banks, three development banks, three merchant banks and 133 rural banks. With the exception of the rural banks, their distribution is weighted towards urban areas, and towards the south. Seven out of the thirteen districts in the Northern Region have no banks and the ratio of clients to banks in northern Ghana is much higher (100,000:1) than in the country as a whole (16,000-26,000:1).

The semi-formal financial sector in Ghana includes Credit Unions, Savings and Credit Co-operatives and a number of NGOs. Informal financial agents include: moneylenders; susu collectors (savings mobilisers); traders, agricultural processors and input distributors; susu groups/ROSCAs (Rotating Savings and Credit Associations), and friends and relatives.

Susu collectors are represented by an apex organisation, with whom 850 are registered, though it is estimated another 150 unregistered collectors operate in the North.

Whereas banks in Ghana offer high-value, long-term loans, Susu collectors can offer low-value advances or credit in the short term (usually less than a month) that is interest free. If larger sums are required, and they know the client personally, they can offer credit at higher rates than the banks, but without collateral to secure the loan.

The Ghana Co-operative Susu Collectors Association (GCSCA) established in 1990, has been trying to mobilize, organize, and regulate the operations of Susu collectors whose activities are sometimes fraudulent.

Some Third World charities such as Action Aid, work closely with Susu collectors, using them to efficiently distribute financial information and loans funded by the charity.

== Operation ==
Susu collectors usually run their businesses from kiosks located in the market place and act as mobile bankers. Otherwise they can often be recognized by their distinctive coats with many pockets.

Deposits, often of low but regular value, are usually taken on a daily basis over the course of a month. At the end of this period the susu collector returns the accumulated savings to the client but keeps one day's savings as commission. Susu collectors may also provide advances to their clients.

== Susu collectors vs. mutual Susu ==
The word susu is also used in reference to rotating savings and credit associations in Ghana and the Caribbean. K. Little's 1957 article in American Anthropology, as well as the book Traditional Peoples of the World by National Geographic describes susu groups in this context. Both Aryeetey and Gockel (1991) and Little (1957) are cited by Ellen Bortei-Doku and Ernest Aryeetey in Chapter 5 of the 1995 edited volume, Money-go-rounds.
