= Hui (informal loan club) =

Informal savings scheme

Hui (traditional Chinese: 會; simplified Chinese: 会; pinyin: huì; Vietnamese: hụi; lit. 'group, association') refers to a group-based rotating saving and credit scheme that is popular among many immigrant and migrant communities throughout the United States and Taiwan. Biao Hui (simplified Chinese: 标会; traditional Chinese: 標會; pinyin: biāo huì; lit. 'to bid in Hui', Vietnamese: chơi hụi, lit. 'to play in Hui') is the verb when someone is engaging or participating in Hui.

== Process ==
The basic premise of the model is a group of close friends and family members coming together once a month and contributing a fixed amount of the money into a money pool. Every time, one member of the group will be chosen to withdraw the entire lump sum from the pool, often for purpose of down payments towards houses or cars or to start a new business. When the same group of people comes together again in the subsequent month contributing the same fixed amount, another member of the group will be chosen to take the lump sum. This process is repeated until every member in the group had a chance to withdraw the lump sum in a given month. Contributions can involve not only money but also tradable assets like gold or rice, particularly in rural Vietnamese contexts.

== Role of the leader ==
A hui is typically initiated by a trusted individual within a community who assumes the role of group leader, responsible for recruiting and approving members; while participants may recommend friends or relatives, final approval rests with the leader. In Vietnam the leader (chủ hụi) is often a woman who organizes groups within family or community networks, emphasizing trust and social ties, and may receive a commission for management. The group leader bears liability for fraud, embezzlement, or default, and if a member fails to meet obligations the leader is expected to cover the losses to protect the group. Leaders often host meetings at their residence to collect contributions and manage borrowing requests, and are commonly granted priority access to pooled funds as compensation for the associated risk and administrative work.

== Differences to other schemes ==
Unlike similar schemes in other cultures, where all the savings and borrowing among the group members are interest-free and the order of the withdraw are determined by the group leader, Hui adopts a market-driven interest rate approach: In any given month, all members currently interested in taking the money pot have to submit an interest amount they are willing to pay to the group. Typically the person who is ready to pay the highest interest will receive the pot, with the interest amount being evenly disbursed among the other group members. Typically, the interest payments are higher and more competitive during the early months of the Hui, and tend to decrease towards the end of the Hui.

== Risks ==
Common issues include defaults, where a member fails to contribute after receiving the pot, or fraud, such as the organizer absconding ("giật hụi" in Vietnamese). Scheme collapses ("bể hụi" or "vỡ hụi") have led to losses of billions of VND in Vietnam, often in rural areas where participants lack written agreements. In the US, cases among Korean and Chinese immigrants have resulted in financial losses and damaged relationships.

== Legality ==
=== Vietnam ===
Hui is legally recognized under Article 471 of the 2015 Civil Code, with interest capped at 20% annually.

== Online model ==
Digital platforms have modernized hui, with apps like Esusu, eMoneyPool, and Mission Asset Fund offering features such as payment protection, credit reporting, and group fund management. In Vietnam, e-wallets like MoMo and ZaloPay include group features that have been adapted for online hui, though this has led to misuse and fraud cases.

== See also ==
- Collaborative finance
- Mutualism (movement)
- Solidarity lending
- Susu (informal loan club)
