= Arisan =

An arisan is a form of Rotating Savings and Credit Association in Indonesian culture, a form of Microfinance.

Generally the arisan is a social gathering that takes place at a fixed interval (this being an informal social network this may be variable), at each member's home in turn. The rotating arisan holder (drawn by lots) receives payment from each other member and provides food for those members. In the course of the arisan the amount paid to other members will equal the amount received when the arisan is held.

The arisan can vary from an essential form of credit in poorer social circles, funding an otherwise unaffordable business venture, wedding, or large purchase, to a purely social gathering for rich housewives with the money incidental (although the amounts can be considerable). As a source of finance it represents an alternative to bank loans and other forms of credit.

In general, no interest is payable per se in the arisan, and forms vary regionally within Indonesia. In some cases the arisan lacks a social element and is simply a means of circulating money between members; in this case the arisan may take the form of an 'arisan call', known as 'julu julu' or 'jula jula' in Sumatra. The arisan call involves an auction element, whereby the member receiving the payout each week is determined not by lot, but by bid, those willing to wait till the end of the arisan receiving the largest payout, while more desperate borrowers will receive less, but get money earlier.
