= Kitty party =

Informal savings club

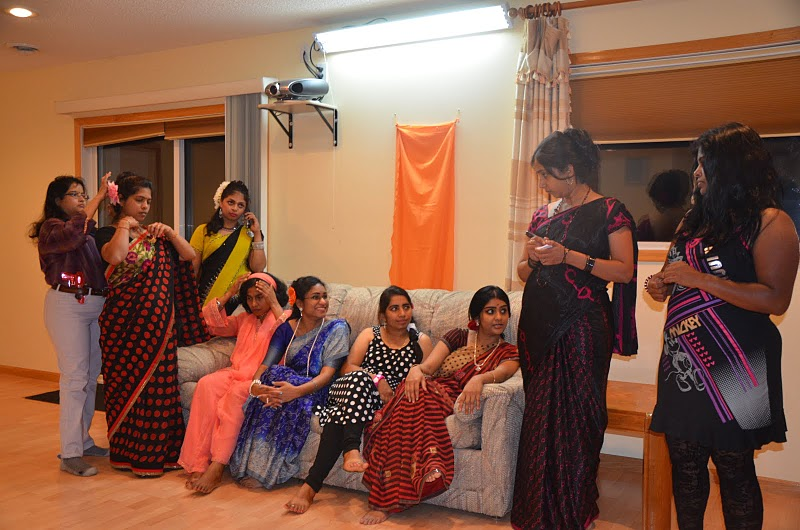
Guests at a kitty party

In India, a kitty party is a social event held as part of an informal savings club. It is a kind of party usually organized by women, and commonly held in the afternoon on a monthly basis.

== History ==
Kitty parties began in India during the early 1950s, in the aftermath of the 1947 partition. Initially, the informal savings events were hosted at home by middle-class women in northern Indian states, such as Punjab or Uttar Pradesh, whose families were struggling to recover financially from the turmoil caused by partition. Alongside the financial aspect, kitty parties also created a valuable social outlet for women, many of whom were not culturally permitted to work or travel much outside the home.

By the 1980s, the growth of consumerism in Indian society meant that kitty parties had evolved and were also becoming popular with wealthier women, who used it as a way to save for more expensive household items. Kitty parties continue to be popular in India today, and can be found in other South Asian countries and in parts of the world where Indian diaspora communities have formed, such as Singapore, the United Kingdom, and the United States. While the events are still primarily organized by groups of women, some modern variations have included couples and family kitty parties, which allow partners and children to participate, and the emergence of men's kitty parties.

== Organization and entertainment ==
Kitty refers to the amount collected at the party, every member contributing a certain sum of money each month. The kitty is handed over to one member of the group every month. Chit funds operate along similar principles, and the chit-fund association of India has estimated there are thousands of Indian companies that include management of kitty party funds as part of their services, although these companies tend to be interested only in higher value kitty party funds.

It is usually held at a specified time each month, by a specific group of women. Every member of the group has to host a party at least once. The hosting member organizes food and other logistics. In most of India and Pakistan, it is usually simply referred to as a 'committee'.

At meetings, members may share personal stories, business tips, family recipes, or general "skills and hacks." Entertainment can include guest speakers, cooking demonstrations, themed costume parties, parlour games, tarot card readings, and more.
