= Puber Kalom =

Indian newspaper

Puber Kalom পুবের কলম

- Front page of 12 February 2020
- Type: Daily Newspaper
- Format: Broadsheet
- Editor-in-chief: Ahmed Hassan Imran
- Language: Bengali (বাংলা)
- Headquarters: Kolkata, India
- Circulation: 24891 daily as per DAVP (as of Jul-Dec, 2019)
- Website: www.puberkalom.com epaper.puberkalom.com

Puber Kalom (Bengali: পুবের কলম) is an Indian Bengali language daily newspaper published in Kolkata, West Bengal. Its editor is Ahmed Hassan Imran who is a former member of Rajya Sabha from West Bengal.

== History ==
Kalom was launched as a monthly magazine in 1981. It became a weekly in 1983. The Saradha Group bought it in 2011 and turned it into a daily newspaper with a circulation of up to 40,000.

In 2013 after the Saradha Group financial scandal it was again bought by Kalom Welfare Association.
