= Likelemba =

Type of ROSCA in Africa

Likelemba is an African solidarity savings mechanism, a type of ROSCA (rotating savings and credit association), where several members put a certain sum of money in a "pot" and, every month, the total amount contained in the pot is then disbursed to one of the participating members.

== Example ==
Twelve people - typically women - put 100€ every month in their "likelemba pot".

- Month 1, member 1 - normally chosen by chance - gets 11 x 100€ = 1,100 €.
- Month 2, another member gets elected and rewarded with the 1,100 €, etc.

== Benefits ==
The secret of the success of likelemba is its simplicity and formula whereby a lot of small amounts that every member can easily spare make one big prize. The winner has a fairly large amount with which he/she can do something extraordinary and, hopefully, break out of a financial circle of misery or difficult lifestyle.

== See also ==
- Osusu, another term for the same thing, used in different regions
