= Sharmila Banerjee =

Bangladeshi dancer

Sharmila Banerjee is a classical, folk and creative dancer, and choreographer from Bangladesh.

== Education ==
Banerjee is a graduate from the University of Dhaka in Management Studies. She graduated from the Visva-Bharati University at Shantiniketan with a Bachelor of Music degree in Dance under ICCR Scholarship. In Shantiniketan, she received training in the Kathakali and Manipuri dance styles.

== Career ==
Banerji teaches as the head of the dance department at Chhayanaut, and runs her own private institution of dance named Nritya Nandan.

She has performed and choreographed in Bangladesh Television Dance Programs. She composed and directed Tagore's dance drama “Chitrangada”, “Chandalika”, “Shyama”, “Mayar Khela” “Kalmrigaya”, and other productions based on various Bengali literature of Rabindranath Tagore and Kazi Nazrul Islam. She has also worked as a choreographer at Theatre Performances.

== Recognitions ==
- “Visva Yuva Barsha Padak 1984”
- '“Nartan Visharad” by Manipuri Nartanalaya, Kolkata in 1996.
- “Shadhinata Padak (Chittagong) 1999.
- “Gauhar Jamil Shammanana Padak 2002” from the Bangladesh Dancer's Association.
- “Gunijan Shammanana” from the Manipuri Samskritik Parishad, Moulavibazar on the occasion of the Rash Utsav 2005.
- Meril Prothom Alo Award 2009, for the best dancer and choreographer for the year.
- Recognized as the “World Master of Bangladesh” by World Master's Association in Korea, 2009
- Awarded the “Shilpakala Padak 2018” for her contribution in dance in Bangladesh

== Personal life ==
Banerji is married to Bhaswar Banerjee, an elocutionist and theatre personality. She is the mother of dancer Sudeshna Swayamprabha.
