= Abdur Razzaq Malihabadi =

Abdur Razzaq Malihabadi (1895–1959) was the autobiographer of Maulana Abul Kalam Azad and a journalist.

== Life ==
He was born in Malihabad, a suburb of Lucknow district, capital of Uttar Pradesh. He died in Mumbai due to cancer survived by two sons (elder son is currently Rajya Sabha MP & Journalist) and a daughter (home maker). His early schooling happened in Lucknow (Nadwatul ulama) but later went on to Egypt to obtain his doctorate and he was the student Rashid Rida and he spent many years of his life there. He was fluent in languages like Urdu, Persian, Arabic, and Pashto. He worked for few years in All India Radio heading Arabic Department in New Delhi. He was close to the Saudi monarchy, Mahatma Gandhi and the Pandit Nehru family during the freedom struggle. Giving due recognition of his role in India's freedom struggle, he was offered a cabinet rank post-independence in the Nehru government which he declined. He was a journalist by soul and with his pen he wrote against British Raj and took their atrocities to common Indian man. Josh Malihabadi, another freedom struggle veteran and poet (fondly called "Shayar-e-Inquilab") was his cousin. He was of Pathan descent.

He wrote the books Zikar-e-Azad and Azad Ki Kahani Khud Azad Ki Zubani which was posthumously published by Daftar Azad Hind publications. He participated in the Khilafat Movement where he was a staff member of Jihan-i-Islam, a journal in Arabic and Urdu published from Istanbul. He was the founder editor of the Urdu daily Azad Hin' published from Kolkata and was very close to Azad during his stay in 19-A, Ballygaunge Circular Road, Kolkata where he stayed during his youth and the period of the freedom movement of India. He is the father of current Rajya Sabha (Independent Candidate) MP Saeed Malihabadi who was the editor of Urdu daily Azad Hind after his death. At present the newspaper is owned by Saradha Group.
