= Chit fund =

Savings and credit system in India

A chit fund is a type of rotating savings and credit association system practiced in India, Bangladesh, Sri Lanka, Pakistan and other Asian countries. Chit fund schemes may be organized by financial institutions, or informally among friends, relatives, or neighbours. In some variations of chit funds, the savings are for a specific purpose. Chit funds are often microfinance organizations.

However, massive scams such as Saradha Group financial scandal, Rose Valley financial scandal, and others have taken place by exploiting the potential of scamming in chit fund.

== History ==
The chit fund is said to be an institution that has been handed down since ancient times. In 1887, William Logan, erstwhile Collector of the Malabar district of the Madras Presidency, described the custom of chit funds among friend groups in that region. In 1894, economic historian Edith Simcox mentioned that chit fund lotteries were used to raise money for special events like weddings in South India. Various reports in the 1930s point to the popularity of chit funds in current-day Kerala. In the 1930s and 1940s, between 1,000 and 10,000 formal funds functioned in the state every year.

Chit funds went through several stages of overlapping formalization in the 20th century. The organizer became more active in soliciting funds for the fund and merchants and salaried workers, not just farmers, had also begun to participate. Institutional organizers including partnerships, limited liability firms, co-operatives and joint-stock banks entered the business. During the 1930s, 166 banks were conducting chit funds in Kerala. The first state-run chit fund, Kerala State Financial Enterprises, was established in 1969 by the Kerala government. Its explicit purpose was to provide an alternative to unscrupulous private-sector chit fund organizers. In 2000, it had 77% of the capital volume of the chit fund business in Kerala, though just 37.5% of the number of chit funds. By 2012, it has grown to serve 2.5 million customers with Rs 14,646 crore in annual business.

Due to the rigid provisions of the 1975 Kerala Chitties Act, many fund organizers moved to other states and started operating there. Private chit funds declined significantly in Kerala as a result. In the 1990s, several chit-fund-like investment options were developed that technically fall outside of the chit fund regulations.

Large chit funds for corporate needs have also been developed in the 1990s. The Model Chit Corporation in Hyderabad introduced a Rs 1 crore chit fund for the first time in August 1995.

== Geographic distribution ==
In urban areas of Tamil Nadu, Karnataka, Andhra Pradesh, Kerala, 5 to 10% of households participate in registered chit funds. As of 2002, they were less popular in North India, except in Delhi, Gujarat, Maharastra and Haryana.

According to All Kerala Kuri Foremen's Association, Kerala has around 5,000 chit companies, with Thrissur district accounting for the maximum of 3,000. These chit companies provide employment to about 35,000 persons directly and an equal number indirectly.

In Pakistan seventy percent of rural population is involved in this kind of funds. This funding is most famous in Pakistan's lower and middle class and sole business community.

In Malaysia, chit fund was known as the kootu fund and it was banned under the Kootu Funds (Prohibition) Act, 1971.

== Methodology ==
A chit fund comprises a group of members, called subscribers. An organizer, a company or a trusted relative or neighbor, brings the group together and administers the activities of the group. For their efforts, the organizer is either compensated each month or at withdrawal time. (The fee may be omitted in informal situations.)

The fund starts at an announced date and continues for the number of months equal to the number of subscribers. Each month, the subscribers put in their monthly installments into the pot. Then, an open auction is conducted to determine the lowest sum a subscriber is willing to take that month. For example, if the monthly installment is ₹1000 and there are 50 members, the pot in the first month will contain ₹50,000. If the auction determines a winner who is willing to accept ₹45,000 for that month, the surplus ₹5,000 is distributed to the other 49 members, after subtracting fees paid to the organizer. The subscriber who won the auction was able to access ₹45,000 in the first month and the others benefited in their share of the ₹5,000 surplus. The process repeats, distributing the auction amount to one member each month. All of the other subscribers, including the ones who took their share in a previous month, continue paying the monthly installments.

The system acts as a borrowing scheme, because subscribers are able to access large sums of money before they've paid the full amount. It also acts as a savings system, because each subscriber contributes every month and may retrieve a large sum in the future while receiving their share of the surpluses.

Variations of the system omit the auction part, instead drawing a winner by picking a chit out of a box. (The term chit fund comes from such an arrangement.)

== Risk ==
Both organizers and subscribers in chit funds are exposed to credit risk because subscribers might default on their periodic payments. One analysis of data from two chit fund companies found that 35% of subscribers have defaulted at least once during their tenure at one of the companies and 24% of them have defaulted after winning an auction for the pot. Chit fund companies can sue defaulters in court but the procedure is time-consuming and is unlikely to produce a timely settlement. It's up to the chit fund organizers to vet the credit-worthiness of subscribers. To reduce the risk of default, some organizers also require subscribers who win auctions to submit sureties for their future liabilities.

Since chit fund payments are not insured by the government, the system is a riskier method of saving than using a bank savings account.

== Legal framework ==
Organised chit fund schemes are required to register with the Registrar of Firms, Societies and Chits. A chit fund company is a company that manages, conducts, or supervises such a chit fund, as defined in Section of the Chit Funds Act, 1982. According to Section 2(b) of the Chit Funds Act, 1982:

Chit means a transaction whether called chit, chit fund, chitty, kuree or by any other name by or under which a person enters into an agreement with a specified number of persons that every one of them shall subscribe a certain sum of money (or a certain quantity of grain instead) by way of periodical installments over a definite period and that each such subscriber shall, in his turn, as determined by lot or by auction or by tender or in such other manner as may be specified in the chit agreement, be entitled to the prize amount.

Though they are not required to be registered under the RBI Act, chit funds are regulated as Miscellaneous Non-Banking Companies (MNBCs). Their activities relating to soliciting deposits are governed by the Non-Banking Financial Companies and Miscellaneous Non-Banking Companies (Advertisement) Rules (1977) framed by the Government of India under Section 58A of the Companies Act 1956.

The following laws govern chit funds:

- Union Government - Chit Fund Act, 1982 (except the State of Jammu and Kashmir)
- Kerala: Kerala Chit Fund Rules 2012 & Amendment 2016
- Tamil Nadu: Tamil Nadu Chit Funds Act, 1961
- Karnataka: The Chit Funds (Karnataka) Rules, 1983
- Andhra Pradesh: The Andhra Pradesh Chit Funds Act, 1971
- New Delhi: The Chit Funds Act, 1982 and Delhi Chit Funds Rules, 2007
- Maharashtra: Maharashtra Chit Fund Act 1975
- Odisha: Odisha Protection of Interests of Depositors (in Financial Establishments) Act, 2011 and Rules

== Special purpose funds ==
Some chit funds are conducted as a savings scheme for a specific purpose. An example is the Deepavali sweets fund, which has a specific end date about a week before Deepavali. Neighbourhood ladies pool their savings each week. They use this fund to buy and prepare sweets in bulk just before the Deepavali festival, and they distribute sweets to all members. Preparation of Deepavali sweets may be a time consuming and costly activity for individuals. Such a chit reduces costs, and relieves members from extra work in a busy festival season. Nowadays, such special purpose chits are conducted by jewellery shops, kitchenware shops, etc. to promote their products.

== See also ==
- Rotating savings and credit association
- Saradha Group financial scandal
- Peerless Group
- Kitty party
- Tontine
