= Community Bank (Oregon) =

Former American commercial bank

- Formerly: Bank of Wallowa County
- Company type: Private
- Industry: Banking
- Founded: May 1955; 71 years ago
- Defunct: May 9, 2025
- Fate: Acquired by STCU
- Headquarters: Joseph, Oregon
- Number of locations: 10
- Key people: Tom Moran, CEO; Jim Fortner, CFO; Kirk Amick, CCO; Bruce Morehead, COO
- Total assets: $570,000,000 (2022)
- Number of employees: 81 (2024)
- Website: communitybanknet.com

Community Bank was a commercial bank that served customers in Oregon and Washington. The bank was headquartered in Joseph, Oregon, and was the subsidy of Community Bancshares.

In 2025, Washington-based credit union Spokane Teachers Credit Union (STCU) acquired Community Bank and rebranded the branches as STCU.

== History ==
Community Bank was founded in May 1955 by Joseph, Oregon business leaders. At that time, the bank was named Bank of Wallowa County. The bank's name was changed to Community Bank in 1991, when the bank expanded out of Wallowa County into Pendleton, Oregon. The bank had operated 10 full-service branches, 7 in north-eastern Oregon and 3 in south-eastern Washington.

=== Acquisition by STCU ===
On August 13, 2024, Washington-based credit union Spokane Teachers Credit Union (STCU) announced plans to acquire all assets and liabilities of Community Bank.

On May 9, 2025, Community Bank shutdown their branches and redirected their website to STCU, the following week the branches were rebranded as STCU.

== Communities ==
Community Bank had branches in the cities of Baker City, Oregon, Clarkston, Washington, Elgin, Oregon, Enterprise, Oregon, Hermiston, Oregon, Joseph, Oregon, La Grande, Oregon, Pendleton, Oregon and Walla Walla, Washington.
