= Sudeshna Swayamprabha =

Sudeshna Swayamprabha is a Bangladeshi dancer. She dances and choreographs classical dances such as Manipuri, Bharatnatyam and Kathak. She learnt dance from Amala Shankar and her mother Sharmila Banerjee.

== Career ==
She participated in the 2003 Kalidas Festival in India, where she performed in “Chitrangada”. She has also won first place in a dance competition on BTV, titled “Tarana”. She has danced internationally in countries like Dubai, Norway and Sri Lanka.

== Teaching ==
She has formed her own dance academy called Nritya Nandan where she teaches dance.
