= Chama (investment) =

Savings co-operatives in East Africa

A chama is an informal cooperative society that is normally used to pool and invest savings by people in East Africa, and particularly Kenya. The chama phenomenon is also referred to as "micro-savings groups". "Chama" (also spelled kyama or Kiama in certain ethnic groups such as the Gikuyu) is the Kiswahili word for "group" or "body". The chama phenomenon arose out of the idea of harambee, which means "all together", in the late 1980s and 1990s. Originally, chamas tended to be exclusively women's groups, but as chamas started to grow in sophistication and success, men started participating in chamas as well. The chama structure is used throughout Africa, but is particularly popular in Kenya where the word originated. In Kenya there are estimated to be 300,000 chamas managing a total of KSH 300 billion (US$3.4 billion) in assets. Chamas are known for their exclusivity. In order to join, new members are typically subjected to extensive interviews and must have assurances or guarantees made for them by an existing member. Some sources have estimated that one in three Kenyans is a chama member.

== Chama structures ==
Chamas are found in many variations.

=== Merry-go-round ===
The original chamas were structured as rotating savings and credit associations (ROSCA), where the members agree to contribute a fixed amount at each meeting for a fixed period such as one year. At each meeting the funds are collected up and certain members are paid the entirety of the collected money on a rotating schedule. For example, a chama of twelve women might use this system on a monthly basis and contributing 1000 shillings by each member at each meeting. At each meeting 12,000 shillings would be collected and paid out to one of the members on the schedule. The risk of this arrangement is that members who are early in the payout rotation have an incentive to drop out of the chama after they have been paid. The participants at the end of the rotation have the highest risk of receiving reduced or no payment after paying faithfully themselves. ROSCA chamas minimize this risk by giving the most trusted members the early rotations and the least trusted members the latter rotations.

=== Pooled investment with shares ===
A longer-term form of chama in Kenya is organized on the basis of shares, which members buy to gain ownership of a percentage of the chamas investment or income. These organizations are classified as "accumulating savings and credit associations". This structure is very similar to a unit trust, however the chama leadership is not compensated for managing the fund, other than the profit on their own investment. Members must usually make a monthly commitment of a minimum investment, and bring their cash to the monthly or weekly meetings. The chama leadership invests the pooled funds in a pre-agreed-upon manner. Commonly, the chama will make loans to members at very high interest rates; 20% per month is typical. Chamas are also known to invest in transportation (taxis, matatus, buses), land, rental housing units, agricultural enterprises, as well as stocks, bonds and other financial products.

=== Agriculture cooperatives ===
Under British colonial rule, British settlers began forming agricultural cooperatives under the Cooperative Societies Act, particularly for the large scale production and export of coffee, tea, and locally dairy. After Kenyan independence in 1963, agricultural cooperatives continued to grow with Kenyan shareholders and leadership. Today Kenya's agricultural chamas continue large scale farm operations with economies of scale. Chamas that are incorporated as Limited Companies account for 42% of Kenya's GDP mainly through agricultural production.

=== Online Chamas ===
Technology has added changed how Chamas are accessed and organized, with 'electronic Chamas' being organized on websites and mobile apps such as Aturi Africa and OneKitty .

OneKitty is a digital platform designed to facilitate group savings and fundraising for a variety of shared goals, including charity, travel, education, weddings, investments, and funeral (burial) preparations. It allows users to create or join financial groups—often called "kitties"—and contribute funds toward a common goal in a secure and transparent manner.

OneKitty supports real-time WhatsApp and Telegram contributions by sending instant updates to messaging groups, helping members track progress and stay informed. This integration enhances collaboration, reduces delays, and eliminates confusion in managing group fundraisers and collective financial planning.

=== Peer-to-Peer Lending Chama Apps ===
Peer-to-peer (P2P) lending chama apps are digital platforms designed to facilitate borrowing and lending activities among members of traditional chamas (informal savings and investment groups) and other microfinance communities. These apps have become increasingly popular in Kenya and other parts of Africa, where informal savings groups play a significant role in financial inclusion.

Unlike traditional chamas, where members may need to wait until the end of the year to receive returns on their contributions or guarantees, P2P lending chama apps introduce a more dynamic system. Members who guarantee loans are paid interest immediately upon the repayment of those loans, providing faster returns and encouraging active participation.

Additionally, members are incentivized to take loans as a way to build their credit scores within the platform. This system rewards responsible borrowing and repayment behaviors, enabling members to access larger loans in the future while promoting a culture of financial responsibility. One notable example is Chamatek.

== Drawbacks ==
Chamas, particularly those that are informal and unregistered, have a reputation for problems with governance and mismanagement. Merry Go Round Chamas are subject to collapsing if one or more members collect early in the rotation, but drop out before the end of the rotation.

Share-based chamas have in many cases suffered from embezzlement by officers, mismanagement of funds, collusion with borrowers not to repay, high default rates on loans, as well as interpersonal conflicts and disagreements over how to invest the group's savings.

== Regulation ==
Chamas in Kenya are not regulated. Most of them are informal. Registered savings and credit cooperatives (SACCOs) are the ones regulated by Sacco Societies Regulatory Authority.

Chamas are regulated in Kenya and most other countries under the "Cooperative Societies Act" or similar legislation. In Kenya when a chama reaches a certain size, it can apply to become a savings and credit cooperative, which is similar to a credit union. Some chamas have grown to become SACCOs and a few of those have even continued to become banks.

Chamas that use a unit trust type organization can be incorporated as a limited company.

== Competition ==
Chamas have become such a successful phenomenon in Kenya that banks and brokerages have begun aggressively creating and marketing products to chama groups in order to bring some of the $4 billion chama savings into the formal financial system. Banks have also lobbied for new legislation to eliminate some of the competitive advantages of chamas.
