= Spokane Teachers Credit Union =

- Type: Credit union
- Industry: Financial services
- Founded: October 1934; 91 years ago
- Founder: Ernie McElvain
- Headquarters: Liberty Lake, Washington, United States,
- Products: Savings; checking; consumer loans; mortgages; credit cards; online banking; business services
- Members: 246,000
- Number of employees: Approximately 850
- Website: www.stcu.org

Spokane Teachers Credit Union (STCU), is a credit union chartered in the state of Washington, North Idaho, and Oregon. It is regulated under the authority of the National Credit Union Administration (NCUA) of the federal government. Membership is open to those "live, work, worship, or attend school" in Washington state, counties in Northern Idaho, or counties in Eastern Oregon.

The credit union was founded in October 1934. STCU has more than 304,000 members and over $6 billion in assets. Among the many Washington-based credit unions, it is third-largest, based on asset size.

STCU was voted Best Bank/Credit Union each year from 2006-2010 and Best Credit Union from 2011-2024 in the "Best of the Inland Northwest" reader surveys conducted by The Inlander, a free weekly newspaper.

== Services ==
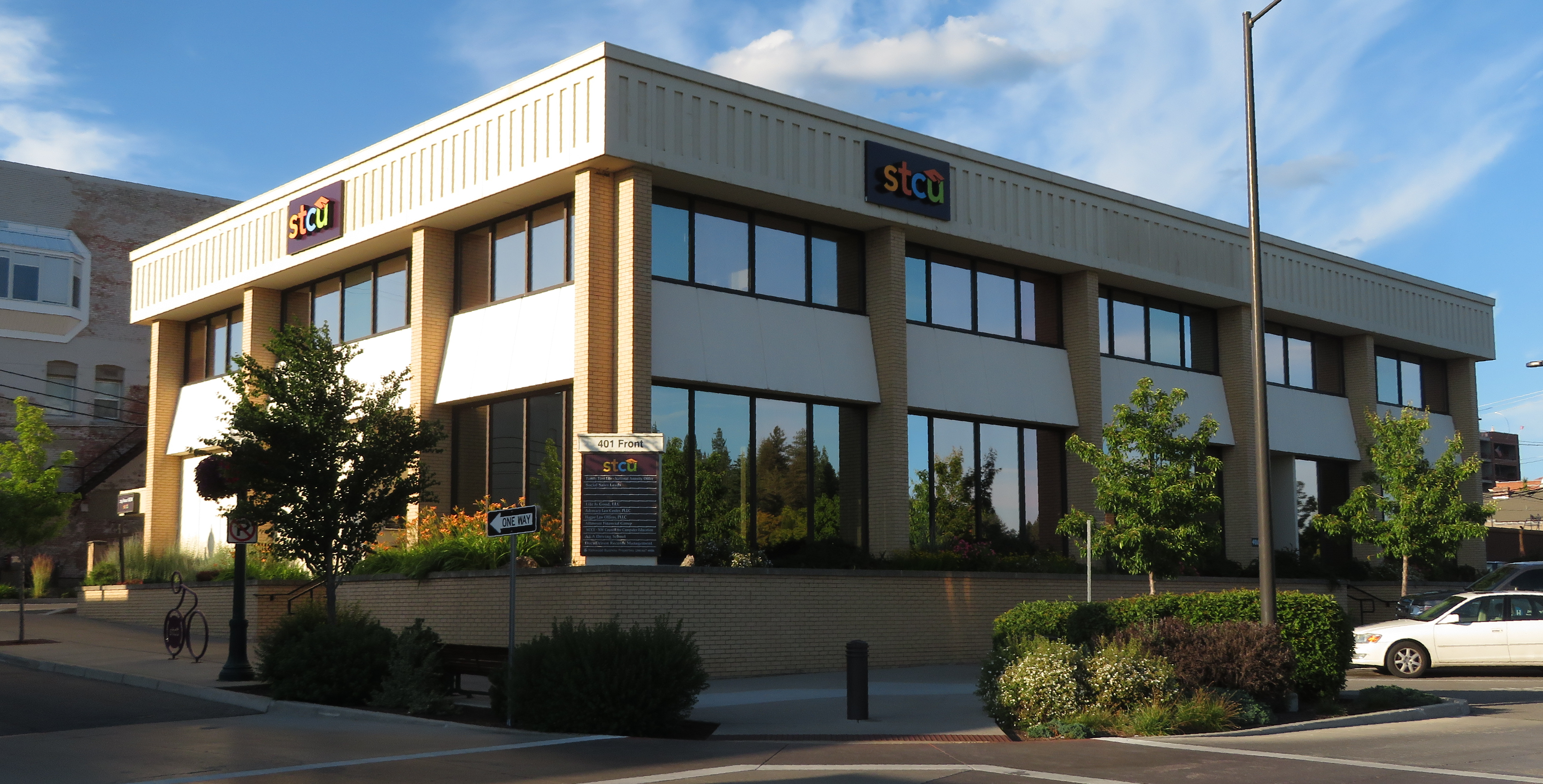
STCU branch in Coeur d'Alene, Idaho

STCU has 49 branch locations throughout Eastern and Central Washington and North Idaho. STCU reports that it began offering online banking in 1997, when many members were skeptical of the service. In 2010, the company updated its online banking system with features such as account alerts, secure messaging, and external transfers.

STCU is a member of the CO-OP Financial Services. Members pay no fees to use nearly 30,000 ATMs worldwide affiliated with the Co-Op Network of credit unions.

In 2015, STCU switched from Visa to Mastercard when the time came to implement EMV technology.

In 2024, STCU announced its integration with Community Bank to expand its reach across Eastern Washington, North Idaho, and Northeast Oregon.

== History ==
STCU was started in 1934 by Ernie McElvain, a teacher at Spokane's Lewis and Clark High School. The credit union operated out of a room on the school's second floor, with a shoebox for cash deposits and a bell with a rope that hung out the window, so that members could ring the bell when they needed to be let inside. The credit union ended the first year with 120 members and $4,000 in assets.

In 1964, STCU left the high school and opened its first office (now its Main Branch) at 106 W. Nora in Spokane. At the time, it had 2,078 members and $1.5 million in assets.

On August 13, 2024, STCU announced plans to acquire all the assets and liabilities of the Oregon-based Community Bank pending regulatory and shareholder approval. This acquisition expanded STCU into Oregon and South-eastern Washington.

== Leadership/Governance ==
On July 9, 2025, the STCU Board of Directors announced that it had named Lindsey Myhre the sixth CEO and President in STCU’s 91-year history. Myhre started her STCU career as an Accounting Assistant in 2000, and rose through the ranks to positions as manager, director, before joining senior leadership team in 2015, and was subsequently promoted to C-suite. She was CFO and EVP prior to May 2025, which the Board of Directors appointed her interim CEO and CFO.

Myhre was raised about 60 miles north of Spokane, in the rural town of Colville, Washington. She earned a bachelor’s degree in business administration – finance from Western Washington University and a Master of Business Administration (MBA) through Western Governors University. American Banker listed Myhre among The Most Powerful Women in Credit Unions 2023.

Since 2016, Myhre has served on the board for Partners INW, an organization that provides more millions in food and critical services to vulnerable households in Eastern Washington and North Idaho. In addition, Myhre is Past Chair and Past Treasurer of Spokane’s University District Development Association and continues to serve with the University District Public Development Authority. She is president and active volunteer for the Booster Club at East Valley School District.
