= Rose Valley financial scandal =

Financial and political scandal in India

Rose Valley Group
- Founded: 1997
- Founder: Kajal Kundu
- Years active: 1997–2015
- Territory: India (West Bengal, Odisha, Assam, Tripura, Jharkhand, and others)
- Ethnicity: Indian
- Leader: Gautam Kundu (Chairman)
- Criminal activities: Ponzi scheme, financial fraud, money laundering

The Rose Valley financial scandal, also called the Rose Valley chit fund scam, is a financial fraud case and political scandal in Northeastern India. The scam came to light in April 2013 after raids by the Enforcement Directorate (ED). It centres on the Tripura-based Rose Valley Group, a conglomerate accused of running unauthorised collective investment schemes and Ponzi schemes. It collected more than ₹15,000 crore from millions of depositors, mostly in eastern India.

== Origins and operations ==
The Rose Valley Group was founded in 1997 by Kajal Kundu, a former Life Insurance Corporation insurance salesman. He started Rose Resorts and Plantations in Tripura, offering collective investment schemes linked to rose plantations. Investors were told they would receive dividends from agricultural projects. In 1999, the company sought approval from the Securities and Exchange Board of India (SEBI) but was denied for non-compliance with regulations. Operations continued without authorisation. In 2003, Kajal Kundu died in a vehicle accident while travelling from Agartala to Guwahati. His brother, Gautam Kundu, then assumed control and expanded the company.

Under Gautam Kundu, the company launched the "Ashirvad" scheme, marketed as a real estate investment. Investors deposited money as booking amounts for land. At maturity, they could either take the land or get back their principal with interest rates of 11.96% to 17.65%, much higher than bank rates. The scheme attracted many low-income investors in eastern India. Kundu expanded from Tripura to West Bengal, Odisha, and Assam, setting up regional offices with agents who earned large commissions.

Between 2005 and 2011 the company grew rapidly. Collections rose from ₹3.75 crore in 2005-2006 to ₹1,271.98 crore in 2009-2010. The Economic Offences Investigation Cell of the Left Front government alerted SEBI on December 7, 2009, requesting an investigation. Collections kept rising, reaching ₹2,016.32 crore by March 31, 2011. In January 2011, SEBI prohibited Rose Valley Real Estate and Construction Limited from raising more funds. By then Kundu had already diversified into other sectors.

Gautam Kundu used depositor money to set up legitimate-looking businesses. He opened a large hotel at Mandarmani beach and acquired properties including the Chrome Hotel in Kolkata and hotels in Durgapur and Siliguri. In 2011 he launched a Holiday Membership Plan through Rose Valley Hotels and Entertainment Ltd. Investors paid monthly fees for vacation accommodation or were promised principal plus interest (up to 17.65%) at maturity. SEBI later identified about 21.9 lakh investors in this plan before it closed in 2013.

In 2009 Kundu started Rose Valley Media and Entertainment Limited, which ran television channels, radio, and cable networks. These included the entertainment channel Ruposhi Bangla and news channels News Time (Bengal) and Odisha Time. He became the main sponsor of the Kolkata Knight Riders in the Indian Premier League. Through Rose Valley Films and Brand Value Communications Ltd he invested nearly ₹10 crore annually in Bengali cinema. SEBI investigations later showed that these businesses were funded entirely by illegal deposit schemes. The regulator repeatedly said Rose Valley's operations were unregistered collective investment schemes that posed serious risks to investors. The company never obtained registration from the Reserve Bank of India for its financial activities. Despite prohibitory orders starting in 2011, the group continued operating by creating new companies and schemes until it collapsed in 2015.

=== Regulatory evasion and public panic ===
After the Saradha scandal in 2013, SEBI said Rose Valley was part of a larger pattern of financial fraud in eastern India. Rose Valley's estimated ₹4,000 crore deposits were larger than Saradha's ₹1,200 crore. After Saradha collapsed, panicked depositors lined up at Rose Valley branches to withdraw money. The company issued IOUs (coupons and token slips) instead of cash. Despite SEBI's 2011 restraining order, the group used legal delays to continue. Its real estate arm collected ₹1,270 crore and its hotels division collected ₹2,900 crore before being shut down in Jharkhand. In April 2013, SEBI imposed a ₹1 crore penalty and filed an FIR against company officials.

== Investigation ==
In 2015 the Enforcement Directorate (ED) detained Gautam Kundu under the Prevention of Money Laundering Act, alleging he had run one of India's largest Ponzi schemes. Investigators found the group had more than 3,000 bank accounts and assets spread across 12 Indian states. Estimates of the total fraud exceeded ₹15,400 crore. In 2024, the ED filed a supplementary charge sheet that named Subhra Kundu, wife of Gautam Kundu, among the accused.

=== Enforcement Directorate raids ===
In April 2013, the ED conducted surprise inspections at Rose Valley offices in Salt Lake, Baguiati, and Barasat, Kolkata, seizing financial records. Investigators alleged the group illegally collected public deposits in violation of SEBI rules and diverted funds into hotels, media, spices, and real estate. The raids happened at the same time as actions by the Odisha government, which had filed cases against Rose Valley and 42 other deposit-taking firms. Gautam Kundu said: "We operate within legal boundaries and aim to repay investors." Employees feared the company would shut down like the Saradha Group.

On 3 August 2021, the Economic Offences Wing (EOW) of Odisha arrested Vikramjit Bhowmik, the Odisha head of Rose Valley, from West Bengal's Medinipur. Bhowmik had been absconding since 2013 and was accused of cheating depositors of more than ₹6 crore by promising high returns. He was produced before the Balasore OPID court and remanded to 14 days of judicial custody. The allegations involved fraud through Rose Valley's branch offices in Balasore and Soro. Earlier arrests in the case included Gautam Kundu, managing director Shivamoy Dutta, and Soro branch manager Badal Chandra Kar. Authorities seized movable and immovable assets worth ₹83 crore and ₹11 crore in the Odisha case.

According to the Bengali edition of The Indian Express, the ED arrested a businessman named Sudipta Roy Chowdhury in connection with the Rose Valley investigation. ED officials said Roy Chowdhury had threatened officers at the time of his arrest. He is accused of facilitating large-scale benami transactions linked to Rose Valley funds. Authorities seized 13 of his bank accounts and recovered 25-26 credit and debit cards. The ED said it would seek custody for interrogation to trace the flow of funds and identify assets. Investigators alleged that Roy Chowdhury may have siphoned off up to around ₹100 crore before his arrest and used his connections to promote Rose Valley funds.

The ED produced Roy Chowdhury before a special ED court and asked for 18 days of custody, saying documents from his residence contained multiple names linked to Rose Valley. The court granted five days of custody. ED counsel Abhijit Bhadra told the court that the seized papers pointed to channels used to launder Rose Valley funds and that Roy Chowdhury had close contacts with a former ED investigator, Manoj Kumar, and a senior CBI officer in Kolkata. ED sources said they had found material suggesting that some earlier probes may have been influenced, and that they would examine whether financial transactions were used to affect inquiries. The CBI was reported to be likely to seek custody of Roy Chowdhury for parallel investigations.

The same report said that the CBI and ED had increased coordination before major festivals, holding meetings to speed up investigations into chit fund cases. Investigators said the intensified action aimed to identify suspects and recover diverted funds.

=== 2025 Calcutta High Court Ruling ===
On August 17, 2025, the Calcutta High Court dismissed a petition by Rose Valley Real Estate and Construction Company that had challenged SEBI's regulatory authority over deposit-mobilising firms. The company had contested Sections 11AA and 12 of the SEBI Act, which give the regulator power to require registration of collective investment schemes and take enforcement action. Justice Dipankar Dutta upheld the sections as "valid and in accordance with the law" and imposed ₹10 lakh costs on the petitioner, payable to the court registrar. The ruling followed a SEBI order in August 2025 that shut down Rose Valley's holiday membership plan and directed refunds to depositors. The company said it would appeal before a division bench.

== Asset Seizures and Restitution ==
In 2018 the ED seized assets worth more than ₹4,200 crore, including hotels, land, luxury vehicles, and other properties. After a special PMLA court approved, the ED facilitated restitution of ₹19.40 crore to defrauded investors in August 2024.

In September 2025, Union Minister of State for Finance Pankaj Chaudhary handed over a demand draft of ₹515.31 crore to the Assets Disposal Committee (ADC) chaired by retired Justice D.K. Seth. The funds came from ED attachments and were meant to compensate about 7.5 lakh claimants out of some 31 lakh registered claims. The ED had earlier traced proceeds across 2,987 bank accounts and attached assets during 2015-17, and later extended attachment of movable and immovable properties with a notional market value above ₹2,000 crore.

In October 2024, the Indian government started a large restitution program, distributing ₹515 crore to about 7.5 lakh victims of the scam. Further payments included ₹5 crore to 7,346 victims and ₹100.5 crore to another group of victims. By March 2025, the ED reported securing ₹450 crore for future restitution. The ED also began auctioning properties in Tripura to fund restitution.

The chit fund scams in Odisha, including those involving Rose Valley and Golden Land Developers, affected lakhs of small investors. Victims such as Balakrishna Pradhan of Ganjam district and Sadananda Dora were lured by high-return schemes and invested several lakh rupees, but never received payouts after the companies were sealed by the CBI.

The Odisha government set up the Justice R.K. Patra Commission in July 2013, later replaced by the Justice Madan Mohan Das Commission in February 2015. By February 2020, 8.86 lakh small depositors had filed affidavits. According to state government submissions in the Assembly, about three lakh depositors of Rose Valley filed claims, but refunds were sanctioned for only about 4,000 depositors, amounting to ₹4 crore.

In January 2021, the government launched the portal opid.odisha.gov.in for depositors to upload documents for refund claims. Limited progress was made. While ₹180 crore of Rose Valley's bank deposits were transferred to the state exchequer, opposition parties criticised the ruling Biju Janata Dal for the slow refund process. The Supreme Court later issued notice to the Odisha government, asking for clarity on measures to return money to depositors.

== Political involvement ==
The Rose Valley scam had political consequences, especially for the All India Trinamool Congress. Several party leaders faced questioning or arrest for alleged links to the group.

=== 2013 regulatory warnings ===
SEBI had warned the West Bengal government for more than a year about fraudulent chit funds through official letters and newspaper campaigns. Chief Minister Mamata Banerjee said she had received a SEBI letter about "a chit fund" two months earlier, but did not name Rose Valley. Her government set up a ₹500 crore relief fund for Saradha victims but took no similar action for Rose Valley depositors.

=== Sudip Bandyopadhyay ===
In January 2017, Trinamool Congress MP Sudip Bandyopadhyay was arrested by the Central Bureau of Investigation (CBI) for allegedly promoting Rose Valley schemes and receiving financial benefits.

=== Tapas Paul ===
Actor and Trinamool MP Tapas Paul was also implicated. He was a director in Rose Valley's media wing and was arrested.

=== Sadhan Pande and family ===
In 2016, the ED found transactions showing that Shrreya Pande, daughter of the late Trinamool MLA and Minister of State for Consumer Affairs Sadhan Pande, had received nearly ₹2 crore from Rose Valley Group for interior design work at properties in Kolkata and Mandarmani. Shrreya, a socialite with film and modelling experience, said these were legitimate professional fees, though she acknowledged that the company owed her ₹25 lakh. She said she was hired based on her work for clients like the Tata Group and the Reserve Bank of India. ED officials questioned the lack of formal interior design training and the selection process. She initially sent lawyers instead of appearing personally. Shrreya said she was being targeted because of her political family. Sadhan Pande did not comment at the time.

In 2024, the CBI named Shrreya as the prime accused in a fresh chargesheet, alleging that Rose Valley routed funds to her companies and financed her trip to China.

=== 2017 political fallout ===
The arrests of Bandyopadhyay and Paul in January 2017 caused political conflict in West Bengal. Former Chief Minister Mamata Banerjee called the arrests a "political vendetta" by the central government. She called for protests and asked why BJP leaders Narendra Modi and Amit Shah were not investigated similarly. She held an emergency meeting with TMC MPs, and party leaders demonstrated at the CBI office in support of Bandyopadhyay, including West Bengal minister Firhad Hakim.

BJP leaders such as Dilip Ghosh welcomed the arrests and said more would follow. Sidharth Nath Singh cited "ongoing violence in Bengal" as a concern. CPI(M) MP Md Salim noted Bandyopadhyay's "swift fall from prominence." The Indian National Congress supported the TMC; spokesperson Randeep Singh Surjewala accused Modi of "vendetta politics" and asked why central minister Babul Supriyo had not been arrested despite being named in the scam. Senior Congress leader Ahmed Patel called Banerjee to express support. Bandyopadhyay's wife, a TMC MLA, did not comment publicly, saying the party would handle the situation.

== Role of the Film Industry ==
Producer Shrikant Mohta, co-founder of SVF Entertainment, was arrested by the CBI in January 2019. He was accused of involvement in an alleged ₹24 crore fraud involving Rose Valley's Brand Value Communication through film distribution agreements. The case showed that about 30% of Tollywood's investments were controlled by chit fund companies through about 35 registered producers. The Rose Valley scandal, estimated at ₹17,520 crore, affected Bengal's film economy.

Mohta's arrest took place at his Kolkata office. The CBI found inconsistencies in his testimony about a 2010 agreement. Investigators seized 20 artworks allegedly bought with misappropriated funds.

From 2009 to 2014, Rose Valley invested more than ₹100 crore in Tollywood, financing over 40 films. But there were allegations of money laundering. For example, the film Hangover was recorded on paper as costing just ₹5 lakh. Cross-investment among 27 group companies made the finances harder to track. BJP leader Rahul Sinha said, "There is no better place than the film industry to invest black money... using stars to earn people's trust."

In July 2019, the ED summoned several industry figures. Actor Rituparna Sengupta was questioned for hours about payments made to her production house Bhavana Aaj O Kaal. Actor Prosenjit Chatterjee was summoned over ₹2.75 crore his company received during its affiliation with Rose Valley. The inquiries also covered actor-politician Tapas Paul and TMC MP Sudip Bandyopadhyay.

After SEBI ordered Rose Valley to repay investors in 2013 and Kundu's arrest in 2015, the industry changed. Monthly film releases fell from an average of 10 to just 3 by 2016. Brand Value Communications cancelled projects worth ₹500 crore. Average film budgets shrank from ₹4-5 crore to "₹1 crore or less," according to assistant director Bijoy Majhi. East India Motion Pictures Association vice-president Krishna Daga said the retreat of chit funds due to unpaid dues hurt filmmaking and created a livelihood crisis for over 10,000 technicians.

In restitution, the ED auctioned Rose Valley properties and returned ₹515 crore to 7.5 lakh victims by October 2024, and another ₹2.29 crore to 3,741 victims in February 2025. Rituparna Sengupta was summoned in 2024 in a ration distribution scam; she delayed appearing citing overseas commitments but later complied.

Local media also named actor-politician Dev in the Rose Valley investigation. According to a Bengali news report, the CBI's chargesheet filed in Bhubaneswar listed several individuals and mentioned Dev's presence at a Rose Valley event. Dev said he had attended and performed as an actor, that many other artists were present, and that he had not received a formal notice in the case.

== Related Companies ==
The Rose Valley Group operated through many subsidiaries and associated companies, several of which were later identified as shell companies. By 2013, the government was investigating more than 150 companies for financial irregularities, including many linked to Rose Valley.

== See also ==
- Saradha Group financial scandal
- Chit fund
- List of Ponzi schemes
