= Airplane game =

Style of pyramid scheme

The "Captain" (blue) is paid when 8 "passengers" have arrived at the bottom of the pyramid. (Below the Captain are two "Co-Pilots", below them four "Crew".)

The airplane game, also known as the plane game, is a style of pyramid scheme first recorded in the 1980s in North America and later Western Europe.

The common version of the system involved joining an "airplane" by paying a "pilot" to become one of eight "passengers". Already on the airplane were four "flight attendants" who were a step ahead, and two "co-pilots" next in line behind the pilot, thus the new passenger is fourth in the hierarchy. Once a pilot collected $12,000 from passengers to retire, the group split into two "airplanes", with each co-pilot becoming the pilot of the new airplane, taking half the participants and promoting everyone a level. Bringing in new passengers sped up everyone's progression towards retiring as a pilot. However, the structure of the scheme results in a participant losing the entire payment unless 14 new participants join.

The scheme had spread from New York to Texas to California to South Florida by early 1987, with police raiding meetings in all four states, and reports of more airplane schemes operating in Dallas. In Miami-Dade County, Florida, at least one recruiting session was reported with 1,000 attendees. Though common versions at the time required passengers to pay $1,500 to receive $12,000 as a pilot, some airplanes were being run with $5,000 passengers and a $40,000 pilot payout.

== Other names ==
The scheme has also gone by the names Concorde and Golden Galaxy with similar names for the steps. Cash Club, Victoria operated in the same way but with different amounts and the steps were renamed to "club member", "committee member", "vice-president", and "president". "Krona Klub" was a similar scheme with more complex payout rules, as was a so-called game variously called "Cosmic Adventure", "Flying Saucer", or "Flying Starship".

The payout structure of the 2021 "Blessing Loom" program (left) is functionally identical to the 1980s airplane scheme.

The scheme resurfaced in 2020, conducted over Instagram and other social media platforms, going by a variety of names including Blessing Loom and Loom Game.

In 2022, after receiving several complaints from the public, South Africa's Financial Sector Conduct Authority released an official warning to the public regarding The Prosperity Grid, saying that although it resembled a traditional stokvel savings scheme, they considered its structure to be a pyramid scheme. Because pyramid schemes fall outside of the jurisdiction of the FSCA, the matter has been referred to other relevant regulators and authorities.
