= Duddu Shah =

Bengali mystic

Duddu Shah was a Bengali mystic, follower of Lalon and a baul.

== Biography ==
Shah was born with the name Dabiruddin Mandal in 1841 in Beltala, Harinakunda Upazila, Jhenaidah District, Bengal Presidency, British India. He changed his name to Daddu Shah after being inspired by Lalon. He sometimes referred to himself as Duddu Mallik Biswas. His father Jharu Mandal was a farmer. He studied at Srinath Pathshala (school) in Harishpur village. Shah knew Arabic, Bengali, Persian Language, and Sanskrit.

Shah became a mystic through interactions with mystics. He became a disciple of Lalon and became part of his entourage. He wrote secular humanism.

Shah returned to Beltala near the end of his life. He became more focused on writing and devoted himself to religion. He wrote lyrics for Baul songs. He also wrote secular songs. He wrote two books, Lalon Charita, about the life of lalon, and Nur-e-Mohammadi, (translation:Light of Muhammad). Shah died in 1911. He is buried in Beltala village in Jhenaidah District. His grave is in a decrepit state due to neglect and lack of maintenance. A book, Baul Gaan ebong Duddu Shah, containing a collection of his work was compiled and edited by Burhanuddin Khan Jahangir.
