= Cultural humility =

Self-humility, especially in healthcare

Cultural humility is the “ability to maintain an interpersonal stance that is other-oriented (or open to the other) in relation to aspects of cultural identity that are most important to the [person].” Cultural humility is different from other culturally-based training ideals because it focuses on self-humility rather than being an other-directed "they/them" way of achieving a state of knowledge or awareness. It is helpful to see as others see; what they themselves have determined is their personal expression of their heritage and their “personal culture”. Cultural humility was formed in the physical healthcare field and adapted for therapists, social workers, and medical librarians, to learn more about experiences and cultural identities of others and increase the quality of their interactions with clients and community members.

== Background ==
To understand cultural humility, it is important to think about how culture is central in these interactions. The authors of the Culturally and Linguistically Appropriate Services (CLAS) standards explain the importance of culture in that “culture defines how health care information is received, how rights and protections are exercised, what is considered to be a health problem, how symptoms and concerns about the problem are expressed, who should provide treatment for the problem, and what type of treatment should be given. In sum, because health care is a cultural construct, arising from beliefs about the nature of disease and the human body, cultural issues are actually central in the delivery of health services treatment and preventative interventions.” Thus discovering and incorporating these differences help foster an environment that allows cultural humility to grow and take shape.

== History ==
Cultural competence was an idea first promoted in the healthcare profession. Competence educational programs are aimed at preventing medical misdiagnoses and errors due to lack of cultural understanding. However, with the increasing diversity in the United States combined with an added cultural awareness, competence was not serving the needs of all medical professionals. Cultural humility is a term coined by Melanie Tervalon and Jann Murray-Garcia in 1998 to describe a way of incorporating multiculturalism into their work as healthcare professionals. Replacing the idea of cultural competency, cultural humility was based on the idea of focusing on self-reflection and lifelong learning. Tervalon and Murray-Garcia believed that health care professionals were not receiving appropriate education or training in terms of multiculturalism, and developed a new method of approaching the topic.

Researchers are now more inclined than ever to facilitate complex conversations regarding the necessity of cultural humility within the medical sphere. Recognizing the significance of this practice becomes well understood when acknowledging the injustices minority communities faced as a result of a time before this practice was implemented. In addition to deleterious health consequences, medical mistrust is commonly associated with a lower satisfaction of health services received. Most prominent with immigrant communities experiencing higher levels of discrimination and prejudice, researchers explain these harmful experiences as a connection between decreased trust in medical providers. It is necessary to contextualize these results in the current social and political biosphere of our current society. If individuals feel threatened to seek preventative services over fears of being deported and treated inhumanely, those individuals will be less likely to access health services and make safe, informed medical choices on their behalf. Research also shows that "competence" and "suspicion" are factors that attribute medical mistrust in historically harmed communities. Medical mistrust runs rampant in minority communities due to the quick transmission of misinformation, including research conducted on disease testing and various risk behaviors.

	Cultural competence	Cultural humility
Goals	To build an understanding of minority cultures to better and more appropriately provide services	To encourage personal reflection and growth around culture in order to increase service providers' awareness
Values	Knowledge; Training	Introspection; Co-learning
Shortcomings	Enforces the idea that there can be 'competence' in a culture other than one's own.; Supports the myth that cultures are monolithic.; Based upon academic knowledge rather than lived experience. Believes professionals can be "certified" in culture.	Challenging for professionals to grasp the idea of learning with and from clients.; No end result, which those in academia and medical fields can struggle with.
Strengths	Allows for people to strive to obtain a goal.; Promotes skill building.	Encourages lifelong learning with no end goal but rather an appreciation of the journey of growth and understanding.; Puts professionals and clients in a mutually beneficial relationship and attempts to diminish damaging power dynamics.

== Cultural humility in social work ==
Recently, the social work profession has begun adopting cultural humility into frameworks for service delivery and practice. Most cultural humility rhetoric focuses on interpersonal, individual micro practice social work in terms of worker/client relationships and culturally appropriate intervention procedures. However, social work posits cultural humility as a strong self-reflection tool for the worker. Most importantly, it encourages social workers to realize their own power, privilege and prejudices, and be willing to accept that acquired education and credentials alone are insufficient to address social inequality. As such, this reflective practice, enables social workers to understand that the client is an expert in their own lives and that it is not the role of the worker to lean on their own understanding. In short, clients are the authority, not their service providers when it comes to lived experiences. Those who practice cultural humility view their clients as capable and work to understand their worldview and any oppression or discrimination that they may have experienced as well

In terms of the workplace of a social worker, supervisors should try to help workers to:

- Normalize not knowing. Supervisors and managers should aim to instill in staff the understanding that it is not only okay to not know—it is a necessary condition for growth, central to the practice of cultural humility and good social work practice.
- Create a culture-based client self-assessment tool. Workers need to offer clients a mechanism by which they can be seen and heard—an instrument such as this affords that opportunity. While clients have the right to refuse to complete it, practitioners can nonetheless remain vigilant and true in the practice of cultural humility.
- In-service: A cultural self-identification workshop. Supervisors or program managers can lead an in-service style conversation where staff members self-report how they differ from the cultural stereotypes others may believe about them.

Cultural humility is a tool that can be utilized by both macro (community organizing, social policy, evaluation, management) and micro (therapy, interpersonal) to better connect with individuals and communities as well as to gain more insight into personal biases and identities. Cultural humility can lead to both personal and professional growth of a social worker.

The Code of Ethics from the National Association of Social Workers has no mention of cultural humility in its latest edition that was approved in 1996 and revised in 2008.

== Cultural humility in occupational therapy ==
Occupational therapy is a client-centered health profession concerned with promoting health and wellbeing through occupation as defined by the World Federation of Occupational Therapists. The primary goal of occupational therapy is to enable people to participate in the activities of everyday life. Occupational therapists achieve this outcome by working with people and communities to enhance their ability to engage in the occupations they want to, need to, or are expected to do, or by modifying the occupation or the environment to better support their occupational engagement.

Cultural humility is an approach that emphasizes humble and empathetic communication with clients, with reduced reliance on bias or implicit assumptions. Occupational therapy practitioners strive to treat all people impartially, reduce bias, create diverse communities in which members can flourish and function, address conditions that hinder or cause harm to others, and protect and defend the rights of individuals. In the United States, the profession of occupational therapy is grounded in seven Core Values that include Equality and Justice. The AOTA (2015) Code of Ethics states that practitioners should “advocate for changes to systems and policies that are discriminatory or unfairly limit or prevent access to occupational therapy services”. Occupational therapy’s client-centered approaches distinctly focus on facilitating participation in meaningful occupations, and this outcome would not be possible without a commitment to diversity, equity, and inclusion. The profession of occupational therapy is resolute in its commitment to diversity, equity, and inclusion for its student bodies, workforce, and client populations and to advocacy for policies that lead to stronger, healthier, and more engaged communities.

Occupational Therapy Practitioners promote Cultural Humility when working with clients by:

- Focusing on facilitating participation in meaningful occupations while providing collaborative help to their clients.
- Providing equitable care that maximizes the health potential and quality of life for their clients by increasing their own self-awareness and knowing their personal bias.
- Respecting the clients’ integrity beyond the practitioner's own prejudice.
- Enquiring about client’s lived experiences rather than practitioner's own assumptions when determining best practice methods.
- Building organizational support that demonstrates cultural humility as an important and ongoing aspect of the work itself

Although the concept of cultural competence provides a useful starting place; cultural competence optimized health care experiences of clients with various backgrounds while emphasizing the practice of awareness, knowledge, and skills, it is time to develop a more radical and nuanced position to working in a multicultural society. Both cultural competence and cultural humility are focused on increasing awareness of one’s skills and behaviors while working in multicultural situations. However, important differences exist. Cultural humility provides a more critical and effective approach to working with clients with diverse perspectives. This shift in practice has the potential to increase the effectiveness of health professionals, reduce health disparities that fall along cultural lines, and increase the relevance of occupational therapy as it develops globally.

== Cultural humility in medicine ==
Researchers regard a holistic approach to patient care delivery as a possible solution to bridging the gap of medical trust and establishing more cultural sensitivity in doctor-patient interactions. This method would consider treatment options that affect the patient's physical, mental, emotional, and spiritual well-being. Reiterating that a patient consists of more than their physically presented symptoms can introduce more empathy and togetherness in medical interactions.

Establishing and continuing a relationship grounded on trust is another solution physicians can implement to combat medical mistrust in historically harmed communities. Many individuals in underserved communities have negative experiences with medical professionals, which evolves into a continuous cycle of feeling unwelcomed. Further, many individuals do not share their personal information with healthcare professionals, information that could possibly lead to a more efficient and accurate diagnosis of one's medical problems, due to feelings of shame and inferiority within their medical interactions. One possible remedy is culturally sensitive information. Using language that a patient is more comfortable understanding and expressing can lead to shared goals, cultivating an environment filled with empathy and acceptance. Further, understanding one another in a simple and efficient manner can decrease the likelihood of misinterpretations and confusions confounding the true experience both individuals want to maintain. Specifically in the unhoused population, researchers found that individuals were more receptive to communication centered on "I-You" interpretations rather than "I-It." In essence, individuals felt more seen when their actions and beliefs were empowered, rather than feeling dehumanized or not listened to.

Application of culturally sensitive information is vital to the process of ongoing medical care. Physicians must be aware of the presence of stigmatizing language and its harmful consequences on patient interactions. Examples of this language include "drug seeking" and "frequent flyers," but can include common terminology such as "mental health disorders" and the "homeless." It is necessary to recognize one's own implicit biases and internal prejudices, and further, actions must be taken to eliminate any harmful language. In addition to written medical language, spoken medical language contributes to patients' interactions with health providers and their long-term health outcomes. Research has shown that medical providers articulating complex medical information in a culturally sensitive manner improves patient outcomes and their understanding of the ongoing medical treatments, including their success in sticking to their medical schedules.

== See also ==
- Cross cultural sensitivity
- Social work
- Occupational Therapy
- Cultural competence in healthcare
