= Ahmed Hassan Imran =

Indian politician

Ahamed Hassan
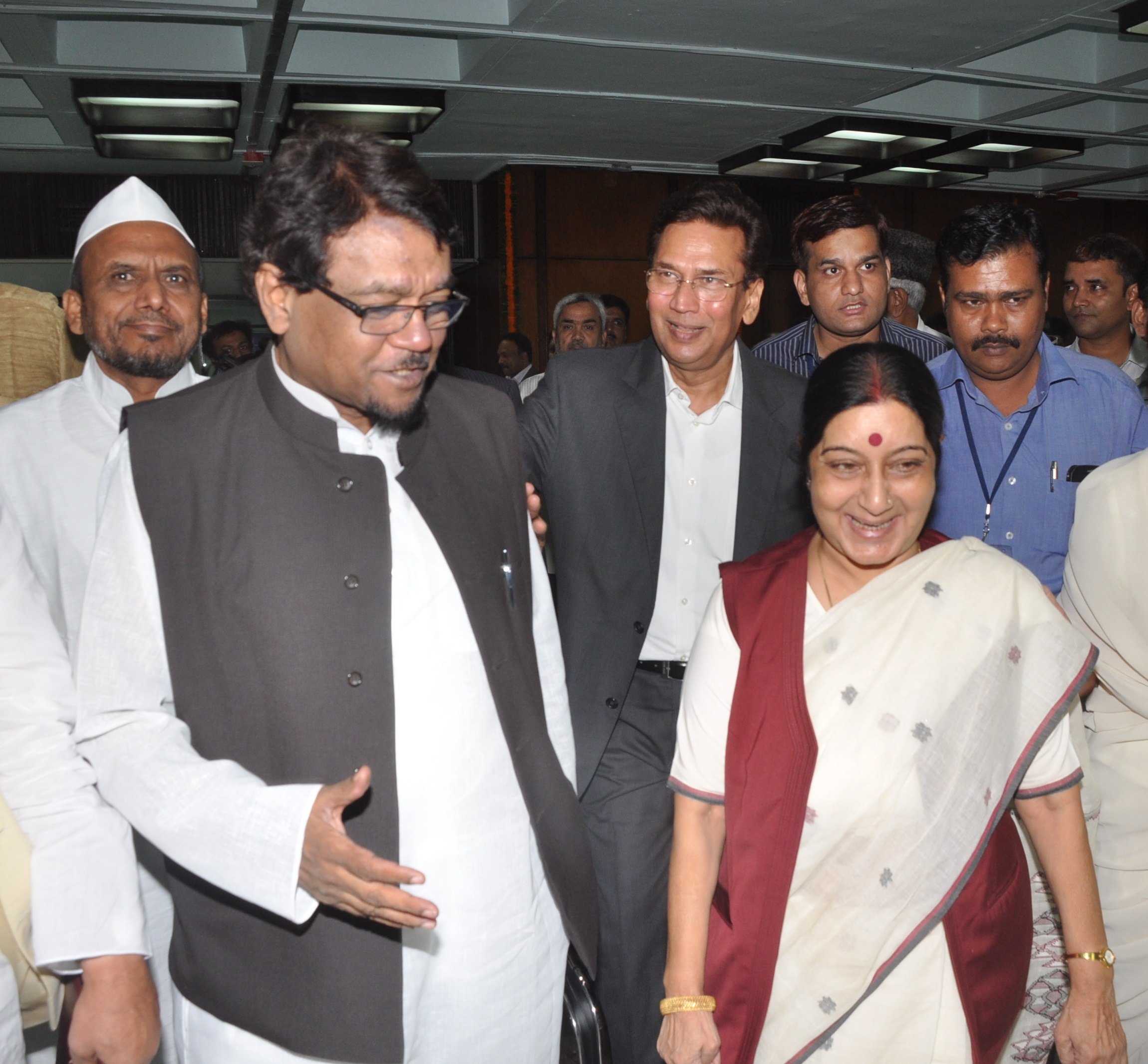
- Rajya Sabha MP Ahmed Hassan Imran (left) with the former Minister of External Affairs of India, Sushma Swaraj (right)

MP of Rajya Sabha for West Bengal
- In office 3 April 2014 – 2 April 2020
- Preceded by: Barun Mukherji
- Succeeded by: Dinesh Trivedi
- Constituency: West Bengal

Personal details
- Party: AITC

Ahmaed Hassan (Bengali: আহমেদ হাসান) alias Imran is a veteran journalist and was an MP of Rajya Sabha from West Bengal, India. He had sworn into the parliament on 9 June 2014. In April 2017, he was selected as the Chairman for the Telephone Advisory Committees by the Govt. of India. He became the Chairman of West Bengal Minorities Commission on 22 June 2023.

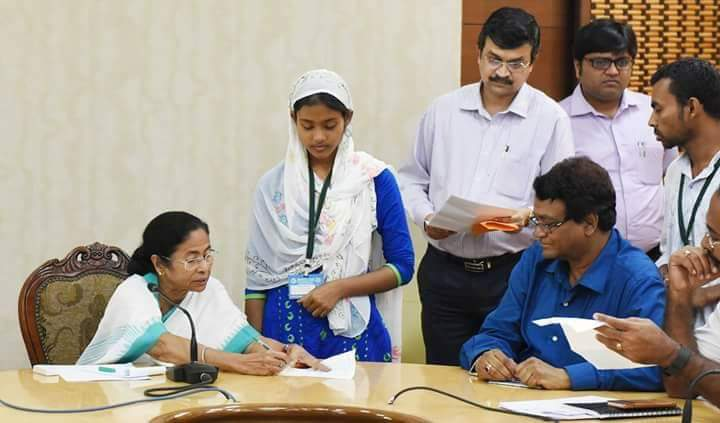
West Bengal Chief Minister Mamata Banerjee (left) with Rajya Sabha MP Ahmed Hassan Imran (right)

== Early life ==
Imran was born in the Mal of Jalpaiguri district in West Bengal.

Ahmed Hassan Imran is a well known Bengali Journalist. Like the popular Malayalam daily Madhyamam from Muslim community in Kerala, the Bangla daily Qalam has too consolidated its foothold under his stewardship in West Bengal. Started 30 years ago as a monthly, turned into a weekly after some years, Qalam has emerged as the best and the most popular daily since 2012 with a large circulation in the Bengali community. Due to his popularity and successful venture of the Bangla daily, he was nominated a Member of Rajya Sabha by All India Trinamool Congress in 2014.
