= Rotating savings and credit association =

Form of peer-to-peer banking

A rotating savings and credit association (ROSCA) is a group of individuals who agree to meet for a defined period in order to save and borrow together, a form of combined peer-to-peer banking and peer-to-peer lending. Members all chip in regularly and take turns withdrawing accumulated sums.

Economist F. J. A. Bouman described ROSCAs as "the poor man's bank, where money is not idle for long but changes hands rapidly, satisfying both consumption and production needs."

== Terminology ==
ROSCAs are known by various names around the world, and some of those names become loanwords between languages, including various ones that have made their way into English, especially in regional usage. For example, ROSCAs are also known as tandas (or by other names) in Latin America (including cundina, susu, junta, sand, cuchubale, and polla, syndicate, as well as Pasar, Quiniela and Sociedad (click "other names" more info)., chamas in Swahili-speaking East Africa, kameti (کمیٹی) in Pakistan, visi (વિસિ) among Gujaratis in India, equb (ekub) (እቁብ) in Ethiopia, partnerhands, pardna or pardner in the West Indies, cundinas in Mexico, hagbad in Somalia, stokvels in South Africa, susus or osusus in West Africa and the Caribbean, hui (會) in Chinese communities in East and Southeast Asia, hội/hụi (會) in Vietnam, paluwagan in the Philippines, gam'eya (جمعية) in Egypt, dart دارت in Morocco, gye (계/契) in South Korea, tanomoshiko (頼母子講) in Japan (or mujin in pre-1945 eras), wichin gye in Korea, lamka, committees or chit funds in India, pandeiros and consórcios in Brazil, cuchubál in Guatemala, juntas, quiniela or panderos in Peru, C.A.R. Țigănesc/Roata in Romania, arisan in Indonesia, chae (แชร์) in Thailand, dhukuti or dhikuti (धुकुटी/ढिकुटी) in Nepal, gün or evim sistemi in Turkey, ménage or menodge in Scotland, seettuva in Sri Lanka, likelembas in the Democratic Republic of the Congo, xitique in Mozambique, djanggis or njangi in Cameroon and صندوق Sanduq in Sudan, Lawm Sum in Zomi regions in Zogam, Chin State in Myanmar, Manipur, Mizoram in India and Chittagong Hill Tracts in Bangladesh Kootu fund in Malaysia.

== Structure ==
Meetings can be regular or tied to seasonal cash flow cycles in rural communities. These usually coincide with the crop harvest for farmers and pay dates for the employed members where people have sure funds on hand. A slot is equivalent to one periodic money withdrawal. To determine the order of money distribution among members, a drawing of slots is done and agreed upon before the start of periodic fund accumulation. A member can swap his slot with another through mutual agreement depending on the intended purpose. Such slot switching is allowed before the fund accumulation or periodic money withdrawal. A member who availed more than one slot may have the reserved right to choose the other slot pay date. Nevertheless, to avoid confusion, the organizer should be informed of the changes before the payment process. Each member contributes the same amount at each meeting, and one member takes the whole sum once. As a result, each member can access a larger sum of money during the life of the ROSCA and use it for whatever purpose she or he wishes. This method of saving is a popular alternative to the risks of saving at home, where family and relatives may demand access to savings.

Every member sees every transaction during the meetings. Since no money has to be retained inside the group, no records must be kept. However, some maintain a crude list of slots. These characteristics make the system a model of transparency and simplicity well adapted to communities with low literacy levels and weak systems for protecting collective property rights.

The system further reduces the risk to members because it is time limited—typically lasting no more than six months. Each member receives at least once the amount collected. This reduces the size of the loss should someone take funds early and not pay back.

In addition to their simplicity of structure, ROSCAs compensate when two key conditions exist, which make them competitive alternative financial products, even in relatively sophisticated economies:

1. Erosion of buying power of accumulated savings over long savings horizons in inflationary conditions
2. Failure of the normal financing market to provide credit to credit worthy borrowers, often due to opportunity cost, regulation, or operational expense

== Diversity and distribution ==
ROSCAs are informal or 'pre-co-operative' microfinance groups that have been documented around the developing world. A famous early study by anthropologist Clifford Geertz documented the arisans of Modjokuto in Eastern Java. He described them as "an 'intermediate' institution growing up within peasant social structure, to harmonize agrarian economic patterns with commercial ones, to act as a bridge between peasant and trader attitudes toward money and its uses."

The individuals in the ROSCA select each other, which ensures that participation is based on trust and social forces (social capital), and a genuine commitment to participate. In Brazilian consórcios, groups of strangers are assembled into a ROSCA unit by an agent or intermediary, whose role in facilitating the group formation and on-going administration is remunerated. As at 2015, over five million active ROSCA users were reported in Brazil.

== Types ==
ROSCAs can be compared and contrasted with accumulating savings and credit associations (ASCAs). Documented extensively in South Asia by Rutherford, ASCAs are also time-limited, informal microfinance groups. Unlike ROSCAs however, they appoint one of their members to manage an internal fund. Records are kept and surplus lent out. After a pre-agreed period (often 6–12 months) all the loans are called back and the fund, plus accumulated profit, is distributed to the members.

International development practitioners have been intrigued for years by the potential benefits of attempting to link ROSCAs and ASCAs to formal financial systems. But such linkages tend to defeat the voluntary purpose of these groups and distort member incentives towards securing access to external funds. CARE, an American NGO, has spread standardized ASCAs to reach 2 million people in Africa. These standardized ASCAs are called village savings and loan associations (VSLAs), and they usually comprise 10 to 20 participants who conduct saving and loan activities for a fixed period, usually 12 months. Unlike informal ASCAs, these use a triple-locked box to secure the funds, have standardized election procedures and maintain a careful separation of various duties, such as record-keeping, money-counting, meeting facilitation etc. Interest rates on loans typically vary from 5–10% a month, while cycle-end pay-outs in most groups is 30–60% of invested capital.

As of the end of June 2012 development agencies (including CARE, Oxfam, CRS and PLAN) were carrying out projects reaching 1.8 million members in 23 countries, mostly in Africa. The Savings Group Information Exchange, a project of the Bill and Melinda Gates Foundation, provides researchers with an on-line database where indicators like savings and loans per member, country, return on assets and percentage of female members can be compared.

Another interesting variant on this theme are the terminating deposits that formed part of product line of building societies in the last half of the nineteenth century. These provided many workers with the funds required to finance their own homes.

== Online ROSCAs ==
Carlos Veléz-Ibáñez, an anthropology professor at Arizona State University, stated that "technology has added a new twist to the savings pools, with 'electronic cundinas[ROSCAs]' being organized on Web sites that can bring together people from across the United States". A few of the existing products include eMoneyPool, created by two brothers living in Phoenix, Arizona; Monk, founded by ex-Google and ex-Intel employees in Silicon Valley; Puddle, a Google-venture backed startup, Moneyfellows UK & African based online mobile and web platform digitizing the ROSCA model; ROSCA Finance, a patent pending startup creating a global, autonomous money sharing platform founded by former Santander bankers; Esusu, founded by ex-Goldman Sachs, PwC and LinkedIn employees in New York and Partnerhand, a patent pending UK based organisation facilitating online 'Pardner's' between verified individuals, founded in 2010.

== History ==
Informal agreements of this type have arisen all over the world for centuries. The first academic description of them was by Shirley Ardener in 1964. In 1983, F. J. A. Bouman described ROSCAs as "the poor man's bank, where money is not idle for long but changes hands rapidly, satisfying both consumption and production needs." In a 1995 article on the origins and development of the concept, Bouman explained that "It represents a contract. Members of the association — the parties to the contract — agree to pool certain resources that are then given, in whole or in part, to each in turn. Resources in the pool can be labor, goods or money." Related to that point, Bouman also explained that "The ROSCA has several functions: insurance, socializing [ mutual assistance ], and economic. The former has been the basis of the ROSCA. Since the sixties, increased commercialization and monetization have put the emphasis on the economic function." Bouman also explained that because (1) breach of contract is an inherent risk of ROSCAs and (2) in many countries' legal systems, recourse to law courts for remedy is not available for ROSCA contract breaches, ROSCAs have been criticized and discouraged in some times and places.

== See also ==
- Bond of association
- Chit fund
- Collaborative finance
- Community banking models
- Friendly society
- Microcredit
- Solidarity lending
- Tontine

== Bibliography ==
- Ardener, Shirley and Sandra Burman. "Money-Go-Rounds: The Importance of Rotating Savings and Credit Associations for Women". Oxford: Berg, 1995.
- Arnaldo, Mauri, "Economia sommersa, finanza informale e microcredito nei paesi emergenti", A: Mauri & C. Conti (eds.), Finanza informale, finanza etica e finanza internazionale nelle piccole e medie imprese, Milano 2000.
- Besley, Timothy, Stephen Coate, and Glenn Loury. "The economics of rotating savings and credit associations." The American Economic Review (1993): 792–810.
- Geertz, Clifford. The Rotating Credit Association: a middle rung in development. Cambridge, Massachusetts, United States: Massachusetts Institute of Technology, Center for International Studies, 1956.
- Grant, William J. & Hugh Allen. CARE's Mata Matsu Dubara (Women on the Move) Program in Niger. Journal of Microfinance, Brigham Young School of Business, Provo, Utah, Fall, 2002.
- Remilien, E., Vivar, R.., Servín, R., Valtierra, E., & Pérez, L. M. (2024). Topic modeling analysis of Community Savings Groups: evidence from the combined literature. Agro Productividad 17 (1), 35-41. https://www.researchgate.net/publication/378337711_Topic_modeling_analysis_of_Community_Savings_Groups_evidence_from_the_combined_literature.
- Rutherford, Stuart, The Poor and Their Money Oxford University Press, 2000.
- van den Brink, Rogier and Jean-Paul Chavas, "The Microeconomics of an Indigenous African Institution: The Rotating Savings and Credit Association." Economic Development and Cultural Change, Volume 45, No. 4, July 1997.
- Von Pischke, J. D., Dale W. Adams & Gordon Donald. Rural Financial Markets in Developing Countries. EDI Series in Economic Development, World Bank, Washington, 1983.
- De Swaan, Abram and Van der Linden, Marcel. (eds.) "Mutualistic Microfinance, Informal Savings Funds from the Global Periphery to the Core?". Aksant, 2005.
