= Tanda (informal loan club) =

Informal savings club in Latin America

In Latin America, a tanda is the regional version of a rotating savings and credit association (ROSCA). It is a form of a short-term no-interest loan among a group of friends and family.

== Terminology ==
Such groups are operated globally, but have over 200 different names that vary from country to country. Some of those names become loanwords between languages. In the Romance languages of Latin America, other regional names for tandas include cundina (Mexico), susu (Caribbean islands), junta (Peru), sand (Venezuela), cuchubale (El Salvador and Guatemala), and polla (Chile), syndicate (Belize), as well as Pasar, Quiniela and Sociedad (various locales).

== Structure ==
The tanda is one of the most commonly followed informal associations in Mexico with 31% of the population actively participating in one. A tanda may be managed in different ways. The way it usually works is a group of people that know each other get together to collect money (either weekly, monthly, yearly) to help each other financially. Participants can come up with any rules as long as they benefit the group. Usually there is an amount of money and number of people in the group that they all agree to in order to have cash right away. When they come to an agreement of who will be in the tanda and how much it will be (either weekly, monthly, yearly), they have to come up with the order of who is going to receive the money. Participants can either raffle the numbers or make the decision in who needs the money most. It all depends on the group's decisions.

As an example, a tanda is formed between ten friends and family. Each member gives $100 USD every two weeks to the group's organizer. At the end of the month, one participant gets the "pot", $2000. Or, each member gives $100 weekly, and each week one of the ten participants get the pot ($1,000). This continues until each member has received the pot.

== Rationale ==
Tandas are formed for many reasons, but often because at least one member is in need of money to pay a debt right away, or an emergency arises. In the US, it can take many months or even years to get the Social Security Number needed to open traditional banking and credit card accounts. Tandas provide a way for immigrants and others to "borrow" and "save" when they don't have access to other means of banking. But they can also be formed with no pressing financial obligations.

Among Mexicans, these forms of informal savings associations play an important role sustaining the livelihood of many people living in both Mexico and the United States. Importantly, tandas are significant cultural practices among other Latino and Chicano populations in the U.S. According to cultural anthropologist Carlos Vélez-Ibáñez – the first scholar to critically examine this cultural practice among Mexicans – tandas are based on mutual trust. As Vélez-Ibáñez explains, trust "shapes the expectations for relationships within broad networks of interpersonal links, in which intimacies, favors, goods, services, emotion, power, or information are exchanged".

While tandas may play important economic roles among the Mexicans, they also serve important social and emotional functions in the everyday lives of people as they use it as a forum to improve their status among the fellow tanda members and their associates by religiously participating in the association. To state an example from Franziska Castillo's article Tandas: Informal loan clubs where trust meets need, she mentions her 22 year-old neighbor, Gerardo, who joined a tanda after his aunt vouched for him in the group. “If I have the money on my hands, I will spend it,” Gerardo reasoned for joining the tanda. He can not let his association down since his grandmother, a lifelong tanda member, would be disappointed by him. These social constructs create a platform that encourages saving among the members. While an average American saves only five percent of their income yearly, Mexican immigrants generally send an estimated 11.5 percent of their income back to their native countries. According to anthropologist Lourdes Gutierrez Najera, tandas are common among Oaxacan migrants.

For women, in particular, tandas facilitate social networks and makes them feel less isolated living in Los Angeles. As the women she quotes jokingly suggest, "the only reason women participate in tandas is for the gossip, otherwise it doesn't make sense." Consequently, participating in tanda gatherings make the separation from their hometown, Yalalag, more tolerable. Importantly, they also help migrants save money.

Younger generations have created companies that modernize tandas with online platforms. (Yahoo Finance, for instance, created the short-lived Tanda app which allowed friends and families to participate in the same group without being closely located geographically.) These platforms help solve the problems that are generated by the traditional tanda, like transparency, organization, localization, and money collection and distribution methods.

== Criticism ==
The CONDUSEF recommends to avoid participating in tandas, giving as reasons the inflation, lack of investment returns, the possibility of causing social distress, low liquidity and risk of scam, and other financial experts agree by the same reasons.

According to Milenio, there is the risk of being accused of tax evasion by organizing a tanda (unless extra precautions are taken to record the transactions clearly).

The SCJN stated that workers can be fired from their job if they participate in a tanda that causes social distress in the workplace.
