= List of banks in Africa =

This is a list of banks in Africa, arranged by country in alphabetical order. Since comprehensive lists are available on a country-by-country basis, only the most important domestic banks are indicated for each country.

== Algeria ==
- Bank of Algeria
- Banque Extérieure d'Algérie (BEA)
- Banque Nationale d'Algérie (BNA)
- Crédit Populaire d'Algérie (CPA)
- Banque de l'Agriculture et du Développement Rural (BADR)

== Angola ==
- Central Bank of Angola
- Banco Angolano de Investimentos S.A. (BAI)
- Banco do Comércio e Indústria
- Banco de Desenvolvimento de Angola
- Banco Económico
- Banco de Poupança e Crédito

== Benin ==
- Banque Internationale pour l'Industrie et le Commerce

== Botswana ==
- Bank of Botswana
- Bank Gaborone
- First Capital Bank Botswana Limited
- First National Bank of Botswana

== Burkina Faso ==
- Bank of Africa
- Banque Atlantique
- Ecobank
- United Bank for Africa

== Burundi ==
- Bank of the Republic of Burundi
- Banque Commerciale du Burundi (BANCOBU)
- Banque de Gestion et de Financement (BGF)
- Banque de Crédit de Bujumbura (BCB)
- Banque Nationale de Développement Économique (BNDE)

== Cameroon ==
- Afriland First Bank
- Commercial Bank of Cameroon
- National Financial Credit Bank
- Union Bank of Cameroon

== Cape Verde ==
- Bank of Cape Verde
- Banco Caboverdiano de Negócios
- Banco Comercial do Atlântico
- Banco Interatlântico
- Caixa Económica de Cabo Verde
- Ecobank Cabo Verde

== Central African Republic ==
- Banque Populaire Maroco-Centrafricaine

== Chad ==
- Commercial Bank Chad

== Comoros ==
- Central Bank of the Comoros
- Banque de Développement des Comores (BDC)
- Exim Bank Comoros
- Daixia Bank (www.daixiabank.com)

== Democratic Republic of the Congo ==
- Central Bank of the Congo
- Equity Banque Commerciale du Congo (heir to the Banque du Congo Belge)
- Rawbank
- Trust Merchant Bank (TMB)
- FINCA International

== Djibouti ==
- Central Bank of Djibouti
- Bank of Africa Mer Rouge (BOA)
- Banque pour le Commerce et l'Industrie – Mer Rouge (BCIMR)
- Banque de Dépôt et de Crédit Djibouti (BDCD)
- Exim Bank Djibouti (EXIM)

== Egypt ==
- Central Bank of Egypt
- Banque du Caire
- Banque Misr
- Commercial International Bank
- National Bank of Egypt
- Housing and Development Bank
- Suez Canal Bank
- Alexbank

== Equatorial Guinea ==
- Banco Nacional de Guinea Ecuatorial (BANGE)

== Eritrea ==
- Bank of Eritrea
- Commercial Bank of Eritrea
- Eritrean Investment and Development Bank
- Housing and Commerce Bank

== Eswatini ==
- Central Bank of Eswatini
- Eswatini Bank
- First National Bank (South Africa)
- Nedbank
- Standard Bank

== Ethiopia ==
- National Bank of Ethiopia
- Awash International Bank
- Bank of Abyssinia
- Commercial Bank of Ethiopia
- Cooperative Bank of Oromia
- Development Bank of Ethiopia
- Enat Bank
- Oromia International Bank
- Wegagen Bank
- Zemen Bank
- Dashen Bank

== Gabon ==
- Banque Gabonaise de Développement
- BGFIBank Group
- Banque Internationale pour le Commerce et l'Industrie du Gabon (BICIG)
- Union Gabonaise de Banque (UGB)

== Gambia ==
- Central Bank of The Gambia
- Trust Bank Limited (Gambia)

== Ghana ==
- Bank of Ghana
- Absa Bank Ghana (formerly Barclays Bank of Ghana Limited)
- Ecobank Ghana
- Ghana Commercial Bank

== Guinea ==
- Vista Bank Guinée, part of Vista Bank Group

== Guinea-Bissau ==
- Banco Da Africa Ocidental (BAO), part of Bank of Africa Group
- Banco Da União (BDU)
- Ecobank Guinée-Bissau, part of Ecobank Group

== Ivory Coast ==
- Banque Internationale pour le Commerce et l'Industrie de la Côte d'Ivoire (BICICI)
- NSIA Banque Côte d'Ivoire (formerly BIAO)
- Société Générale Côte d'Ivoire (SGCI)
- Société Ivoirienne de Banque (SIB)

== Kenya ==
- Central Bank of Kenya
- KCB Bank Kenya Limited
- Equity Bank Kenya Limited
- NCBA Bank Kenya
- Co-operative Bank of Kenya
- Absa Bank Kenya
- Stanbic Bank Kenya Ltd, part of Standard Bank Group

== Lesotho ==
- Central Bank of Lesotho
- First National Bank (South Africa)
- Nedbank
- Standard Bank

== Liberia ==
- Central Bank of Liberia
- Liberian Bank for Development and Investment
- First International Bank (Liberia)
- International Bank

== Libya ==
- Central Bank of Libya
- Agricultural Bank of Libya
- Gumhouria Bank
- Libyan Foreign Bank
- National Commercial Bank
- Sahara Bank
- Wahda Bank
- Banque Sahélo-Saharienne pour l'Investissement et le Commerce
- Andalus Bank

== Madagascar ==
- Central Bank of Madagascar
- Banque Malgache de l'Océan Indien (BMOI)
- BNI Madagascar
- Caisse d’Epargne de Madagascar
- Société Générale Madagasikara, undergoing purchase from Société Générale by BRED Banque populaire

== Malawi ==
- Reserve Bank of Malawi
- CDH Investment Bank
- FDH Bank
- National Bank of Malawi
- NBS Bank

== Mali ==
- Bank of Africa
- Banque du Développement du Mali
- Banque Malienne de Solidarité

== Mauritania ==
- Central Bank of Mauritania

== Mauritius ==
- Bank of Mauritius
- AfrAsia Bank
- Bank One Mauritius
- MauBank
- Mauritius Commercial Bank
- State Bank of Mauritius

== Morocco ==
- Bank Al-Maghrib
- Al Barid Bank
- Attijariwafa Bank
- Bank of Africa
- BCP Group

== Mozambique ==
- Bank of Mozambique
- Banco Nacional de Investimentos
- MCB Group

== Namibia ==
- Bank of Namibia
- Bank BIC
- Bank Windhoek

== Niger ==
- Bank of Africa - Niger (BOA-Niger)
- Banque Commerciale du Niger (BCN)
- Banque de l'Habitat du Niger (BHN)
- Banque Internationale pour l'Afrique au Niger (BIA-Niger)
- Société Nigérienne de Banque (Sonibank)

== Nigeria ==
- Central Bank of Nigeria
- Access Bank Group
- Bank of Agriculture
- Bank of Industry
- First Bank of Nigeria
- First City Monument Bank
- Keystone Bank Limited
- Sterling Bank (Nigeria)
- Union Bank of Nigeria
- United Bank for Africa
- Wayve Microfinance Bank

== Republic of the Congo ==
- Banque Commerciale Internationale (BCI)
- Crédit du Congo (CDC)
- La Congolaise de Banque (LCB)

== Rwanda ==
- National Bank of Rwanda
- Rwanda Development Bank
- Bank of Kigali
- Banque Populaire du Rwanda SA
- Commercial Bank of Rwanda
- Housing Bank of Rwanda

== São Tomé and Príncipe ==
- Central Bank of São Tomé and Príncipe
- Banco Internacional da Sao Tomé e Príncipe
- Energy Bank Sao Tome and Principe

== Senegal ==
- Banque Atlantique Senegal
- Banque Régionale de Marchés (BRM)
- CBAO Groupe Attijariwafa Bank
- Société Générale de Banques au Sénégal

== Seychelles ==
- Central Bank of Seychelles
- Seychelles International Mercantile Banking Corporation (SIMBC)
- Seychelles Commercial Bank

== Sierra Leone ==
- Bank of Sierra Leone
- First International Bank
- Rokel Commercial Bank
- Sierra Leone Commercial Bank
- Union Trust Bank

== Somalia ==
- Central Bank of Somalia
- International Bank of Somalia
- Premier Bank
- Salaam Somali Bank

== South Africa ==
- South African Reserve Bank
- Absa Group
- African Bank Limited
- Capitec Bank
- FirstRand Bank
- Investec
- Nedbank
- Standard Bank
- Development Bank of Southern Africa

== Sudan ==
- Central Bank of Sudan
- Bank of Khartoum
- National Bank of Sudan

== South Sudan ==
- Bank of South Sudan
- Buffalo Commercial Bank
- Equity Bank South Sudan
- International Commercial Bank
- Ivory Bank
- Nile Commercial Bank

== Tanzania ==
- Bank of Tanzania
- BancABC
- CRDB Bank
- Dar es Salaam Community Bank
- Exim Bank (Tanzania)
- FBME Bank
- Mkombozi Commercial Bank
- National Bank of Commerce (Tanzania)
- People's Bank of Zanzibar
- Zenith Bank

== Togo ==
- Banque Atlantique
- Banque Internationale pour l'Afrique au Togo
- Banque Sahélo-Saharienne pour l'Investissement et le Commerce
- Ecobank

== Tunisia ==
- Central Bank of Tunisia
- Amen Bank
- Attijari Bank
- Banque de Tunisie
- Banque Internationale Arabe de Tunisie
- Banque Zitouna
- Societe Tunisienne de Banque

== Uganda ==
- Bank of Uganda
- Centenary Bank
- East African Development Bank
- Housing Finance Bank
- Tropical Bank
- Uganda Development Bank
- Pebuu

== Zambia ==
- Bank of Zambia
- Access Bank Zambia
- Finance Bank Zambia Limited
- First Alliance Bank Zambia Limited
- Zambia Industrial Commercial Bank
- Zambia National Commercial Bank

== Zimbabwe ==
- Reserve Bank of Zimbabwe
- CBZ Bank Limited
- Peoples Own Savings Bank
- Zb Bank

== See also ==
- List of largest banks in Africa
