= Banking in Ethiopia =

The banking sector of Ethiopia composed of the central bank, the National Bank of Ethiopia (NBE) and the state owned Development Bank of Ethiopia (DBE), along with other thirty private banks. By 2020, the NBE planned to increase the minimum capital for banks to operate to 2 billion birr ($90 million) and instructed all commercial banks to increase their capital. Foreign banks did not allow to provide service in Ethiopia, instead use medium term as the government of Prime Minister Abiy Ahmed pursued wide economic reforms.

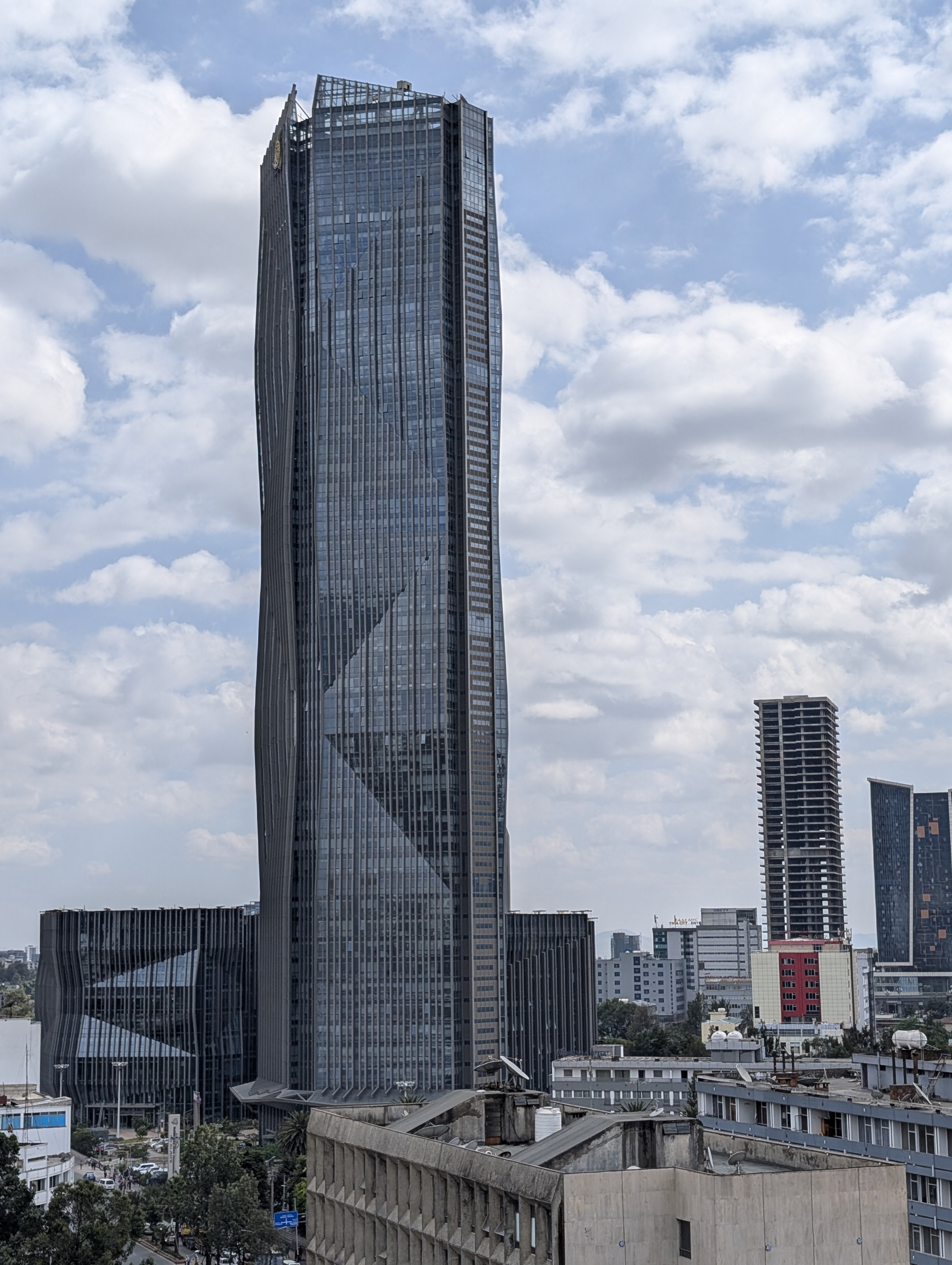
Headquarter of the Commercial Bank of Ethiopia in Addis Ababa

Currently, Ethiopia has allowed foreign banks to provide liaison service for their country of origins; Chinese, German, Kenyan, Turkish and South African banks opened their respective liaison banks in Addis Ababa.

== History ==
=== Ethiopian Empire ===
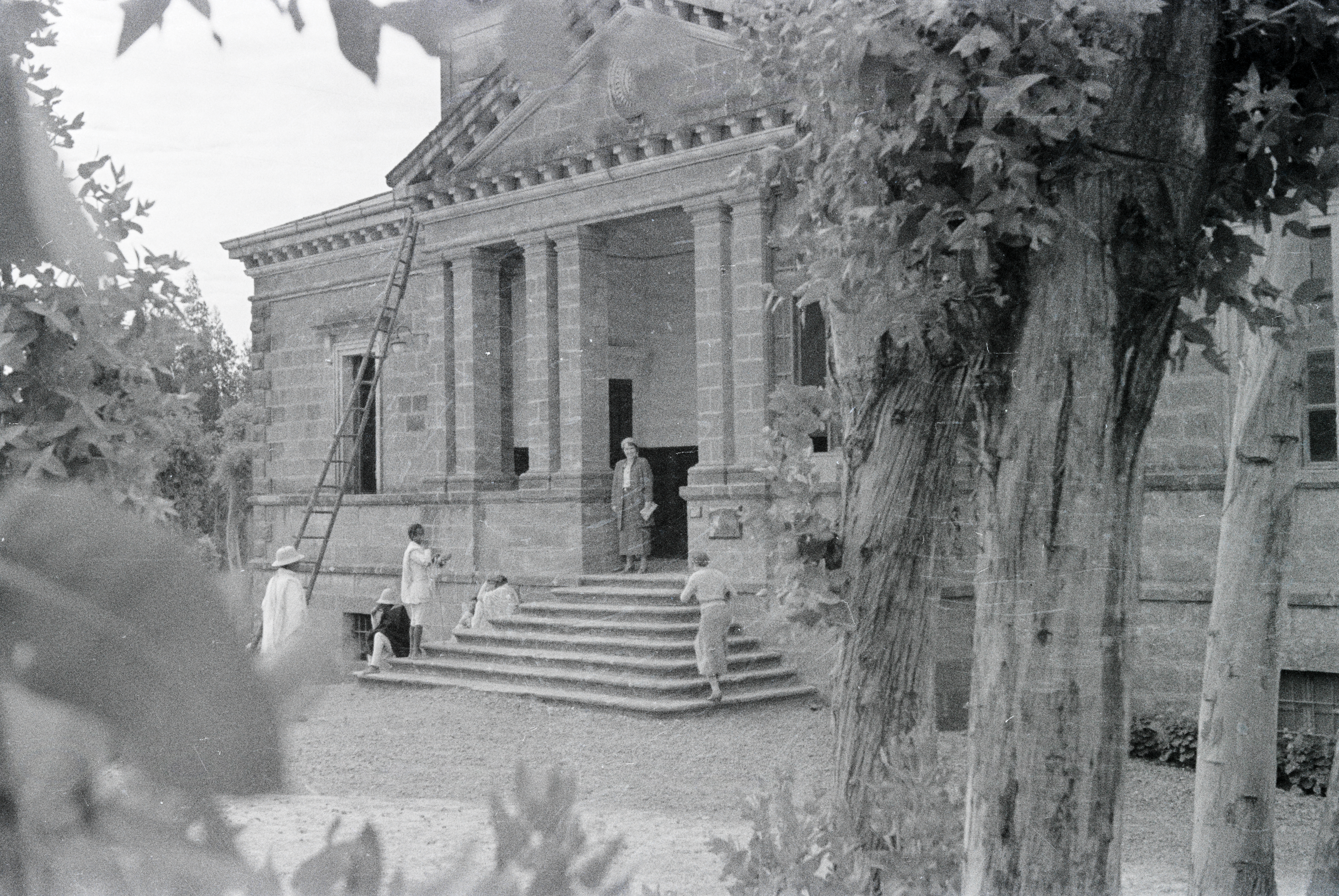
The first bank Bank of Abyssinia was opened in 1905 after concession with the National Bank of Egypt

Modern banking institution in Ethiopia was first introduced by the reign of Emperor Menelik II in 1905, where the Bank of Abyssinia was formed by concession between British representative of the National Bank of Egypt. Since its formal establishment on 16 February 1906, it was under the management of National Bank of Egypt in accordance of concession agreed upon. In 1963, a new banking law allows split into the National and Commercial Bank of Ethiopia. The law included other commercial banks to operate, including foreign banks operated 51% owned by Ethiopians. The biggest of these was the Addis Ababa Bank, owned by 40% owned by British owned Grindlays Bank, and had 26 branches by 1975. There were also two commercial banks: the Banco did Roma and the Banco did Napoli, which had eight branches and one branch respectively in 1975.

Besides commercial banks, the government established a developmental bank which was owned 100% by the government. The Agricultural and Industrial Development Bank (AIDB) was formed in 1970, taking over two earlier development banks: the Development Bank of Ethiopia and the Ethiopian Investment Corporation which was established in 1963 as the Investment Bank of Ethiopia. AADB was a government owned bank providing both medium- and long term loans to agricultural and industrial sectors. The Housing and Savings Bank was created in 1975 out of merger between two earlier housing finance institutions created in 1962 and 1965, one of them granted from the United States government.

=== Derg ===
Under the military junta Derg leadership, the entire economy falls into the government control, declaring a socialist policy towards the economy of Ethiopia. Private sector commercial banks were limited in existence; nationalized and concentrated into the Commercial Bank of Ethiopia (CBE).

Banks with large customers shifted into public enterprises, and forced to lend to the government for developmental plans. Meanwhile, money supply grew in real terms and as a proportion of GDP. Based on central bank planning policy, the CBE willingly obliged to lend to public enterprises according to the government instruction. During the Ethiopian Civil War, the profitable public enterprises reduced due to worsened foreign exchange shortages, and bankruptcy issues. They soon recovered as foreign exchange became more readily available. The lending to private sector, which was varying between 30% and 40% of loans and advance between 1981 and 1993, was equally straightforward, without foreign exchange; potential borrowers were not creditable and foreign exchange allocation is ideally profitable.

Commercial Bank of Ethiopia branches and offices in June 1994
Year	Branches	Year	Branches	Year	Branches
1975	2	1982	5	1989	3
1976	2	1983	4	1990	0
1977	5	1984	4	1991	0
1978	6	1985	3	1992	4
1979	6	1986	2	1993	1
1980	11	1987	6	1994	3
1981	3	1988	1	Total	71

=== FDRE ===
Following the defeat of the Derg in 1991, the ruling coalition Ethiopian People's Revolutionary Democratic Front (EPRDF) reversed the Derg regime, proposing more liberal policies. As such, the 1994 Monetary and Banking Proclamation established the National Bank of Ethiopia as the only judicial entity, independent from the government, under Proclamation No. 83/1994 and the Licensing and Supervision of Banking Business No. 84/1994 for investment in the banking sector.

Shortly after proclamation, Awash International Bank was established in 1994 by 486 shareholders and by 1998 its capital reached up to 50 million ETB. Dashen Bank was established on 20 September 1995 as a share company with capital 50 million ETB. Wegagen, Nib International Bank, and Cooperative Bank of Oromia Bank ensued.

== Traditional institutions ==
Well-known social institutions in Ethiopia include Eder and Equb. Eder is a long-term association of people that warrants supportive aid to a member community with insurance. Equb is temporary and permanent, rotating savings and credit association that helps for funeral insurance where community members elect their leaders, contribute resources either in kind or in cash and support the mourning member.

== List of insurance companies ==
=== Private ===
- Africa Insurance S.C.
- Abay Insurance S.C.
- Awash Insurance S.C.
- Berhan Insurance S.C.
- Bunna Insurance S.C.
- Global Insurance S.C.
- Lion Insurance S.C.
- Lucy Insurance S.C.
- NIB Insurance S.C.
- Nile Insurance S.C.
- Nyala Insurance S.C.
- Oromia Insurance S.C.
- Tsehay Insurance S.C.
- The United Insurance S.C.
- Zemen Insurance S.C.
- Ethio-Life & General Insurance S.C.
- NICE Insurance S.C.

=== State-owned ===
- Ethiopian Insurance Corporation
