= Berhan Bank =

Private commercial bank in Ethiopia

- Type: Private
- Industry: Financial services
- Founded: 27 June 2009; 17 years ago
- Headquarters: Addis Ababa, Ethiopia
- Area served: Ethiopia
- Key people: Ermias Tefera (President), Eligo Legesse (Chairperson), Ermias Girma (Vice Chairperson)
- Products: Banking services
- Operating income: 337.6 million (2021)
- Owner: Berhan Bank S.C
- Number of employees: 5,283 (2021)
- Website: berhanbanksc.com

Berhan Bank (Amharic: ብርሃን ባንክ) is an Ethiopian private commercial bank that was established in 2009. As of November 2024, it had expanded to 17 branches.

== History ==
Berhan Bank was established on 27 June 2009 by Article 304 of Ethiopian Commercial Code. Its initial capital was 300 million birr with registered capital of 154.7 million birr. On 3 October 2009, the bank began its operation and expanded its branches into 17 offices as of November 2024.

On 5 November 2021, Bethlehem Getachew was appointed as the new acting president of the bank after the resignation of Abraham Alaro, who had served from 2014. On 10 January 2024, Ermias Tefera was appointed as the new president.

Berhan Bank's employee's profit grew from 91,959 birr to 197,903 birr in November 2024.

== See also ==
- List of banks in Ethiopia
