= Tsehay Bank =

Private commercial bank in Ethiopia

- Native name: ፀሐይ ባንክ
- Company type: Private
- Industry: Financial
- Founded: 23 July 2022; 3 years ago
- Headquarters: Addis Ababa, Ethiopia
- Number of locations: 91 (2024)
- Area served: Ethiopia
- Key people: Yared Mesfin (CEO)
- Website: tsehaybank.com.et

Tsehay Bank (Amharic: ፀሐይ ባንክ) is a private commercial bank in Ethiopia launched in July 2022. The bank started with 30 branches in Addis Ababa, and as of 2023, the number of branches has increased to over 91 service centers throughout Ethiopia. The bank is known for its "Bank for All" motto. It is one of the privately owned banks licensed by the National Bank of Ethiopia (NBE) to operate in Ethiopia.

== History ==
Tsehay Bank was launched in July 2022 and had collected over half a billion capital (734 million Ethiopian birr ETB) before starting operation making it among the few banks which collected above the minimum capital requirements set by the NBE. Soon after its inauguration, the bank had raised its capital from 2.8 to 5 billion ETB.

Yared Mesfin Belayneh was Tsehay Bank's founding CEO.

== Operations ==
Tsehay Bank headquarter is located at Sierra Leone Av., Meaza Desalegn Tower, Beklo Bet, Kirkos Sub-city, Addis Ababa, Ethiopia. The bank's SWIFT Code is TSCPETAA.

== See also ==
- List of banks in Ethiopia
