= List of banks in Cameroon =

List of banks

This is a list of banks in Cameroon, as updated by the country's ministry of finance.

== List of banks ==
- Access Bank, part of Access Bank Group
- AFG Bank
- Africa Golden Bank (AGB)
- Afriland First Bank (AFB)
- BANGE Bank Cameroun, part of BANGE Group
- Banque Atlantique Cameroun (BACM), part of BCP Group
- Banque Camerounaise des Petites et Moyennes Entreprises (BC-PME), state-owned
- Banque Camerounaise pour le Financement International (BGFIBank), part of BGFIBank Group
- Banque Internationale du Cameroun pour l'Épargne et le Crédit (BICEC), part of BCP Group
- Citibank Cameroun, part of Citigroup
- Commercial Bank Cameroon (CBC)
- Crédit Communautaire d'Afrique – Bank (CCA-BANK)
- Ecobank Cameroun, part of Ecobank Group
- La Régionale Bank
- National Financial Credit Bank (NFC-B)
- Société Commerciale de Banque Cameroun (SCB-Cameroun), part of Attijariwafa Bank Group
- Société Générale Cameroun (SGC), part of Société Générale Group
- Standard Chartered Bank Cameroon (SCBC), part of Standard Chartered Group
- Union Bank of Cameroon (UBC), part of Oceanic Bank Group
- United Bank for Africa (UBA), part of UBA Group

== See also ==
- Central Bank of Central African States
- List of banks in Africa
