= Addis International Bank =

Private commercial bank in Ethiopia

- Native name: አዲስ ኢንተርናሽናል ባንክ
- Company type: Private
- Industry: Financial
- Founded: 31 January 2011; 15 years ago
- Headquarters: Jomo Kenyatta St, Addis Ababa, Ethiopia
- Number of locations: 146
- Area served: Ethiopia
- Key people: Hailu Alemu (President)
- Services: Mobile banking Retail
- Net income: 213.1 million birr (2020)
- Website: addisbankib.com.et

Addis International Bank (Amharic: አዲስ ኢንተርናሽናል ባንክ; ADiB) is a private commercial bank in Ethiopia established in 2011 by various groups of shareholders, microfinance, Eder institution and other business enterprises and investors.

== History ==
Addis International Bank (ADiB) was founded on 31 January 2011 after obtaining license from the National Bank of Ethiopia (NBE) by various groups of shareholders, microfinance, Eder institution and other business enterprises and investors. Started its operation on 30 May 2011, the bank was established by collected 109.4 million birr from 5,309 shareholders equity.

As of 30 June 2020, Addis International Bank net profit was increased to 213.1 million birr and earnings per share to 225.1 birr.

== See also ==
- List of banks in Ethiopia
