= Amhara Bank =

Private commercial bank in Ethiopia

- Native name: አማራ ባንክ
- Type: Private
- Industry: Financial
- Founded: 18 June 2022
- Headquarters: Ras Mekonnen Ave, Leghar, Addis Ababa, Ethiopia
- Number of locations: 321 (2026)
- Area served: Ethiopia
- Key people: Gashaw Debebe (Chairman) Yihnalem Aknaw (CEO)
- Net income: 655 million birr (2024/25)
- Total assets: 52.76 billion birr (2026)
- Owner: Amhara Bank S.C
- Number of employees: approx. 4,500 (2026)
- Website: www.amharabank.com.et www.amharabank.com

Amhara Bank is an Ethiopian private commercial bank based in Addis Ababa. It was founded in 2022. The bank was established with the largest initial shareholder base in Ethiopia's private banking history, comprising over 167,000 shareholders. The bank's paid-up capital has reached more than 7.4 billion Birr. As of 2026, its total capital reserves exceeded 10.285 billion Birr.

== Operations and services ==
Amhara Bank operates a network of over 320 branches across Ethiopia, serving a customer base of approximately 2.9 million individuals.

=== Digital banking ===
The bank provides digital financial services, primarily through a proprietary mobile banking application. The digital platform has registered over 1.2 million subscribers.

=== Interest-free banking ===
Amhara Bank operates a full-fledged interest-free banking (IFB) window under the brand name "Marhaba," which was launched on March 18, 2023. The service offers Sharia-compliant financial products tailored for customers seeking non-interest financial solutions.

== History ==
Amhara Bank was founded on 18 June 2022 in Addis Ababa. As of January 2023, Amhara Bank had over 165,000 shareholders and over 72 branches. Amhara Bank had over 6.516 billion birr in signed starting capital and 4.83 billion paid birr.

With over 6.5 billion birr in capital and 180,000 subscribers, Amhara Bank has the largest shareholder base in Ethiopia's banking industry. Melaku Fanta was a chairman of the Board of the Amhara Bank.

== See also ==
- List of banks in Ethiopia
