= CBCA =

CBCA may refer to:

- Canada Business Corporations Act, a Canadian law regulating Canadian business corporations
- Children's Book Council of Australia, a nonprofit organisation that aims to engage the community with literature for young Australians
- Commercial Bank Centrafrique, one of the largest banks in the Central African Republic
- Civilian Board of Contract Appeals, the U.S. Civilian Board of Contract Appeals
