= Ambesa Bank =

Private commercial bank in Ethiopia

Anbesa Bank
- Native name: አንበሳ ኢንተርናሽናል ባንክ
- Formerly: Lion International Bank
- Type: Private
- Industry: Financial services
- Founded: 2 October 2006; 20 years ago
- Headquarters: Addis Ababa, Ethiopia
- Area served: Ethiopia
- Key people: Daniel Tekeste (President)
- Products: Banking services
- Revenue: 747.1 million birr (2024)
- Total assets: 41.8 billion birr (2024)
- Owner: Lion International Bank S.C.
- Website: anbesabank.com

Anbesa Bank (Formerly Lion International Bank Amharic: አንበሳ ባንክ) is an Ethiopian commercial bank. It was established in 2006.

== History ==
Lion International Bank was established on 2 October 2006 by a group of 3,739 shareholders. On 6 January 2007, the bank began operations. The number of shareholders since increased to 12,855, with paid-up capital exceeding 3.05 billion birr and total assets of 41.8 billion birr as of October 2024. Daniel Tekeste has been the president of the bank since 2022.

The bank renamed itself as Anbesa Bank in 2026.

== See also ==
- List of banks in Ethiopia
