= Commercial Bank Group =

Financial services organization in Central Africa

- Company type: Private
- Industry: Banking and Finance
- Founded: 1997
- Headquarters: Douala, Cameroon
- Products: Loans, Mortgages Investments, Debit cards, Credit Cards
- Website: Homepage

Commercial Bank Group is a financial services organization in Central Africa. The Group's headquarters are located in Douala, Cameroon, with subsidiaries in Cameroon, Chad, Central African Republic, Equatorial Guinea and São Tomé and Príncipe.

== Overview ==
Commercial Bank Group is a large financial services conglomerate in Central Africa, with subsidiaries in five countries. The member institutions serve both individuals and businesses, with emphasis on small-to-medium enterprises (SMEs).

== Member companies ==
The companies that compose the Commercial Bank Group include, but are not limited to the following:

- Commercial Bank of Cameroon (CBC) - Cameroon
- Commercial Bank Chad (CBT) - Chad
- Commercial Bank Centrafrique (CBCA) - Central African Republic
- Commercial Bank Equatorial Guinea (CBGE) - Equatorial Guinea
- Commercial Bank São Tomé and Príncipe (CBSTP) - São Tomé and Príncipe
- SFA Financial Products - Cameroon - Commercial Bank Group has 51.4% shareholding.

== Ownership ==
The member companies of the group are all privately owned. In 2005, Commercial Bank Group created a bank holding company, named Capital Financial Holdings S.A. (CFH), which is the controlling entity in each of the subsidiary companies. CFH is headquartered in Luxembourg, but maintains a subsidiary in Yaoundé, Cameroon.

== See also ==
- Commercial Bank of Cameroon
- Commercial Bank Centrafrique
- Central Bank of Central African States
