= Tsedey Bank =

Private commercial bank in Ethiopia

- Native name: ፀደይ ባንክ
- Company type: Private
- Industry: Banking; financial services
- Predecessor: Amhara Credit & Savings Institution (ACSI)
- Incorporated: 28 January 2022; 4 years ago (as Tsedey Bank)
- Founded: 1 April 1997; 28 years ago (as ACSI)
- Headquarters: Addis Ababa, Ethiopia
- Number of locations: 627+ (2024)
- Area served: Ethiopia
- Products: Loans; savings; interest-free banking; trade finance
- Services: Retail banking; microfinance; international Banking
- Total assets: 62.2 billion birr (2024)
- Total equity: 13.5 billion birr (2024)
- Owner: National Bank of Ethiopia
- Number of employees: 13,400+ (2024)
- Website: tsedeybank-sc.com

Tsedey Bank (Amharic: ፀደይ ባንክ) is an Ethiopian private commercial bank that operates in Ethiopia. It was preceded by the Amhara Credit & Savings Institution (ACSI) that was established in 1995 as a microfinance company.

In January 2022, the bank acquired license from the National Bank of Ethiopia (NBE) on 28 January 2022 and officially inaugurated on 24 September 2022.

== History ==
Tseday Bank was incorporated as the Amhara Credit & Savings Institution (ACSI) in 1995, as a rural credit department by the Organization for Rehabilitation and Development Ethiopia (ORDA-Ethiopia). In 1997, the bank transformed into licensed microfinance company. As this time, its initial capital was 3 million birr with 40 employees.

On 3 April 2021, the first shareholder assembly took place and approved the bank as a fully-fledged bank. Tseday Bank acquired its license from the National Bank of Ethiopia (NBE) on 28 January 2022 and officially inaugurated on 24 September 2022. Its branches reached 148. As of 2025, Tseday Bank operated over 627 branches with over 13,400 staff.

== See also ==
- List of banks in Ethiopia
