= Abay Bank =

Private commercial bank in Ethiopia

- Native name: አባይ ባንክ
- Company type: Privately held company
- Industry: Financial services
- Founded: 14 July 2010; 15 years ago
- Headquarters: Jomo Kenyatta St, Addis Ababa, Ethiopia
- Number of locations: 528 (2024)
- Area served: Ethiopia
- Key people: Yehuala Gessesse (CEO)
- Services: Banking services
- Revenue: 8.4 billion birr (2024)
- Operating income: 6.13 billion birr (2022/23)
- Website: www.abaybanksc.com

Abay Bank (Amharic: አባይ ባንክ) is an Ethiopian commercial bank established in 2010. Named after the Blue Nile River, Abay Bank was established by 4,100 shareholders and by 2024 had more than 500 branches and 7 district offices.

In 2019, the bank build its new headquarter in Lideta district with 827 million birr investment.

== History ==
Abay Bank was established on 14 July 2010 and began full operation on 3 November 2010. It is named after Blue Nile River in western Ethiopia. With initial capital of 174.5 million birr and a paid-up capital of 125.8 million birr, it was invested by 4,100 shareholders. Abay Bank office is located in Jomo Kenyatta St, in Addis Ababa, expanding its offices with 500 branches and 7 district offices.

In May 2019, Abay Bank build its 1,600 square kilometers headquarter in Lideta district, with 827 million birr. In November 2022, the bank reported registered 1.3 billion birr profit, increased up to 13% growth.

== See also ==
- List of banks in Ethiopia
