= Bunna International Bank =

Private commercial bank in Ethiopia

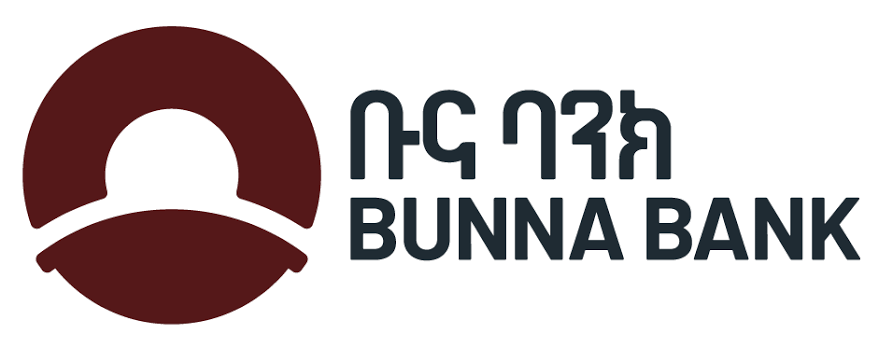
- Native name: ቡና ኢንተርናሽናል ባንክ
- Company type: Private
- Industry: Financial services
- Founded: 10 October 2009; 15 years ago
- Headquarters: Bole Rwanda, Bole Road, Addis Ababa, Ethiopia
- Area served: Ethiopia
- Key people: Mulugeta Alemayehu (CEO)
- Products: Banking services
- Revenue: 625 million birr (2019)
- Total assets: 54.53 billion birr (2025)
- Owner: Bunna International Bank S.C.
- Number of employees: 4,100 (2024)
- Website: bunnabanksc.com

Bunna International Bank (Amharic: ቡና ኢንተርናሽናል ባንክ) is an Ethiopian private commercial bank that was established in 2009. It was founded by over 10,000 shareholders and granted license from the National Bank of Ethiopia (NBE) on 25 June 2009.

== History ==
Bunna International Bank was established on 10 October 2009 by over 10,000 shareholders with subscribed and paid-up capital of 308 million and 156 million birr. On 25 June 2009, the bank obtained a license from the National Bank of Ethiopia (NBE).

As of June 2019, Buna International Bank revenue grew to 625 million birr, 46% increase from the previous fiscal year. In February 2025, the banks total assets reached to 54.53 billion birr and its deposits increased by 20% with 43.87 billion birr, which is praised by some analysis for market enlargement. Ato Mulugeta Alemayehu has been the CEO of Buna International Bank after since 12 September 2018, after serving as vice-president of the Commercial Bank of Ethiopia (CBE).

== See also ==
- List of banks in Ethiopia
