= Zemen Bank =

Private commercial bank in Ethiopia

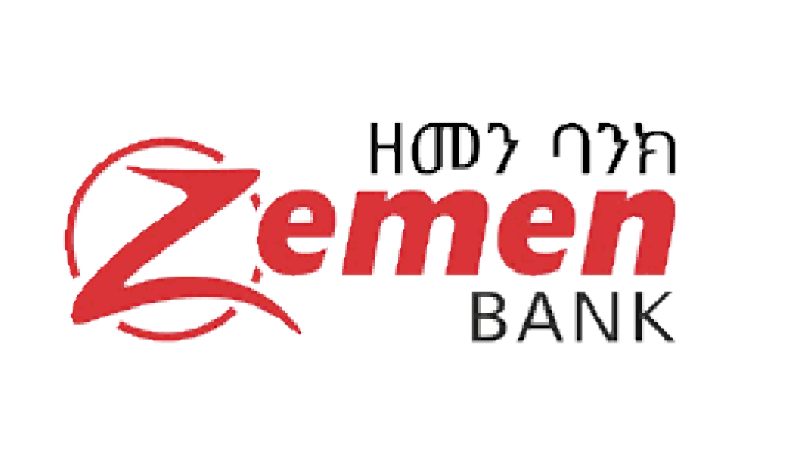
- Type: Private
- Industry: Financial services
- Founded: 2 October 2008; 18 years ago
- Headquarters: Addis Ababa, Ethiopia
- Area served: Ethiopia
- Key people: Dereje Zebene (CEO)
- Products: Banking services
- Revenue: 7.8 billion birr (2024)
- Operating income: 2.5 billion birr (2023)
- Number of employees: 438 (2023)
- Website: zemenbank.com

Zemen Bank is a private commercial bank that operates across Ethiopia. Established in 2008, the bank is one of banks to provide commercial activity in Ethiopia.

== History ==
Zemen Bank was established on 2 October 2008 "licensing and supervision of banking business proclamation No. 84/1994" of Ethiopia. It is private bank with commercial type. In 2023/2024 fiscal year, its total revenue has reached about 7.8 billion birr (101% of annual report).

On 12 February 2012, Zemen Bank made the first ever inaugural hot air balloon flight from Jan Meda field as part of advertising campaign. The advertising arrangement was made by Dutch-Ethiopian company Abyssinian Balloon PLC. In August 2024, Zemen Bank provided services to 75 Dutch companies operating in Ethiopia.

== See also ==
- List of banks in Ethiopia
