= Maria Theresa thaler =

Silver bullion coin

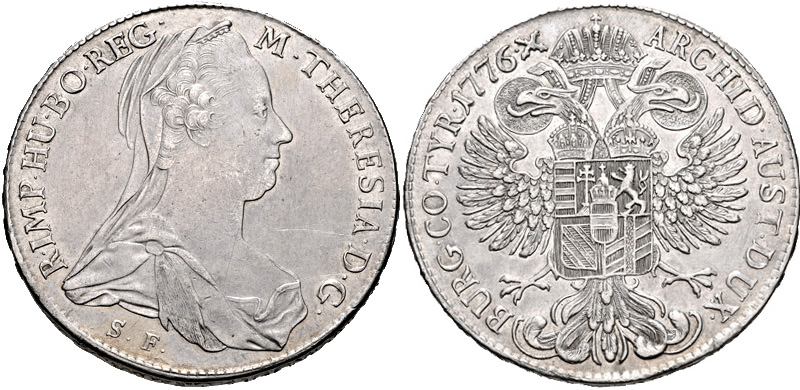
Silver coin: 1 Maria Theresa thaler

The Maria Theresa thaler (MTT) is a silver bullion coin and a type of Conventionsthaler that has been used in world trade continuously since it was first minted in 1741. It is named after Maria Theresa, who ruled Austria, Hungary, Croatia, and Bohemia from 1740 to 1780 and is depicted on the coin.

== History ==
In 1741, the first MTT was struck according to the Reichsthaler standard with 1/9 of a Cologne mark of fine silver, or 25.98 grams. In 1750 a new thaler was struck with a gross weight of 1/10 of 1 Vienna mark of silver, 5/6 fine (with a fine silver content of 23.39 grams, or 1/10 of a Cologne mark). In 1751 this new standard Conventionsthaler was effectively adopted across the German-speaking world when it was accepted formally in the Bavarian monetary convention. This new, post-1751 thaler has continued as a trade coin ever since.

Since the death of Maria Theresa in 1780, every newly minted MTT has been dated 1780. On 19 September 1857, Emperor Francis Joseph of Austria declared the Maria Theresa thaler to be an official trade coinage. A little over a year later, on 31 October 1858, it lost its status as a currency in Austria.

The MTT could also be found throughout the Arab world, especially in Saudi Arabia, Yemen, and Muscat and Oman, in Africa, especially in Ethiopia, and India. Being of similar size to the Spanish eight-real coin, and initially thought to be of French origin, the MTT acquired the Arab name al-riyal al-fransi (الريال الفرنسى, literally the 'French riyal'). This coin was therefore the predecessor to, among others, the Saudi riyal and the Ethiopian birr.

During the Japanese occupation of the Dutch East Indies in World War II, enough people preferred it to the money issued by the occupying forces that the American Office of Strategic Services created counterfeit MTTs for use by resistance forces.

In German-speaking countries, following a spelling reform dated 1901 that took effect two years later, Thaler is written Taler (the spelling of given names like Theresa was not affected). Hence 20th-century references to this coin in German and Austrian sources are found under Maria-Theresien-Taler. The spelling in English-speaking countries was not affected.

The Austrian Mint continues to produce the MTT and offers them in uncirculated condition.

A sculpture of the coin stands in Piazza del Ponterosso in Trieste. It is made of steel with a 3 meter diameter and recognizes the importance of the MTT.

== Details ==
The thaler is 39.5–41 mm (1.56–1.61 in) in diameter and 2.5 mm (0.098 in) thick, weighs 28.0668 grams (0.99003 oz) and contains 23.386 grams (0.752 troy ounces) of fine silver. It has a silver content of .833 and a copper content of .166 of its total millesimal fineness. The Rome mint struck MTTs that are marginally lighter being produced in finer 835-standard instead of 833-standard silver.

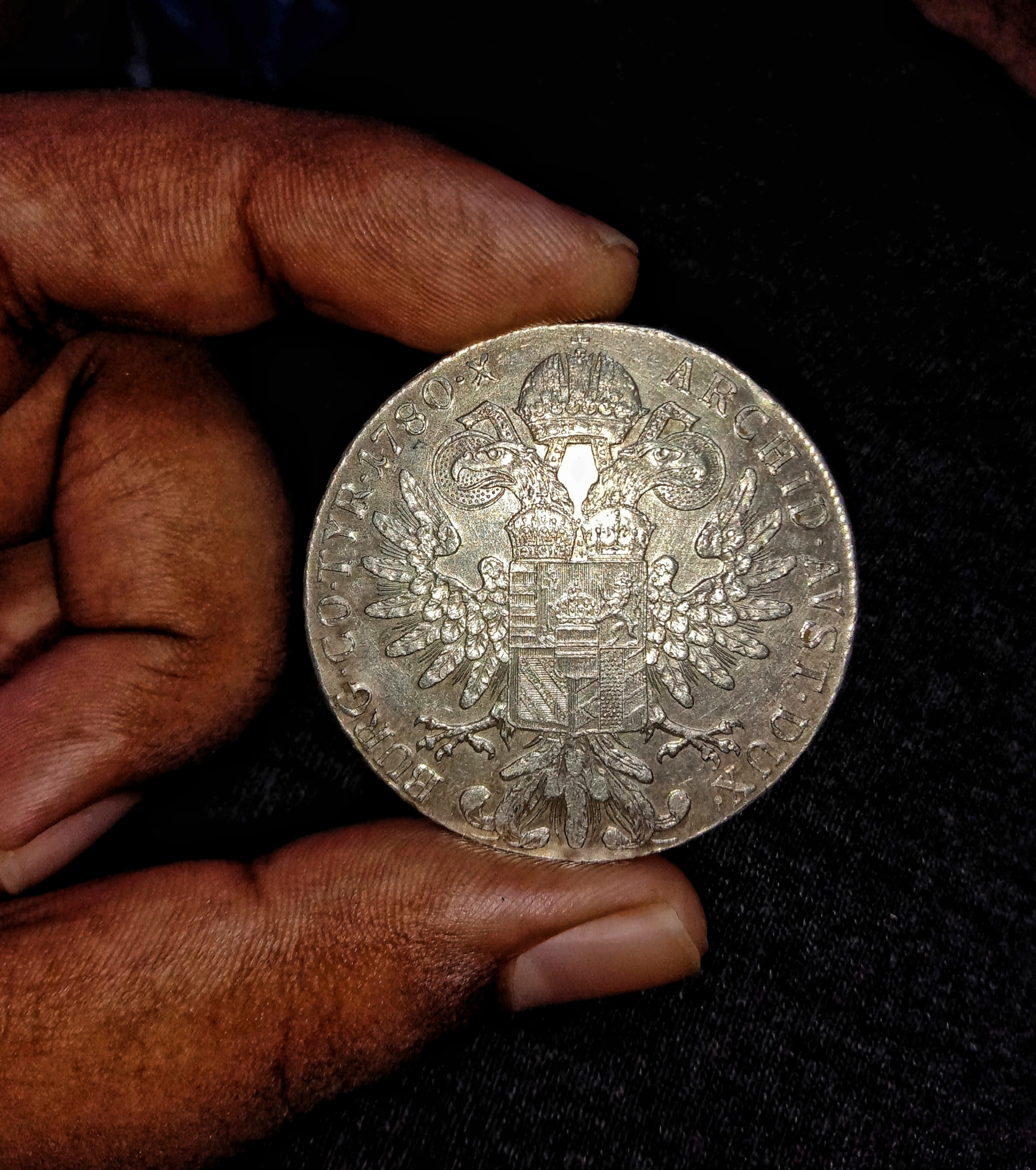
Reverse of a restrike Maria Theresa thaler

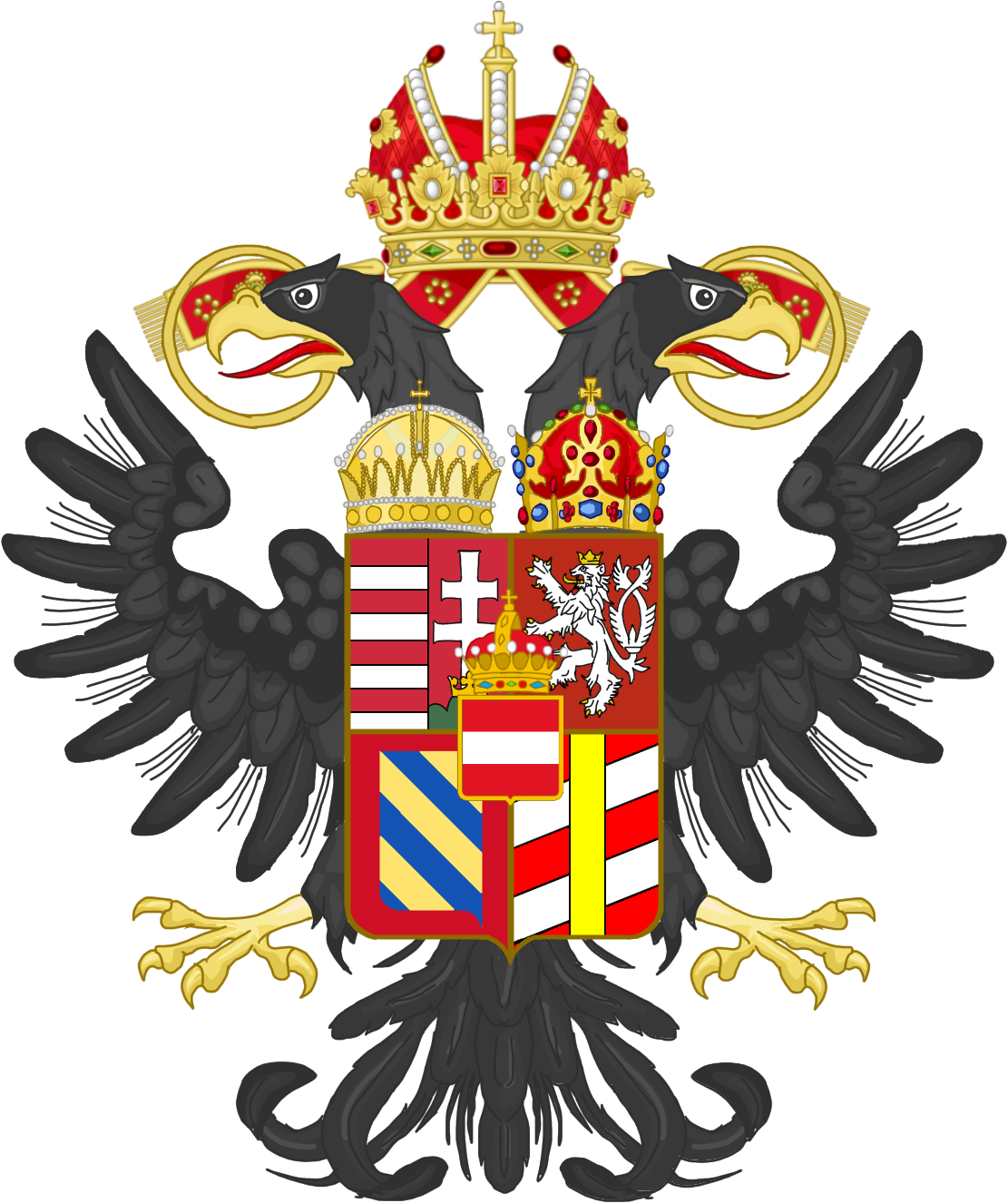
The coat of arms used on the reverse of the Maria Theresa thaler

The inscription on the obverse of this coin is in Latin: "M. THERESIA D. G. R. IMP. HU. BO. REG." and the reverse reads "ARCHID. AVST. DUX BURG. CO. TYR. 1780 X". Together they are an abbreviation of Maria Theresia, Dei Gratia Romanorum Imperatrix, Hungariae Bohemiaeque Regina, Archidux Austriae, Dux Burgundiae, Comes Tyrolis. 1780 ☓, which means, "Maria Theresa, by the grace of God, Empress of the Romans, Queen of Hungary and Bohemia, Archduchess of Austria, Duchess of Burgundy, Countess of Tyrol. 1780." The final "☓" is a saltire or Burgundian cross, and was added in 1750 indicating the new debased standard of the thaler. Around the rim of the coin is the motto of her reign: Justitia et Clementia, meaning "Justice and Clemency".

== Minting outside Austria ==
The MTT quickly became a standard trade coin and several nations began striking Maria Theresa thalers. The following mints have struck MTTs: Birmingham, Bombay, Brussels, London, Paris, Rome, and Utrecht, in addition to the Habsburg mints in Günzburg, Hall in Tyrol, Karlsburg, Kremnica, Milan, Prague, and Vienna. Between 1751 and 2000, some 389 million were minted. These various mints distinguished their issues by slight differences in the design, with some of these evolving over time. In 1935 Mussolini gained a 25-year concession over the production of the MTT. The Italians blocked non-Italian banks and bullion traders from obtaining the coin and so France, Belgium, and the UK started producing the coin to support their economic interests in the Red Sea, Persian Gulf, and East Coast of Africa. In 1961 the 25-year concession ended and Austria made diplomatic approaches to the relevant governments requesting they cease production of the coin. The UK was the last government to agree formally to the request in February 1962.

The MTT came to be used as currency in large parts of Africa and the Middle East until after World War II. It was common from North Africa to Somalia, Ethiopia, Kenya, down the coast of Tanzania to Mozambique, and in the Arabian Peninsula (Oman, Yemen). Its popularity in the Red Sea region was such that merchants would not accept any other type of currency. The Italian government produced a similarly designed coin in the hope of replacing the Maria Theresa thaler, but it never gained acceptance.

The Maria Theresa thaler was also formerly the currency of the Hejaz, Yemen, and the Aden Protectorate, as well as Muscat and Oman on the Arabia peninsula. There it was widely used for traditional jewellery, both as a source of silver, and as a decoration itself. The coin remains popular in North Africa and the Middle East to this day in its original form: a silver coin with a portrait of the ruler on the front and the Habsburg Double Eagle on the back.

In the United Kingdom, the Maria Theresa thaler bearing the date of 1780 is a "protected coin" under Part II of the Forgery and Counterfeiting Act 1981.

== Ethiopia ==
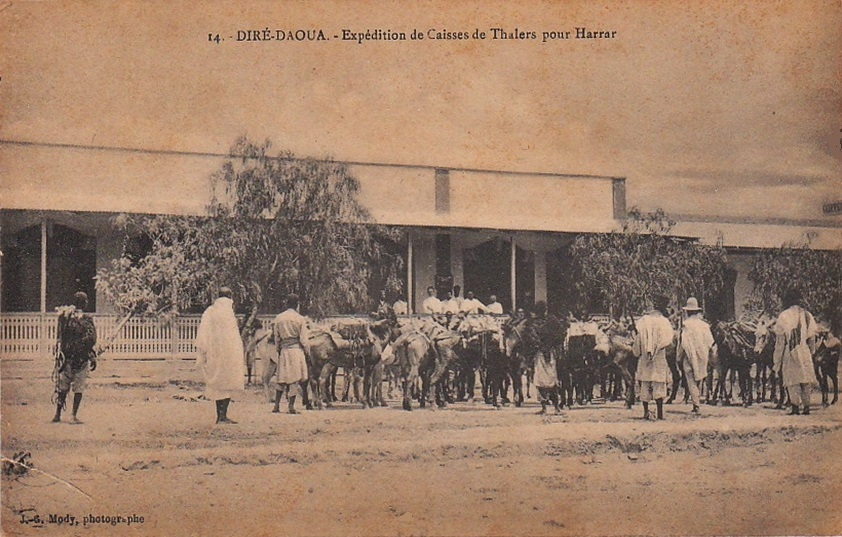
Shipping crates of MTT in Ethiopia, c. 1910

The MTT is first recorded as circulating in Ethiopia from Emperor Iyasu II of Ethiopia (1730–1755). According to traveller James Bruce, the coin, not debased as other currencies, dominated the areas he visited in 1768. Joseph Kalmer and Ludwig Hyun in the book Abessinien estimate that over 20% of 245 million coins minted until 1931 ended up in Ethiopia.

In 1868, the British military expedition to Magdala, the capital of Emperor Tewodros II of Ethiopia, under Field Marshal Robert Napier, took MTTs with them to pay local expenses. In 1890 the Italians introduced the Tallero Eritreo, styled after the MTT, in their new colony Eritrea, also hoping to impose it on the commerce with Ethiopia. They remained, however, largely unsuccessful.

In the early 1900s, Menelik II unsuccessfully attempted to mint Menelik thalers locally, with his effigy, but styled following the model of the MTT, and force their use. The newly established Bank of Abyssinia also issued banknotes denominated in thalers. Starting in 1935 the Italians minted the MTT at the mint in Rome for use in their conquest of Ethiopia. Then during World War II, the British minted some 18 million MTTs in Bombay to use in their East African Campaign to drive the Italians out of Ethiopia.
