= Commercial Bank Chad =

Chadian commercial bank

- Industry: Finance
- Headquarters: N'Djamena, Chad
- Key people: Abassalah Youssouf (president); Issa Orozi Batil (CEO); Georges Djajo (managing director)
- Products: Financial services
- Website: https://www.cbt-bank.com/

Commercial Bank Chad, also spelled as Commercial Bank Tchad (CBT), is a commercial bank in the Republic of Chad. It is a member of the Commercial Bank Group and is affiliated with the Commercial Bank of Cameroon (CBC), Commercial Bank Centrafrique (CBCA), the Commercial Bank Equatorial Guinea (CBGE) and Commercial Bank São Tomé and Príncipe (CBSTP).

== Ownership ==
The shareholding in Commercial Bank Tchad is as depicted in the table below:

Commercial Bank Chad stock ownership
| Rank | Name of owner | Percentage ownership |
|---|---|---|
| 1 | Fotso Group of Cameroon | 50.68 |
| 2 | Government of Chad | 17.48 |
| 3 | Chadian financial institutions | 21.87 |
| 4 | Private Chadian investors | 04.59 |
| 5 | Multinational banks | 05.38 |
| | Total | 100.00 |

== See also ==
- Commercial Bank Group
- Commercial Bank of Cameroon
- Central Bank of Central African States
