= Nib International Bank =

Private commercial bank in Ethiopia

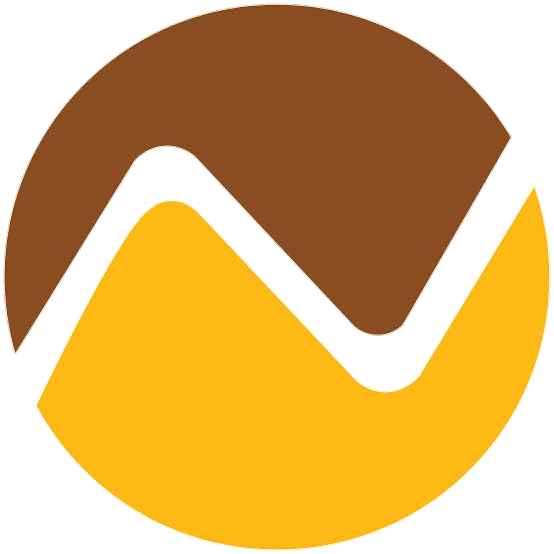
- Native name: ንብ ኢንተርናሽናል ባንክ
- Type: Private
- Industry: Financial
- Founded: 26 May 1999; 27 years ago
- Headquarters: Ras Abebe Aragay St, Sengatera, Addis Ababa, Ethiopia
- Number of locations: 48 (2024)
- Area served: Ethiopia
- Key people: Emebet Melese (President); Shisema Shewaneka (Chairman); Wondimu Tekle (Deputy Chairman)
- Services: ATM; Mobile banking Forex trading
- Revenue: 8.9 billion birr (2022)
- Total assets: 77 billion birr (2023)
- Owner: Nib International Bank S.C.
- Number of employees: 8,000 (2023)
- Website: www.nibbanksc.com

Nib International Bank (Amharic: ንብ ኢንተርናሽናል ባንክ; NIB) is a private commercial bank in Ethiopia established in 1999 by 717 shareholders, in accordance with Proclamation No. 84/1994 of the Ethiopian Commercial Code. It is the sixth largest private bank in Ethiopia with paid up capital of 27.6 million birr and 150 million birr subscribed capital.

The new Nib Bank logo was changed in 2012. Starting from August 2015, the bank offers VisaCard which is believed to comfort foreign nationals to access Visa Card in Ethiopia. In December 2024, the bank launched Prepared Mastercard, an online payment system to bolster digital transactions in Ethiopia. In addition to that, Nib Bank introduced two digital payment applications, Nib Amber Pay and Nib Paystream in 2025.

== History ==
Nib International Bank was founded on 26 May 1999 under license no LBB/007/99 and Proclamation No. 84/1994 of the Ethiopian Commercial Code, with paid-up capital of 27.6 million birr and 150 million birr subscribed capital. Founded by 717 shareholders, the bank began its operation on 28 October 1999 with 27 employees.

Nib International Bank was the six licensed private bank in Ethiopia. On 3 July 2012, a new logo for Nib International Bank was created by StudioNet with 300,000 birr. Nib International Bank launched VisaCard to be operated from 24 August 2015. According to the president Kibru Fondja, the Visa Card should be given to tourists making Ethiopia comfortable place for tourist destination. In October 2020, the bank obtained 270 ATM, supported by local technological company Moti Engineering, which delivered the terminals.

On 5 December 2024, the bank launched Prepared Mastercard, in collaboration of Mastercard to access online mobile banking system across all branches. On 3 February 2025, Nib Bank introduced two digital payment applications, Nib Amber Pay and Nib Paystream.

== Revenue and assets ==
As of January 2025, Nib Bank revenue was 713.34 million birr with 11.4% growth rate according to 2023/24 fiscal year. Its assets, estimated as of 30 June 2023, was reached 77 billion birr with 25.3% increase from the previous year. Its net loan took portion of 53.3 billion birr.

== See also ==
- List of banks in Ethiopia
