= List of banks in the Central African Republic =

As of April 2024, there were four banks in activity in the Central African Republic.

== List of banks ==
- Banque Populaire Maroco-Centrafricaine, part of BCP Group
- Banque saharienne pour l'investissement et le commerce en Centrafrique, part of BSIC Group
- BFGI Banque Centrafrique, part of BGFIBank Group
- Ecobank Centrafrique, part of Ecobank Group

== See also ==
- Bank of Central African States
- List of banks in Africa
