= Development Bank of Ethiopia =

State-owned bank of Ethiopia

- Native name: የኢትዮጵያ ልማት ባንክ
- Industry: Financial services
- Founded: 1909
- Headquarters: Addis Ababa, Ethiopia
- Number of locations: 100 branches, 24 Districts
- Key people: Tegegnwork Getu (Chairman of the Board); Yohannes Ayalew (President)
- Net income: ETB 373,520,416.00
- Number of employees: 2400
- Website: www.dbe.com.et

The Development Bank of Ethiopia (DBE) is a specialized state-owned development financial institution, which is supervised by the Public Financial Enterprises Agency in Ethiopia.

The Development Bank of Ethiopia was the first development finance institution in Ethiopia and as such it was designed to: "(a) assist in the development of industrial and agricultural production... (and) (b) foster the investment of private capital for productive purposes..."

== History ==
The goal of this bank is to promote economic development via financing commerce, industry, agriculture, and manufacturing. Each period of Ethiopian political history has used the bank for different purposes. Thus, the bank has changed its name several times:

| Year | Name |
|---|---|
| 1945–1949 | Agricultural Bank of Ethiopia |
| 1949–1951 | Agricultural and Commercial Bank of Ethiopia |
| 1951–1970 | Development Bank of Ethiopia Share Company |
| 1964–1970 | Investment Bank of Ethiopia |
| 1970–1979 | Agricultural and Industrial Development Bank Share Company |
| 1979–1994 | Agricultural and Industrial Development Bank |
| 1994–present | Development Bank of Ethiopia |

=== Imperial era (1909−1974) ===
The bank was established in 1909 as the Societe Nationale d'Ethiopie Pour le Development de l'agriculture et de Commerce. In 1945, the Agricultural Bank was established but was replaced by the Development Bank in 1951. In 1970, the bank was temporarily renamed to the Agricultural and Industrial Development Bank but was renamed back to the Development Bank of Ethiopia in 1994.

==== Loans granted by size, 1951 to September 1961 ====
| | Below Eth$50,000 | | Eth$51–250,000 | | Over Eth$250,000 | | Totals | |
| Type | No. | Amt. in 000s | No. | Amt. in 000s | No. | Amt. in 000s | No. | Amt. in 000s |
|---|---|---|---|---|---|---|---|---|
| Industry | 241 | 3,271 | 18 | 2,354 | 34 | 12,180 | 293 | 17,805 |
| Agriculture | 3,005 | 9,089 | 16 | 1,533 | 2 | 1,515 | 3,023 | 12,237 |
| Totals | 3,246 | 12,360 | 34 | 3,897 | 36 | 13,695 | 3,316 | 30,042 |
| Percent | 97.9 | 41.1 | 1.0 | 13.3 | 1.1 | 45.6 | 100.0 | 100.0 |

==== Composition of loans, 1951 to September 1961 ====
| Industrial loans | | | Agricultural loans | | |
| Material | No. | Amt. | Material | No. | Amt |
|---|---|---|---|---|---|
| Textiles | 6.1% | 31.4% | General agriculture | 52.8% | 51.1% |
| Foodstuffs & drinks | 52.0% | 38.3% | Coffee | 47.2% | 48.9% |
| Others | 41.9% | 30.3% | | | |
| Total | 100.0% | 100.0% | Total | 100.0% | 100.0% |

The geographical distribution of projects financed by the Development Bank also indicates the uneven regional development of the country. Nearly 57 percent of the industrial projects financed by the bank were located in or around Addis Ababa. The larger cities in the three provinces of Shewa (excluding Addis Ababa), Harrar and Eritrea accounted for nearly 36 percent of industrial loans in number and absorbed over 50 percent of the total value of industrial loans. As regards agriculture, the three provinces of Kaffa, Illubabor, and Sidamo received slightly over 49 percent of the total value of agricultural loans and accounted for over 47 percent of the total number. These three provinces are in the coffee producing regions of Ethiopia.

The bank's policy of requiring collateral valued at 200 percent or more of the amount of the loan requested had adverse effects. The security requirement directed loans to the urban areas, where property values are high, and excluded loans to potentially productive areas where no title deeds exist or where communal ownership prevails. The Development Bank, as a tool for large-scale development, had not accomplished all of the objectives. One of the weaknesses of the bank was a passive attitude. It would have been more desirable if it had sought promising avenues of investment rather than to wait to be approached by applicants. Some 85 percent of the number of loans made by the bank were overdue. These include 97 percent of small agricultural loans (up to Eth$2,000), about 80 percent of the industrial of the industrial loans, nearly 78 percent of the coffee loans, and over 65 percent of the agricultural development loans. However, the 85 percent of outstanding loans overdue represented less than 27 percent of the total amount outstanding. The multiplicity of forms of land tenure, the prevalence of tenant cultivation, the absence of legally defined landlord-tenant relationships, and the lack of cadastral surveys and clearly defined certificates of ownership have restricted the bank's activities.

=== Derg (1974–1991) ===
After the 1974 Ethiopian Revolution the fate of the bank was uncertain as it was a part of the imperial government. On January 1, 1975, the Derg nationalized the Agricultural and Industrial Development Bank (along with all other private and state banks in the country) to fall under the control of the National Bank of Ethiopia.

=== FDRE (1991–present) ===
After the Derg was defeated, the Transitional Government of Ethiopia sought to reverse the Derg's communist policies. The EPRDF established the New Economic Policy which opened up the financial sector, thus giving the Development Bank independence from the National Bank.

== Governance structure ==
A Board of Management (BOM) consisting of seven senior government officials administers the bank. The president of the bank also attends the regular meetings of the BOM as a non-voting member. The two top bodies (Public Enterprises for Financial Agency (PEFA) and BOM are, among others, responsible for issuing major policies of the bank, approval of its strategic and operational plans as well as the close and regular monitoring of the bank's operations. The top Executive Management Committee (EMC), which consists of the president and six vice presidents, is a direct responsible body to oversee the overall operations of the bank. The president chairs the EMC and acts as an official representative of the bank. Fifty two management members are, on the other hand, responsible for the day-to-day management of the bank's operational activities.

The bank's BOM has established separate Compliance and Risk Management and Internal Audit Directorates for the implementation of policies and procedures. Ethical Conduct and Complaint Management is also part of DBE's culture. Accordingly, the bank has an Ethics and Compliant Management Office under the direct supervision of the president.

== Criticisms ==
There is an apparent need to expand and strengthen the bank's staff so that there will be more viable loans. Also, there is a need to develop an engineering staff or consultant arrangements to assist in and review cost estimates and determine the suitability of the technical process selected. Furthermore, supervised agricultural credit should be developed to see that loans are properly utilized and repayment made on time.

== See also ==
- List of banks in Ethiopia
