= Union Bank of Cameroon =

Commercial bank in Cameroon

Union Bank of Cameroon Plc. (UBC), is a commercial bank in Cameroon. It is one of the commercial banks licensed by the Central Bank of Central African States, the national banking regulator.

== History ==
UBC was established in 1999 by a network of credit unions in Cameroon to provide retail banking services to individuals and businesses. In 2008, Oceanic Bank, a regional banking conglomerate based in Lagos, Nigeria, acquired majority shareholding in UBC, becoming the core investor.

== See also ==
- List of banks in Cameroon
- Economy of Cameroon
