= Commercial Bank Centrafrique =

- Industry: Finance
- Headquarters: Bangui, Central African Republic
- Products: Financial services

Commercial Bank Centrafrique (CBCA) is one of the largest banks in the Central African Republic. It is a member of the Commercial Bank Group and is affiliated with the Commercial Bank Tchad (CBT), the Commercial Bank of Cameroon (CBC), the Commercial Bank Equatorial Guinea (CBGE) and Commercial Bank São Tomé and Príncipe (CBSTP).

== See also ==
- Commercial Bank Group
- Commercial Bank of Cameroon
- List of banks in the Central African Republic
