= Awash Bank =

Commercial bank in Ethiopia

Awash Bank S.C.
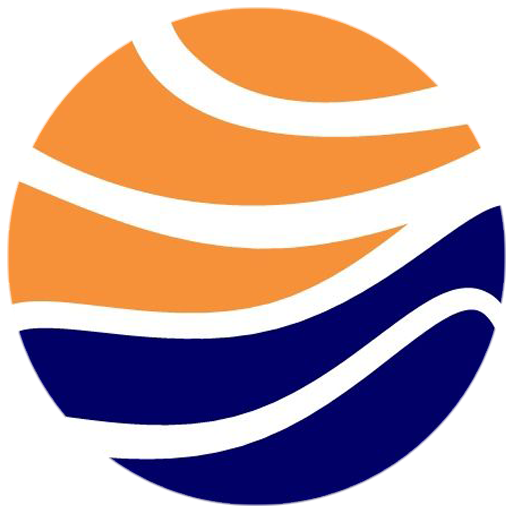
- Native name: አዋሽ ባንክ
- Company type: Commercial
- Industry: Finance
- Founded: 10 November 1994; 31 years ago
- Headquarters: Airport Road, Addis Ababa, Ethiopia; 8.9920°N 38.7820°E
- Key people: Tsehay Shiferaw (CEO); Yohannes Merga (CIO); Tadesse Gemeda (Chief Wholesale Banking Officer); Ato Henock Tessema (Chief Retail & SME Banking Officer); Tilahun Geleta (Chief Finance & Facilities Management Officer); Abebe Deressa (Chief Corporate Strategy Officer); Dessalegn Tolera (Chief Credit Operation Officer)
- Products: Financial services
- Revenue: 5.87 billion birr (2020/21)
- Owner: Awash Bank S.C
- Number of employees: More than 18,000
- Website: www.awashbank.com

Awash Bank formerly known as Awash International Bank (Amharic: አዋሽ ኢንተርናሽናል ባንክ) is a commercial bank in Ethiopia that was established in 1994 by 486 founding shareholders with a paid-up capital of birr 24.2 million and started banking operations on 13 February 1995. As of end of June 2020 the number of shareholders and its paid-up capital increased to over 4,369 and Birr 5.87 billion, respectively. Likewise, as of end June 2020, bank's total assets reached Birr 95.6 billion with over 700 branches found across the country, Awash Bank continues to be leading private commercial bank in Ethiopia.

== History ==
Awash International Bank was founded on 10 November 1994 and started operation on 13 February 1995 with 486 shareholders and paid-up capital of 24.2 million birr. It is named after Awash River. In 2013/14 fiscal year, the bank gained roughly more than 1.37 billion birr, accounting 40% of the whole private banks.

On 24 November 2014, Awash partnered with Misys FusionBanking Essence, a financial software company, to boost its continual growth and the branching process.

== See also ==
- List of banks in Ethiopia
