= Crédit Communautaire d'Afrique Bank =

Financial institution based in Cameroon

Crédit Communautaire d’Afrique Bank
- Trade name: CCA Bank
- Company type: Private
- Industry: Banking
- Founded: July 1997
- Founder: Albert Nkemla
- Headquarters: Douala, Cameroon (new headquarters inaugurated October 19, 2024)
- Number of locations: As of 2024, (approximately 54 branches across 25 cities and about 60+ ATMs)
- Key people: Marguerite Fonkwen Atanga (Managing director); Albert Nkemla (Founder, former CEO)
- Products: Retail banking; Loans; Savings; Islamic finance; Digital banking; Financial services
- Total assets: ▲US$862 million (2022)
- Website: cca-bank.com%20cca-bank.com

Crédit Communautaire d'Afrique Bank (commonly referred to as CCA Bank) is a Cameroonian financial institution. Established in 1997, and is one of the 15th Cameroonian commercial banks licensed by the Central Bank of Central African States. offering a wide range of financial services tailored to individuals, businesses, and organizations.

Initially a cooperative savings and credit company, it became a limited company in 2006, with a share capital increased to more than 29 billion FCFA. Its head office is located in Douala, the economic capital of Cameroon, its founder and CEO is Albert Nkemla.

== History ==
Founded in July 1997 in Bafoussam, CCA-Bank started operations in 1998 as a cooperative savings and credit association under Cameroonian cooperative law. In 2001, it became a category-II microfinance institution licensed by COBAC. In 2006, it transitioned to a société anonyme (public company), raising its capital to CFA 2 billion. By 2010, its capital grew to CFA 5 billion, enabling expansion to 42 branches across Cameroon.

CCA-Bank received its license to operate as a universal bank on May 30, 2018, becoming Cameroon’s 15th commercial bank. And expanded its assets, branch network, and digital services.

In June 2023, CCA partnered with, International Finance Corporation (IFC), a World Bank Group member, providing a CFA 10 billion loan to support lending to small and medium-sized enterprises (SMEs) in Cameroon. The agreement required at least 25% of the funds to benefit businesses owned or led by women, aligning with the bank’s focus on financial inclusion and gender equity.

=== Leadership ===
The bank was founded by Albert Nkemla, a Cameroonian businessman and banker. Nkemla has overseen the institution's development from a microfinance entity to a full-service commercial bank. Under his leadership, the bank's capital grew from CFA 1 billion at its inception to over CFA 34 billion by the mid-2020s. In 2024, Nkemla was honored with the rank of Grand Officier of Cameroon’s Order of Value for his contributions to the financial sector.

In 2009, the bank separated the functions of Chairman of the Board of Directors (PCA) and Managing Director (DG) to strengthen governance. In April 2023, Marguerite Fonkwen Atanga a banker, was appointed Managing Director and CEO, becoming one of the few female bank CEOs in the CEMAC region.

== Services and social impact ==
CCA-Bank provides banking services for individuals, SMEs, corporations, and public entities, and has introduced digital payment options including SMS and Internet banking. It emphasizes financial inclusion through its Women Banking Program and supports youth empowerment by sponsoring leadership initiatives like the Cameroon Leadership Academy. In April 2025, the Islamic Corporation for the Development of the Private Sector (ICD) disbursed €15 million to CCA‑Bank to support SMEs and expand its Islamic finance window.

=== Islamic Finance Window ===
CCA-Bank launched its Islamic finance services under the label CCA-Bank Islamic Finance in early 2022. On March 20, 2025, COBAC granted partial authorization for this activity, allowing dedicated operations and the opening of specialized branches in Yaoundé and Douala.
