= Bank of Abyssinia =

Commercial bank in Ethiopia

- Company type: Commercial bank
- Founded: 1905; 121 years ago 16 February 1906; 120 years ago (inaugurated)
- Headquarters: Addis Ababa, Ethiopia
- Number of locations: 928
- Area served: Ethiopia; Zimbabwe (formerly)
- Key people: Bekalu Zeleke (President)
- Total assets: ETB 218,513,875,231 (2024)
- Number of employees: 11575 (2024)
- Website: www.bankofabyssinia.com

The Bank of Abyssinia (Amharic: አቢሲንያ ባንክ) is a commercial bank and the oldest bank in Ethiopia. It was established in 1905 and inaugurated by Emperor Menelik II on 16 February 1906, becoming the modern bank of Ethiopia.

In 1915, the bank was the first to produce banknote with the help of British owned National Bank of Egypt. The bank then changed the name to the Bank of Ethiopia during Emperor Haile Selassie regime in 1931. After nationalization by the Derg government, the bank was re-established as one of leading private banks with share company status.

== History ==
The Bank of Abyssinia is the first modern bank in Ethiopia established in 1905 and inaugurated on 16 February 1906 by Emperor Menelik II; opening its office in Addis Ababa and Harare. In 1915, the bank began issuing banknote funded by the British owned National Bank of Egypt. Still, Ethiopians used Maria Theresa thaler. During Emperor Haile Selassie regime, the bank was re-established as Bank of Ethiopia.

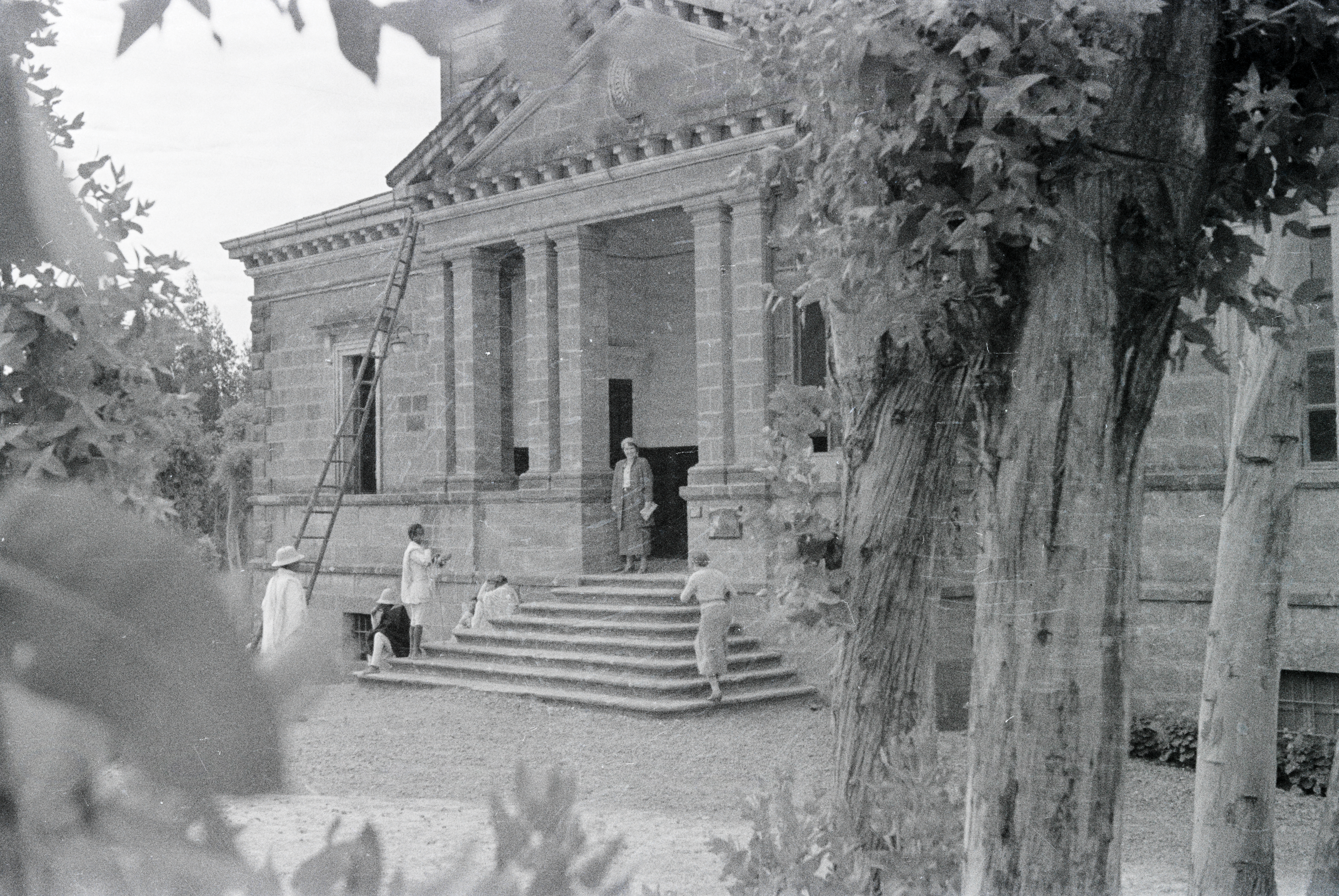
Bank of Abyssinia in 1934

After 1974, the bank was nationalized by the Derg government and merged to Commercial Bank of Ethiopia. On 16 February 1996, at the 90th anniversary of its inauguration, the bank was re-established as a private share company with the same name and logo. Since then, the bank emerged as one of leading banks in Ethiopia offering various product and service to individuals and companies.

== Leading people ==
- Bekalu Zeleke Chief Executive Officer
- Sosina Mengesha Chief Digital Banking Officer
- Daniel Hailu Chief Information Officer
- Asaminew Deribew Chief Credit Business Officer
- Abreham Gebeyehu Chief Finance Officer
- Mohammed Nuredin Chief International Banking Officer
- Abdulkadir Redwan Chief IFB Officer
- Meseret Asfaw Chief Enterprise Service Officer
- Seifu Bogale Chief Coroporate Human Resource Officer
- Desalegn Yizengaw Chief Customer Acquisition and Support
- Yetinayet Awgichew Chief Risk and Compliance Officer
- Eyassu Mekonnen Chief Internal Auditor

== See also ==
- List of banks in Ethiopia
