= National Financial Credit Bank =

Commercial bank in Cameroon

National Financial Credit Bank SA (NFCB) is a commercial bank in Cameroon. It is one of the fourteen licensed commercial banks in the country.

== History ==
NFCB was formed in 1989 as National Finance Credit Company' (NFCC). Since its inception, NFCC functioned as a savings and credit institution. In 2006, NFCC received a full banking license and rebranded to its current name. Upon the direction of the Central Bank of Central African States, Loita Capital Partners International, a Mauritius-based investment banking company, was invited to invest in NFCB and provide technical and expert guidance during the transition from a savings and credit institution to a fully fledged commercial bank. It was founded by an Oshie man from West Cameroon by the name of Awanga.

== Branches ==
As of January 2007, NFCC maintained seven networked branches across Cameroon.

== See also ==
- List of banks in Cameroon
- Economy of Cameroon
