= Dashen Bank =

Private bank in Ethiopia

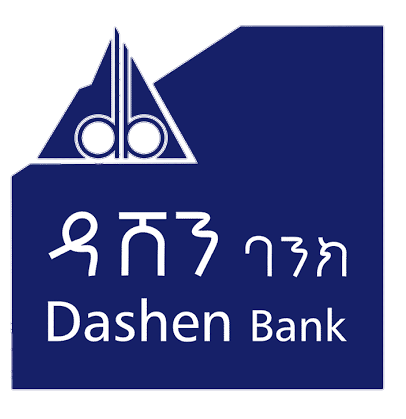
- Native name: ዳሸን ባንክ
- Company type: Private
- Industry: Financial
- Founded: 20 September 1995; 30 years ago
- Headquarters: Susan St, Addis Ababa, Ethiopia
- Number of locations: 900 (2024)
- Area served: Ethiopia
- Key people: Ayele Teshome (CEO); Elias Hussien (Chief Strategy Officer); Eyerusalem Wagaw (Chief Experience Officer); Getnet Dessie (Chief Risk and Compliance Officer); Hewate Kefelegn (Chief People Officer)
- Services: ATM; E-commerce; Mobile banking
- Operating income: 5.07 billion birr (2023/2024)
- Total assets: 183.7 billion birr (2024)
- Website: dashenbanksc.com

Dashen Bank (Amharic: ዳሸን ባንክ) is a private bank in Ethiopia founded in 1995 by 11 Ethiopian businessmen and bankers. Named after the highest mountain in Ethiopia, Ras Dashen, it began operation in the next year, leading the private banking sectors.

The bank launched an online payment system SuperApp in 2025.

== History ==
Dashen Bank was founded on 20 September 1995 by 11 group of businessman and bankers. On 1 January 1996, the bank began its operation with 11 branches. The bank is named after Ras Dashen, the highest mountain peak in Ethiopia.

On 21 November 2023, Dashen Bank joined a membership of SME finance Forum. The CEO of SME finance Qamar Saleem said "SME Finance Forum is delighted to welcome Dashen Bank, a leading bank in Ethiopia and Africa, into our network. I am confident they will further contribute towards our decade-long efforts in expanding access to financial services for SMEs. We have been building a global network of SME-focused institutions imparting knowledge, scaling innovations, sharing best practices and influencing policy shifts, and we are proud to welcome Dashen Bank today". On 28 December 2023, the bank launched an online credit payment service along with Ethiopian Airlines. In January 2025, the bank launched Dashen Bank SuperApp, an online banking platform.

== See also ==
- List of banks in Ethiopia
