= Banque Populaire Maroco-Centrafricaine =

Banque Populaire Maroco Centrafricaine
- Industry: Finance
- Headquarters: Bangui
- Products: Financial services

Banque Populaire Maroco Centrafricaine (BPMC) is a major bank in the Central African Republic. It is affiliated with La Banque Centrale Populaire in Morocco.

== See also ==
- List of banks in the Central African Republic
