= Pebuu =

Ugandan financial technology company

- Trade name: Pebuu Africa
- Type: Private
- Industry: FinTech
- Founded: 2015; 11 years ago
- Founder: John Paul Ssemyalo
- Headquarters: Kampala, Uganda
- Area served: East, West Africa, and Southern Africa; North America
- Key people: John Paul Ssemyalo (Chief Executive Officer), Leonard Mutebi (Chief Operating Officer), Elizabeth Atuhairwe (Head of Business Operations)
- Services: Bank agent and merchant compliance monitoring, risk control, geo-mapping and field service management, last-mile delivery
- Website: www.pebuu.com

Pebuu (trading as Pebuu Africa) is a Ugandan fintech and technology company that provides payments systems for merchants and for banks and other financial institutions in Uganda.

== History ==
=== Foundation ===
Pebuu Limited was registered on September 25, 2015, in Uganda by John Paul Ssemyalo. In 2023, the company reserved the name Pebuu Africa (U) Limited and has been using its trade name Pebuu Africa.

Pebuu entered the FinTech landscape in Uganda when the country was experiencing a boom in digitalisation of payments and financial services in the mid 2010s, as well as the rise of startups in the FinTech arena.

Pebuu was one of the first e-payment platforms in Uganda and occupied a niche as a digital payment aggregator and competed with payment enablers such as EzeeMoney or PayWay. In 2016, some media outlets named Pebuu a "market leader." Pebuu offered a platform that facilitated transactions with multiple service providers, including telecoms and mobile money operators in Uganda and major water and electricity utilities. The platform allowed people to deposit and withdraw cash, send digital money transactions, and pay bills through Pebuu agents who were using POS machines or the Pebuu mobile app with or without the Pebuu Card. In 2021, Pebuu claimed to have 2400 agents and reported partnering with several banks in Uganda to enable digital payments.

=== Change of direction ===
After the COVID-19 pandemic in 2020, the company discontinued its services through Pebuu agents and redefined its business strategy aligning with the growing ecosystem of agency banking in Uganda. In 2023, they expanded their operations by establishing 320 service points across Uganda to monitor and supervise bank agents. In 2024, Pebuu declared supervising and conducting compliance monitoring to over 20,000 bank agents and merchants recruited by Centenary and Stanbic banks in Uganda. Previous Pebuu products were discontinued, and new products and services were introduced, including field service management technology with geomapping features. In 2025, Pebuu claimed that its supervised bank agent networks grew by over 10% managing bank agents of Centenary, Stanbic, Housing Finance, and Absa banks in Uganda and increasing compliance rates up to 80%. In addition to partnering with banks, in 2024, Pebuu entered into a partnership with Hamilton Telecom to accelerate the adoption of telecom services utilising Pebuu networks across the country.

In 2025, Pebuu received Global Brands Award for the Most Innovative Field Service Management Platform named FieldPecker. In May, 2026, Pebuu Limited secured ISO/IEC 27001:2022 certification for its Information Security Management System.

=== Expansion ===
Pebuu expanded its operations to several countries in Africa. In 2025, they legally registered their presence in Ghana, Nigeria, and DR Congo in West Africa; Tanzania, Kenya, and Ethiopia in East Africa; South Africa, Zambia, and Zimbabwe in Southern Africa.

On June 5, 2024, Pebuu opened an extension arm for its global operations in Delaware, U.S., registering it as Pebuu Global Inc.

== Pebuu School Product ==
Using its payment and deposit platform, Pebuu launched a programme named "Pebuu School Product" which offered a digital wallet attached to Pebuu School Card to pupils in Ugandan schools. The students could receive pocket money sent by their caretakers to the card to pay for services at school.

In 2023, Pebuu received the Go Global Award in the FinTech category for this product.
