= Commercial Bank Cameroon =

Commercial bank in Cameroon

- Industry: Finance
- Founded: 1997
- Headquarters: Douala, Cameroon
- Key people: Yves-Michel Fotso, President; Jean Pierre Coti, Director General
- Services: Banking
- Net income: US$3 million (2007)
- Total assets: US$309 million (2007)
- Subsidiaries: SFA Financial Products
- Website: Homepage

Commercial Bank Cameroon (CBC), also referred to as Commercial Bank of Cameroon, is a commercial bank in Cameroon. It is one of the 19 Cameroonian commercial banks licensed by the Central Bank of Central African States, the national banking regulator. The bank caters to both individuals and businesses through a variety of financial products. CBC is the flagship of the Commercial Bank Group, headquartered in Douala, Cameroon, with subsidiaries in Chad, Central African Republic, Equatorial Guinea and São Tomé and Príncipe.

== History ==
In 1997, following the closure of the Cameroonian operations of several International banks, including Crédit Agricole, BICIC and Meridien BIAO, Cameroonian corporate investors, private Cameroonian citizens and the German Investment Corporation (DEG), pooled resources and put together FCFA 3 billion (approximately US$6.5 million) to start Commercial Bank of Cameroon. Over the years, the owners of CBC have expanded their operations to four other Central African countries. As of December 2007, the Commercial Bank of Cameroon had an estimated capital base of US$19 million and total assets of about US$309 million.

== Commercial Bank Group ==
As of October 2010, the following companies comprise the Commercial Bank Group:

- Commercial Bank of Cameroon (CBC) - Cameroon
- Commercial Bank Chad (CBT) - Chad
- Commercial Bank Centrafrique (CBCA) - Central African Republic
- Commercial Bank Equatorial Guinea (CBGE) - Equatorial Guinea
- Commercial Bank São Tomé and Príncipe (CBSTP) - São Tomé and Príncipe
- SFA Financial Products - Cameroon - Commercial Bank Group has 51.4% shareholding.

== Ownership ==
The stock of Commercial Bank Cameroon, is privately owned by Cameroonian and foreign investors. The major shareholders are listed in the table below:

Commercial Bank Cameroon Stock Ownership
Rank	Name of Owner	Percentage Ownership
1	Fotso Group of Cameroon	
2	SNAC Insurance Group of Cameroon	
3	Private Cameroonian Investors	
4	German Investment Corporation (DEG)	15.00
5	Other Non-Cameroonian Investors	13.06
	Total	100.00

== Branch network ==
The bank maintains branches at the following locations:

1. Maroua Branch - Maroua
2. Garoua Branch - Boulevard Lamido Hayatou, Garoua
3. Bafoussam Branch - Avenue de la Republique, Bafoussam
4. Akwa Branch - Boulevard de l'Unite, Akwa
5. Douala Branch - Boulevard Charles De Gaulle, Douala Main Branch
6. Yaoundé Branch - Yaoundé

== See also ==
- Commercial Bank Centrafrique
- Commercial Bank Group
- List of banks in Cameroon
- Central Bank of Central African States
