= Enat Bank =

Private commercial bank in Ethiopia

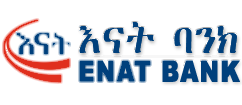
- Company type: Private commercial bank
- Industry: Financial
- Founded: 28 September 2013; 12 years ago
- Headquarters: Kirkos, Addis Ababa, Ethiopia
- Area served: Ethiopia
- Key people: Dr. Ermias Andarge (CEO)
- Revenue: 202,000,000 birr (2020)
- Operating income: 289,000,000 birr (2020/2021)
- Website: www.enatbanksc.com

Enat Bank (Amharic: እናት ባንክ) is a private commercial bank in Ethiopia. Founded in 2008 by nine female business promotors, the bank envisaged to maximize and promote female capability in economic inclusion. The bank is composed of 7,000 shareholders who have interest for investing the bank and most of 60% composed of female.

== Background ==
Enat Bank was founded on 28 September 2008 by 9 group of female business promotors, with vision to maximize women economic capabilities and to be inclusive bank. It consists of 11-person board of directors comprising 6 women and 5 men with different backgrounds. In the bank, there are more than 20,000 shareholders who have interest investing the bank and most of 60% composed of female. In September 2011, Enat Bank registered a capital of half a billion birr. The bank then submitted an application on in the banking industry.

The bank provides customer and commercial banking services coupled with non-financial services such as capacity building workshops and financial literacy programs for women. Enat ranked the second largest private bank in Ethiopia in terms of expansion of branch.

On 5 March 2013, the bank officially commenced its operation with banking industry incorporated to create a difference in the market by increasing women economic skills. Enat shares 2% of the private commercial bank deposit market and envisaged to develop its capital by 2030. In 2014/2015 fiscal year, the bank recorded 84% increase of profit after tax to 53.1 million birr in second year in business. As of 30 June 2015, the bank increased seven new branches, bringing the total to 14. An expansion helped the bank to mobilize its deposit of 1.7 billion birr, a 56% raise from 2013/2014 report.

== See also ==
- List of banks in Ethiopia
