= Equb =

Rotary savings and credit association in Ethiopia

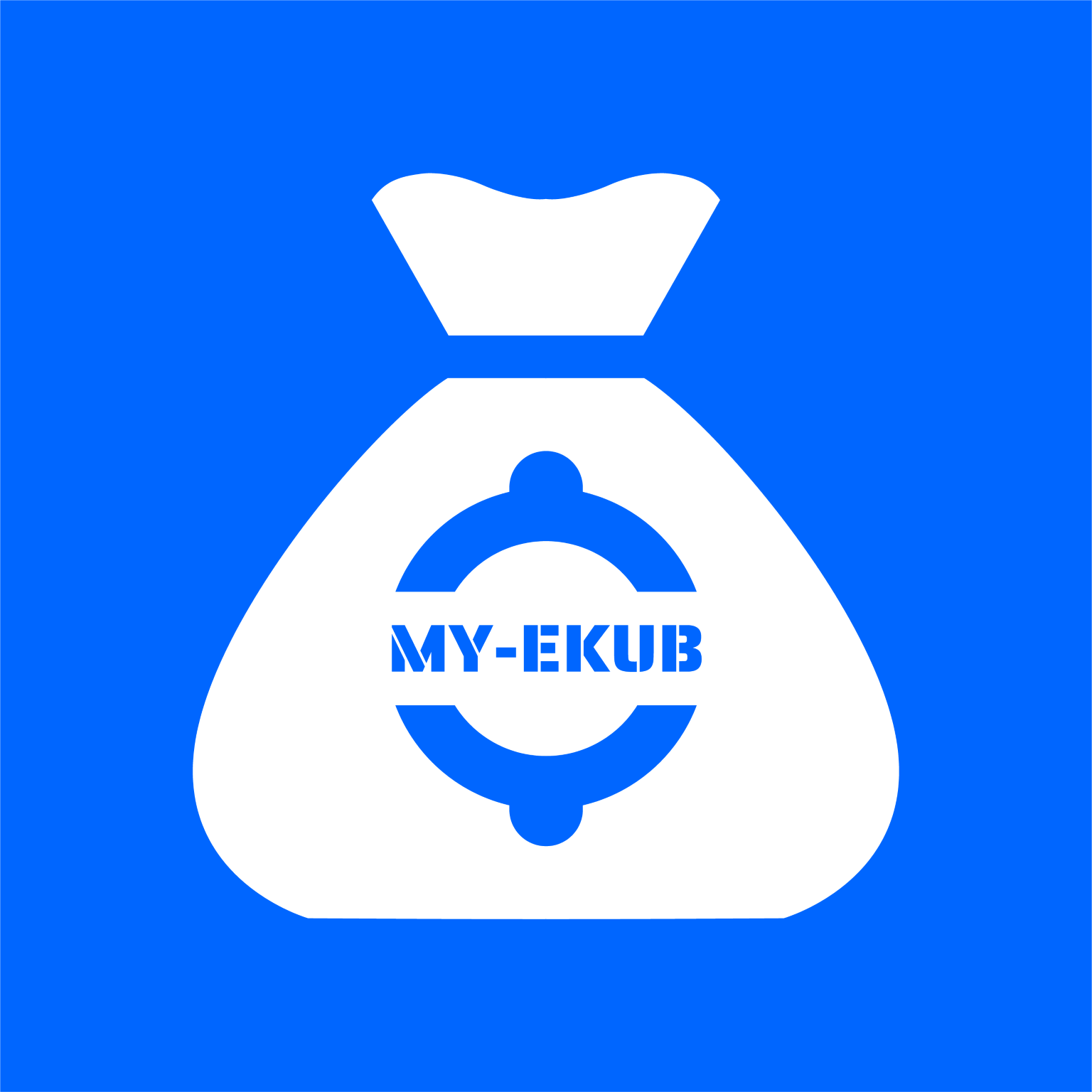
My Ekub

Equb, Iqub or Ekub ( Tigrinya: እቁብ) is a rotating savings and credit association of people in Eritrean and Ethiopian cultures with the aim of mobilizing resources and distributing them. It is distinguished from Eder by duration of time; Equb is temporary or permanent, while Eder is long-term association. Like Eder, Equb is a cooperative social institution, which helps for funeral insurance where community members elect their leaders, contribute resources either in kind or in cash and support the mourning member.

In Konso community, Equb dominates other financial establishments of micro and small enterprises, expansion and their working capital finance, followed by personal saving, families and relatives.
