= Lion Insurance Company =

Ethiopian private insurance company

- Native name: አንበሳ ኢንሹራንስ ኩባንያ
- Company type: Private
- Founded: June 2007; 19 years ago
- Area served: Ethiopia
- Key people: Aberham Mersha (CEO)
- Services: Insurance
- Revenue: 1.173 billion birr (2024)
- Net income: 61.3 million birr (2023)
- Total assets: 1.7 billion birr (2024)
- Owner: Lion Insurance Company S.C.
- Number of employees: 336 (2023)
- Website: www.anbessainsurance.com

Lion Insurance Company S.C. (Amharic: አንበሳ ኢንሹራንስ ኩባንያ) is an Ethiopian private insurance company established in 2007 by over 300 shareholders. It began operation a year later, with paid-up capital of 4.7 million birr.

== History ==
Lion Insurance Company S.C. was established in June 2007 by over 300 shareholders and began operation with initial paid-up capital of 4.7 million birr in the next year. On 24 May 2007, Lion Insurance Company issued application letter to the National Bank of Ethiopia (NBE) to sell share of 15 million birr.

In February 2023, Aberham Mersha has been the new CEO of Lion Insurance Company, replacing Negasi Yoseph. In June 2023, the company registered Gross Written Premium (GWP) of ETB 857,359,248.29. As of January 2024, the company had total assets of 1.7 billion birr and 244,071,787.71 paid-up capital.
