= Cooperative Bank of Oromia =

Private commercial bank in Ethiopia

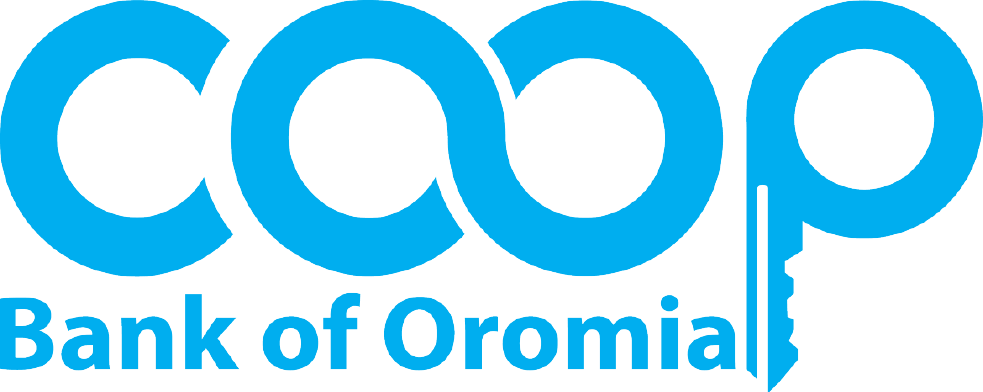

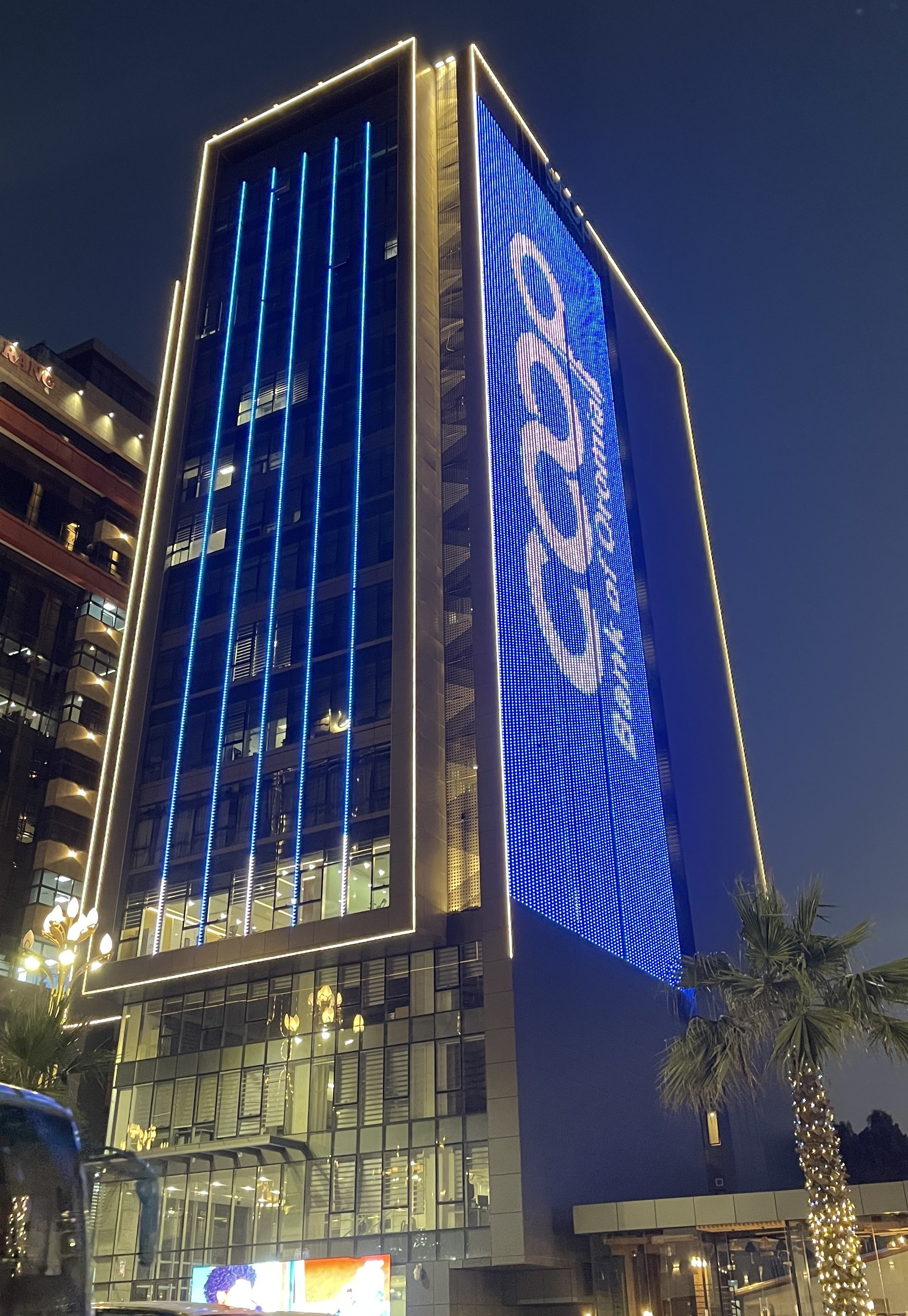
- Coopbank Headquarter in Addis Ababa
- Type: Share company
- Industry: Financial institution
- Founded: 8 March 2005; 21 years ago
- Founder: Obbo Haile Gebre Lube
- Headquarters: Bole sub-city, Woreda 02, Africa Avenue, Rwanda Embassy Area Addis Ababa, Ethiopia
- Number of locations: 702 (2026)
- Key people: Aaddee Meskerem Debebe (Board Chairperson); Obbo Deribie Asfaw (President)
- Products: Financial services
- Total assets: 257.61 billion ETB (As per the report October 2026)
- Number of employees: 13,375 (As per the report June 2026)
- Website: coopbankoromia.com.et 8.991854°N 38.780480°E

Cooperative Bank of Oromia (stylized as coop or coopbank) is a private commercial bank in Ethiopia, established in 2005 by Obbo Haile Gebre Lube. As per their last published annual report (2025-25), the Cooperative Bank now has a total asset value ETB 257.61 billion. The bank has over 702 branches,16.4 million account holders and 13,375 employees. The bank's headquarters is located in Addis Ababa, Ethiopia.

== History ==
The Cooperative Bank of Oromia was established following initiatives undertaken in the early 2000s to address limited access to formal financial services in Ethiopia, particularly for rural communities, farmers, and small businesses.A project office was established in 2002 under the leadership of Haile Gebre Lube to prepare for the creation of the bank. After completing the necessary organizational and regulatory processes, the bank commenced operations in March 2005.Since its establishment, Coopbank has focused on providing banking services aimed at improving access to finance and supporting economic participation.

== Financial performance ==
The Cooperative Bank of Oromia strengthened its digital banking strategy through a partnership with Xpert Digital. The bank’s performance and financial position are detailed in its Annual Report 2024/2025. In 2025, the bank was ranked among Africa’s Top 100 Banks. The bank operates over 753 branches across Ethiopia.The organizational structure of the bank .Michu is described as Ethiopia’s first uncollateralized digital lending platform. Cooperative Bank of Oromia unveils Visa card services with FIFA World Cup campaign.Cooperative Bank of Oromia digital transformation initiatives.

== Eco Branches ==
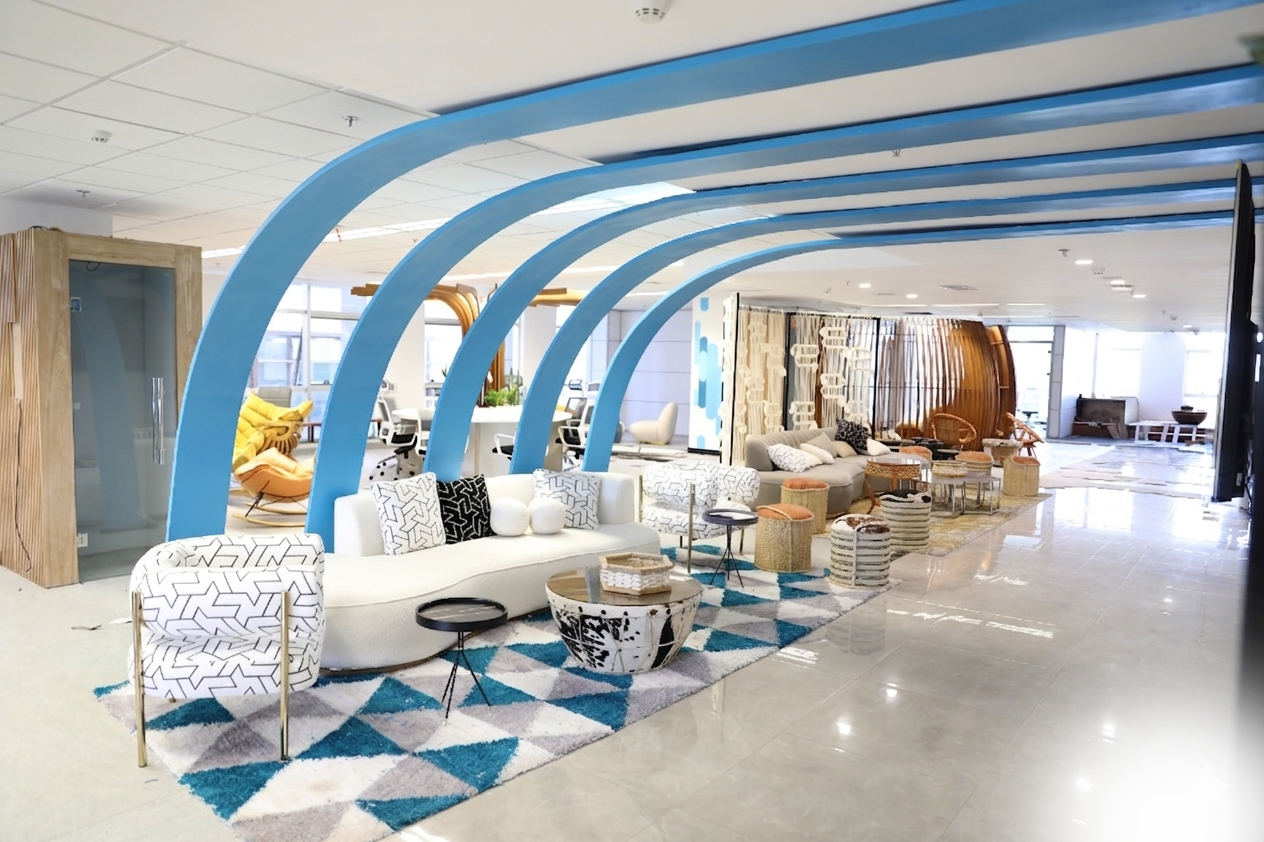
Dx-Valley incubation center

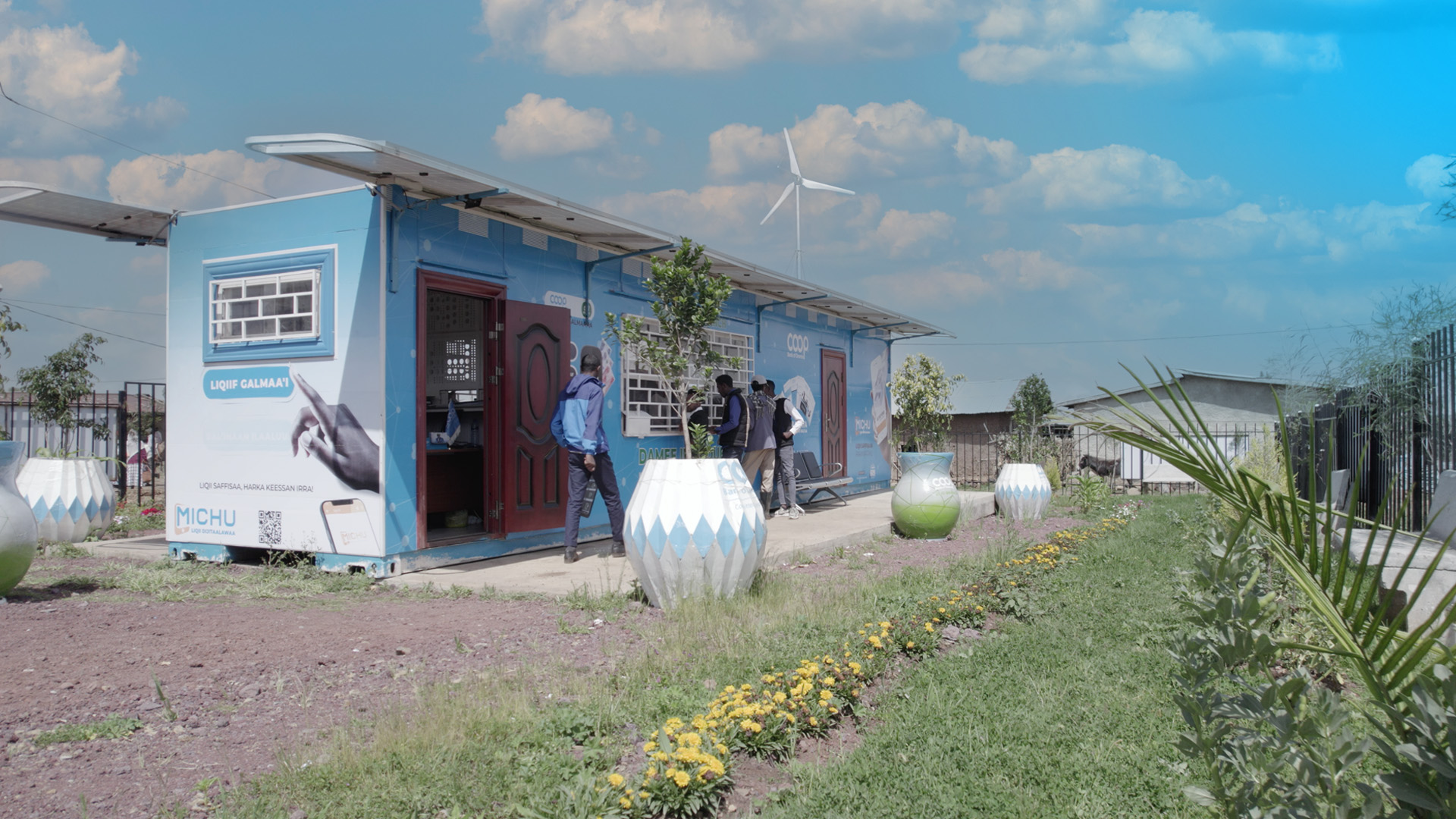
Coopbank Eco Branch in rural Ethiopia

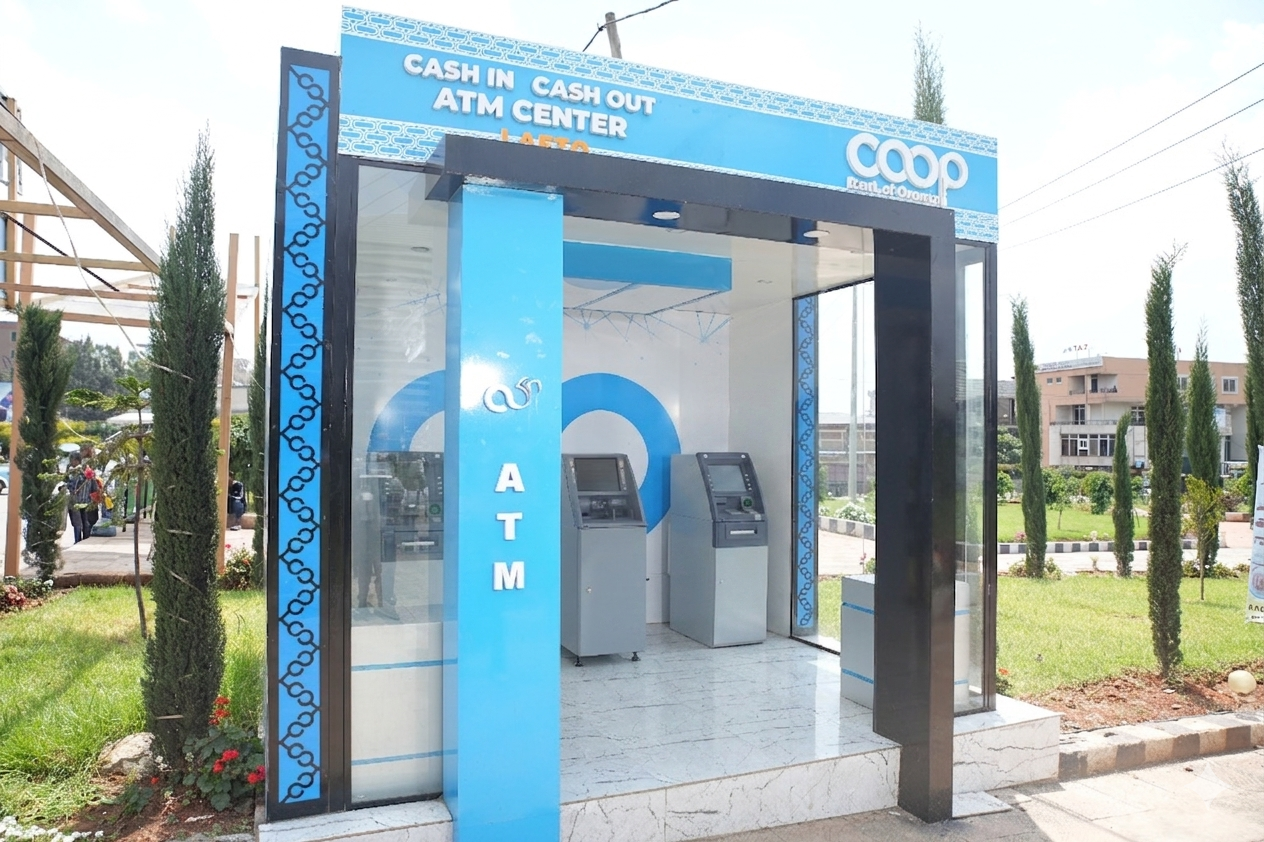
Coopbank ATM

Coopbank operates Eco Branches designed to provide banking services in rural areas while incorporating environmentally sustainable features. According to the bank's official website, more than 100 Eco Branches are currently in operation.

== Dx-Valley 2.0 ==
Dx-Valley 2.0 is a digital incubation center located in Addis Ababa, Ethiopia. It was established in June 2024 to support start-ups and early-stage businesses working on digital and technology-based solutions.The center provides a structured environment for entrepreneurs to develop ideas, access resources, and build scalable projects. Its activities include supporting innovation, encouraging entrepreneurship, and facilitating the development of digital services. Dx-Valley 2.0 operates as part of broader efforts to expand digital capacity and support the growth of technology-focused businesses in Ethiopia.

== Michu ==
Michu is a digital lending platform in Ethiopia that provides collateral-free loans to micro, small, and medium enterprises (MSMEs). It was launched in 2022 through a partnership between the Cooperative Bank of Oromia and Kifiya Financial Technology.

The platform enables users to apply for and receive loans through a fully digital process, using data-driven credit scoring to assess eligibility. It is designed to expand access to finance for businesses that do not meet traditional banking requirements.

Michu offers different loan products tailored to various business segments and supports financial inclusion by providing accessible funding to underserved entrepreneurs.

== Cash Recycler Machine (CRM) ==
A Cash Recycler Machine (CRM) is a self-service banking machine that allows users to both deposit and withdraw cash. It differs from traditional automated teller machines (ATMs) by reusing deposited cash for future withdrawals.

The Cooperative Bank of Oromia has deployed CRM units across Ethiopia as part of its digital banking services. These machines operate continuously, including outside regular banking hours, and are designed to function during power interruptions through built-in backup systems. CRMs improve cash management efficiency and expand access to banking services by reducing reliance on physical bank branches.

== See also ==
- List of banks in Ethiopia
