= Eder (finance) =

Social institution in Ethiopia

Eder or Idir (Amharic: እድር), is a social institution in Ethiopia used for mutual aid and grants cooperative insurance within specific community. It is an association that primarily assists people with self-help activities or infrastructure, and victims with bereavement such as funeral and other security issues in the community. Along with Equb, Edir is the traditional form of social institution in Ethiopia, despite varied by duration of time. Eder is distinguished from Equb that it is long-term association, whereas Equb can be temporary and permanent.

== Function ==
Eder enables community for mutual aid related to funeral and other community concerns. Eder is distinguished from Equb by duration of time where Eder is long-term association and Equb can be temporary or permanent, depending on the needs of members.

Eder is major form of indigenous arrangement utilized mainly for assisting victims in bereavement. These associations also give self-help activities and sometimes provide insurance in an informal manner. The association also raises funds and coordinates free labor of members in activities such as building roads, schools, health institutions and others. Another function of eder is safety insurance when the member of association encounters property (i.e. house) destruction and experiencing farming loss. It also compensates pensioned members who critically unable to pay contribution.

Eder was first developed by migrants to Addis Ababa in the early part of twentieth century, passed through the time of Italian occupation with increasing currency, formalization, diffusion and transformation from mono- to polyethnic voluntary organizations. Eder did not participate in developmental activities such as education and healthcare services or community development, fearing interference to state.
