= List of banks in Ethiopia =

This is a list of banks in Ethiopia, with summary data for the year 2023 (mostly June).

| | Bank Name | Web Site | Year Est. | No of Branches | SWIFT | SHF Equity (ETB m) | Net Profit (ETB m) |
|---|---|---|---|---|---|---|---|
| 1 | Nib International Bank | https://www.nibbanksc.com/ | 2003 | 410 | NIBIETTA | 9,973 | 1,507 |
| 2 | Abay Bank | http://www.abaybank.com.et/ | 2010 | 279 | ABAYETAA | 7,671 | 1,551 |
| 3 | Addis International Bank | http://www.addisbanksc.com/ | 2011 | 146 | ABSCETAA | 2,582 | 223 |
| 4 | Amhara Bank | https://www.amharabank.com.et/ | 2022 | 321 | AMHRETAA | | |
| 5 | Awash Bank | http://www.awashbank.com/ | 1994 | 875 | AWINETAA | 27,968 | 6,994 |
| 6 | Bank of Abyssinia | http://www.bankofabyssinia.com/ | 1996 | 913 | ABYSETAA | 19,475 | 3,873 |
| 7 | Berhan International Bank | http://berhanbanksc.com/ | 2009 | 46 | BERHETAA | 5,029 | 509 |
| 8 | Bunna International Bank | http://www.bunnabanksc.com/ | 2009 | 465 | BUNAETAA | | 949 |
| 9 | Commercial Bank of Ethiopia (State Bank) | https://www.combanketh.et/ | 1963 | 1444 | CBETETAA | 74,643 | 17,437 |
| 10 | Cooperative Bank of Oromia | https://coopbankoromia.com.et/ | 2005 | 467 | CBORETAA | 14,874 | 2,604 |
| 13 | Enat Bank | http://www.enatbanksc.com/ | 2013 | 174 | ENATETAA | 3,577 | 544 |
| 11 | Dashen Bank | http://www.dashenbanksc.com | 1995 | 835 | DASHETAA | 19,319 | 3,5 |
| 12 | Global Bank Ethiopia | https://www.globalbankethiopia.com/ | 2012 | 152 | DEGAETAA | 2,953 | 523 |
| 14 | Lion International Bank | http://www.anbesabank.com/ | 2006 | 278 | LIBSETAA | | 747 |
| 15 | Oromia International Bank | http://www.oromiabank.com/ | 2008 | 503 | ORIRETAA | 8,658 | (417) |
| 16 | Hibret Bank | https://www.hibretbank.com.et/ | 1998 | 473 | UNTDETAA | 9,372 | 2,298 |
| 17 | Wegagen Bank | https://www.wegagen.com/ | 1996 | | WEGAETAA | | |
| 18 | Zemen Bank | http://www.zemenbank.com/ | 2008 | 102 | ZEMEETAA | 8,480 | 1,813 |
| 19 | Development Bank of Ethiopia | http://www.dbe.com.et/ | 1901 | 32 | DBEETAA | 37,070 | 5,738 |
| 20 | ZamZam Bank | https://v2.zamzambank.com// | 2021 | 82 | ZAMZETAA | | 24 |
| 21 | Hijra Bank | https://www.hijra-bank.com/ | 2021 | 71 | HIJRETAA | 1,195 | 28 |
| 22 | Siinqee Bank | https://www.siinqeebank.com/ | 2021 | 466 | SINQETAA | 8,479 | 285 |
| 23 | Shabelle Bank | http://www.shabellebank.com/ | 2021 | 50 | SBEEETAA | 669 | 20 |
| 24 | Ahadu Bank | https://www.ahadubank.com/ | 2022 | 75 | AHUUETAA | 3,096 | (194) |
| 25 | Goh Betoch Bank SC | https://www.gohbetbank.com/ | 2021 | 9 | GOBTETAA | 1,545 | 5 |
| 26 | Tsedey Bank | https://tsedeybank-sc.com | 2022 | 560 | TSDYETAA | 12,320 | 1,055 |
| 27 | Gadaa Bank SC | https://gadaabank.com.et/ | 2022 | 60 | GDAAETAA | 808 | (84) |
| 29 | Amhara Bank | https://www.amharabank.com.et | 2021 | 320 | AMHRETAA | 5,879 | (170) |
| 30 | Rammis Bank | https://www.rammisbank.et/ | 2022 | 8 | RMSIETAA | 747 | |
