= Ethiopian Commercial Code =

The Ethiopian Commercial Code was introduced in 1960 during Haile Selassie regime. The regulation was revised by Proclamation No.1243/2021 in 2021, to address modernization issue in the commercial and business activities.

== History and background ==
The Ethiopian Commercial Code was formally introduced in 1960 under Emperor Haile Selassie regime to govern commercial activities in Ethiopia. The 1960 regulation seen major obstacle for any commercial activities and businesses in modern day. This is due to company's increasingly use of modern technology which has been incompatible to the older regulation.

In 2021, by Commercial Code Proclamation No. 1243/2021, the new law was enacted to address the modernizing issue.
