= Ethiopian birr =

Currency of Ethiopia

የኢትዮጵያ ብር (Amharic)
- Reverse of a 1 Ethiopian birr note, depicting the Tisisat waterfalls.

ISO 4217
- Code: ETB (numeric: 230)
- Subunit: 0.01

Units of account
- Symbol: Br (Latin Script) ብር (Ethiopic Script)
- Subunit
- 1/100: santim

Denominations
- Banknotes: 5, 10, 50, 100, 200 birr
- Coins: 1, 5, 10, 25, 50 santim; 1 birr

Demographics
- User(s): Ethiopia

Issuance
- Central bank: National Bank of Ethiopia
- Website: www.nbe.gov.et

Valuation
- Inflation: 15% October 2017
- Source: The World Factbook, 2008 est.

The birr (Amharic: ብር) is the primary unit of currency in Ethiopia. It is subdivided into 100 santims.

In 1931, Emperor Haile Selassie formally requested that the international community uses the name Ethiopia (as it had already been known internally for at least 1,600 years) instead of the exonym Abyssinia, and the issuing Bank of Abyssinia also became the Bank of Ethiopia. Thus, the pre-1931 currency may be referred to as the Abyssinian birr and the post-1931 currency the Ethiopian birr, although neither the country nor the currency changed beyond the name.

186 billion birr ($14.7 billion or €9.97 billion) were in circulation in 2008.

== History ==
=== First birr, 1855–1936 ===
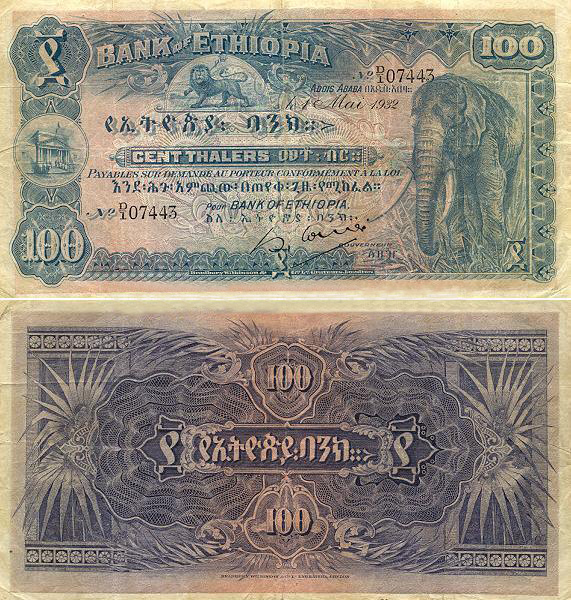
1932 birr

Although the Kingdom of Aksum issued copper, silver and gold coins, by the 18th and 19th century trade was facilitated by barter or the use of "primitive money", which included bolts of cloth, iron bars, beads, bracelets of gold, and cartridges. The most widely used medium of exchange was blocks of salt called amole tchew (አሞሌ), which were attested in circulation from their origins in the Danakil Depression to as far south as Lake Zway. Use of amole tchew is documented as late as 1911.

Between 1771 and 1805 the Maria Theresa thalers was accepted as a currency in Ethiopia, at first gradually and reluctantly. The thaler was known locally as the birr (literally 'silver' in Geʽez and Amharic) or talari (ታላሪ). The Maria Theresa thaler was officially adopted as the standard coin in 1855, although the Indian rupee and the Mexican dollar were also used in foreign trade. However, Rochet d'Héricourt reports that the larger part were hoarded and the few coins that remained in circulation mainly went to pay taxes to the local rulers.

As early as 1875, Menelik II, then king of Shewa, had considered issuing an Ethiopian currency. However, nothing substantial was done until the Treaty of Uccialli; an Additional Convention was negotiated by Ras Makonnen and signed on 1 October 1889 specifying that the Emperor of Ethiopia could issue a currency for his country and the coins would be struck in the King of Italy's mint. Deteriorating international relations with Italy -- leading to the First Italo-Abyssinian War -- prohibited much use of this agreement. Nonetheless, Menelik persevered in the creation of a national currency, and on 10 February 1893 issued a decree concerning a coinage, describing its design and specifying four denominations in silver and three in copper. The first coins were struck the following year, but in small quantities: only 20,000 dollars or birr were struck in 1894, and a mere 200 in 1896; no more than 51,200 coins of smaller denominations were issued. Richard Pankhurst concludes this issue "was little more than nominal", and a portion "was soon melted down for jewelry.".

A new Ethiopian coinage appeared following the Ethiopian victory in the Battle of Adowa. The new silver birr maintained the same weight and fineness as before, but the smaller denominations were reorganized: the silver half and quarter birr were kept and a silver gersh added (at first valued at 1/20 of a birr but later 1/16), while the only non-silver coin issued was a copper metonnya worth 1/100 of a birr. These were produced at the Paris Mint, which produced 815,000 birr in the first three years. By 1915 a total of 1,297,830 birr had been minted, and 19,494,308 of the smaller denominations. Despite the amount of coins issued, for the first years Menelik's currency struggled to compete with the existing use of Maria Theresa thalers. One observer noted that around 1900 the coins of Menelik circulated only in Addis Ababa and were little known beyond the capital; the first governor of the Bank of Abyssinia found that birr constituted 5% of the coins in the treasury. Pankhurst observes, "By the end of Menelik's reign the country was thus still a long way from possessing a truly national currency."

The Bank of Abyssinia was established in 1905 by Emperor Menelik and the European banking group behind the National Bank of Egypt; the bank was officially inaugurated by Menelik on 15 February 1906, with a branch in Harar. The Ethiopian coinage gained acceptance only gradually, and the Bank of Abyssinia imported Maria Theresa thalers. By the time World War I broke out, the bank was still importing about 1,200,000 of these coins annually. The Bank of Abyssinia put banknotes into circulation in 1915. These notes were denominated birr in Amharic and thaler in English. The notes did not circulate widely; one contemporary reports this paper money was not accepted at the customs office or at the post office, and were used by merchants and foreigners in the capital who found coins inconvenient for larger transactions.

Under Empress Zawditu only lesser denominations were issued, and only found acceptance in Shewa and parts of southern Ethiopia. With the advent of Haile Selassie, more paper money was issued in larger numbers than before, yet still failed to make headway in the countryside; one contemporary observed that on the eve of the Second Italo-Abyssinian War paper currency only circulated beyond the capital in Gondar and Harar. A new system of lesser currency minted from nickel and bronze was introduced 12 July 1933, but likewise was not accepted outside of the towns. Maria Theresa thalers remained the primary currency of rural areas. Only with the Italian occupation was the Austrian monopoly ended.

Emperor Haile Selassie bought out the Bank of Abyssinia in 1931 for £235,000 sterling in order to make it a purely Ethiopian institution. It was reorganized as the Bank of Ethiopia. At the same time, the currency was decimalized and token nickel and copper coins were introduced, the birr becoming equal to 100 metonnyas (often written matonas). The text on the banknotes appeared in Amharic, French, and English.

=== Italian lira, 1936–1941 ===
Not long after the Italian occupation and the attempted transformation of Ethiopia into Italian East Africa, the Italian lira was introduced on 15 July 1936 and Ethiopian banknotes were withdrawn from circulation at 3 lire per talari (birr). In an effort to increase the use of Italian paper money, the exchange rate for silver coins (Maria Theresa thalers) was raised to 4.50 lire, then to 5.00, and eventually, in stages, to 13.50. Still, many people kept their Ethiopian coins and banknotes.

Regular Italian coins and banknotes of Banca d'Italia circulated after 15 July 1936. Special notes with a red overprint were authorized for Italian East Africa on 12 September 1938, and a large quantity was printed. It is not clear, however, when, where, and to what extent these special notes actually circulated.

=== East African shilling, 1941–1945 ===
During the East African Campaign of 1941, British forces brought with them Indian, Egyptian, British, and British East African currency, and all were received in official payments. Italian coins and notes of up to 50 lire were allowed to continue in circulation to serve as small change; higher denominations were withdrawn at a rate of 24 lire per shilling (i.e., a half penny per lira). Maria Theresa thalers were allowed to circulate with a value of 1 shilling and 10 1/2 pence (or 45 lire). The East African shilling became the money of account on 1 July 1942; it eventually became the sole legal tender and remained so until 1945.

Regular notes of the East African Currency Board were used for circulation in Ethiopia.

=== Second birr, 1945–present ===
The birr was reintroduced on 23 July 1945 at a rate of 1 birr per 2 shillings. It was pegged to the U.S. dollar at a central rate of 1 birr = US$0.4025, or 2.48447 birr = US$1. On 31 December 1963, this was slightly changed to 2.50 birr = US$1 (an implied gold parity of 87.50 birr per troy ounce of fine gold).

The name Ethiopian dollar was used in the English text on the banknotes. It was divided into 100 santims (derived from the French centime). Birr became the official name, used in all languages, in 1976.

On 1 October 1992, the Transitional Government of Ethiopia devalued the birr from 2.07 to 5 per U.S. dollar as part of a reform away from the socialist system of the previous government.

==== 2024 birr floating ====
In 2024, Ethiopia undertook reforms, including the liberalization of its foreign exchange market, leading to the floating of the Ethiopian Birr. The National Bank of Ethiopia (NBE) spearheaded this initiative, receiving $13.5 billion from international partners to support the transition. This funding, primarily from multilateral lenders like the IMF and World Bank, aimed to the adoption of a flexible exchange rate system. Concurrently, Ethiopia secured over $15 billion in financial support from the World Bank, including direct grants, debt extensions, and investment commitments. The Ethiopian Birr experienced a substantial decline, falling 63% against the US dollar within a week of floating. The government's introduction of a floating exchange rate led to a volatile period, with the Commercial Bank of Ethiopia and private banks rapidly adjusting their foreign exchange rates. The exchange rate as indicated by the Commercial Bank of Ethiopia (CBE) is plummeted from 57 birr per US dollar a week ago to the 106 birr per dollar.

==== Proposed birr symbol ====
There have been various proposals for a birr symbol, mostly based on the Geʽez fidel ብ (bə). One suggested symbol comprises the bə with two horizontal slashes on the left hand side.

== Coins ==
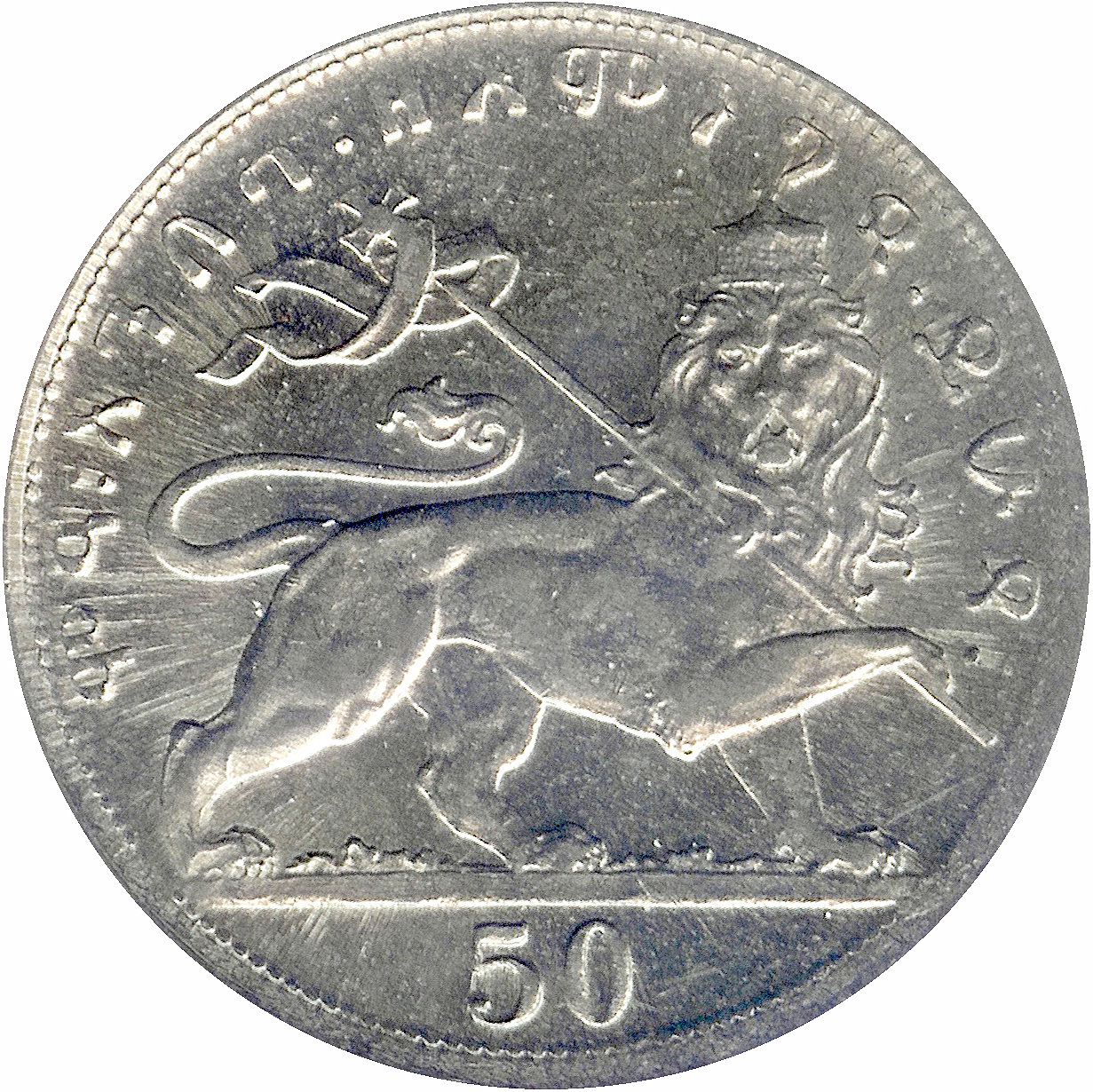
Reverse of a 50 metonnyas coin from 1931 (EE1923)

=== First birr ===
Between 1894 and 1897 copper coins were introduced in denominations of 1/100 and 1/32 birr, together with silver 1 ghersh, 1/8, 1/4, 1/2 and 1 birr, and gold 1/4, 1/2 and 1 werk. In 1931, a new series of coins was introduced consisting of copper 1 and 5 metonnyas, and nickel 10, 20 and 50 metonnyas.

=== Second birr ===
In 1944 (EE1936 in the Ethiopian calendar), coins were reintroduced, with copper 1, 5, 10 and 25 santim and silver 50 santim coins. A second series was issued in 1977 (EE1969). It consisted of aluminium 1 santim, brass 5 and 10 santim, cupro-nickel 25 and 50 santim, and bi-metallic 1 birr coins. The most recent issues are:

- 5 santim 2006 (EE1998)
- 10 santim 2004 (EE1996)
- 25 santim 2016 (EE2008; also called semuni)
- 50 santim 2016 (EE2008)
- 1 birr 2016 (EE2008)

The dates, like the rest of the legend, appear in Amharic, the official language of Ethiopia.

=== Identification and appearance ===
Besides having almost all text in Amharic, there are two features that help to immediately identify an Ethiopian birr. Coins dated before 1977 (EE1969) feature the Conquering Lion of Judah (a crowned rampant lion holding a cross). This can be seen in the adjacent picture. Coins dated 1977 (EE1969) or later picture the head of a roaring lion, with a flowing mane.

Coins were struck at several mints, including Paris, Berlin, and Addis Ababa. Coins without mint marks were generally struck at Addis Ababa. The coins struck at Paris have either the mintmark "A" with the cornucopia and fasces privy marks, or the cornucopia and torch privy marks without the "A".

== Banknotes ==
=== First birr ===
The Bank of Abyssinia introduced banknotes for 5, 10, 100 and 500 birr in 1915, and 280,000 birr worth of notes were printed. How many of these notes were in circulation is debated: Pankhurst cites one source claiming that by 1921 only 214,765 birr were in circulation, while another reports 1,740,000 birr in paper money had been issued. The text on the notes was in Amharic and French. A 50-talari note was added in 1929.

The Bank of Ethiopia issued notes in 1932 in denominations of 5, 10, 50, 100 and 500 talaris. A 2-talari note dated 1 June 1933 was issued in honour of the Imperial couple. By the end of 1934, some 3.3 million birr in notes were circulating.

=== Second birr ===
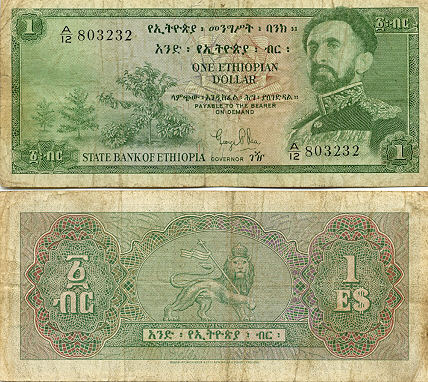
1961 birr

On 23 July 1945, notes were introduced by the Bank of Ethiopia in denominations of 1, 5, 10, 50, 100 and 500 birrs. The National Bank of Ethiopia was established by imperial proclamation 207 of 27 July 1963, and began operation on 1 January 1964. The National Bank of Ethiopia took over note production in 1966 and issued all denominations except for the 500 birr.

Banknotes have been issued in the following series:

=== 2020 denominations ===
On 14 September 2020, Ethiopia announced the introduction of new banknotes of 10, 50, 100, and 200 birrs, with the latter being issued as a high denomination note to tackle inflation. Older issues of 10, 50, and 100 birr notes were demonetized in December. The federal government reported that over 113 billion birrs ($3.6 billion) remain hidden from the banks. The federal government also believes this money is being used as a catalyst to the current instability in Ethiopia. In just a month, Ethiopian banks took in 14 billion birrs (around $500 million) into their system, which is expected to increase towards the end of 2020. The measure, announced by Prime Minister Abiy Ahmed, was reported as a preventative measure against hoarding, counterfeiting and other corruption affecting the economy. He also noted that the country spent 3.7 billion birrs ($101.2 million) to print the new banknotes. Companies and individuals can only cash up to 1.5 million birrs ($41,000). The cash withdrawal from banks should also not exceed 100,000 birrs ($2,737). The old 5-birr notes, while they will remain legal tender, will be replaced with a coin.

=== Summary ===
Series	Denominations
1945	1, 5, 10, 50, 100 and 500 birr
1961	1, 5, 10, 20, 50, 100 and 500 birr
1966	1, 5, 10, 50 and 100 birr
1976	1, 5, 10, 50 and 100 birr
1991	1, 5, 10, 50 and 100 birr
1997	1, 5, 10, 50 and 100 birr
2003	1, 5, 10, 50 and 100 birr
2004	50, 100 birr
2006	1, 5, 10, 50 and 100 birr
2020	10, 50, 100 and 200 birr

Banknotes of the Ethiopian birr (2006 version)
Value	Obverse	Reverse
1 birr	Young boy	Tisisat waterfalls (Blue Nile)
5 birr	Coffee harvest	Kudu and lynx
10 birr	Basket weaver	Tractor
50 birr	Plowing	Enqulal Gemb fortress (Gondar)
100 birr	Plowing	Man, microscope

Banknotes of the Ethiopian birr (2020 version)
Obverse	Reverse	Value	Obverse	Reverse
		10 birr	Camel, coffee harvest	Two couples
		50 birr	Tractor	Factory
		100 birr	Enqulal Gemb fortress (Gondar)	Sof Omar caves; City gate, Harar
		200 birr	Pigeon	Capricorn

Ethiopian birr per US$, 2005–2009
Year	Lowest ↓		Highest ↑		Average
Year	Date	Rate	Date	Rate	Rate
2005	25 Apr	8.0117	30 Oct	8.4240	8.3100
2006	12 Jun	8.3940	7 Sep	9.1739	8.7510
2007	12 Feb	9.0670	19 Oct	9.6085	9.3921
2008	17 Apr	9.6715	1 Dec	10.7701	9.9167
2009	14 Jul	11.0763	15 Mar	12.9891	

Current /currency/USD exchange rates
From Google Finance:	AUD CAD CHF CNY EUR GBP HKD JPY USD blackmarketet.com
From Yahoo! Finance:	AUD CAD CHF CNY EUR GBP HKD JPY USD blackmarketet.com
From XE.com:	AUD CAD CHF CNY EUR GBP HKD JPY USD blackmarketet.com
From OANDA:	AUD CAD CHF CNY EUR GBP HKD JPY USD blackmarketet.com

== See also ==
- Economy of Ethiopia

Ethiopian birr (thaler)
Preceded by: Maria Theresa thaler Ratio: at par	Currency of Ethiopia; 1894 – 1936	Succeeded by: Italian lira Reason: annexed by Italy into Italian East Africa; Ratio: 5 lire = 1 birr

Ethiopian birr (dollar)
Preceded by: East African shilling Reason: end of British occupation Ratio: 1 birr = 2 shillings	Currency of Ethiopia; 1945 – Note: English translation was "dollar" before 1976		Succeeded by: Current
Preceded by: East African shilling Reason: end of British occupation Ratio: 1 birr = 2 shillings	Currency of Eritrea (as part of Ethiopia); 1952 – 1993; Note: Eritrea became part of a federation with Ethiopia in 1952. Eritrea became a fully integrated part of Ethiopia in 1960	Currency of Eritrea; 1993 – 1997	Succeeded by: Eritrean nakfa Reason: currency independence Ratio: at par
