= List of companies based in Eritrea =

Location of Eritrea

Eritrea, officially the State of Eritrea, is a country in the Horn of Africa. The economy of Eritrea has experienced considerable growth in recent years, indicated by an improvement in Gross domestic product (GDP) in October 2012 of 7.5 percent over 2011. However, worker remittances from abroad are estimated to account for 32 percent of gross domestic product. Eritrea has an extensive amount of resources such as copper, gold, granite, marble, and potash. The Eritrean economy has undergone extreme changes due to the War of Independence. In 2011, Eritrea's GDP grew by 8.7 percent, making it one of the fastest-growing economies in the world. The Economist Intelligence Unit (EIU) expects it to maintain a high growth rate of 8.5 percent in 2013.

== Companies based in Eritrea ==
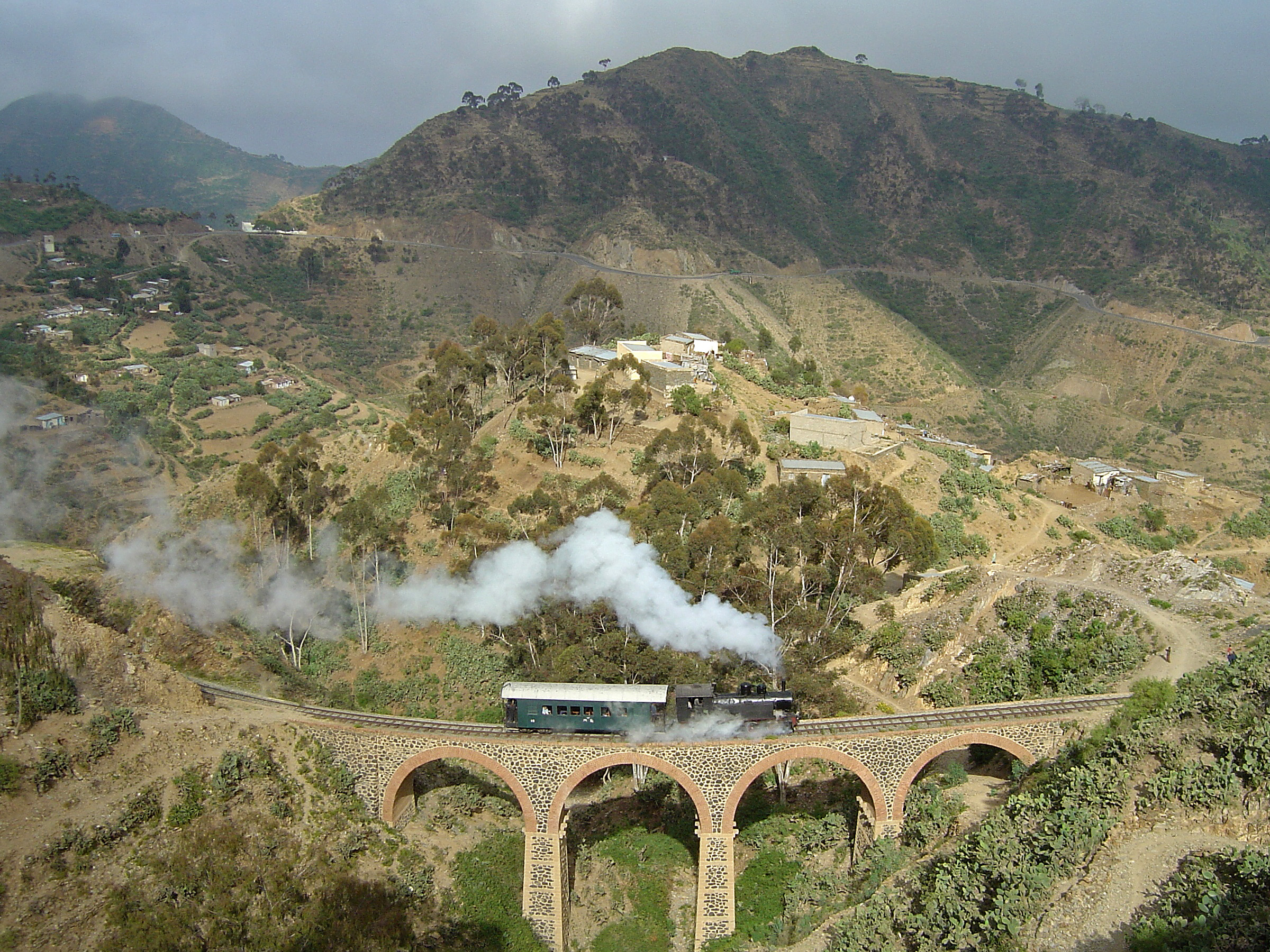
Eritrean Railway, that now connects only Massawa and Asmara, showing a class 440 locomotive at work on the mountainous section between Arbaroba and Asmar

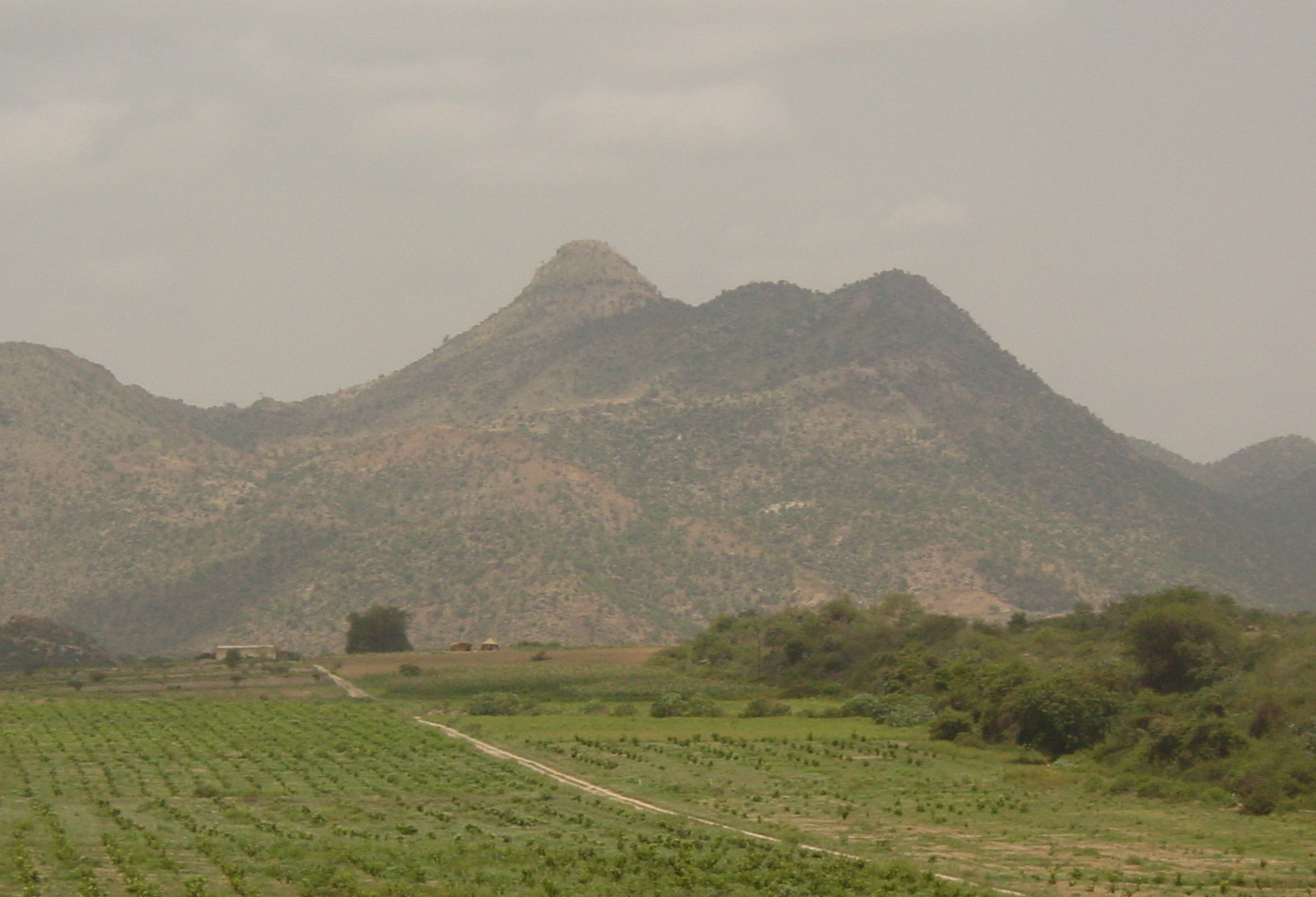
Grove of citrus trees at the Elabored Estate in Elabored, Eritrea

- Asmara Brewery
- Banca per l'Africa Orientale
- Commercial Bank of Eritrea
- Elabored Estate
- Eritrean Investment and Development Bank
- Eritrean Railway
- Eritrean Telecommunications Corporation
- Housing and Commerce Bank
- Nakfa Corporation
- Red Sea Trading Corporation
- Sabur Printing Press
Corporate office for the Red Sea Trading Corporation in downtown Asmara, Eritrea

== By type ==
New headquarters for the Housing and Commerce Bank of Eritrea in Asmara, Eritrea

=== Airlines ===
- Eritrean Airlines
- Nasair (defunct)
- Red Sea Air (defunct)
