= List of banks in Eritrea =

This is a list of commercial banks in Eritrea, as reported in 2021.

== List of commercial banks ==
- Commercial Bank of Eritrea, state-owned
- Eritrean Investment and Development Bank, state-owned
- Housing and Commerce Bank, owned by the People's Front for Democracy and Justice

== See also ==
- Bank of Eritrea
- Banking in Eritrea
- List of banks in Africa
- List of companies based in Eritrea
