= Economy of Eritrea =

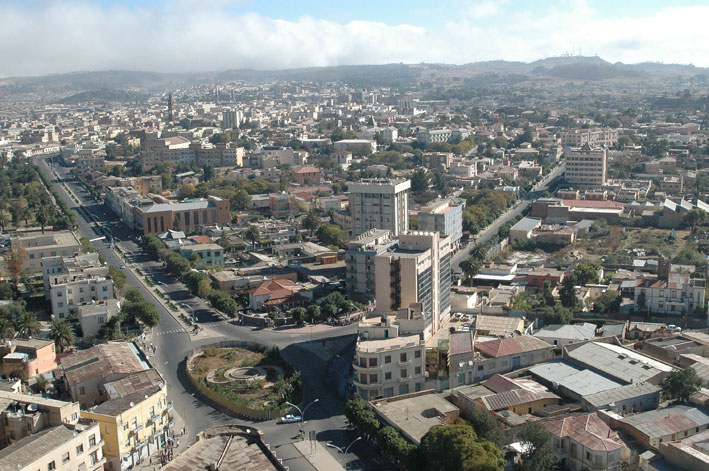
- Asmara is economic centre of Eritrea
- Currency: Eritrean nakfa (ERN)
- Fiscal year: Calendar year
- Trade organisations: AU, COMESA, AfDB

Statistics
- GDP: ▼$2.22 billion (nominal, 2021); ▲$6.88 billion (PPP, 2021)
- GDP rank: 156th (nominal); 156th (PPP)
- GDP growth: ▲7.9% (2019f); 7.9% (2020f)
- GDP per capita: ▲$626 (nominal, 2021); ▲$1,910 (PPP, 2021)
- GDP by sector: agriculture (11.7%), industry (29.6%), services (58.7%) (2017)
- Inflation (CPI): −14.401% (2018)
- Population below national poverty line: 50% (2004)
- Labour force: 2.71 million (2017)
- Labour force by occupation: agriculture (80%), services and industry (20%)
- Main industries: beverages, cement, clothing and textiles, food processing, light manufacturing, salt

External
- Exports: $635.7 million (2017)
- Export goods: food, livestock, small manufactures, sorghum, textiles
- Main export partners: China 67%; UAE 25.9% (2023)
- Imports: $1.127 billion (2017)
- Import goods: machinery, petroleum products, food, manufactured goods
- Main import partners: China 31.6%; UAE 27.2%; Turkey 8.94%; United States 6.93% (2023)
- Gross external debt: $1.026 billion (2012)

Public finance
- Government debt: 131.2% of GDP (2017)
- Foreign reserves: $236.7 million (2017)
- Revenue: $2.029 billion (2017)
- Spending: $2.601 billion (2017)
- All values, unless otherwise stated, are in US dollars.

Eritrea has a developing economy. It relies on subsistence agriculture, rainfed farming, livestock, and fisheries; about 70% of the population lives in rural areas. The economy is tightly controlled, and all significant enterprises are state-owned. Eritrea has one of the highest debt-to-GDP ratios in the world. In 2024, the World Bank estimated Eritrea's public debt at 211% of GDP.

The Eritrean economy has undergone extreme changes after the War of Independence. It experienced considerable growth in recent years, indicated by an improvement in gross domestic product in 2011 of 8.7 % and in 2012 of 7.5% over 2011, and has a total of $8.090 billion as of 2020. Worker remittances from abroad are estimated to account for 32% of the gross domestic product.

== Economic history ==
Eritrea's recent economic growth has been characterised by considerable volatility, partly due to its dependence on predominantly rainfed agriculture, which accounts for about one-third of the economy. The sector is also affected by distribution services, which account for about 20 per cent of GDP, and mining, which accounts for another 20 per cent of the economy. Real GDP growth is estimated to have recovered to around 12% in 2018, after an average contraction of -2.7% between 2015 and 2018, caused by frequent droughts and lower mining output.

Reported inflation in Eritrea was negative between 2016 and 2018, following the exchange of currency in circulation in November 2015, which led to a contraction in the money supply. Deflation persisted in 2018, as increased trade with Ethiopia exerted additional downward pressure on prices.

In recent years, Eritrea has pursued a tighter fiscal policy to address persistent deficits that emerged after the intensification of regional instability in 1998. By 2018, the country recorded a fiscal surplus of about 11 % of GDP, mainly due to significant reductions in capital expenditures and the introduction of some revenue-raising measures. However, current fiscal pressures, including recurrent and labour-related expenditures, are expected to increase.

Short-term growth prospects remain challenging due to fiscal constraints and limited opportunities under existing restrictions. The recovery in the agricultural sector is expected to slow. Eritrea continues to face a difficult macroeconomic environment, characterized by an unsustainable debt burden—including arrears to the World Bank—as well as vulnerabilities in the financial and external sectors.

== Macroeconomic trend ==
=== Main indicators ===
The following table shows the main economic indicators in 1995-2019 (the last year available). Inflation below 5% is in green.

| Year | GDP | | | GDP growth (real) | Inflation | Government debt (% of GDP) |
| Year | Total (bil. US$ PPP) | Per capita (US$ PPP) | Total (bil. US$ nominal) | GDP growth (real) | Inflation | Government debt (% of GDP) |
|---|---|---|---|---|---|---|
| 1995 | 2.6 | 1166 | 0.5 | ▲2.3 | ▲12.0 | n/a |
| 2000 | ▲2.9 | ▲1284 | 0.5 | ▼ -12.4 | ▲19.9 | ▲219.1 |
| 2005 | ▲3.7 | ▲1325 | ▲0.9 | ▲2.6 | ▲12.5 | ▼205.4 |
| 2006 | ▲3.8 | ▼1310 | 0.9 | ▼ -1 | ▲7.7 | ▼199 |
| 2007 | ▲4.0 | ▲1329 | ▲1.0 | ▲1.4 | ▲9.4 | ▲201.3 |
| 2008 | ▼3.3 | ▼1068 | ▼0.9 | ▼ -19.4 | ▲22.2 | ▲259.7 |
| 2009 | ▲3.7 | ▲1183 | ▲1.3 | ▲12.2 | ▲33.9 | ▼207.1 |
| 2010 | ▲4.1 | ▲1306 | ▲1.6 | ▲10.9 | ▲10.3 | ▼201.8 |
| 2011 | ▲5.3 | ▲1653 | ▲2.1 | ▲25.7 | ▲5.9 | ▼171.6 |
| 2012 | ▲5.5 | ▲1697 | ▲2.3 | ▲1.9 | ▲6.0 | 171.6 |
| 2013 | ▼5.0 | ▼1531 | ▼2.0 | ▼ -10.5 | ▲6.3 | ▲232.4 |
| 2014 | ▲6.7 | ▲2021 | ▲2.6 | ▲30.9 | ▲8.4 | ▼204.5 |
| 2015 | ▼5.4 | ▼1603 | ▼2.0 | ▼ -20.6 | ▲28.5 | ▲271.4 |
| 2016 | ▲5.8 | ▲1721 | ▲2.2 | ▲7.4 | ▲ -5.6 | ▼251.2 |
| 2017 | ▼5.3 | ▼1559 | ▼1.9 | ▼ -10 | ▲ -13.3 | ▲290.4 |
| 2018 | ▲6.1 | ▲1765 | ▲2.0 | ▲13 | ▲ -14.4 | ▼267.1 |
| 2019 | ▲6.4 | ▲1821 | 2.0 | ▲3.8 | ▲1.3 | ▼260.4 |

== Industries ==
=== Agriculture, Forestry, and Fishing ===
In 2004, agriculture employed nearly 80 % of the population but accounted for only 12.4 % of gross domestic product (GDP) in Eritrea. The agricultural sector has improved with the use of modern farming equipment and techniques, and dams. Nevertheless, it is compromised by a lack of financial services and investment. Major agricultural products are sorghum, barley, beans, dairy products, lentils, meat, millet, leather, teff, and wheat. The displacement of 1 million Eritreans as a result of the war with Ethiopia, and the widespread presence of land mines have played a role in the declining productivity of the agricultural sector. Almost a quarter of the country's most productive land remains unoccupied because of the lingering effects of the 1998–2000 war with Ethiopia.

Forestry is not a significant economic activity in Eritrea.

As of 2011, the government encouraged large-scale cultivation of cactus to help alleviate the human suffering and, in the future, increase export revenues. Cactus plants are said to have been introduced in 1839 by a French Catholic missionary who planted the cactus in Digsa, Akrur and Hebo, Southern region. The second generation of cactus plants were introduced by the Italians, who planted them at Arberebu while they were building the Asmara rail lines.

Reliable figures on the extent and value of the fishing industry in Eritrea are difficult to obtain. However, Eritrea's long coastline offers the opportunity for significant expansion of the fishing industry from its current, largely artisanal, stage. Eritrea exports fish and sea cucumbers from the Red Sea to markets in Europe and Asia, and there is hope that the construction of a new, jet-capable airport in Massawa, as well as rehabilitation of the port there, may support increased exports of high-value seafood. In 2002, exports were about 14,000 tons, but the maximum stable yield is thought to be nearly 80,000 tons. A fish processing plant was built in 1998 that now exports 150 tons of frozen fish every month to markets in Britain, Germany, and the Netherlands. Tensions with Yemen over fishing rights in the Red Sea flared up in 1995 and again in 2002, and Eritrea's difficult relations with other nations could hamper further development of the industry.

=== Mining and minerals ===
As of 2001, Eritrea's substantial mineral deposits were largely unexplored. According to the Eritrean government, artisanal mining in 1998 collected 573.4 kilograms of gold, however the number of gold reserves was unknown. International observers also have noted Eritrea's potential for quarrying ornamental marble and granite. As of 2001, some 10 mining companies had obtained licenses to prospect for different minerals in Eritrea. The government of Eritrea reportedly was in the process of conducting a geological survey for use by potential investors in the mining sector. The presence of hundreds of thousands of land mines in Eritrea, particularly along the border with Ethiopia, has presented a serious impediment to future development of the mining sector.

In 2011, AngloGold Ashanti moved into Eritrea to explore the Arabian-Nubian Shield for gold through a 50/50 joint venture set up in 2009 with Thani Dubai Mining.

In 2011, the Australian Chalice mining company applied through a 60/40 joint venture for a mining license for 18 years.

Also in 2011, Nevsun Resources completed construction of its Bisha gold mining project. Estimated production was to be 350,000 ounces of gold per year until the gold ore is exhausted, at which point the mine would produce copper and zinc.

As of 2012, nine explorer companies operated in Eritrea from Canada (NGEx Resources), Australia (Chalice Gold Mines, South Boulder Mines, Sunridge Gold Corp), China (Sichuan Road and Bridge Group, Zhong Chang Mining Co, China Africa Huakan Investment Co., Land Energy Group (China) Ltd, Beijing Donia Resources Co.), the UK (London Africa Ltd, Andiamo Exploration Ltd.), the UAE and Barbados.

=== Industry and Manufacturing ===
During the period of federation, industrial capacity largely shifted to Ethiopia, leaving the Eritrean industrial sector with outmoded capital equipment. In 2003 industry accounted for 25.3 % of gross domestic product. Major products include processed food and dairy products, alcoholic beverages, glass, leather goods, marble, textiles, and salt.

=== Energy ===
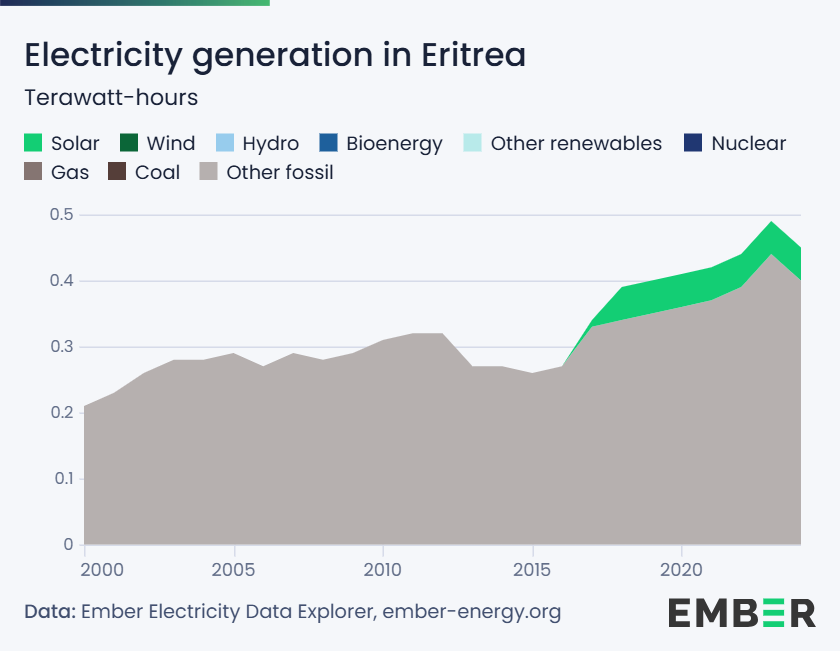
Electricity generation in Eritrea in terawatt-hours

Households consume more than 80 % of total energy production. Electricity production in 2001 was estimated at 220.5 million kilowatt-hours. Consumption for that year was estimated at 205.1-kilowatt hours. An 88-megawatt electricity plant funded by Saudi Arabia, Kuwait, and Abu Dhabi was completed just south of Massawa in 2003, its completion delayed nearly three years by the war with Ethiopia. Annual consumption of petroleum in 2001 was estimated at 370,000 tons. Eritrea has no domestic petroleum production; the Eritrean Petroleum Corporation conducts purchases through international competitive tender. According to the U.S. Department of Commerce, opportunities exist for both on- and offshore oil and natural gas exploration; however, these prospects have yet to come to fruition. The use of wind energy and solar power have slightly increased, due to the growth of solar power manufacturing companies in the country. The Eritrean government has expressed interest in developing alternative energy sources, including geothermal, solar, and wind power.

=== Services ===
In 2011, services accounted for 55 % of gross domestic product. Financial services, the bulk of the services sector, are principally rendered by the National Bank of Eritrea (the nation's central bank), the Commercial Bank of Eritrea, the Housing and Commerce Bank of Eritrea, the Agricultural and Industrial Bank of Eritrea, the Eritrean Investment and Development Bank, and the National Insurance Corporation of Eritrea.

=== Tourism ===
Eritrea's lack of access to funds, the presence of large numbers of land mines, and the continued tensions that flare up between Eritrea and Ethiopia have deterred the development of a tourist industry in Eritrea. According to the World Tourism Organization, international tourism receipts in 2002 were only US$73 million.

=== Banking and Finance ===
According to the International Monetary Fund, commercial banks in Eritrea—all government owned and operated—appear to be in compliance with prudent regulations. Although the commercial banking sector is largely profitable, mostly owing to income from foreign exchange transactions, the sector is burdened by a high proportion of non-performing loans. Core lending activities do not generate sufficient income to cover operating costs at most commercial banks.

== Currency, exchange rate, and inflation ==
The official currency is the Eritrean nakfa (ERN), introduced in November 1997. In early 2005, likely in an effort to increase foreign capital reserves, the Eritrean government decreed that all transactions in Eritrea must be conducted in nakfa. It soon became illegal for individuals to hold and exchange foreign currency. As of January 1, 2005, the government set the foreign exchange rate at US$1=ERN15.

Inflation continues to be a problem in Eritrea, particularly as years of drought push grain prices higher and defense expenditures remain high. The International Monetary Fund estimates that in 2003 (the most recent year for which figures are available) average inflation reached 23 %.

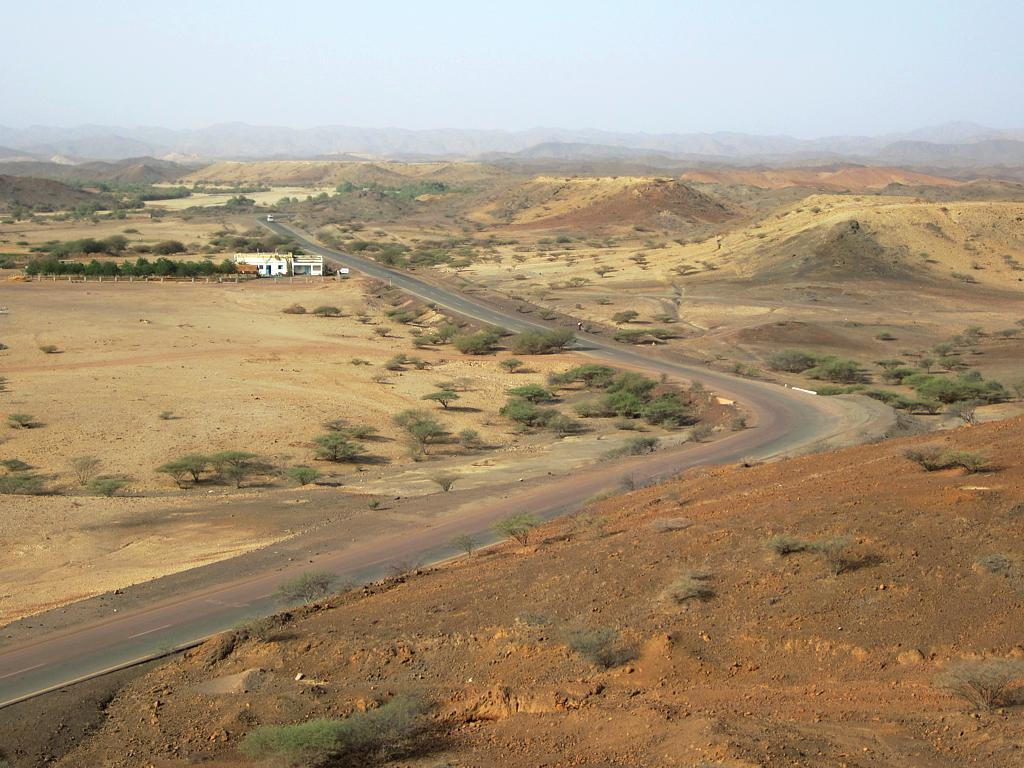
The Massawa-Asmara Highway, built as part of the Wefri Warsay Yika'alo program.

== Government budget ==
Eritrea does not publish a budget, making its fiscal condition difficult to assess. According to the International Monetary Fund, the overall fiscal deficit in 2003 was 17 % of gross domestic product (GDP). Government expenditures for that year were estimated to be US$375 million, with revenues of only US$235.7 million. In 2002 the fiscal deficit was 32 % of GDP. Current expenditures continue to exceed budgeted spending, particularly in defense and other discretionary expenditures. Monetary policy remains subservient to the financing demands of the government, and debt is unsustainably high. This situation is not likely to change until demobilization of the military occurs. According to the CIA World Factbook, the Eritrean Government has revenues of $715.2 million, and outlays of $1.021 billion.

== Foreign economic relations ==
China, India, South Korea, Italy, South Africa, and Germany are aggressively pursuing market opportunities in Eritrea. There is growing interest in U.S. products and services in Eritrea, although U.S. investment in Eritrea is still small.

In 2011, Eritrea imported goods worth US$899.9 million, including machinery, petroleum products, food, and manufactured goods. Eritrea's main suppliers were Brazil, China, Egypt, India, Italy, Germany, Saudi Arabia, and South Africa. In 2011 exports from Eritrea were valued at US$415.4 million, and the bulk were food, livestock, small manufactures, sorghum, and textiles. The major markets for Eritrean goods were China, Egypt, Italy, Saudi Arabia, Sudan, and the UK. More recently, fish, flowers, and salt have joined the list of exports.

Foreign investment is hindered by government regulations that seek to protect domestic industries from foreign competition and by a generally unfavorable investment climate. Major foreign investors in Eritrea include China, South Korea, Italy, South Africa, and Germany, as well as the World Bank.

The government prefers private-sector investment to official aid programs and declines foreign aid; therefore its relations with aid-dispensing nations and international institutions have often been difficult.

On 16 September 2018, Eritrean President Isaias Afwerki and Ethiopian Prime Minister Abiy Ahmed signed a peace agreement in Jeddah, Saudi Arabia between the two countries after a bitter war that lasted 20 years (from 1998 to 2018). The two neighbouring countries ceased hostilities and restored trade and diplomatic ties, and planned joint projects.

== See also ==
- Eritrea
- Banking in Eritrea
- List of companies based in Eritrea
- United Nations Economic Commission for Africa
