= Red Sea (disambiguation) =

The Red Sea is a body of water between Africa and Asia, and part of the Indian Ocean. It may also refer to:

== Government and politics ==
- Northern Red Sea Region, an administrative region of Eritrea, adjacent to the Red Sea
- Red Sea (state), a state of Sudan, adjacent to the Red Sea
- Red Sea Governorate, a governorate of Egypt, adjacent to the Red Sea
- Red sea (United States), states that consistently vote red (i.e., for the Republican Party)
- Southern Red Sea Region, an administrative region of Eritrea, adjacent to the Red Sea

== Music ==
- Dead Cities, Red Seas & Lost Ghosts, a 2003 album by M83
- The Red Sea (EP), a 1999 EP by the band Isis
- Red Sea (Augustus Pablo album), 1998
- Red Sea (Warhorse album), 1972
- Red Sea, a Christian band formed in 1994 (see Die Happy)
- Red sea, a song by American shoegazing band Asobi Seksu

== Others ==
- Red Sea FC, an Eritrean football club based in Asmara
- The Red Sea, a nickname for Arrowhead Stadium
- The Red Sea Project
- Red Sea Trading Corporation, a company in Eritrea
- Air Djibouti, also known as Red Sea Airlines
- Red Sea, the file system from biblical themed operating system TempleOS
- Red Sea (football), the fanbase of the Arizona Cardinals

== See also ==
- RED C, Irish market research and opinion polling company
- Reed Sea, a lake which formerly existed close to the Gulf of Aqaba, but vanished due to the installation of the Suez Canal
- Red tide, an algal bloom which turns water red or brown
- Yam Suph, the body of water traditionally translated as Red Sea in the book of Exodus
