= Banca Italiana di Sconto =

Former Italian bank

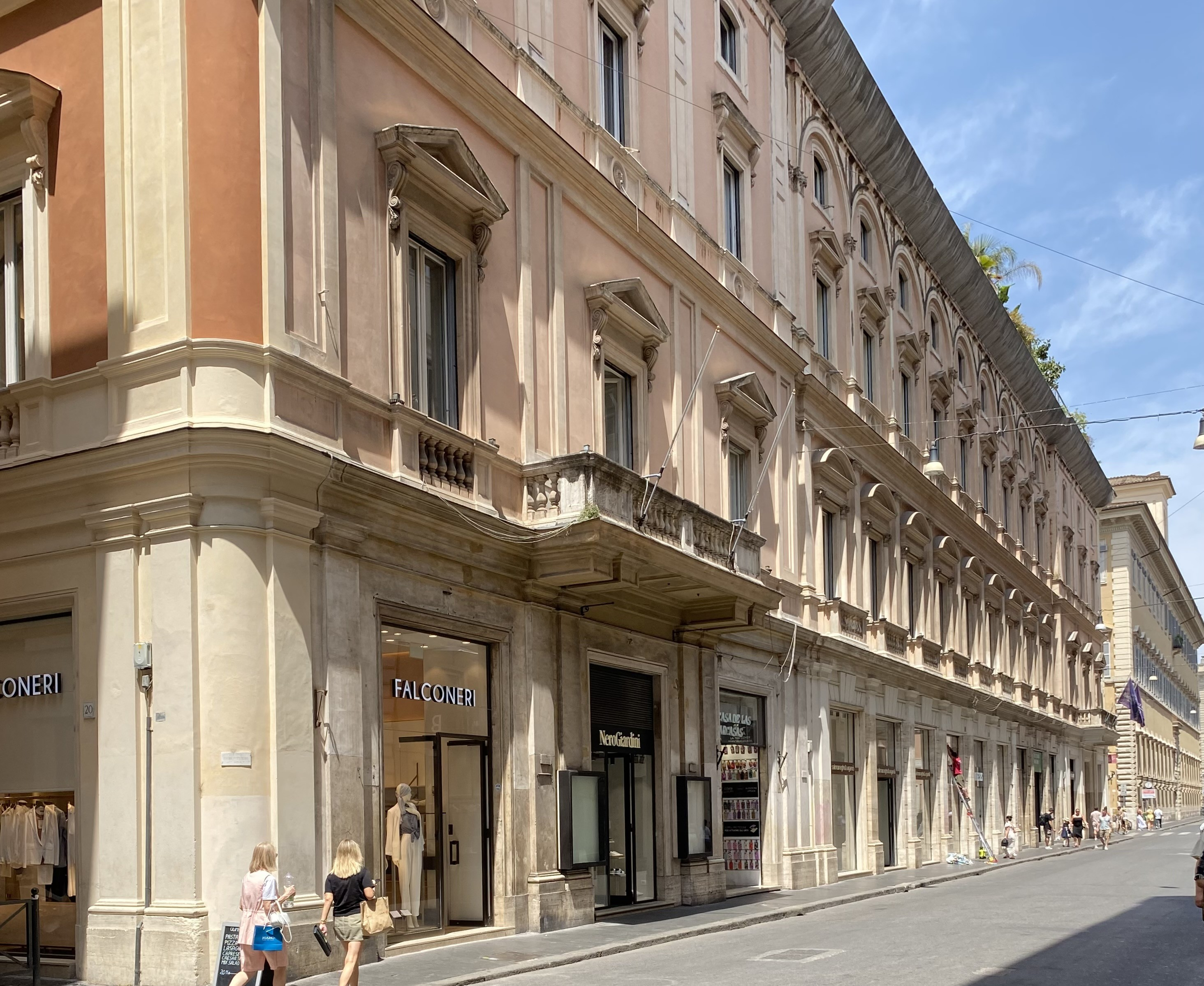
Former head office of Banca Italiana di Sconto, Via del Corso in Rome

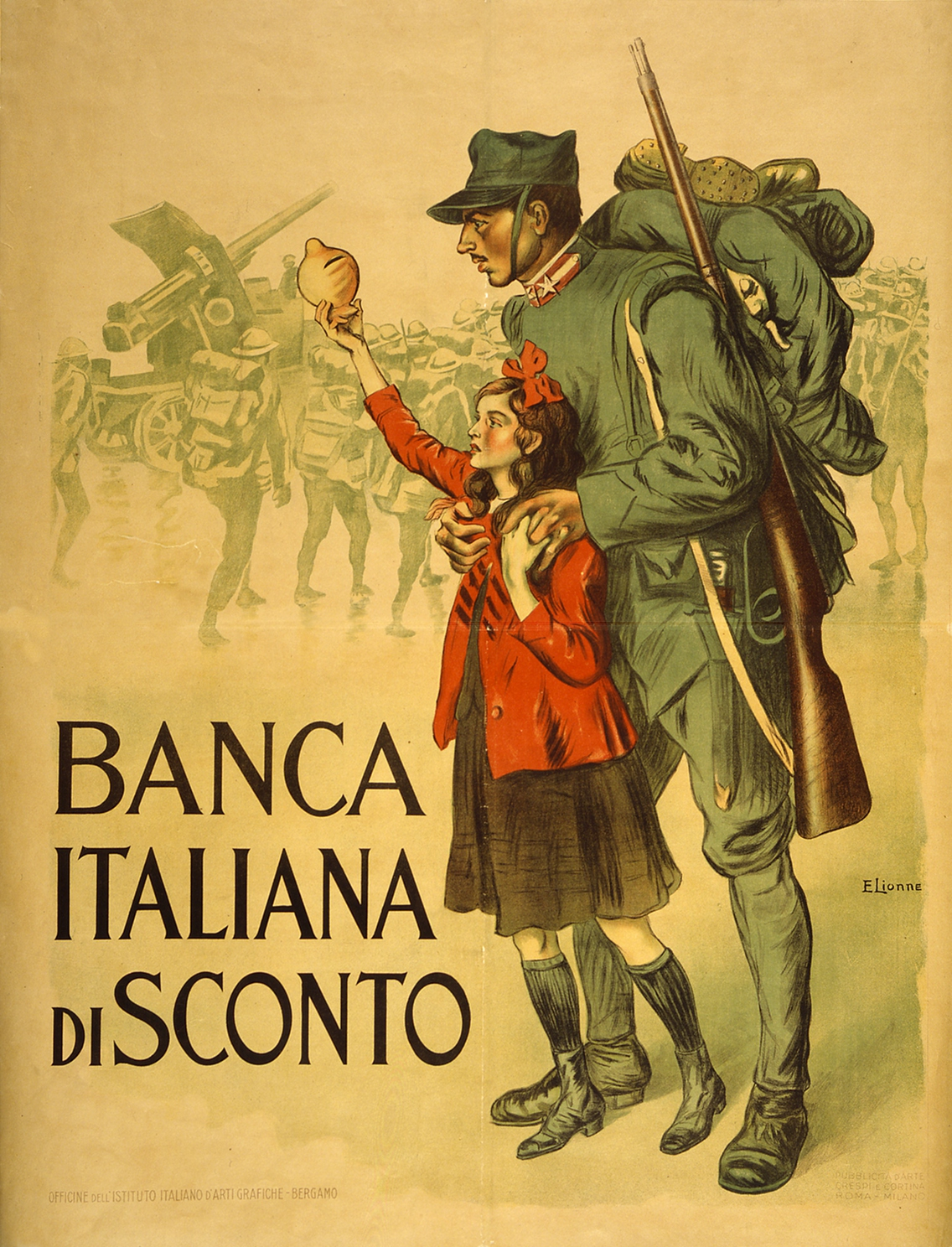
1917 war advert of the Banca Italiana di Sconto

The Banca Italiana di Sconto (BIS, lit. 'Italian Discount Bank') was the third-largest Italian bank in its time, headquartered in Rome and formed in 1915 by merger of Società Bancaria Italiana with Società Italiana di Credito Provinciale. It went bankrupt in 1921.

== Overview ==
The BIS was headquartered in Rome in the building on Via del Corso 412–416, with entrances on Via in Lucina and Piazza in Lucina.

In early 1922, a new bank, the Banca Nazionale di Credito, was formed to manage the BIS liquidation process.

The BIS had financed the giant film production conglomerate Unione Cinematografica Italiana (UCI). In 1917, it sponsored the Banca per l'Africa Orientale (BAO), based in Rome and intended to support Italy's colonial ambitions. Following the BIS's failure, UCI in turn failed in 1922, and BAO in 1923.

== See also ==
- Banco di Roma
- List of banks in Italy

== Bibliography ==
- Moliterno, Gino (2009). Historical Dictionary of Italian Cinema. Scarecrow Press.
- Toninelli, Pierangelo Maria. The Rise and Fall of State-Owned Enterprise in the Western World. Cambridge University Press, 2000.
