= Housing and Commerce Bank =

Bank in Asmara, Eritrea

- Industry: Banking
- Founded: 1994
- Headquarters: Asmara, Eritrea
- Website: erhcb.com

The Housing and Commerce Bank (HCB) ((Tigrinya)ባንክ ኣባይትን ንግድን) is a bank in Asmara, Eritrea. The company has focused on financing various apartment complexes throughout Eritrea, most notably in Asmara and Massawa. It has also extended loans to local companies involved in the Wefri Warsay Yika'alo.

== History ==
The organisation was founded in 1994 after independence of Eritrea, under the name Housing Bank of Eritrea. In the process it took over the previous Asmara branch of the Ethiopian Housing and Savings Bank, a savings bank set up with the assistance of Cassa di Risparmio delle Provincie Lombarde. HCB's original mission was to provide services to mitigate the acute housing shortage after the Eritrean War for Independence. The firm's name was changed in 1996 when the majority shareholder, the People's Front for Democracy and Justice, decided that it should become a full-fledged bank.

== See also ==
- Banking in Eritrea
- List of banks in Eritrea
