= Società Bancaria Italiana =

Former Italian bank

- Formerly: Figli Weill Shott & C. and Società Bancaria Milanese
- Company type: Private company
- Industry: Financial services
- Founded: 1898; 128 years ago
- Founders: Alberto, Cimone and Filippo Weill Schott
- Defunct: 1904
- Fate: Merged
- Successor: Banca Italiana di Sconto
- Headquarters: Milan, Italy
- Products: Banking services

The Società Bancaria Italiana (SBI, lit. 'Italian Banking Company') was a significant Italian bank, based in Milan. It was established in 1904 by renaming of Società Bancaria Milanese (1898–1904), itself the successor of Figli Weill Shott & C. (1850–1898).

In the early 20th century, it was one of Italy's four dominant universal banks, together with Banca Commerciale Italiana, Credito Italiano, and Banco di Roma. After narrowly surviving financial distress in 1907 thanks to government intervention, the SBI merged in 1915 with the Società Italiana di Credito Provinciale to form the Banca Italiana di Sconto.

== History ==
The origins of the SBI go back to 1850 when brothers Alberto, Cimone and Filippo Weill Schott, descendants of a family of Jewish bankers originally from Austria, co-founded Figli Weill Shott & C. in Milan. On 13 October 1898, that family bank was reorganized as Società Bancaria Milanese, a joint-stock company with a share capital of 4 million lire. In 1901, the bank's longstanding president Alberto Weill Schott (1837–1901) died suddenly and was replaced by Count Felice Scheibler. In 1902, it opened a branch in Shanghai to finance the Italian share of the Boxer Indemnities.

On 28 October 1904, the Società Bancaria Milanese changed its name to Società Bancaria Italiana to signal its nationwide ambition. At the same time, it absorbed the operations of the Banco di Sconto e Sete which had remained in liquidation for years. This made the SBI the third-largest bank in Italy, behind Banca Commerciale Italiana and Credito Italiano (known colloquially as Comit and Credit), a mitigation of the latter's duopoly that was encouraged by the Bank of Italy and its governor Bonaldo Stringher. It soon moved from the old Weill-Schott building on Piazza Belgioioso into a prestigious new head office building on Via Monte Napoleone. In 1905, it participated in an international consortium to establish the Bank of Abyssinia, and in 1907 led the Italian share in the creation of the State Bank of Morocco.

The SBI was more directly affected than its Italian peers by the panic of 1907, which came after signs of weakness that accumulated from the summer of that year, particularly in its branch in Genoa that had developed increasingly autonomously from headquarters in the previous years. A bank run started in late August and gathered pace in September. On 11 October 1907, the Bank of Italy led the formation of a banking consortium to support the SBI, with participation from the Comit and Credit. This failed to prevent a 23-percent fall of the SBI's stock price by end-October, also inducing a decline of the Bank of Italy's own share price. The consortium agreed on a second support package on 7 November 1907, and on 25 November 1907 the Italian treasury added its own direct support. This represented a watershed moment in terms of state intervention to preserve financial stability, not just in Italy but also from a European perspective.

On 22 February 1908, a tumultuous general shareholders' meeting of the SBI was held in Milan, in which participants denounced the lack of accountability of the board of directors. The mismanagement at the bank and especially its Genoa branch was also the matter of numerous lawsuits. Shortly afterwards, the entire management of the SBI was replaced, with new leadership headed by Roberto Calegari, previously director of the Turin branch of the Bank of Italy. This was widely viewed as reflecting Stringher's aim to control the situation, which had already manifested itself with a regulatory change of 31 December 1907 which had strengthened the Bank of Italy's intervention powers. Under this new framework, the SBI was able to return the financial aid received in 1907, and at the end of 1908 the rescue consortium was dissolved, but the bank remained perceived as fragile. In mid-1908 it made unsuccessful attempts at merging with mid-sized regional peers, the Banco della Liguria and Banca Bergamasca di Depositi e Crediti. The SBI's condition only decisively improved in 1911–1912, when French investors offered to inject new capital, first a short-lived attempt by the Crédit Mobilier Français then a successful one by the recently created Banque Louis-Dreyfus, which secured 7 seats on the 17-strong board of directors. The bank's expansion could restart by opening new branches and buying small local banks, with 24 local offices at end-1912 and 33 at end-1913.

Meanwhile, the Crédit Mobilier Français had invested in the Società Italiana di Credito Provinciale (SICP, until 1911 Banca di Busto Arsizio), and in the charged geopolitical context of 1914, the French government was actively in favor of a combination of the two French-supported banks to check the perception of German influence over Comit (and according to some, over Giovanni Giolitti who was Prime Minister in early 1914). The merger was eventually executed in several steps. On 30 December 1914, the Banca Italiana di Sconto (BIS) was established as a new entity with a capital of 15 million lire, of which a significant part was subscribed by the Perrones, owners of Ansaldo. Then in May 1915, a portfolio of risky assets was transferred by the SBI to a bad bank, the Società Finanziaria di Liquidazione, which was provided with a capital of 5 million by the shareholders of the SBI. Following this transaction and a similar one involving the SICP, the two banks' balance sheets were much sounder, allowing them to merge into the BIS on 2 June 1915. That complex operation was supported by the atmosphere of patriotic enthusiasm that immediately followed the Italian entry into World War I. The newly merged entity had a share capital of 70 million, a widespread presence in 68 cities and a solid financial position, immediately securing a strong position as Italy's third-largest bank on most parameters.

== See also ==
- Banque Française pour le Commerce et l'Industrie
- List of banks in Italy
