= Eritrean Investment and Development Bank =

Bank of Eritrea

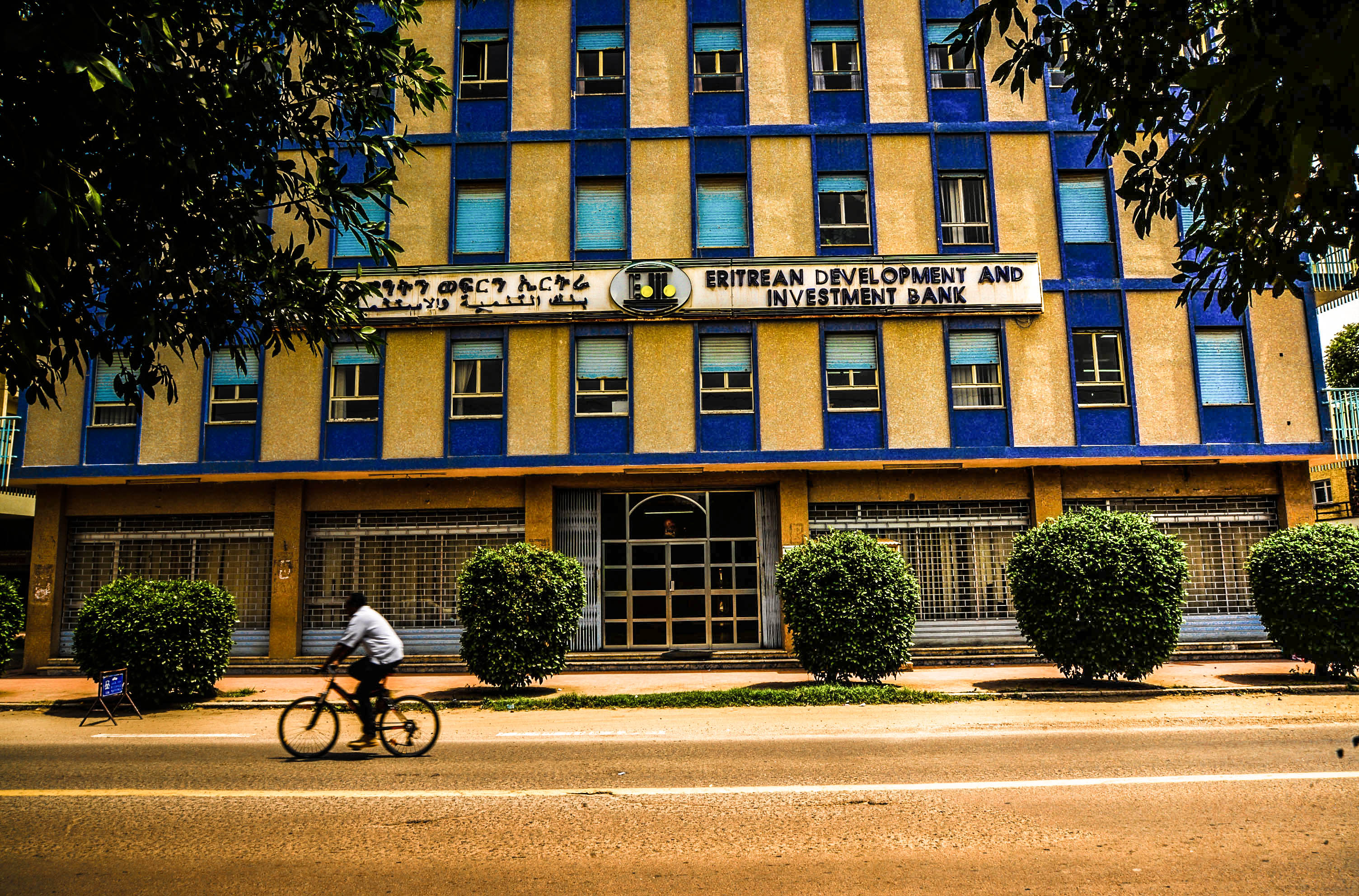
Street view of the building

The Eritrean Investment and Development Bank (EIDB) is a bank in Eritrea. It was established on 28 October 1996. It did not effectively begin operations until 1998 from its single office in Asmara, Eritrea. The bank was fully financed by the Ministry of Finance, and thus the financial institution is a property of the Eritrean government.

The Eritrean Investment and Development Bank is the smallest of Eritrean government-owned banks. It typically finances development projects by funneling funds from various other organizations, including the Bank of Eritrea and the World Bank.

== See also ==
- Banking in Eritrea
- List of banks in Eritrea
