= Banca Nazionale di Credito =

Former Italian bank

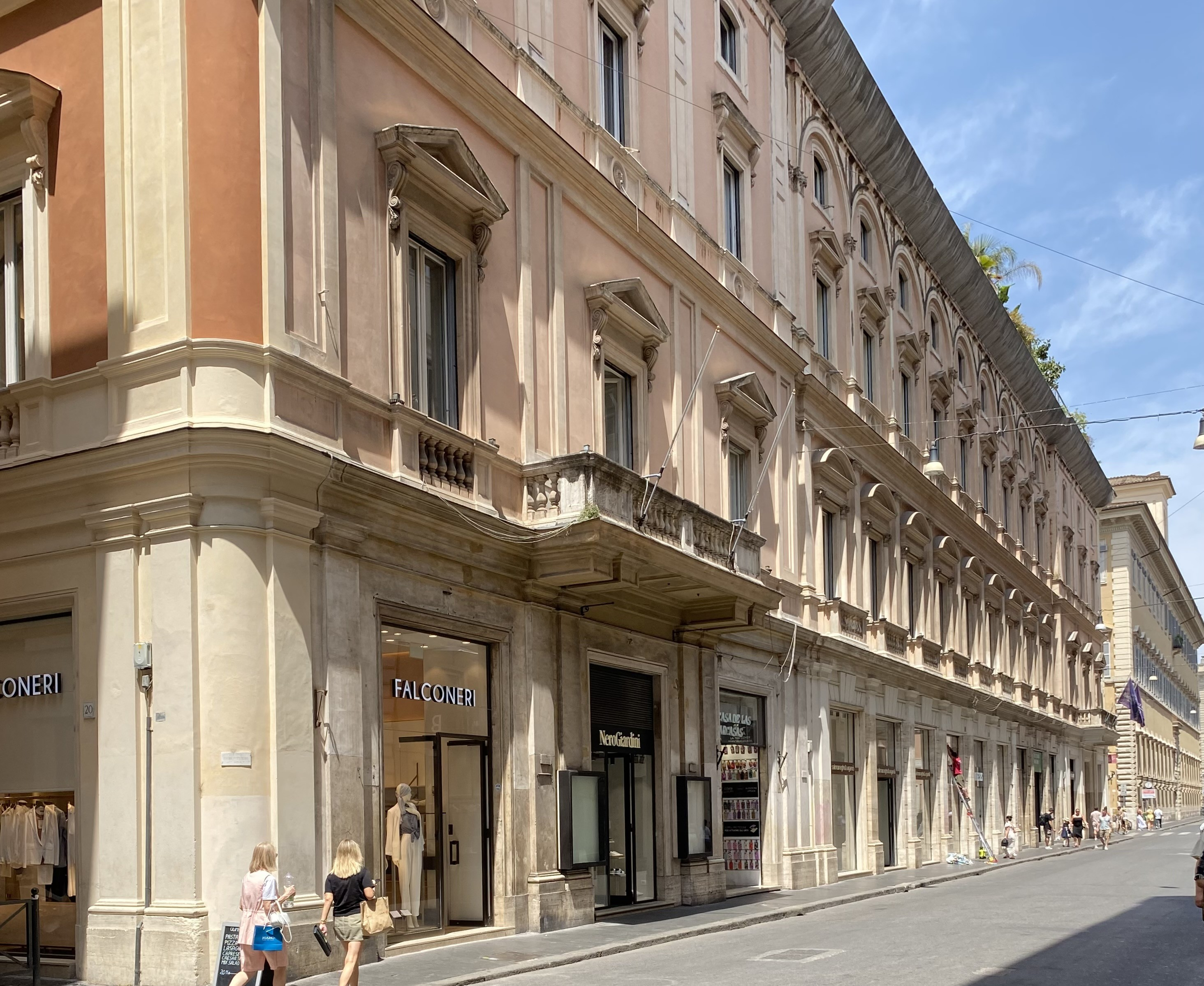
- Former head office, Via del Corso in Rome
- Company type: Private company
- Industry: Financial services
- Founded: 1922
- Defunct: 1930
- Fate: Acquired
- Successor: Credito Italiano
- Headquarters: Rome, Italy
- Area served: Italy
- Products: Manage the liquidation of a failed bank, banking services

The Banca Nazionale di Credito (BNC, lit. 'National Credit Bank') was a significant Italian bank during the 1920s. It was founded in 1922 to manage the liquidation of the Banca Italiana di Sconto (BIS), the country's third-largest bank that had failed the previous year.

In 1926, the Istituto Liquidazioni was established for the purpose of managing the legacies of failed banks, and took over that activity from the BNC, which nevertheless continued operating as a major bank.

Future Bank of Italy governor Donato Menichella worked at the BNC from 1924 to 1931.

The BNC was still the country's third-largest bank in 1930, when it was purchased by Credito Italiano in what was then the largest-ever bank merger in Italy.

== See also ==
- Bad bank
- Banco di Roma
- List of banks in Italy
