= Eritrean nakfa =

Currency of Eritrea

ናቕፋ (Tigrinya); ناكفا (Arabic)
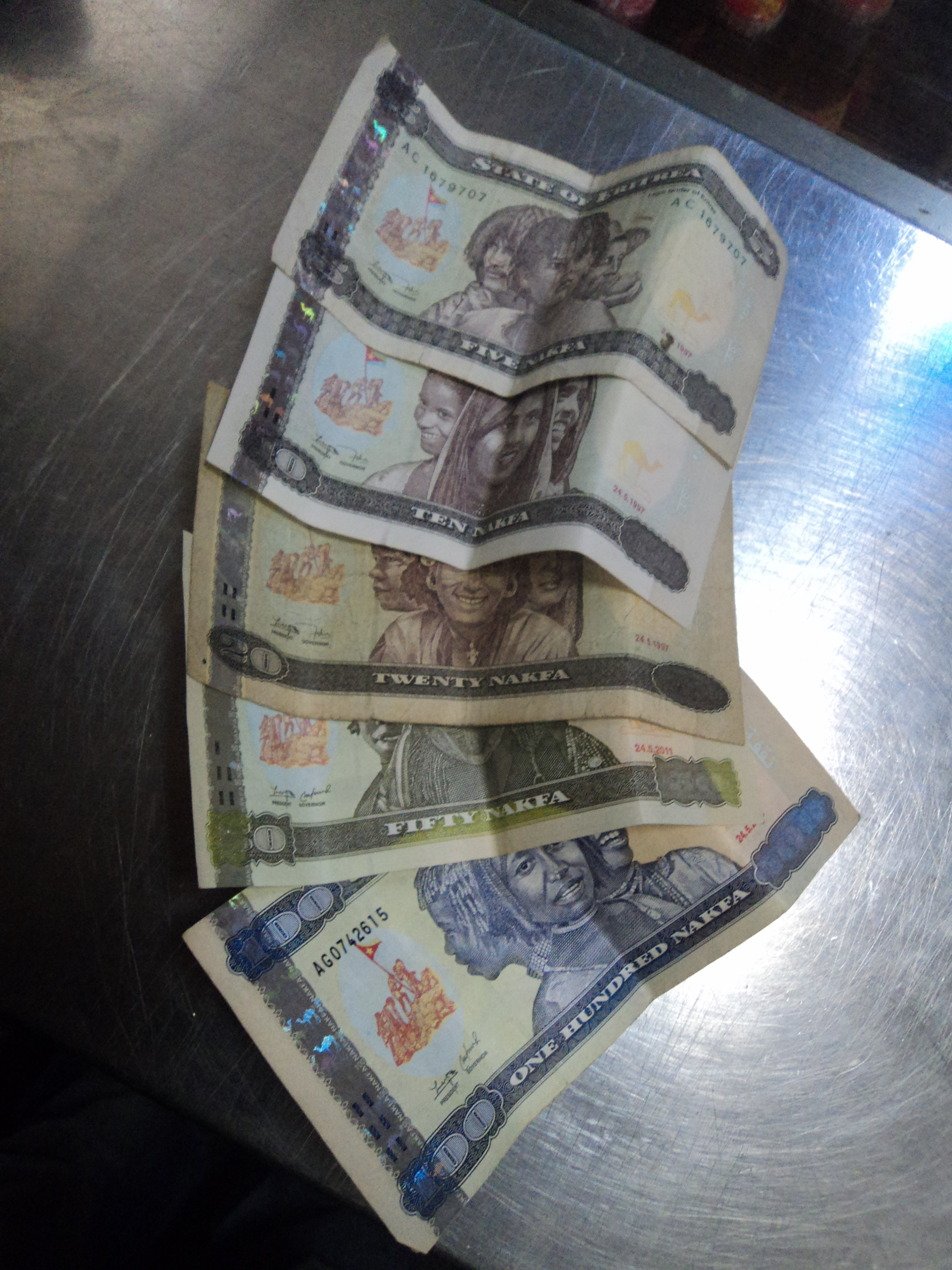
- Nakfa banknotes

ISO 4217
- Code: ERN (numeric: 232)
- Subunit: 0.01

Units of account
- Symbol: Nfk (Latin script) ናቕፋ (Ge'ez script) ناكفا (Arabic script)
- Subunit
- 1/100: Cent

Denominations
- Banknotes: 1, 5, 10, 20, 50, 100 nakfa
- Coins: 1, 5, 10, 25, 50, 100 cents

Demographics
- Date of introduction: 15 November 1997
- User(s): Eritrea

Issuance
- Central bank: Bank of Eritrea

Valuation
- Inflation: 9%
- Source: April 2017
- Pegged with: U.S. dollar = 15 nakfa

The nakfa (ISO 4217 code: ERN; Tigrinya: ናቕፋ naḳfa, or Arabic: ناكفا or نقفة nākfā) is the currency of Eritrea and was introduced on 15 November 1997 to replace the birr at par. The currency takes its name from the Eritrean town of Nakfa, site of the first major victory of the Eritrean War of Independence. The nakfa is divided into 100 cents.

The nakfa is pegged to the US dollar at a fixed rate of US$1 = ERN 15. At earlier times, it was officially pegged at US$1 = ERN 13.50. The currency is not fully convertible, so black market rates available on the streets typically offered a rate of 15 nakfas per dollar.

Between 18 November and 31 December 2015, the Bank of Eritrea began replacement of all nakfa banknotes. The banknote replacement initiative was designed to combat counterfeiting, the informal economy but primarily Sudanese human traffickers who had accepted payments in nakfa banknotes in exchange for transporting would-be migrants primarily to Europe. A consequence of this was substantial amounts of the country's currency existed in vast hoards outside of Eritrea.

The plan to replace the country's currency was top secret and designed to prevent human traffickers bringing their funds back in time to exchange for the new banknotes. On 1 January 2016 the old nakfa banknotes ceased being recognized as legal tender, rendering external stockpiles of currency worthless.

The current series of banknotes is the artwork of an Afro-American banknote designer, Clarence Holbert, and printed by German currency printer Giesecke & Devrient.

== Coins ==
Nakfa coins are made entirely of nickel-clad steel. Each coin has a different reeded edge, instead of consistent reeding for all denominations. The 1 nakfa coin carries the denomination "100 cents". The common reverse shows fighters raising the Eritrean flag, the date "1991" and the legend "Liberty, Equality and Justice."

Image	Value	Obverse design
	1 cent	Red-fronted gazelle
	5 cents	Leopard
	10 cents	North African ostrich
	25 cents	Grévy's zebra
	50 cents	Greater kudu
	100 cents	African bush elephant and calf

== Banknotes ==
The nakfa banknotes were designed by Clarence Holbert of the United States Bureau of Engraving and Printing in 1994. They depict ordinary people from each of Eritrea's nine principal ethnic groups (Tigrinya, Tigre, Rashaida, Nara, Afar, Saho, Bilen, Beja, Kunama), rather than any political or historical figures.

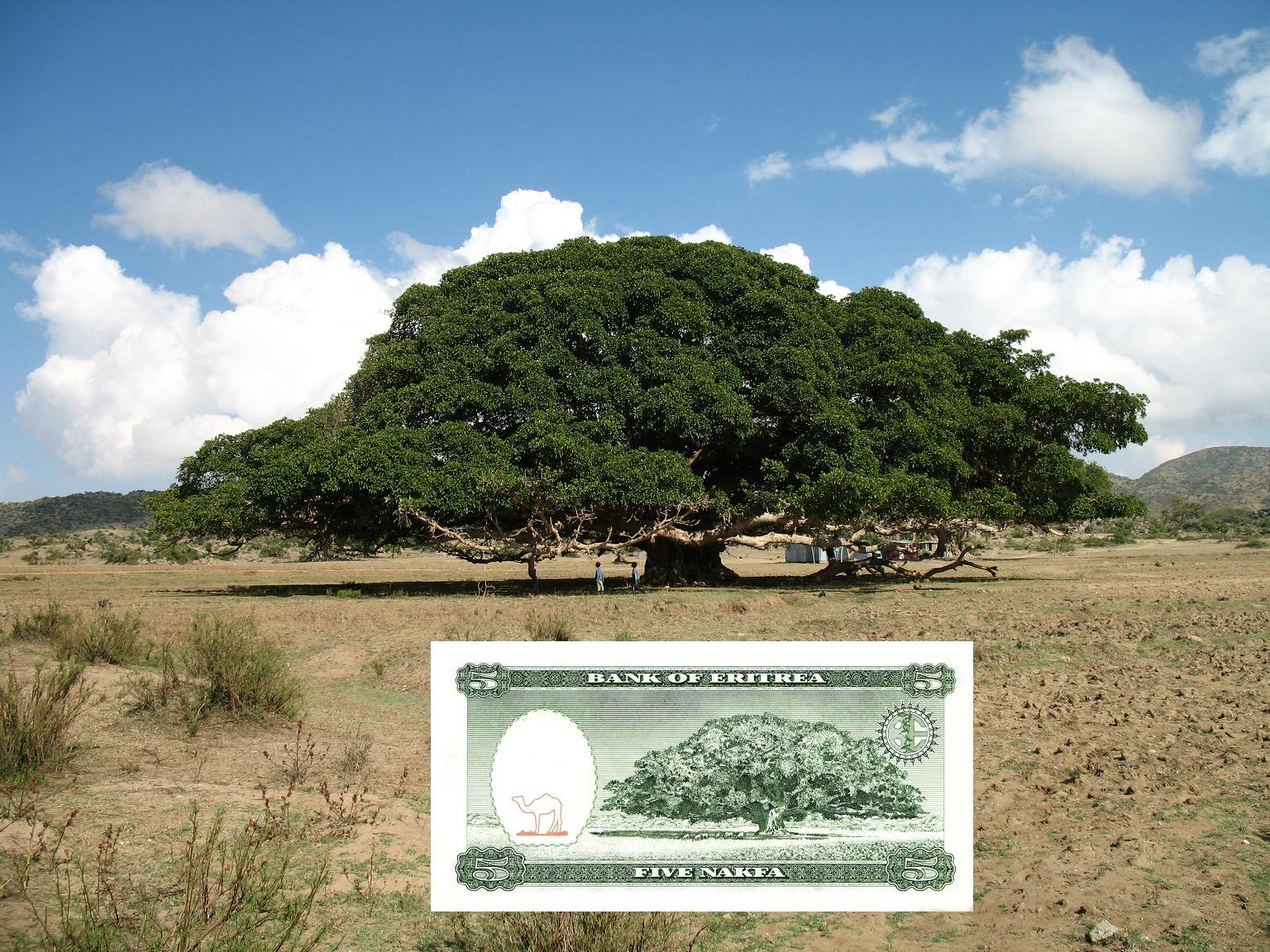
The back of the five Nakfa bank note with the actual Ficus sycomorus tree shown above it.

There have been five series of banknotes since the currency's launch. The first issue for all denominations was dated 24 May 1997; the second issue consists of only the 50 and 100 nakfa notes and is dated 24 May 2004; the third issues also consists of only the 50 and 100 nakfa notes and was dated 24 May 2011, and the fourth issues consisted of only the 10 and 20 nakfa notes and was dated 24 May 2012. (24 May is Eritrea's Independence Day). The current fifth banknote series which rendered all previous currency valueless is dated 24 May 2015.

Banknotes of the Eritrean nakfa (1997–present series)
Image	Value	Dimensions	Main color	Description		Date of issue	Date of first issue	Watermark
Image	Value	Dimensions	Main color	Obverse	Reverse	Date of issue	Date of first issue	Watermark
1 nakfa	1 nakfa	140 x 70 mm	Dark brown and black on multicolored underprint	Triple portrait of three children of Eritrea's nine nationalities; flag raising	Children in bush school	1997; 2015	24 May 1997	Camel head
5 nakfa	5 nakfa	140 x 70 mm	Dark brown and black on multicolored underprint	Triple portrait of Eritrea's nine nationalities: Young boy, young man, and older man; flag raising	Sycamore fig tree	1997; 2015	24 May 1997	Camel head
10 nakfa	10 nakfa	140 x 70 mm	Dark brown and black on multicolored underprint	Triple portrait of three young women of Eritrea's nine nationalities; flag raising	Eritrean railway	1997; 2012; 2015	24 May 1997	Camel head
20 nakfa	20 nakfa	140 x 70 mm	Dark brown and black on multicolored underprint	Triple portrait of three young women of Eritrea's nine nationalities; flag raising	Three agricultural scenes: farmer plowing with a camel, women harvesting, woman on tractor	1997; 2012; 2015	24 May 1997	Camel head
50 nakfa	50 nakfa	143 x 71 mm	Brown-red on pale yellow underprint	Triple portrait of three women of Eritrea's nine nationalities; flag raising	Freighter ships at Massawa port	1997; 2004; 2011; 2015	24 May 1997	Camel head
100 nakfa	100 nakfa	147 x 72 mm	Blue and black on pale yellow underprint	Triple portrait of three women of Eritrea's nine nationalities; flag raising	Farmers plowing with oxen	1997; 2004; 2011	24 May 1997	Camel head

== Exchange rate ==
Current ERN exchange rates
From Google Finance:	AUD CAD CHF CNY EUR GBP HKD JPY USD ETB
From Yahoo! Finance:	AUD CAD CHF CNY EUR GBP HKD JPY USD ETB
From XE.com:	AUD CAD CHF CNY EUR GBP HKD JPY USD ETB
From OANDA:	AUD CAD CHF CNY EUR GBP HKD JPY USD ETB

Eritrea's government has resisted calls to float the nation's currency, preferring the stability of a fixed exchange rate. However periodic devaluations have been made. As of January 2025 the official exchange rate was 15 ERN to 1 USD. ERN is a very weak currency. The de facto exchange rate of the currency is around 100 ERN for US$1. The currency does not have a good demand outside of Eritrea. The black markets that exist in Asmara and a few other towns show the diminishing values of ERN.

== See also ==
- Economy of Eritrea

Preceded by: Ethiopian birr Reason: currency independence Ratio: at par	Currency of Eritrea; 1997 –	Succeeded by: Current
