= Elabored Estate =

Government cooperative in Elabored

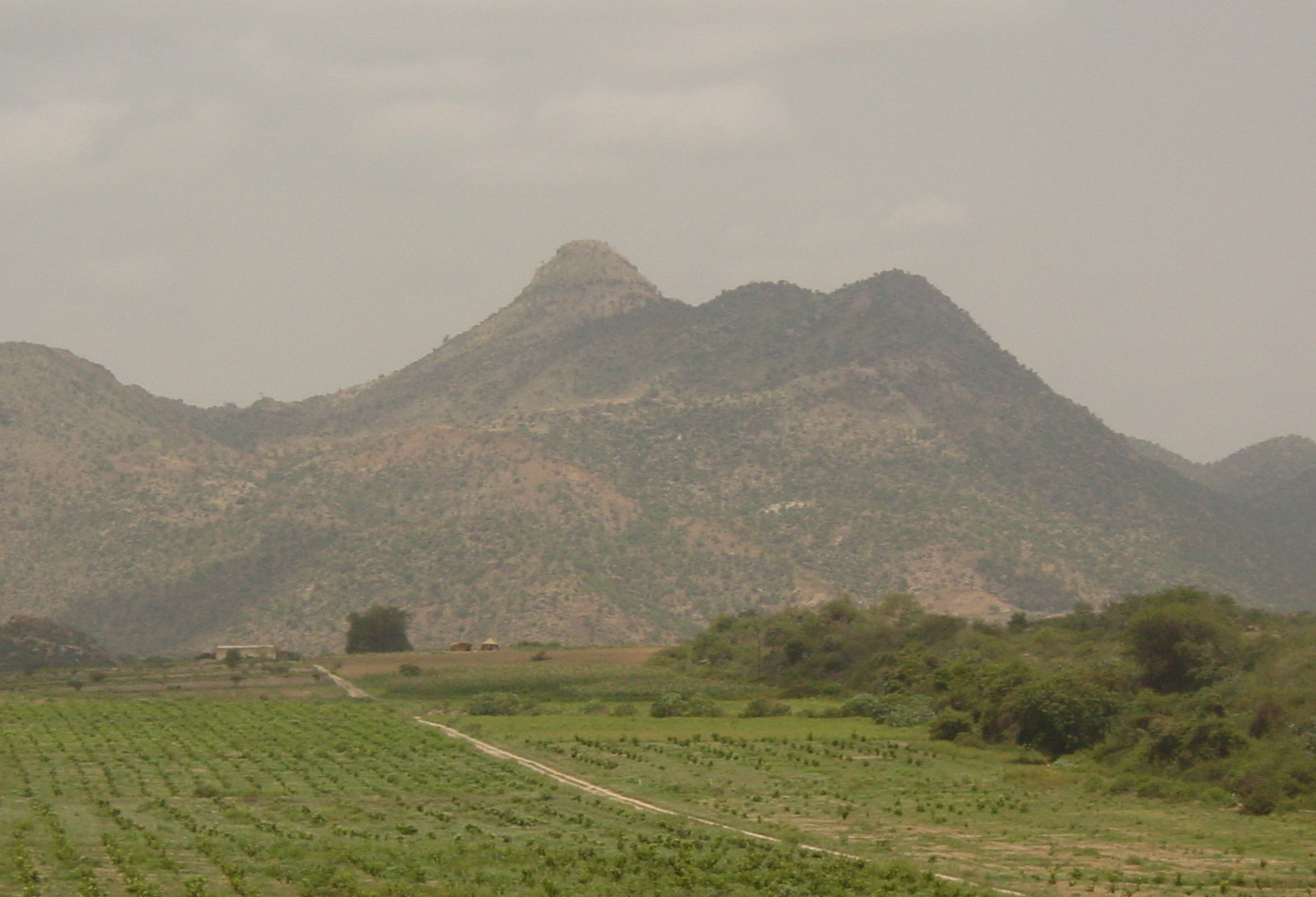
Grove of citrus trees at the Elabared Estate in Elabored, Eritrea.

The Elabared Estate is a Government operated cooperative immediately outside the small town of Elabored, Eritrea.

== History ==
In 1908 Pietro Casciani, an Italian colonial immigrant was granted a plot of 10 km^{2} and planted grains. In 1958 Fratelli De Nadai purchased Pietro Casciani's land and replanted with citrus for export. During the ownership of De Nadai there was a great expansion of goods produced at the plantation, with the addition of a canning plant, dairy factory and winery.

Production fluctuated during the Eritrean War of Independence, specifically after the massacre of the elders in the nearby village. The Estate was nationalized by the Derg in 1975 but was liberated by the Eritrean People's Liberation Front (EPLF) in 1977. In that same year however, the EPLF withdrew in what was called the Strategic Withdrawal.

After Independence the EPLF (later the People's Front for Democracy and Justice) offered the plantation to private capital however, no buyers availed themselves of the opportunity.
