= Commercial Bank of Eritrea =

Banking institution in Eritrea

The Commercial Bank of Eritrea is the only banking institution in Eritrea with full retail commercial banking services. It is a government-owned bank, with 17 branches throughout the country. The Bank has arrangements with Citibank for international money transfer, as well as with Deutsche Bank.

== History ==
When Eritrea achieved its independence in 1991, it took over the Eritrean branches of the Commercial Bank of Ethiopia. The Eritrean government formally chartered the Commercial Bank of Eritrea in 1994.

== See also ==
- Banking in Eritrea
- List of banks in Eritrea
