= Banking in Eritrea =

Modern banking in Eritrea started with the arrival of the Italian colonizers. However, from 1974 on (due to the nationalization decided by the Ethiopian Government of Mengistu Haile Mariam), the banking sector became a government monopoly. This situation continued after Eritrea achieved its independence. The Bank of Eritrea is the central bank of Eritrea.

At present there are three commercial banks in operation in Eritrea - The Commercial Bank, The Housing and Commercial Bank, and the Eritrean Investment and Development Bank. All banks with the exception of the Housing and Commercial Bank are under state ownership, while the Housing and Commercial Banks is owned by the ruling party, the PFDJ.

== History ==
In 1914, the Italian government authorized the Banca d'Italia, the Italian central bank, to operate under special regime and therefore to carry out in the colonies operations not allowed in Italy, including commercial banking. Banca d'Italia then established its first two branches in Asmara and Massawa. Two more banks followed: Banca Cooperativa Popolare Eritrea with its headquarters in Asmara was established in 1915, the Banca per l'Africa Orientale was established in 1917, with its head office in Massawa and a branch in Mogadishu (Somalia). These two private banks however collapsed just few years later.

By the end of the Italian colonial period in 1941, there were four banks and one credit union operating in Eritrea. These banks were: Banca d'Italia, Banco di Napoli, Banco di Roma, Banca Nazionale del Lavoro and Cassa di Credito Agrario e Minerario. These banks had 13 branches in six Eritrean cities: Asmara, Massawa, Keren, Adikeyh, Decamahare and Assab.

However, the banks mostly served the Italians and foreign businessmen (Armenians, Egyptians, Greeks, Indians, Yemenis) living in the colony. The arrival of the British military administration in Eritrea in 1941 started to change this situation. Barclays Bank established two branches in Eritrea, Asmara in 1941 and Massawa in 1942. In 1943, the British authorities permitted Banco di Napoli and Banco di Roma to reopen their branches.

Commercial banking continued in Eritrea during the federation with Ethiopia. In this period the Commercial Bank of Ethiopia had branches in Asmara (two offices), Massawa and Assab. Banco di Roma had branches in Asmara, Massawa, and Assab and Banco di Napoli had one branch in Asmara. However, Barclays Bank left the country.

In 1974, when the Dergue came to power, it nationalized all private sector establishments, including the banks. All banking services were merged under the Commercial Bank of Ethiopia, which monopolized the banking service.

After independence, the Commercial Bank of Ethiopia's branch in Eritrea became the Commercial Bank of Eritrea. The Eritrean government also established the Bank of Eritrea as its central bank.

== Banking Services in Eritrea today ==
Banking is the dominant sector in the financial system of Eritrea. The balance of the financial system is made up by the insurance industry. At present there are no privately owned banks in Eritrea. The Augaro Bank was short-lived.

The Bank of Eritrea (BoE) is responsible for regulating lending and deposit interest rates while keeping a handle on inflation and other macroeconomic indicators. The BoE has not been able to control inflation, which is now up to 23% per annum.

The Commercial Bank of Eritrea is the dominant bank in the country. It owns nearly 80% of all banking sector assets in the country and is a state-owned bank. It has branches in the larger cities and towns of every Eritrean region.

Housing and Commercial Bank of Eritrea is the second biggest bank in current operation. The Bank was established in 1994 to provide banking service to residential buildings. Later, in 1996 it extended its services to full commercial services. It too has branches throughout the country.

The third bank is the Eritrean Investment and Development Bank. Primarily the bank was established to provide agricultural and commercial loans to investors. The Eritrean Investment and Development Bank and the Agricultural and Industrial Bank of Eritrea also have branches in the major cities of the regions.
