= Sabur Printing Press =

- Company type: Private
- Industry: printing
- Founded: 1997
- Founder: Kassahun Chekole, People's Front for Democracy and Justice
- Headquarters: Asmara, Eritrea
- Number of employees: 280 (2011)

The Sabur Printing Press (SPP) is the exclusive printing company in Eritrea. Its headquarters are located in the national capital, Asmara.

The firm was established in 1997. Its press provides printing services for private individuals, as well as government organizations. It was founded by Kassahun Chekole in partnership with the People's Front for Democracy and Justice (PFDJ).

In 2007, the company modernized its equipment. In 2009, it won the Ministry of Education's auction to print the country's schoolbooks. By 2011, it had printed over 7 million books for the Ministry of Education.
