= Red Sea Trading Corporation =

Eritrean corporation

Corporate office for the Red Sea Trading Corporation in downtown Asmara, Eritrea.

The Red Sea Trading Corporation (commonly known as 09) is the commercial entity created to enact the People's Front for Democracy and Justice's socially responsible development program. The company was founded with $20,000 in 1984. It is primarily involved in international trade and is the largest importer in the country. The company grew out of the necessity for the Eritrean People's Liberation Front to commercially develop the territory that it had captured during the Eritrean War of Independence. Its guiding mission is closely related to the related Nakfa Corporation.

The chief executive officer of the organization is Hagos Ghebrehiwet, who is also the economic advisor to the (PFDJ).

RSTC owns the soccer team Red Sea.

== History ==
After Gaafar Nimeiry imposed Sharia law in Sudan in 1983, the Red Sea Trading Corporation started to smuggle large volumes of alcohol in Sudan.

During the 1990s, many heads of the company were accused of corruption and incarcerated. The government had discovered that the RSTC enjoyed excessive tax exemptions. From 2000 to 2002, the RSTC and Saudi businessman Khalid bin Mahfouz invested in Red Sea Airlines to attempt to save it from bankruptcy.

In 2017, a vessel containing thousands of blank-firing pistols was seized in Somalia. It was identified as a RSTC-owned shipment destined to be smuggled in Sudan.

== U.S. sanctions ==
On 12 November 2021, the U.S. Department of the Treasury added the Red Sea Trading Company to its Specially Designated Nationals (SDN) list. Individuals on the list have their assets blocked and U.S. persons are generally prohibited from dealing with them.

Ghebrehiwet was designated for having materially assisted, sponsored, or provided financial, material, or technological support for, or goods or services to or in support of, the PFDJ. RSTC manages the property and financial interests of the PFDJ, acts as its funder, and provides it business assistance. RSTC was designated for being owned or controlled by Ghebrehiwet.
