= Nakfa Corporation =

The Nakfa Corporation was one of the first privately owned companies founded in Eritrea. The firm has various interests, including Gejeret Corrugated Boxes, a sodium silicate factory, and a mid-rise structure in Asmara bearing its name (the Nakfa Building).

In May 2006, the capital held by the company amounted to 120 million nakfa.
