= Banca per l'Africa Orientale =

Bank in Italian colonial Africa

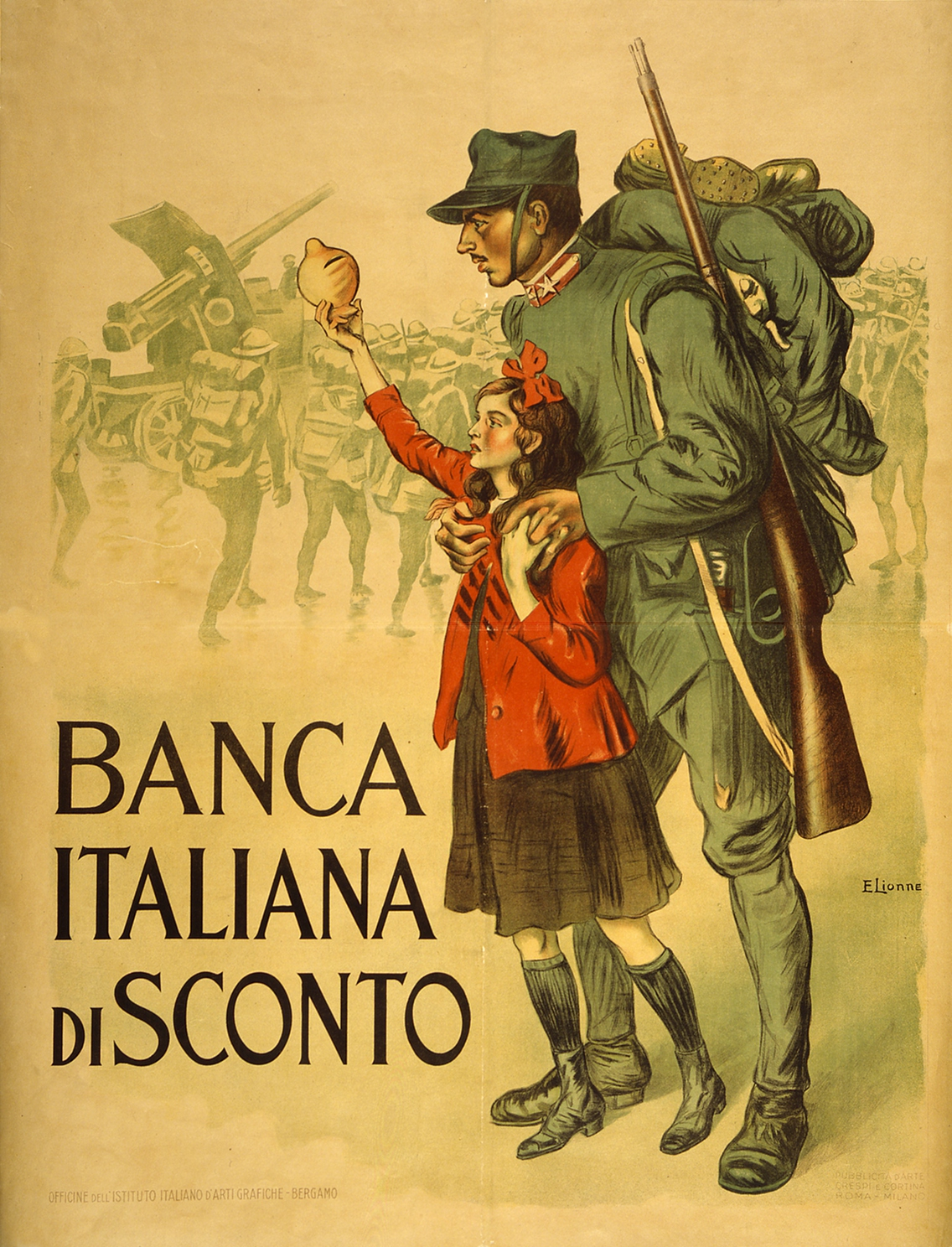
The Banca Italiana di Sconto was the promotor of the BAO

Banca per l’Africa Orientale (BAO) was an early attempt to establish modern banking in the Horn of Africa at a time when Eritrea and Italian Somaliland were Italian colonies. It closed in 1923.

== History ==
During early WW1, the Italian government wanted the creation of a local bank in the Italian colonies of eastern Africa. It was the first tentative to create a modern banking system in all colonial Africa. In 1914 the central "Bank of Italy" started to operate in Asmara and promoted the creation of private banks — like the "BAO" — in the Italian colonies. The Banca Italiana di Sconto (BIS) was a leading Italian bank that indirectly supported the BAO, but BSI failed in 1921, leading to the failure of the BAO a few years later.

- 1917 -BIS promoted the formation of the Banca per l’Africa Orientale as a joint stock company in Rome.
- 1918 - BAO commenced operations with head office in Massawa and a branch in Mogadishu that was the first bank in Somalia.
- 1923 - BAO was liquidated following problems at the bank and the failure of Banca Italiana di Sconto.

In late 1923 the Banca per l'Africa Orientale was officially closed.

== Bibliography ==
- Falchero, Maria. La Banca Italiana di Sconto, 1914-1921. Sette anni di guerra Franco Angeli. Milano, 1990 ISBN 88-204-3713-9
- Mauri, Arnaldo (1998), "The First Monetary and Banking Experiences in Eritrea". African Review of Money, Finance and Banking, n. 1-2: pp. 67–84.

== See also ==
- Africa Orientale Italiana
- Banca Italiana di Sconto
