= Banco di Roma =

Former Italian bank

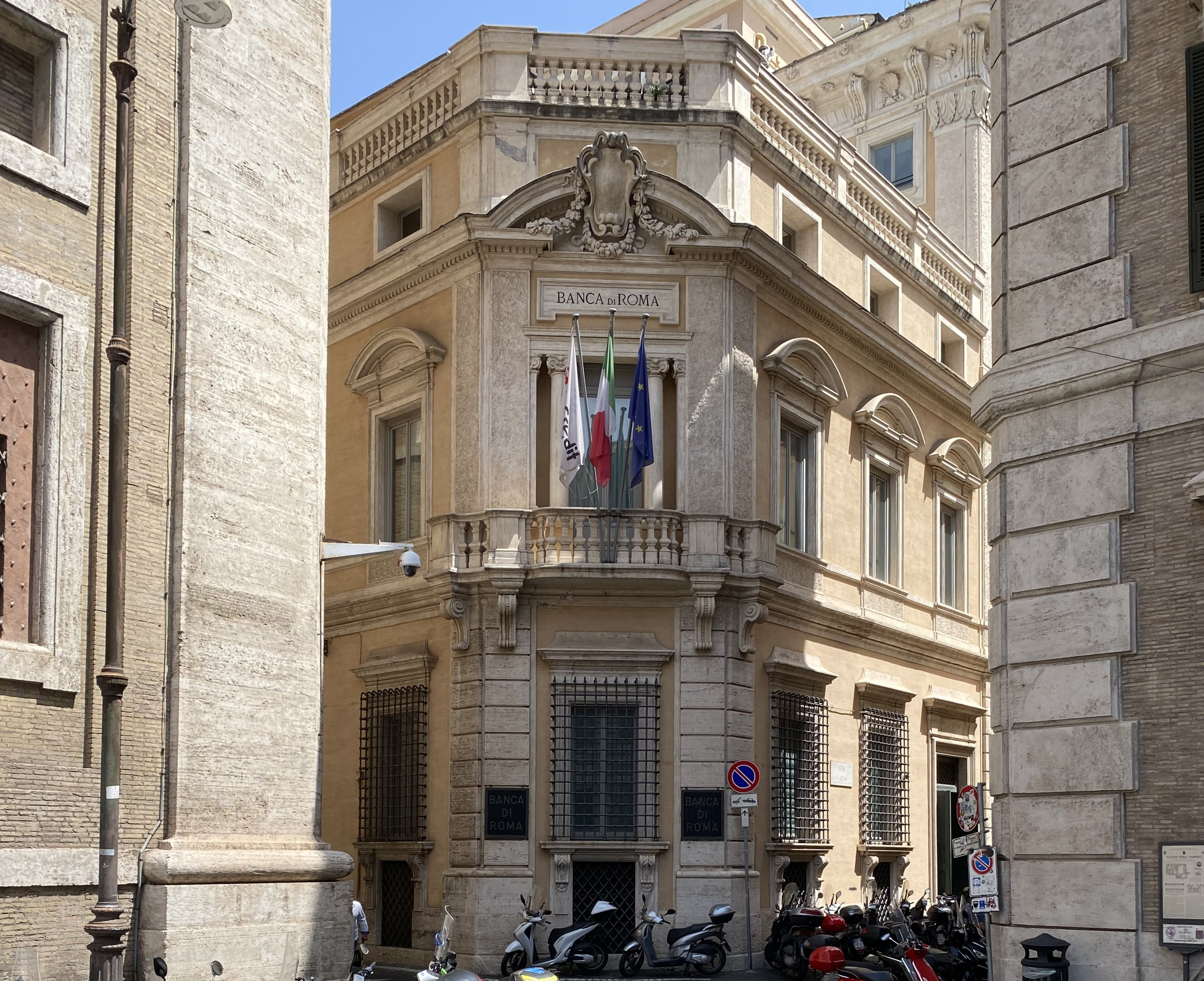
Former head office of Banco di Roma, viewed from Piazza del Collegio Romano

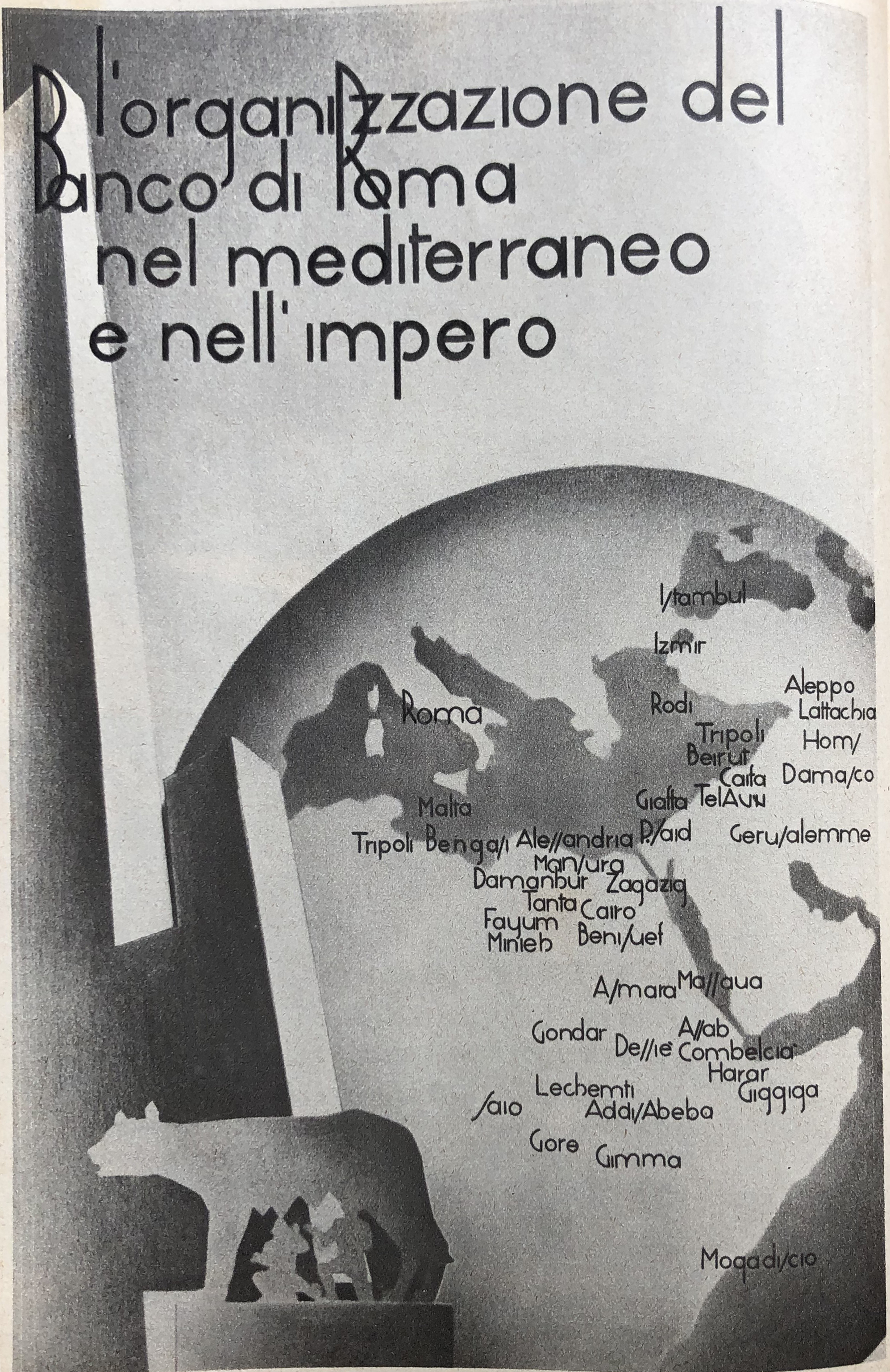
1939 advert showcasing the Banco di Roma's network in Africa and the Middle East

Banco di Roma was an Italian bank based in Rome, established on 9 March 1880. In the early 20th century, it was one of Italy's four dominant universal banks, together with Banca Commerciale Italiana, Credito Italiano, and Società Bancaria Italiana. It developed a significant network throughout the Eastern Mediterranean and Italian Africa. In 1992 it eventually merged with the Banco di Santo Spirito and altered its name to Banca di Roma, later part of UniCredit.

== Overview ==
Banco di Roma opened branches in Alexandria in 1905, Cairo and Malta in 1906, Tripoli and Benghazi in 1907, and Constantinople in 1911. It expanded further in the Middle East, in Jerusalem before the end of World War I then in 1919 in Istanbul, Smyrna, Beirut, Aleppo, Tripoli, İskenderun, Mersin, Adana, Jaffa, and Haifa. In 1920, it formed a new affiliate, Banco di Roma per l'Egitto ed il Levante, which took over the operations in Egypt, Palestine, Lebanon and Syria. In 1924, the Egyptian business was spun off as Banco Italo-Egiziano, in which the Banca Nazionale di Credito and Credito Italiano took equity stakes.

By 1926, Banco di Roma had 2,756 employees in Italy and 316 overseas, including 145 in Turkey, 77 in Syria and Lebanon, 40 in Palestine, 20 in Malta, 20 in Switzerland, 10 in London, and 2 in New York. The bank further opened branches in Homs in 1928, Latakia in 1929, and Tel Aviv in 1931. It had to close all its branches in Palestine and Malta, however, with the entry into World War II in 1940.

Like other European banks in the region, Banco di Roma was affected by the spread of Arab nationalism. In 1960, Banco Italo-Egiziano transferred its Egyptian business to the National Bank of Egypt. Syria nationalized the bank's operations on its territory in 1961 as Banque de l’Unité Arabe, as did Libya in 1970 as Umma Bank. By contrast, the Banco di Roma maintained a continuous presence in Turkey from its first establishment in 1911 to the market liberalization of the 1980s and beyond.

In 1991, the bank was merged with Banco di Santo Spirito and Cassa di Risparmio di Roma to form Banca di Roma, a predecessor of Capitalia (which was acquired by UniCredit in 2007).

Banco di Roma also owned a reported 30% stake in a Belgian bank in 1989. The Belgian subsidiary, Banco di Roma (Belgio) S.A., was acquired by Monte dei Paschi di Siena (MPS) in 1992.

Banco di Roma also sold subsidiary Banco di Perugia to Banca Toscana, a subsidiary of MPS in 1990.

== Gallery ==
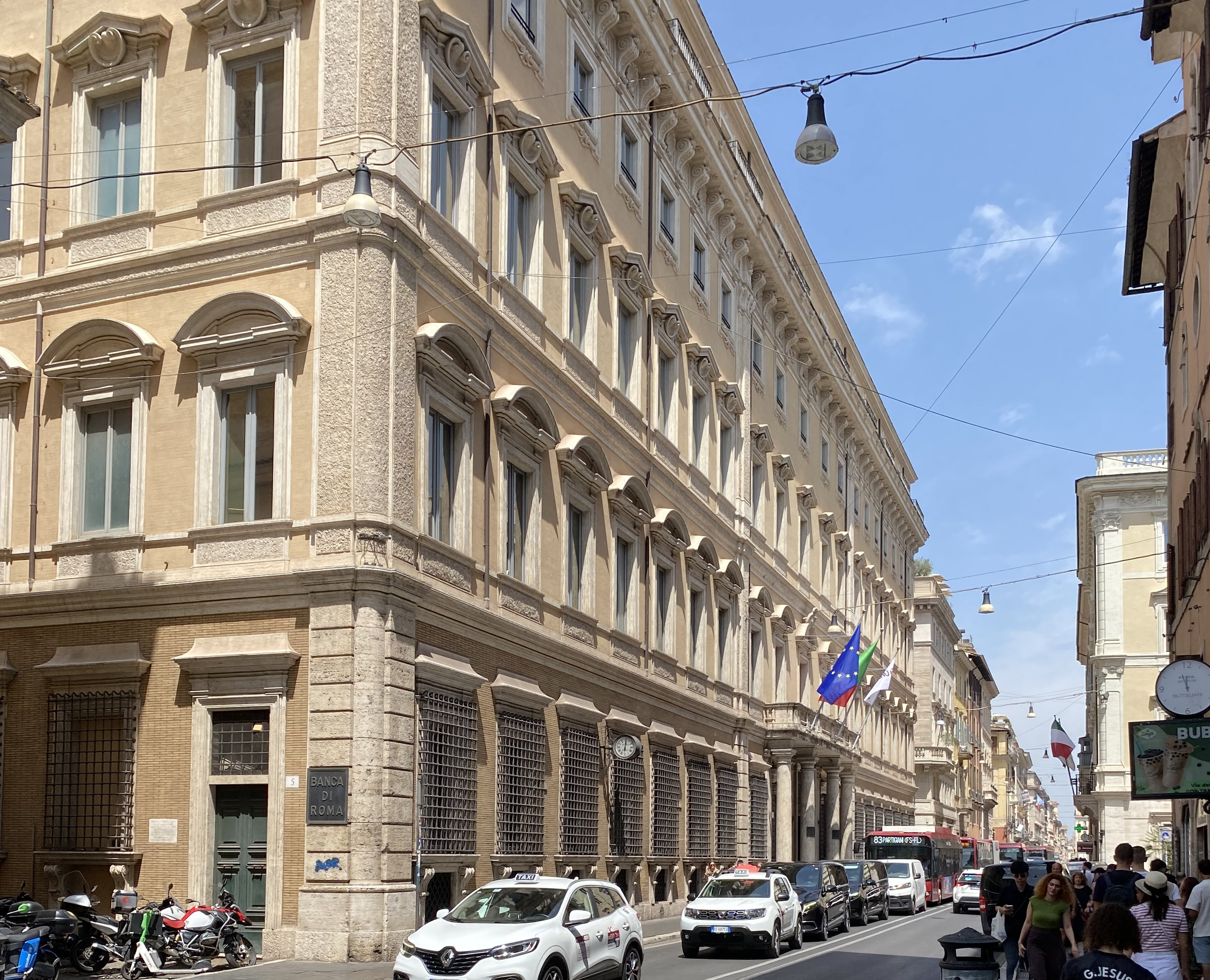
Palazzo De Carolis in central Rome, historic seat of Banco di Roma

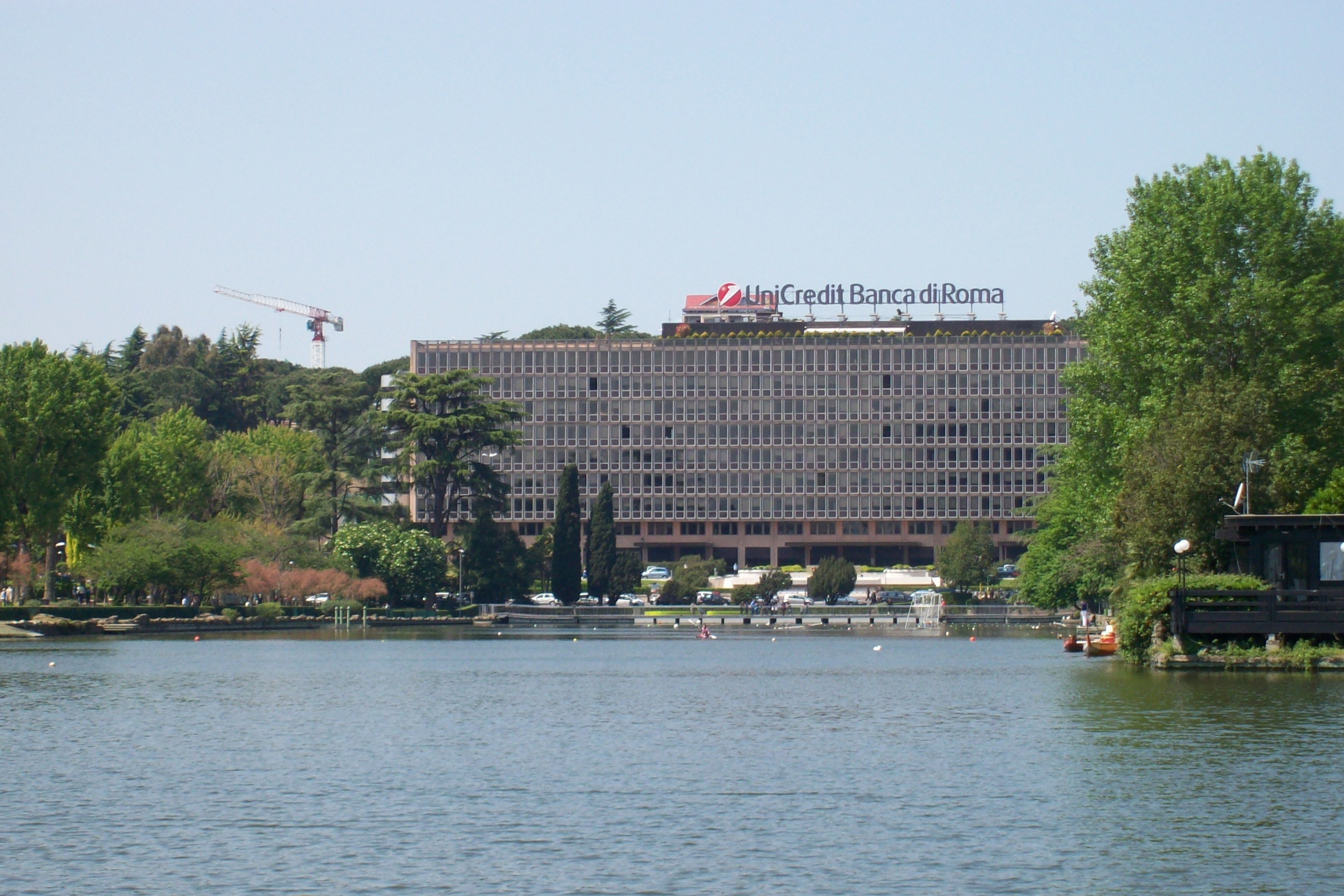
New head office complex in EUR, Rome, Viale Umberto Tupini 180, inaugurated in 1985

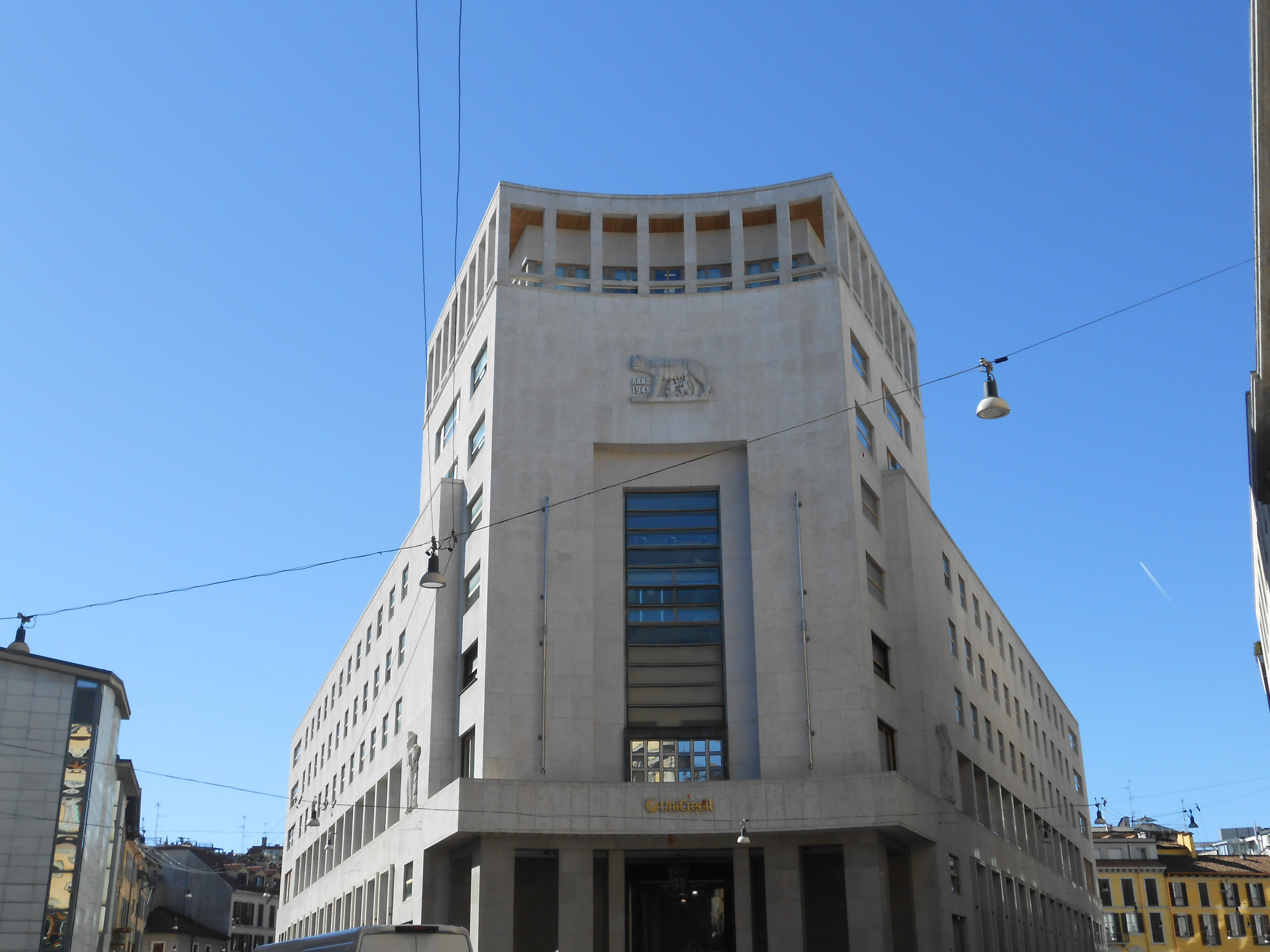
Former branch in Milan

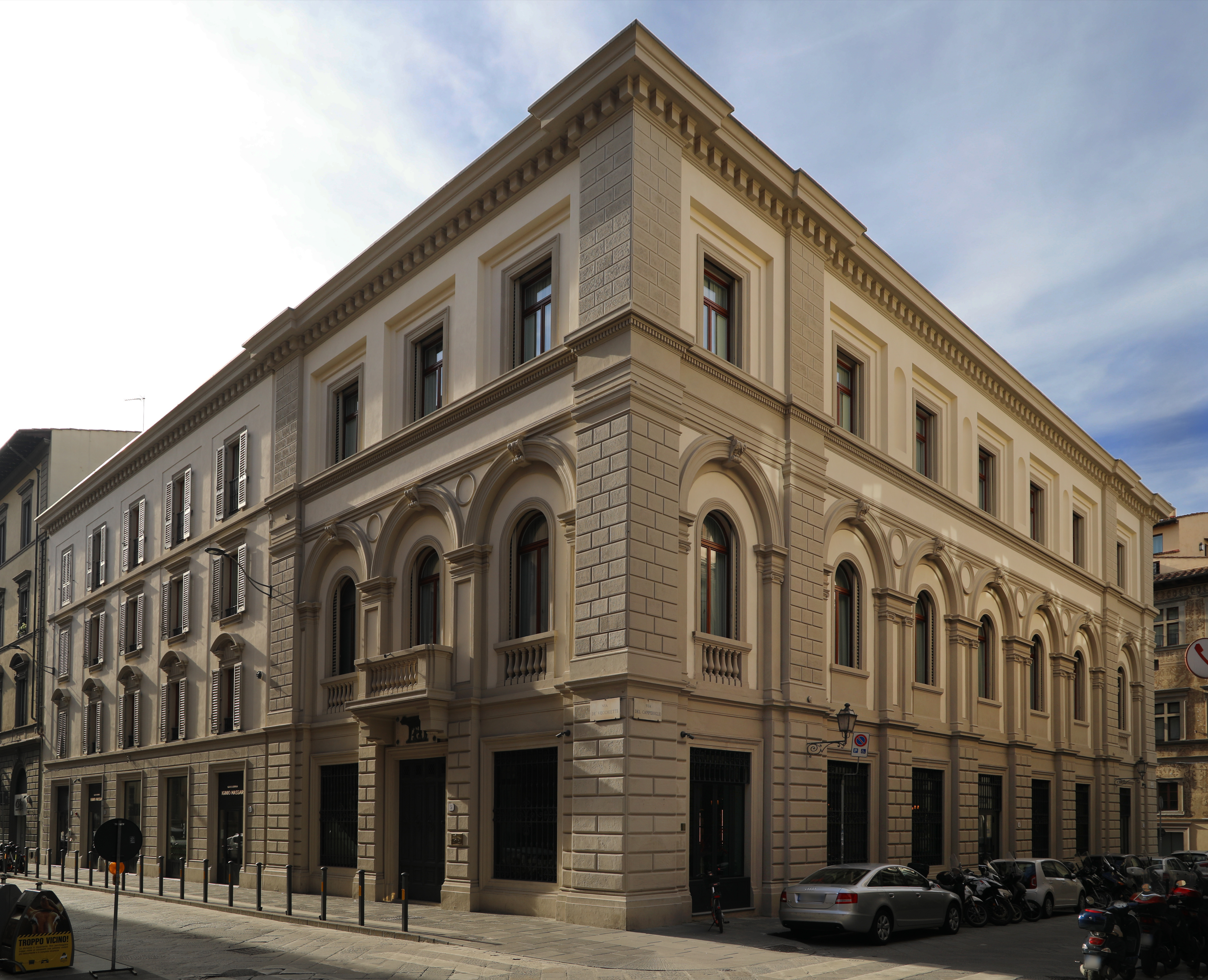
Former branch in Florence

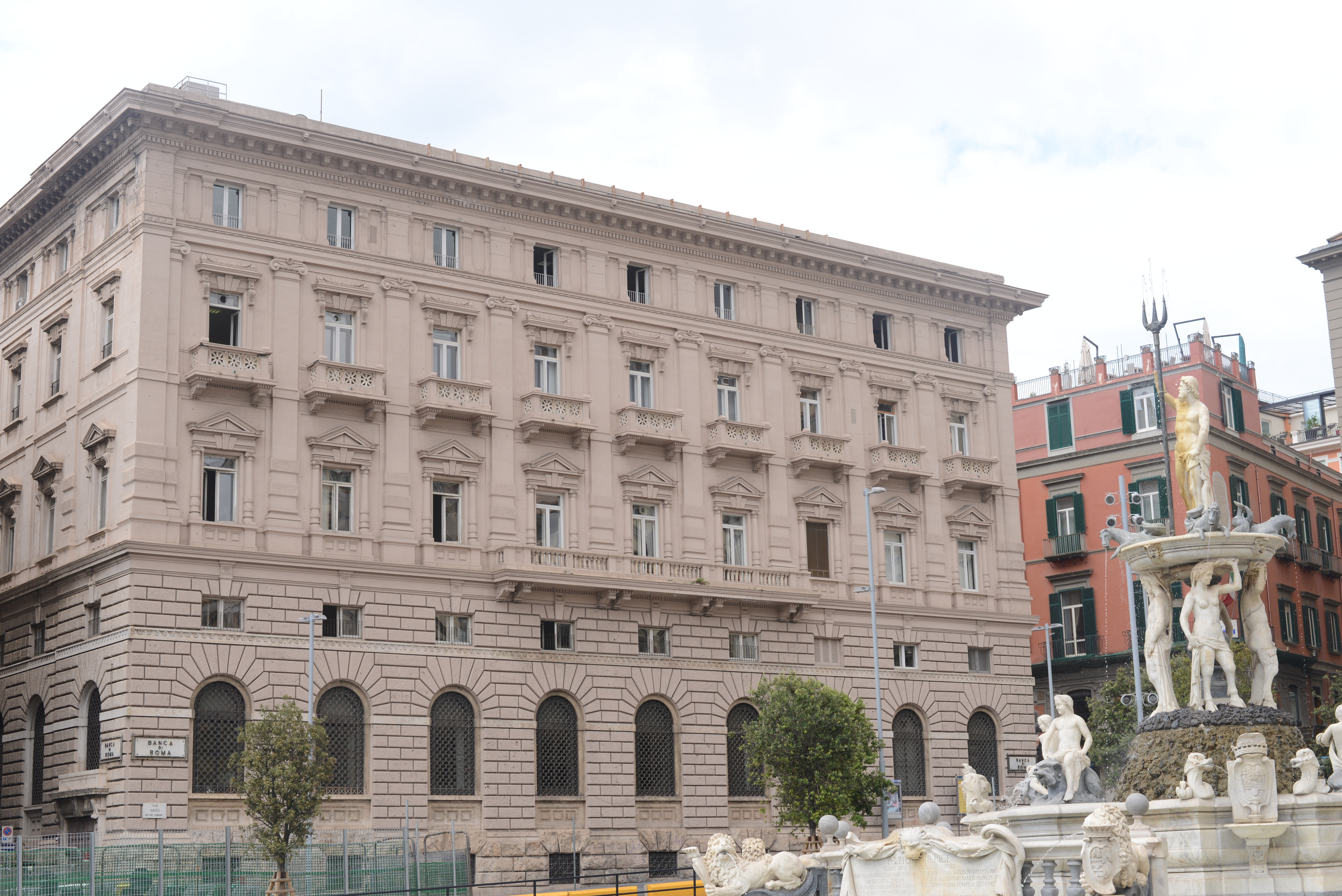
Former branch in Naples

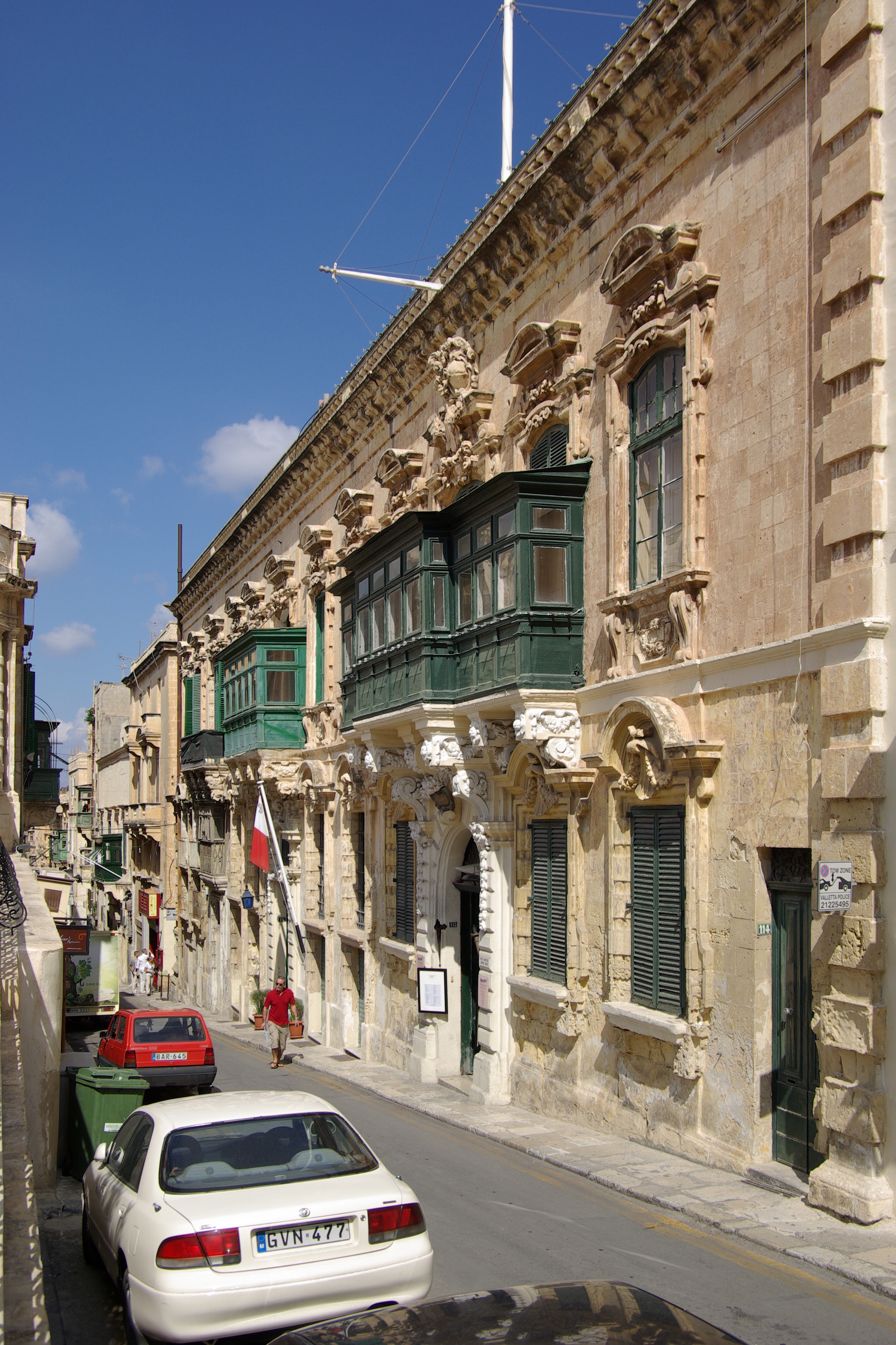
Hostel de Verdelin, former seat of the bank in Malta

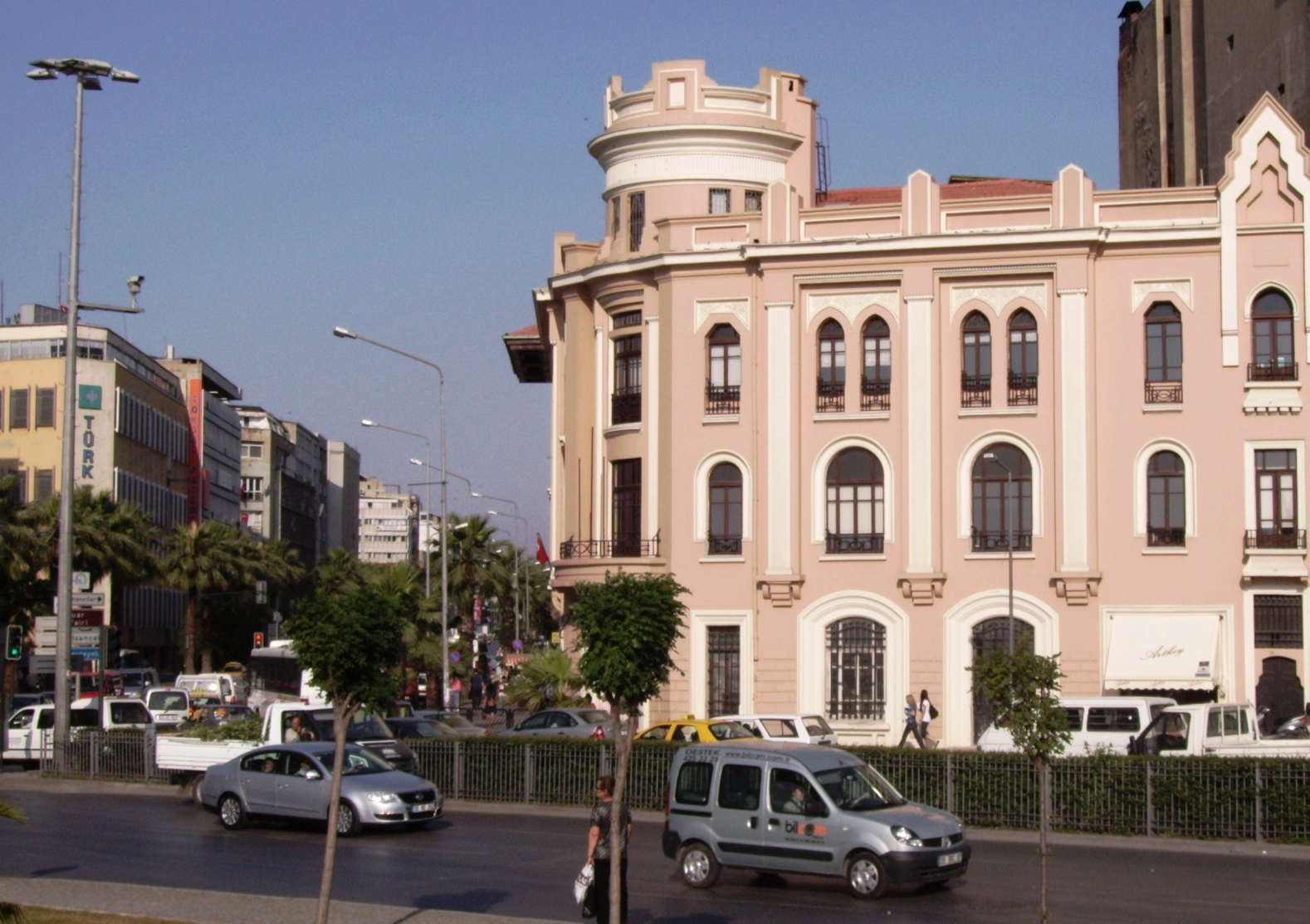
Former branch in İzmir, known as Çatalkaya Hanı

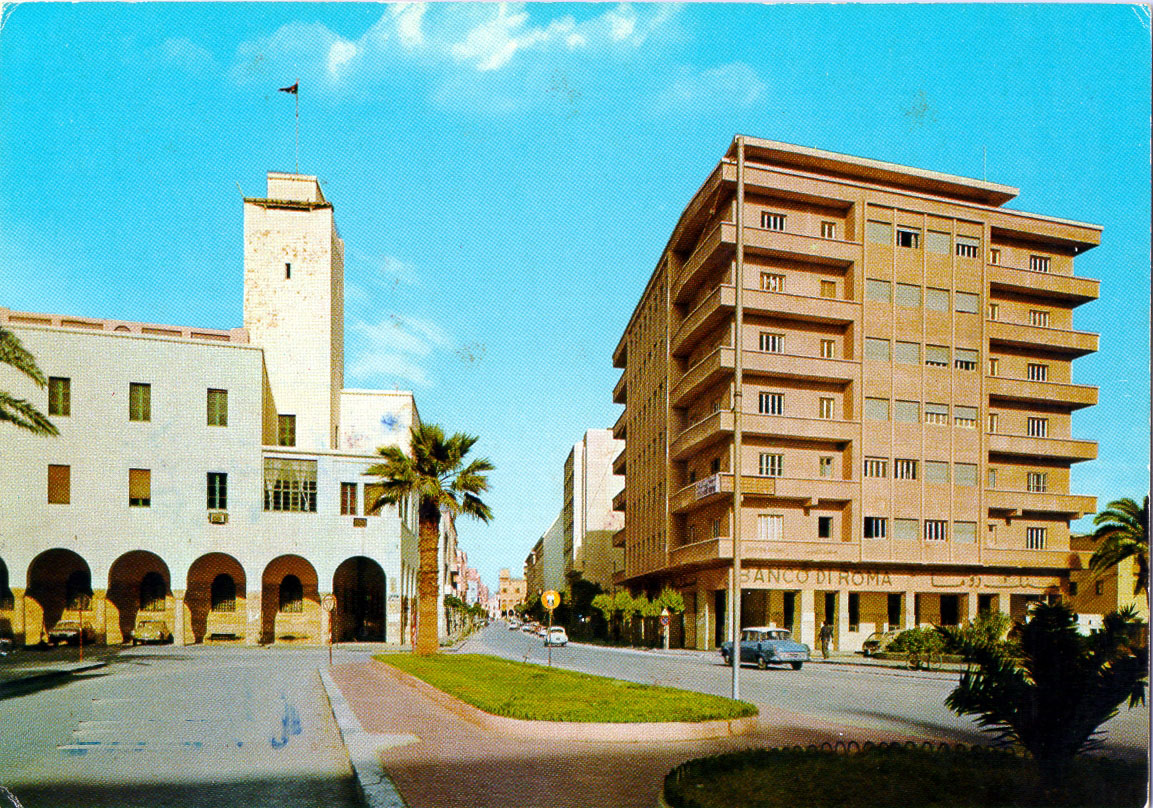
Branch in Benghazi (right) in 1968

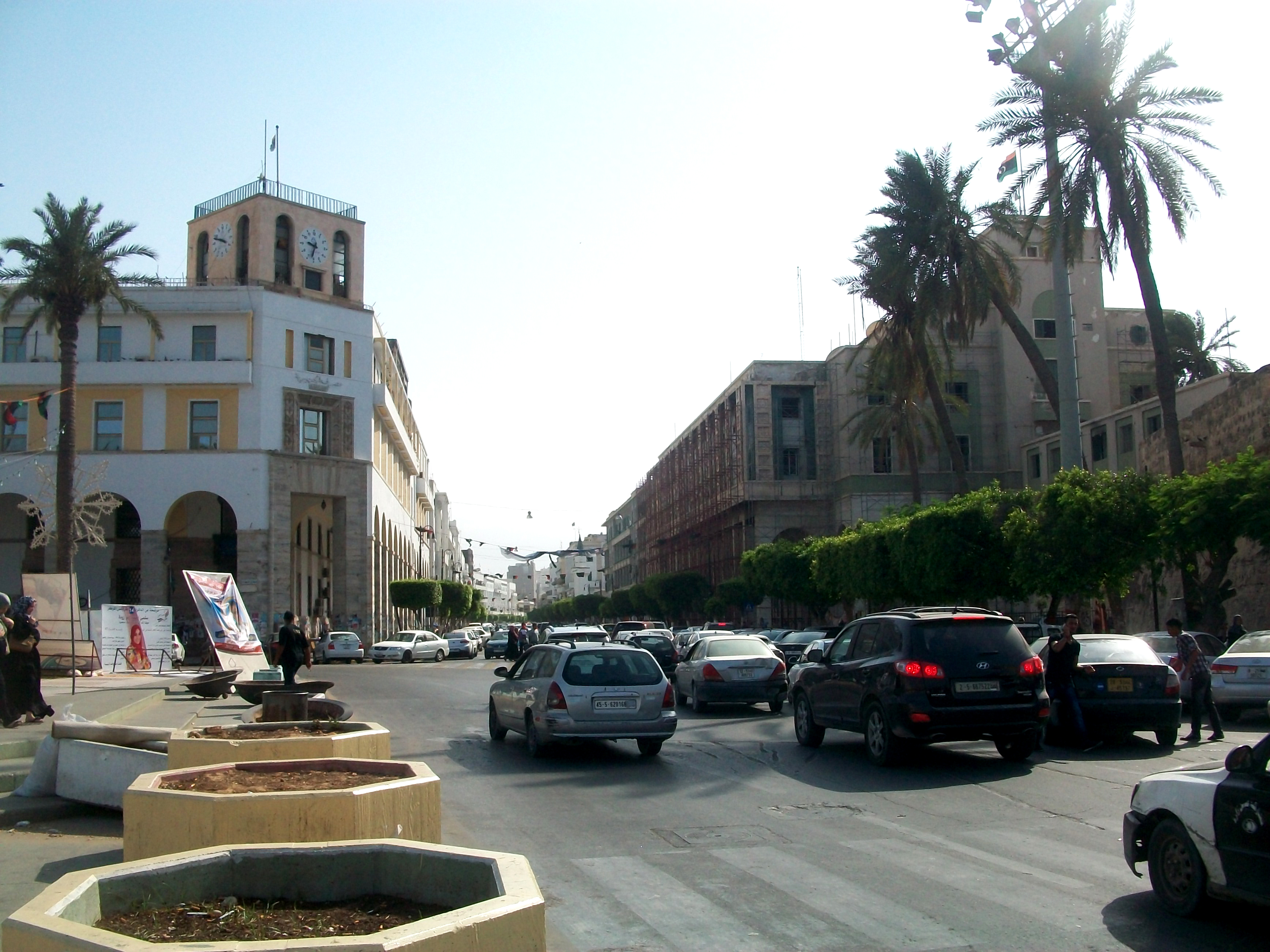
Former branch in Tripoli, Libya (left)

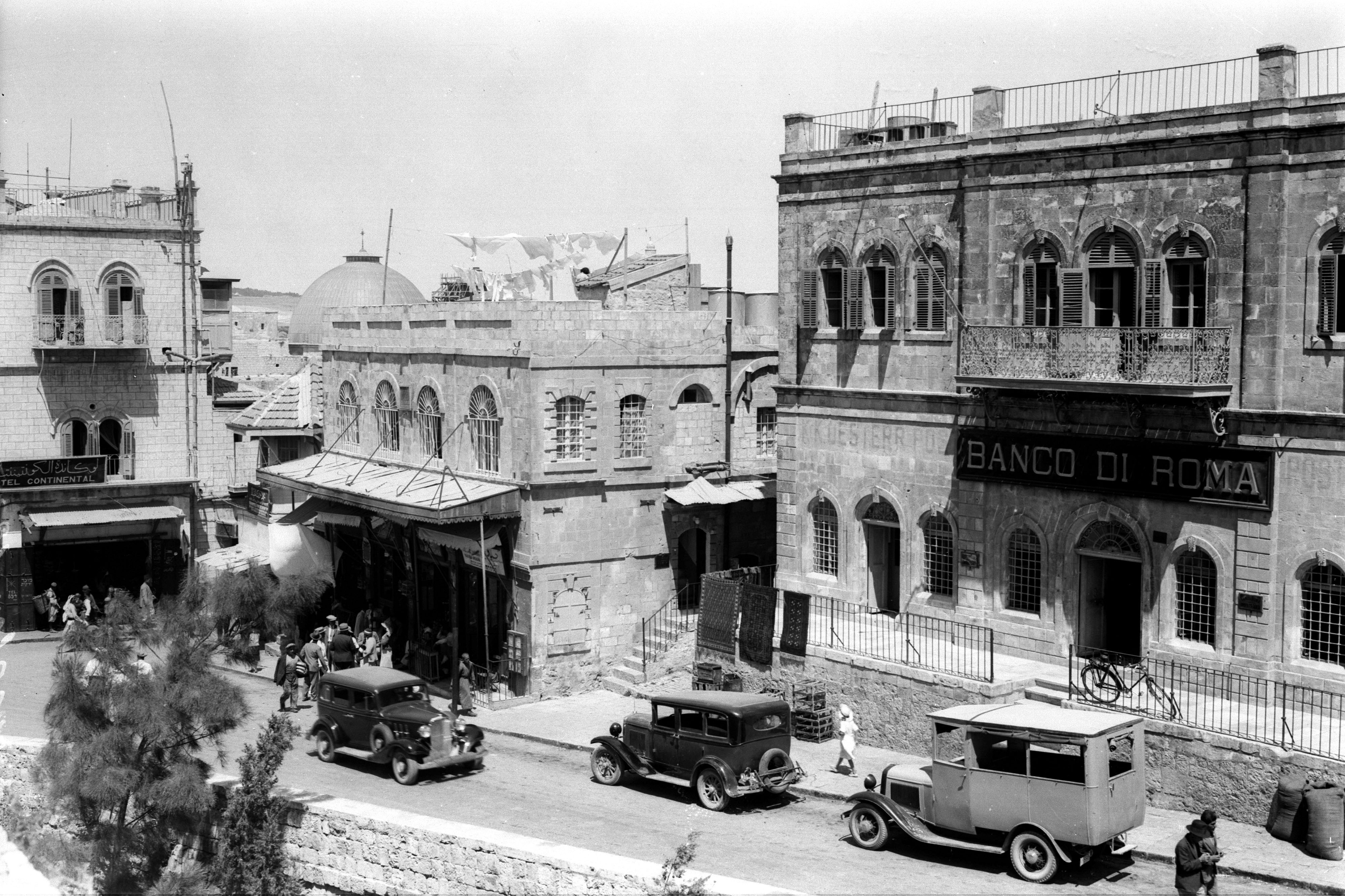
Branch in Jerusalem (right) in 1935

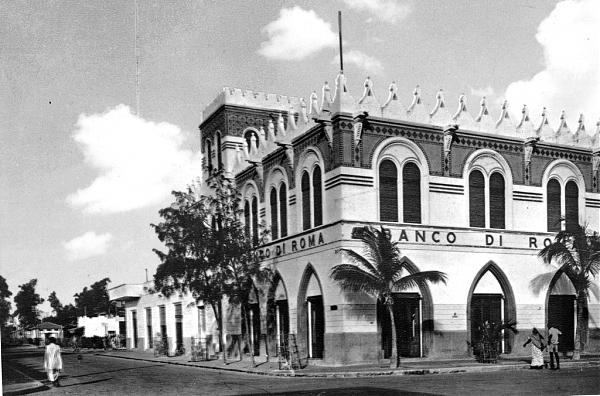
Branch in Mogadishu in 1950

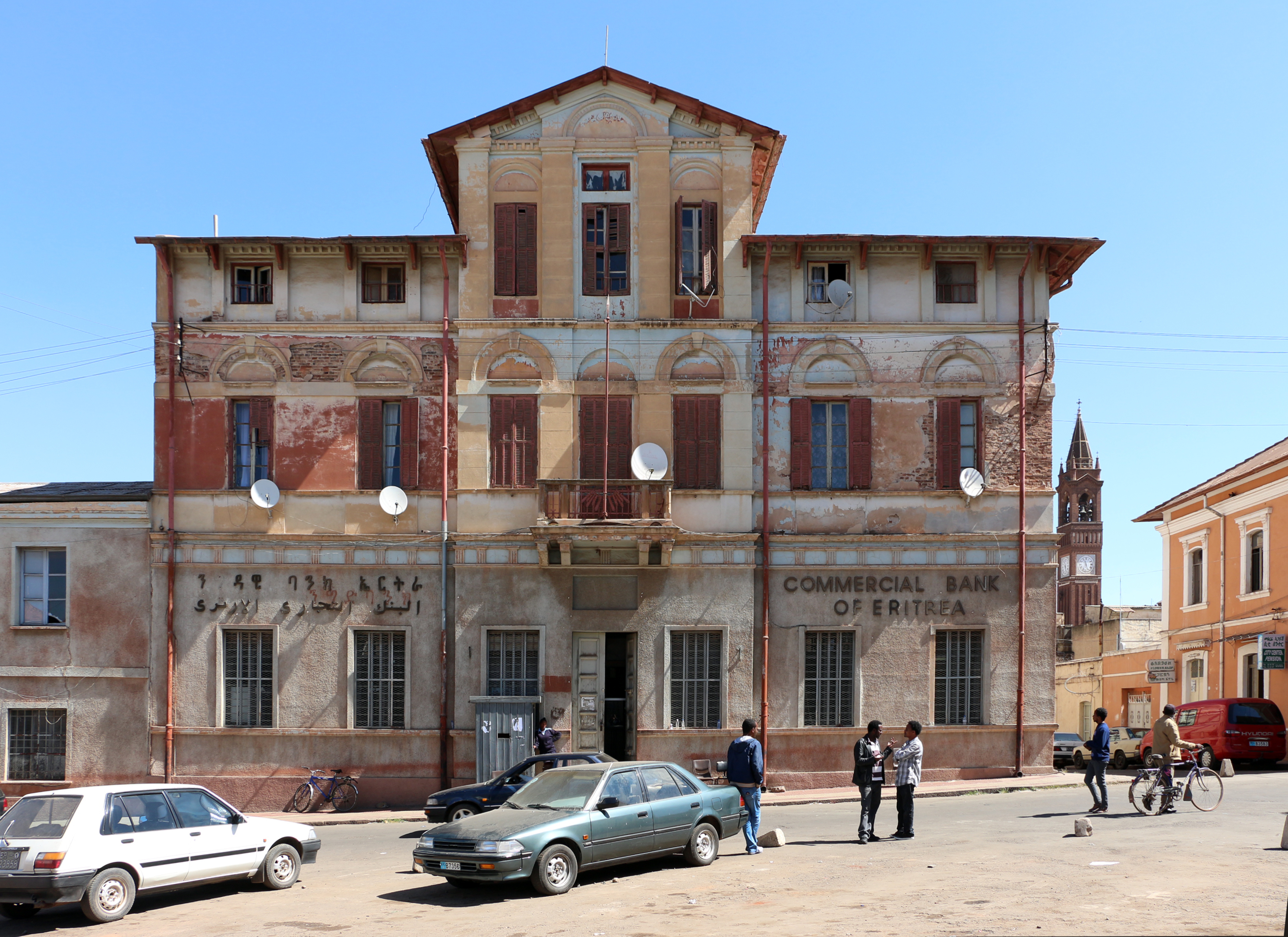
Former branch in Asmara

== See also ==
- List of banks in Italy
