= Wefri Warsay Yika'alo =

Project that intended for development of Eritrea

The Wefri Warsay Yika'alo (WWY) or Warsay Yika'alo Program of Eritrea is an ambitious project of post-war recovery. It is similar to other economic recovery programs and is often compared to the Marshall Plan.^{1, 2, 3}

The program is a series of sponsored investments managed by the Eritrean government in economic, education, health and transportation related infrastructure. These investments are typically made by a mixture of grants and loans from international organizations and from the Government of Eritrea. The transfer of skills is an important component of this program.

Detractors of the program are concerned with the work schedule and conditions of the participants.

== Transportation infrastructure ==
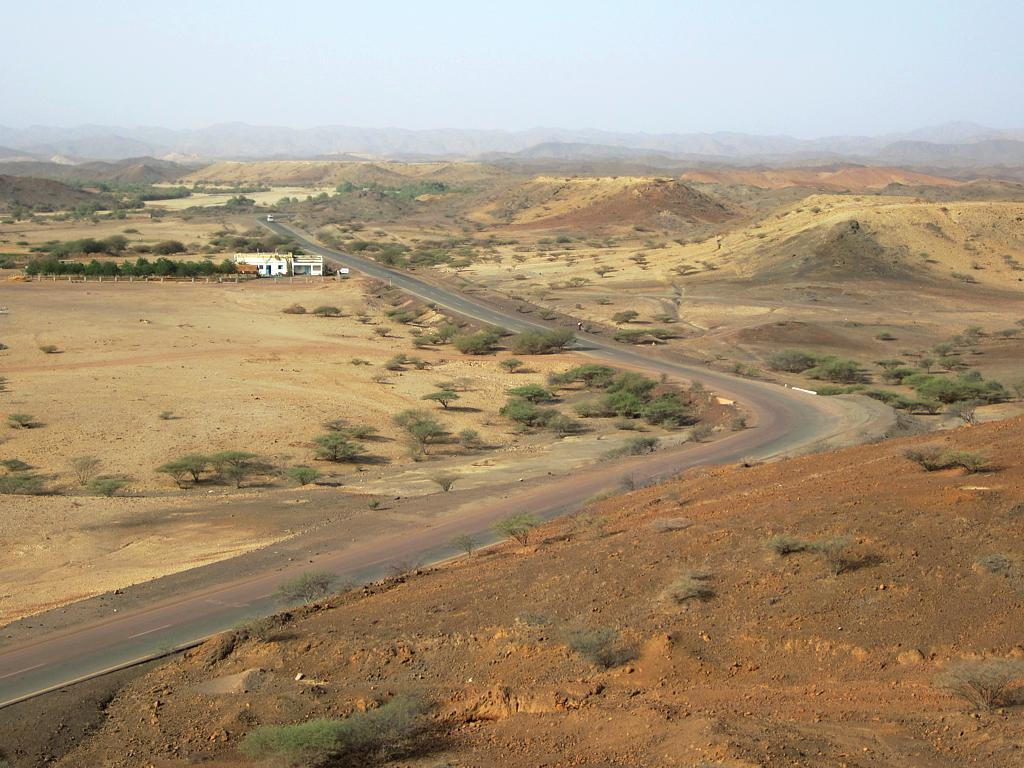
The Massawa-Asmara Highway, built as part of the Wefri Warsay Yika'alo program.

- Asmara-Ghinda-Massawa component of the Eritrean Railway (completed)
- Asmara-Fil fbil-Massawa Highway (completed)
- Asseb-Massawa Highway (under construction)
- Keren-Barentu-Tessenei Highway (under construction)
- Massawa International Airport (completed)
- Sawa Airport (completed)

== Health infrastructure ==
- Assab Regional Referral Hospital (completed)
- Barentu Regional Referral Hospital (completed)
- Dekamhare Regional Hospital (completed)
- Ghinda Regional Referral Hospital (completed)
- Mendefera Regional Referral Hospital(completed)
- Orotta Referral Hospital (completed)

== Education infrastructure ==
- Agricultural School at Hagaz (completed)
- College of Business and Economics at Halhale (completed)
- Hamelmalo Agricultural College (completed)
- Eritrean Institute Of Science and Technology (EIST) at Mai Nefhi (completed)
- Sawa Defence Training Centre (completed)

== Miscellaneous infrastructure ==
- Harena Boat Factory (completed)
- Jetty and Fish Processing Plant at Edd (completed)
- Jetty and Fish Processing Plant at Tio (completed)
- Keren Dam (under construction)
- Mobile phone service under Eri-Tel (completed)

== Notes ==
1. Shaebia - Perverted Reasoning From the Perverted Minds of "Les Enfants Terribles d'Erythree"
2. Encyclopædia Britannica - Eritrea
3. Shabait Commentary - The Year the Eritrean Sun Outshone the Mystics of the Empire
