= Bank of Eritrea =

Monetary authority of Eritrea

Bank of Eritrea ባንክ ኤርትረ
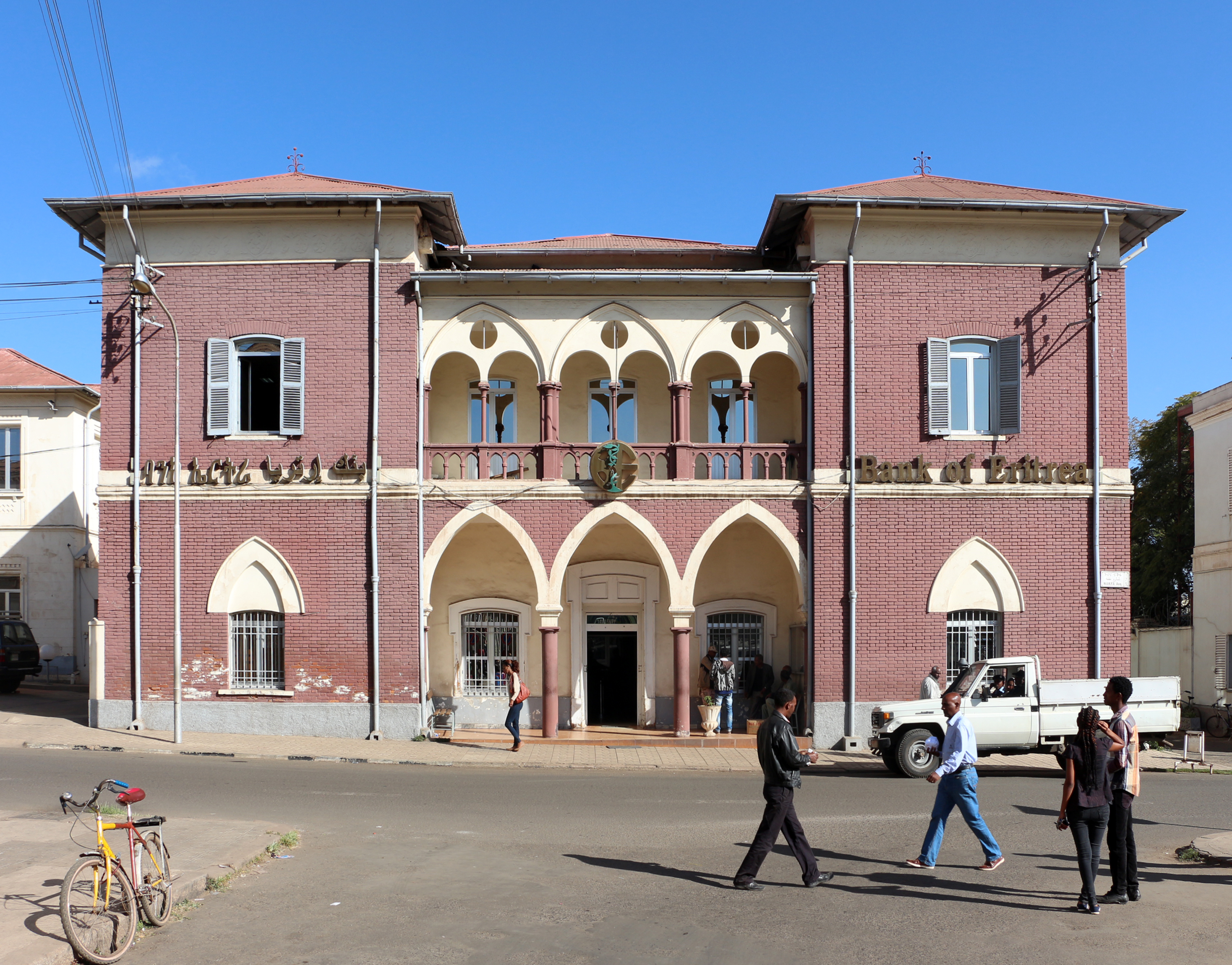
- The Bank of Eritrea Building in Asmara
- Headquarters: Asmara, Maekel, Eritrea
- Established: 1914
- Ownership: 100% state ownership
- Governor: Kibreab Woldemariam
- Central bank of: Eritrea
- Currency: Nakfa; ERN (ISO 4217)
- Website: www.boe.gov.er

The Bank of Eritrea (BOE) is the central bank of Eritrea. The bank is located in Asmara, the capital. The central bank is interested in encouraging foreign investment and in importing capital goods such as industrial machinery and agricultural equipment. The Central Bank of Eritrea, though a government entity, is independent from the Ministry of Finance; its governor and policy committee formulate and implement policy with input from the Ministry of Finance. Although travellers are permitted to bring foreign currency into the country, all transactions are to be made in Nakfa.

== Governors ==
- Andebrhan Welde Giorgis, 1993-1994
- Tekie Beyene, 1994-2003-?
- Kibreab Woldemariam, ca. 2005 -

== See also ==
- Banking in Eritrea
- Central banks and currencies of Africa
- Economy of Eritrea
- Eritrean nakfa, the unit of currency
- List of central banks
