= Economy of Addis Ababa =

Addis Ababa's economy is growing rapidly and become leading among cities in Ethiopia. Over the last two decades, the city shifted to development-oriented programmes and privatization. In late 1990s, the Office for Revision of Addis Ababa's Master Plan (ORAAMP) and National Urban Planning Institute (NUPI) were launched to analyze the economic status of the city. The city covered 29% of Ethiopia's GDP (59.5 Billions $ in 2024) and 20% of national urban development as of 2022.

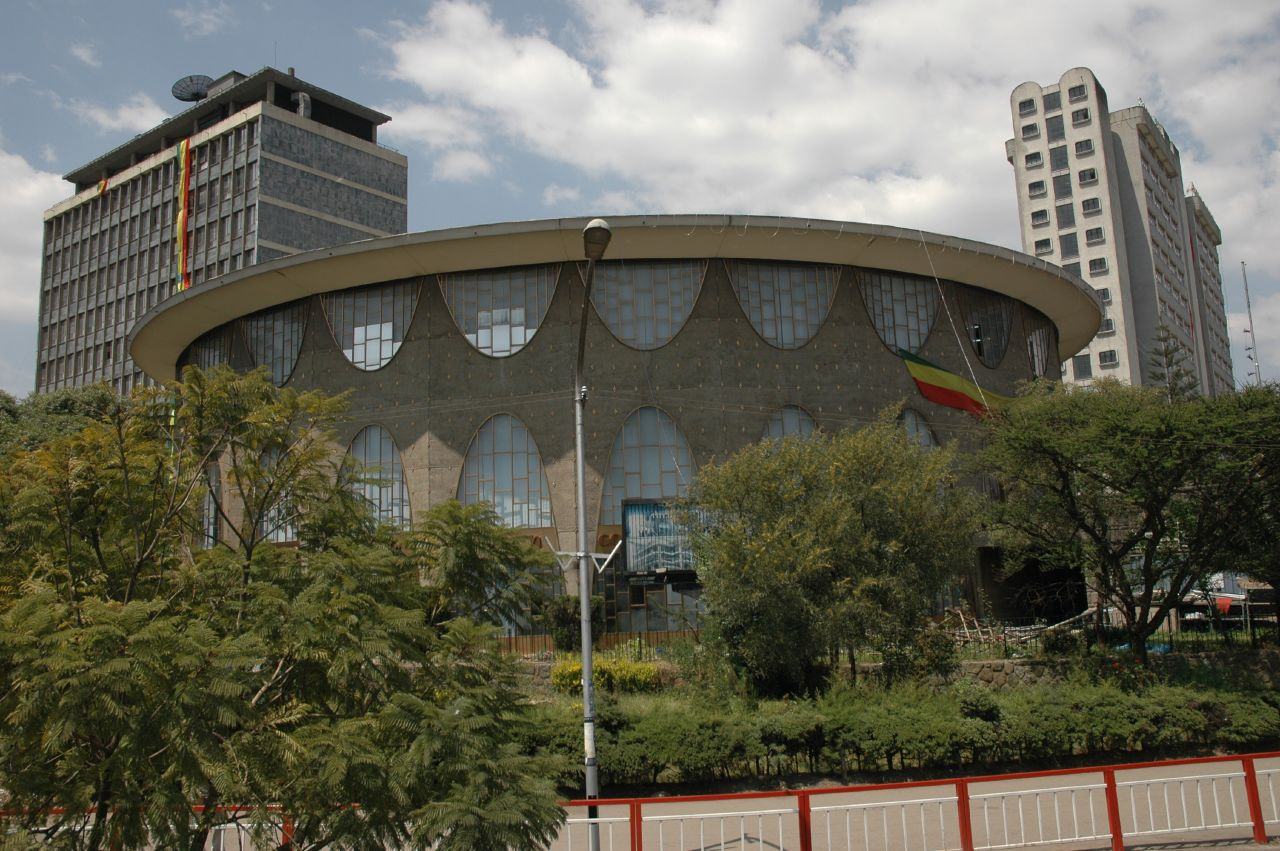
Commercial Bank of Ethiopia in Addis Ababa

Meanwhile, youth unemployment, lack of sufficient infrastructure in transport and poor housing, and sanitation management have appeared as core problems. Addis Ababa has enormous industrial parks that primarily focus on the manufacturing sector.

== General ==
As of 2022, Addis Ababa generates 29% of Ethiopia's urban GDP and 20% of national urban development. Over the last two decades, the city saw rapid socioeconomic changes and physical transformation marked by development-oriented government and the private sector. However, the city has experienced infrastructure, transport, services, youth unemployment and displacement problems.

In 1994, wholesale and retail trade was the leading employer in Addis Ababa closely followed by manufacturing (18.9% and 18.0%, respectively), while public administration stood as a distant third. The high percentage of the "private household with employed persons" sector for Addis Ababa reflects the highest share of domestic workers in the city. In February 2015, Addis Ababa invited a team of specialists from the World Bank Group to implement the CityStrength Diagnostic to collaborate with local officials, technical staff, and stakeholders.

According to official statistics from the federal government, some 119,197 people in the city are engaged in trade and commerce; 113,977 in manufacturing and industry; 80,391 homemakers of a different variety; 71,186 in civil administration; 50,538 in transport and communication; 42,514 in education, health and social services; 32,685 in hotel and catering services; and 16,602 in agriculture.

== Sanitation and infrastructure ==
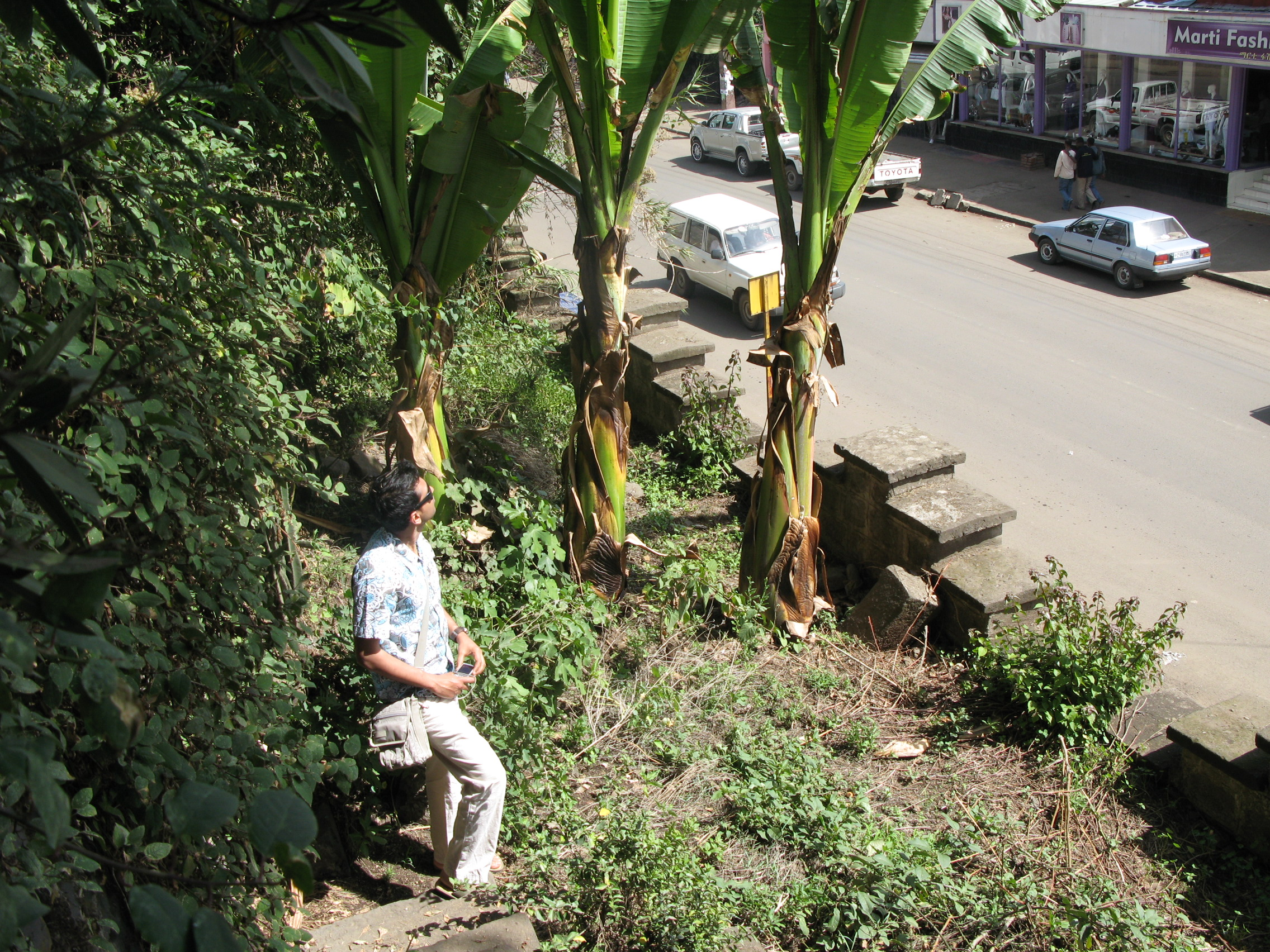
Urban agriculture in Addis Ababa with ecosan products

Around 70–80% of Addis Ababa housing stock filled with congestion and lacks services and sanitation facilities. The government has constructed more than 270,000 housing units since 2005 despite unaffordable for poorest communities. There are also flooding, landslides and fire hazards that can affect the housing quality in some areas. Overall, the city experienced rapid population growth, with density of built spaces, infrastructure development and restructuring of industrial areas in the peripheral part of the city. In 2003 and 2006, the city used different components of urban green infrastructure (UGI) during the last two structural plan revision periods. In 2006, the Integrated Development Program (IHDP) showed the housing shortage within populated area of Ethiopia, 450,000 were found in Addis Ababa alone.

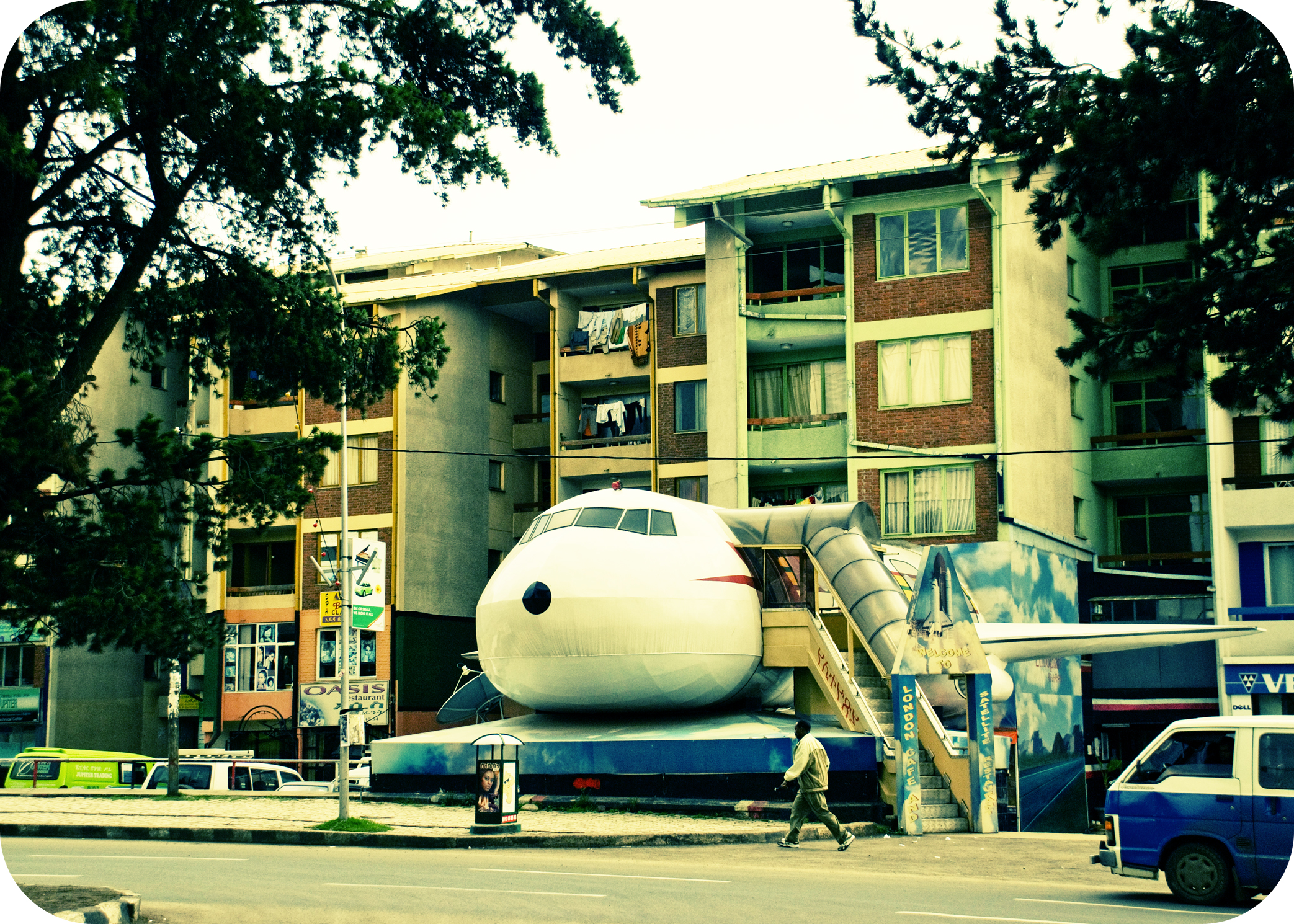
Condominium complex pictured in 2008

The city administration also introduced condominium housing program to revitalize housing deficient for every residents. 37.92% housing units are rental houses owned and administered by the government and regions. 25% of the housing stock is informal settlement. As of 2006, Addis Ababa's housing stock under private ownership was 42% compared to other urban cities, which were 35%.

Sanitation still remains poor in Addis Ababa and water supply feeds from river reservoirs and groundwater, notably the Gefersa, Legedadi and Dire and Akaki wellfields respectively. 44% of population use clean water while 30% are connected with sewage services.

During Abiy Ahmed's premiership, Addis Ababa and its vicinities underwent Beautifying Sheger. This project is aimed to enhance the green coverage and beauty of the city. In 2018, Abiy initiated a project called "Riverside" planned to expand riverbanks for 56 kilometres (35 mi), from the Entoto Mountains to the Akaki river.

== Traffic ==
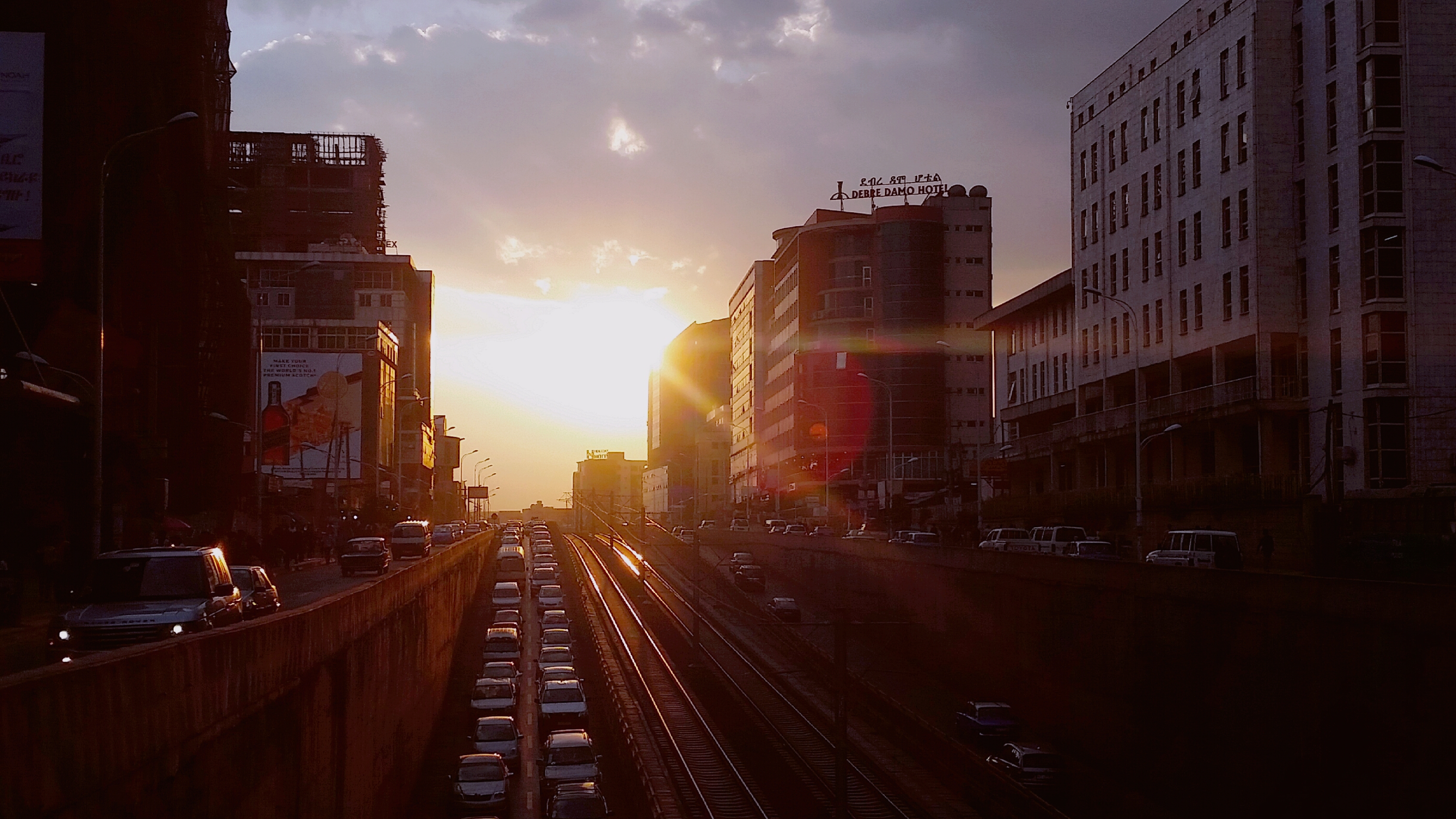
Traffic jam at sunset

In recent years, Addis Ababa's urban environment has rapidly grown. For example, the traffic sector shows an improvement with expansion of accommodate cars despite there are problems with pedestrians. Accidents involving fatalities and pollutions can be addressed by the Addis Ababa Road and Transport Bureau (AARTB). The AARTB proposed a ten-year non-motorized transport (NMT) strategy to create a better urban environment. 85% of travels are by walking, cycling and public transport, while 15% is by private car. However, the transport recently focused more in personal cars rather than the rest modes.

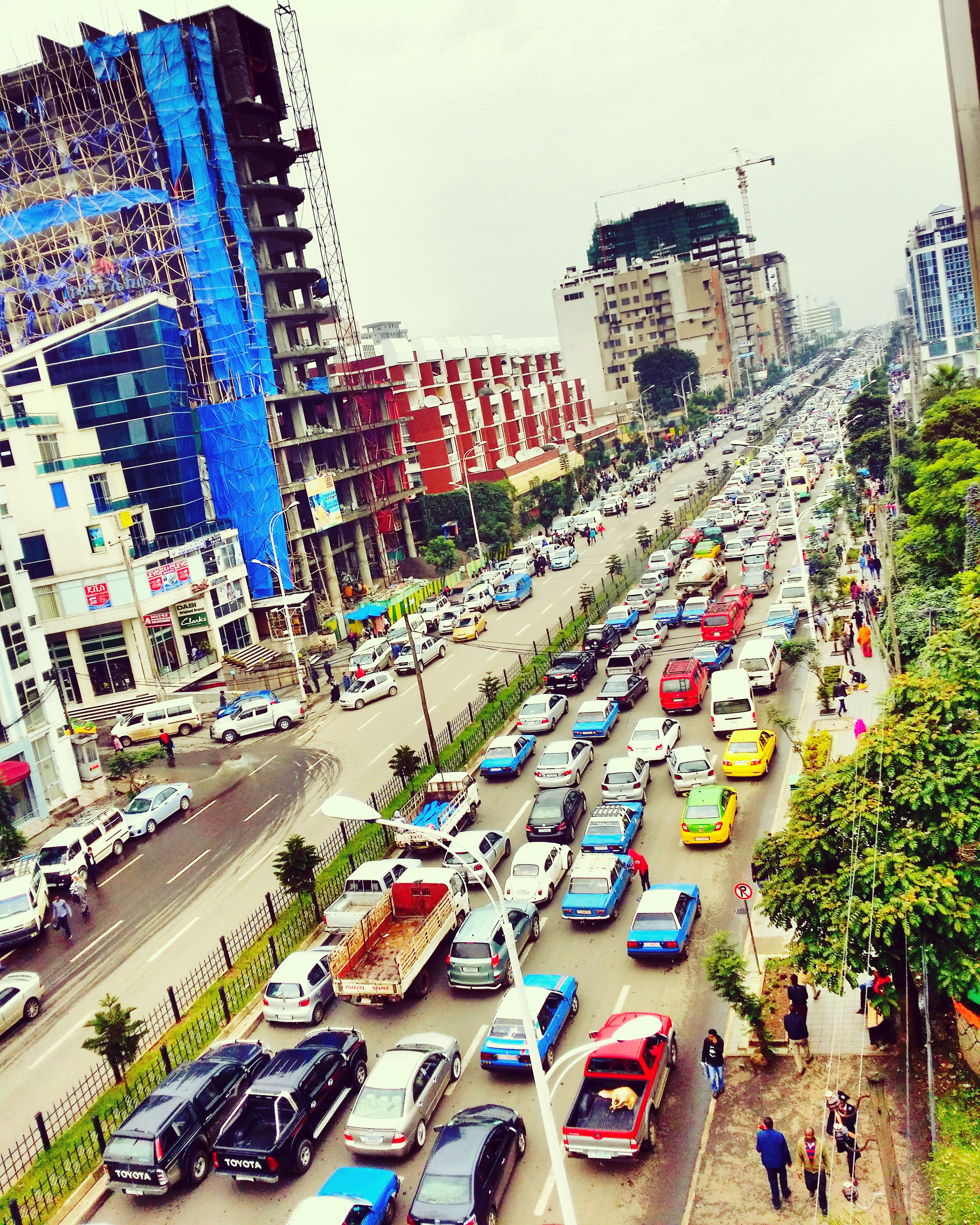
Traffic jam in Bole road

Large investments are made in new infrastructure, including roads, the Light Rail, Bus Rapid Transit system (BRT), and improved standard and practices for integrating pedestrian facilities in major transport capital projects. The city also offers investment to road asset stock, with 26% of its capital investment budget dedicated to public transport. However, these investment reforms less affected economic and mobility value for than resident than the planners envision.

== Industry ==
Since its foundation, Addis Ababa has become home to many industries; food factories such as flour mills, bakeries, alcohol distilleries as well as printing press commenced in Addis Ababa in the 1890s. By the first decade of the 20th century, industrial activities became operational. A minting machine was installed in the Ghibi in 1903. Food factories consisted of some bakeries, two oil mills (1906 and 1912) and several flour mills were opened.

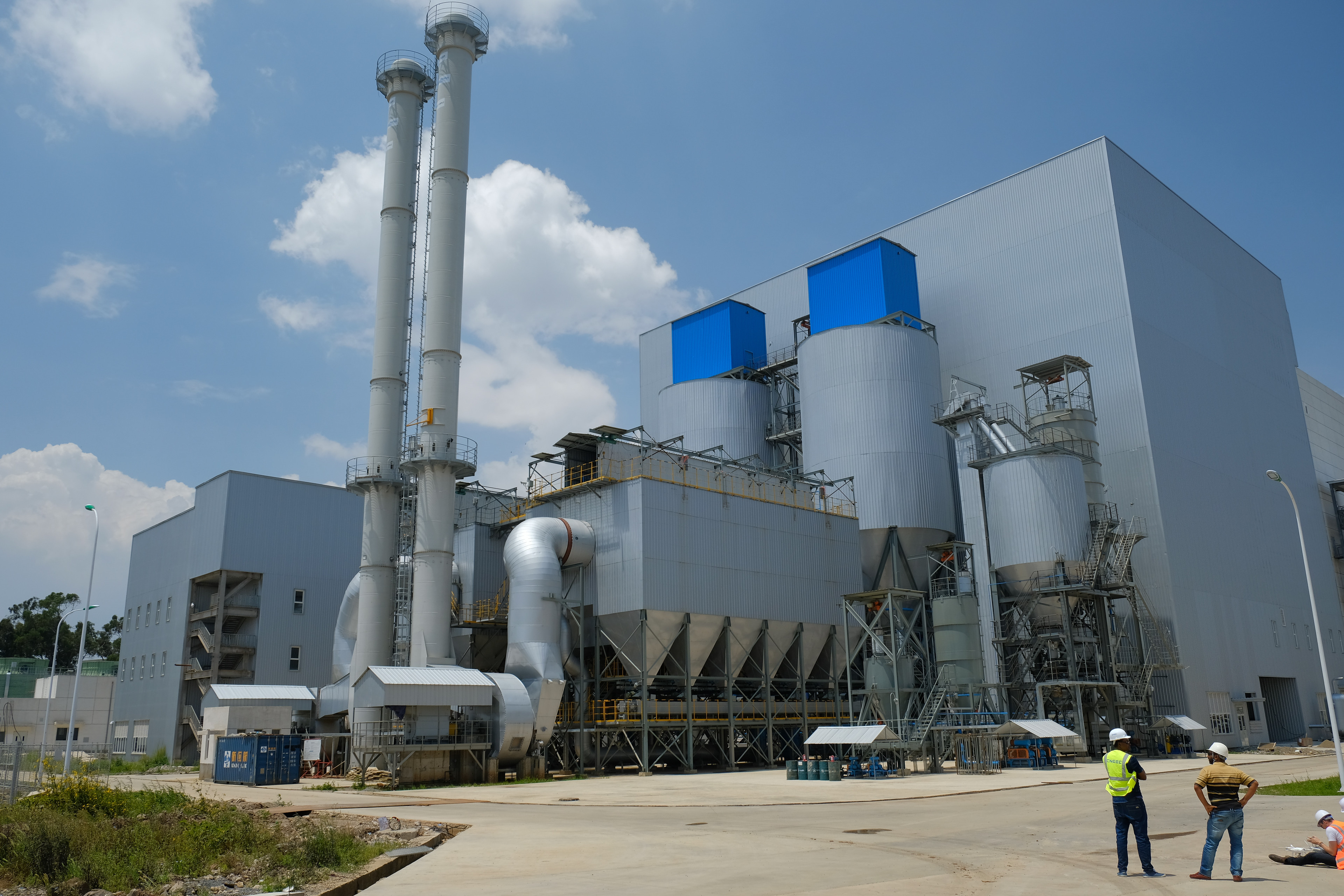
Reppie Waste-to-Energy Facility in Addis Ababa

Addis Ababa has numerous industrial parks. Among them is Lemi Bole Industrial Park. It is located in the City Administration. The park contains 20 factory sheds with total land area about 172 hectares to produce garments. The park also developed sheds and service space on 181 hectares to make perils and textiles. The other one is Koleto Industrial Park, also located in City Administration. 279 hectares of the park are devoted to the manufacture of pharmaceutical products.
