= Juell =

Juell is a Norwegian surname and given name. Notable people with the name include:

Surname:

- Claus Juell (1902–1979), Norwegian Olympic sailor
- Dagny Juell (1867–1901), Norwegian writer
- Daniel Bremer Juell (1808–1855), Norwegian clergyman and politician
- Didrik Bastian Juell (born 1990), Norwegian freestyle skier
- Fredrik Christian Juell (1831–1910), Norwegian businessperson and politician
- Harald Juell (1894–1980), Norwegian diplomat, ambassador and military officer
- Torolf Juell (1897–1983), Norwegian military officer and judge

Given name:

- Henrik Christian Juell Borchgrevink (1891–1967), Norwegian engineer and politician
- Nils Juell Dybwad (1892–1972), Norwegian barrister
- Rolf Juell Gleditsch (1892–1984), Norwegian painter
- Helly Juell Hansen, Norwegian manufacturer and retailer of clothing and sports equipment
- Daniel Bremer Juell Koren (1858–1948), Norwegian civil servant and politician
- Sigurd Juell Lorentzen (1916–1979), Norwegian judge and civil servant
