= Edna Mall =

Entertainment and shopping mall in Addis Ababa, Ethiopia

- ኤድና ሞል
- Location: Cameroon St, Bole, Addis Ababa, Ethiopia
- Coordinates: 8.99748359205193°N 38.786787588356546°E
- Opened: November 2008
- Closed: December 2021
- Owner: Tekleberhan Ambaye Construction PLC; East Steel PLC (until 2022)

Edna Mall (Amharic: ኤድና ሞል) was an entertainment and shopping mall in Addis Ababa, Ethiopia. It was owned by the Tekleberhan Ambaye Construction PLC (TACON).

In 2021, the Chinese firm East Steel PLC acquired Edna Mall with an 810 million birr purchase after TACON was unable to repay a loan from the Commercial Bank of Ethiopia (CBE) and used the mall as collateral. Subsequently, an auction of the mall was held three times with a 237 million birr bid. In April 2022, the East Steel PLC announced their plans to renovate the mall and gave warning to building tenants with several times as deadlines offered by CBE.

== History ==
Edna Mall was established in November 2008 as an entertainment hub. The mall housed 30 offices and shops as well as restaurants and underground parking garages. It also hosted Matti Cinema, Bob and Bongo's Fun Palace. The mall was owned by Tekleberhan Ambaye Construction PLC (TACON).

In 2021, East Steel PLC acquired Edna Mall with an 810 million birr purchase and received an offer of 237 million birr three times at auction. The auction happened after TACON was unable to pay a loan from the Commercial Bank of Ethiopia (CBE) and used the mall as collateral.

In December 2021, the CBE announced a deadline to the mall's tenants for eviction after they failed to comply with the previous order. In April 2022, the East Steel PLC announced their plan to renovate and overhaul the building as a modern mall and warned the former tenants that if they did not leave the premises their stores would be sealed off.
