= Teklewold Atnafu =

Ethiopian politician (born 1963)

- ተክለወልድ አጥናፉ

Governor of National Bank of Ethiopia (NBE)
- In office 2000s – 18 June 2018
- Succeeded by: Yinager Dessie (PhD)

Board chairperson of the Commercial Bank of Ethiopia (CBE)
- Incumbent
- Assumed office 6 February 2020
- Preceded by: Fitsum Assefa

Financial Affairs Advisor of Prime minister
- Incumbent
- Assumed office 2020

Personal details
- Born: 26 October 1963 (age 62) Areka, Ethiopian Empire
- Education: Addis Ababa University

Teklewold Atnafu (Ge'ez: ተክለወልድ አጥናፉ; born on 26 October 1963) is an Ethiopian politician who governed National Bank of Ethiopia for nearly two decades. Teklewold is serving as a board member for the Commercial Bank of Ethiopia since 2020.

== Early life ==
Teklewold was born in Areka, Wolayita, Ethiopia. He completed his primary and secondary school in his hometown and Sodo respectively. He attended Addis Abeba University and studied his first and second degree in Statistics.

== Career ==
Teklewold governed the National Bank of Ethiopia since 2000s to 18 June 2018. He was assigned to head the central bank after serving as a vice governor for a year. He completed his studies in statistics at Addis Abeba University. He did his post-graduate dissertation on building a model for econometric measures of demand and supply of money in Ethiopia. Aby Ahmed appointed him as a chairperson of Commercial Bank of Ethiopia's Board of Management since February 2020 succeeding Fitsum Assefa, the commissioner of the National Planning & Development Commission. He is also a financial affairs sector advisor of the Prime minister.

Since February 12, 2024, Teklewold Atnafu assumed chairmanship of the Board of Management of Development Bank of Ethiopia, another state-owned company with a robust capital base of 39.7 billion Br, second only to the Commercial Bank of Ethiopia (CBE), succeeding Tegegnework Getu (PHD), an alumnus of Addis Abeba and Colombia universities, previously served as Undersecretary General of United Nations General Assembly and administrator of the UNDP.
