= Guy Gibson Campbell =

American physician

- Born: August 6, 1890; Petersburg, Pennsylvania, US
- Died: December 2, 1957 (aged 67); Dyer, Indiana, US
- Burial place: St Joseph Cemetery, Dyer
- Education: Jefferson Medical College, Philadelphia
- Occupation: Medical doctor
- Spouse: Helen Breen Campbell
- Children: 3
- Awards: Commander of the Order of the Star of Ethiopia

Guy Gibson Campbell (August 6, 1890 – December 2, 1957) was an American medical doctor. He served as a medical officer on a US Army transport during the first part of World War I before becoming a medical officer in British North Borneo. In 1932 Campbell returned to the United States to practice privately and five years later was appointed medical director of the Firestone Plantations Company in Liberia. In Liberia he met banker George Blowers; Blowers was later appointed governor of the National Bank of Ethiopia and secured Campbell a position working with the Ethiopian civil service. Campbell served as principal adviser to the Ethiopian Ministry of Health and as personal physician to emperor Haile Selassie and claimed to have greatly expanded medical provision in that country. Campbell left Ethiopia in 1948 and served in South America with the Institute of Inter-American Affairs. In later life he operated a private medical practice in Indiana.

== Early life and career ==
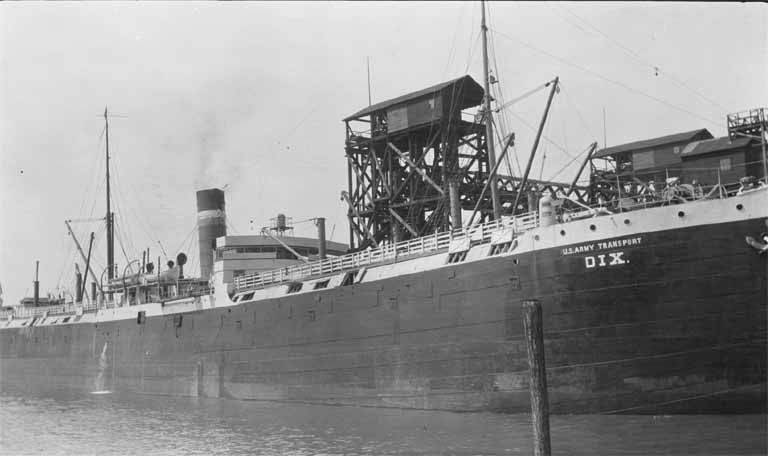
The Dix, circa 1912

Guy Gibson Campbell was born on August 6, 1890, in Petersburg, Pennsylvania. He graduated from Jefferson Medical College, Philadelphia, in 1913 and, during World War I, served as a medical officer on the US Army Transport Dix. From 1916 to 1932 Campbell served as medical officer in British North Borneo where he led campaigns on public health and nutrition and was cited by the colony's government for his work with aborigines. He returned to the United States in 1932 and went into private practice in Wheeler and East Gary, Indiana.

== Africa ==
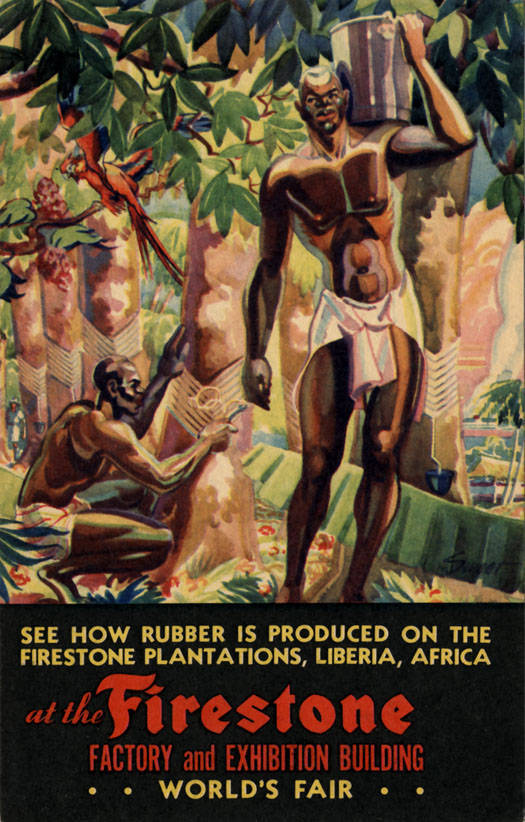
A 1930s poster depicting Firestone rubber collectors in Liberia

Campbell was appointed medical director for the Firestone Plantations Company in Liberia in 1937 and held this position until 1943. In 1947 he was decorated by the Liberian ambassador at the embassy in Washington, DC, for his service. Whilst in Liberia he met George Blowers who was then the general manager of the Bank of Monrovia. Blowers was afterwards appointed governor of the National Bank of Ethiopia and asked Campbell "If I get you a job when I go back to Ethiopia, will you come?". Campbell replied that he would and was appointed to the Ethiopian Ministry of the Interior. He transferred to become principal adviser to the Ethiopian Ministry of Health when it was founded in 1944 and also served as personal physician to the emperor, Haile Selassie.

Campbell claimed to have greatly expanded medical provision in the country, increasing the number of hospitals from 15 to 36 by the end of his tenure in 1948. He claimed a similar increase in the number of beds from 1,200 to 4,000 and in doctors from 40 to 100, attracting recruits from the UK, Sweden, Italy, India and the US. He played a key role in the foundation of the Ethiopian Medical Association (https://www.ethiopianmedicalass.org/) and was its first president. For services to public health he was appointed a commander of the Order of the Star of Ethiopia.

== Return to the Americas ==
In 1948 Campbell was appointed to the staff of the Institute of Inter-American Affairs and served in La Paz, Bolivia; Bogota, Colombia and in Ecuador. He was decorated by Bolivia and Colombia for services to Public Health.

Campbell later returned to private practice in Hammond, Dyer and Munster, Indiana. He lived on Hart Street, Dyer, and was married to Helen Breen Campbell of Dyer. They had two sons, Guy Gibson Jr. (who lived in Miami) and Charles Philip (who lived in Asmara, Eritrea), and one daughter, Mary Helen (who lived in Chicago). Campbell had six grandchildren. He was a member of the American Medical Association, Indiana Medical Society and the Lake County Medical Society. He was also a fellow of the Royal Society of Tropical Medicine and Hygiene and of the American Geriatrics Society. In 1957 he became a member of the Royal Society of Health. Campbell died at the Our Lady of Mercy Hospital in Dyer on December 2, 1957. After a funeral mass at St Joseph Church he was buried in St Joseph Cemetery, Dyer.
