= Beautifying Sheger =

Infrastructure development project in Addis Ababa, Ethiopia (begun 2019)

Beautifying Sheger is a project sponsored by the Ethiopian government that aims to clean rivers and create public works in the capital city, Addis Ababa. It was launched on 27 February 2019 under Prime Minister Abiy Ahmed, and aims to run for three years.

== Goals ==
Beautifying Sheger aims to increase tourism and quality of life, reduce the effects of climate change and to create jobs in the Ethiopian capital city by developing green spaces from Entoto to Akaki waste water treatment plant. The project aims to convince citizens to assist in the cleaning efforts as well, as despite Ethiopia's recent economic development, there has been no environmental action to reduce industrious and urban waste.

== Chinese influence ==
Ethiopia is a member of the Belt and Road Initiative with China in order to gain economic stability and modernization through loans and increased trade. China is Ethiopia's biggest trading partner and investor, importing US$4,960,066,680 into the country in 2022. This is nearly twice the amount imported by India in 2022, at US$2,366,045,290.

Criticism of the BRI points out the fact that China may be using their economic power in the region to gain political power. On 25 April 2019, the Chinese ambassador to Ethiopia, Chinese Premier Li Keqiang, had agreed to fund development for a plaza and 12 kilometres of the project. This came alongside the announcement that China's paramount leader Xi Jinping had adjusted a previous statement on writing off all interest loan debt, stating that the Chinese government aimed to write off "interest free loans matured till end of 2018". However, the Chinese government also promised to extend the maturity period of the $4 billion loan on the Addis Abeba-Djibouti railway- increasing it from ten years to thirty. One of the two companies funding this investment, the China Railway Construction Corporation, have expressed interest in the development of Ethiopian agriculture and oil and gas.

== Dine for Sheger ==
On 19 May 2019, the Ethiopian government held a fundraising dinner at Menelik Palace, which the Prime Minister called "Dine for Sheger". 300 business executives and representatives from international companies attended the event, each paying $173,000 per seat. The project requires an estimated $1 billion, and the dinner raised $25 million, with donors from the United Nations, the Italian government, the African Development Bank, and the Commercial Bank of Ethiopia. On 2 March 2019, Ahmed had tweeted that he had secured the support of Kenyan president, Uhuru Kenyatta, claiming that "He gave his support to the Beautifying Sheger initiative & pledged that Kenyan companies will stand by PM Abiy Ahmed & Ethiopians in the ‘Dine for Sheger’ fundraiser." Donors were offered a plaque with their name on it, which would be placed along the project route, and a private photo-op with Ahmed.

== Project ==
On 1 October 2019, 12 kilometres of the total 56 were funded to be built using $1 billion supplied by the Chinese government through the China Communications Construction Company, which aims to build the segment of road. Aside from the road itself, the venue will feature a recreational space, an artificial lake, and a wedding venue—all in front of the Sheraton Addis hotel.

Its construction was expected to be complete in May 2020.

== Gallery ==
Pictures from event
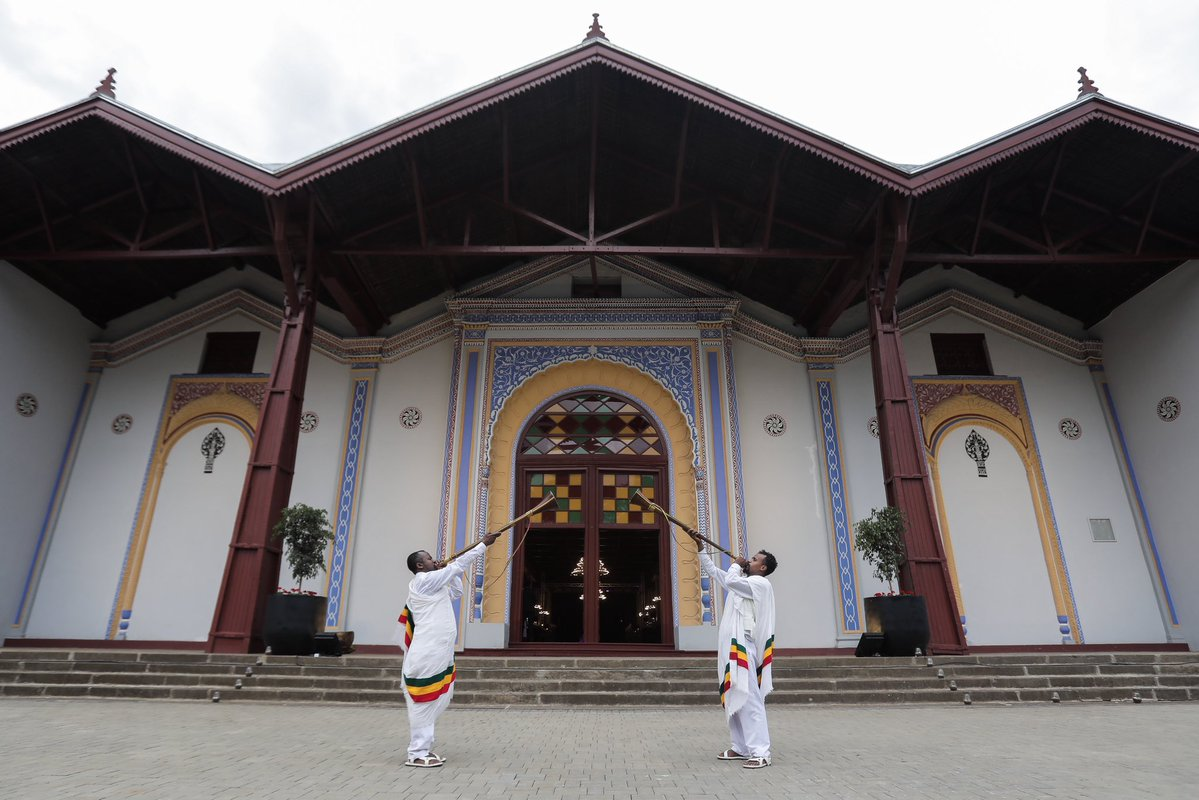
Trumpets outside the gate of Menelik Palace.

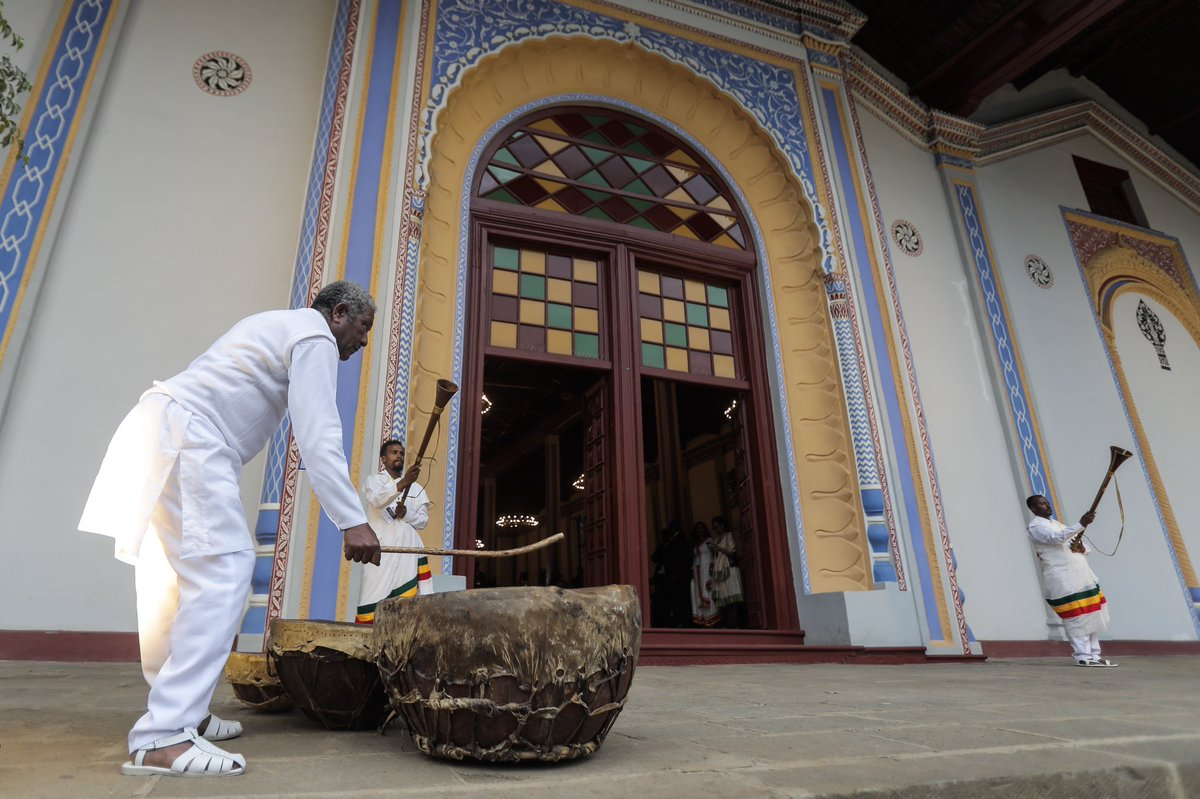
Traditional Ethiopian musicians playing their instruments outside the palace.

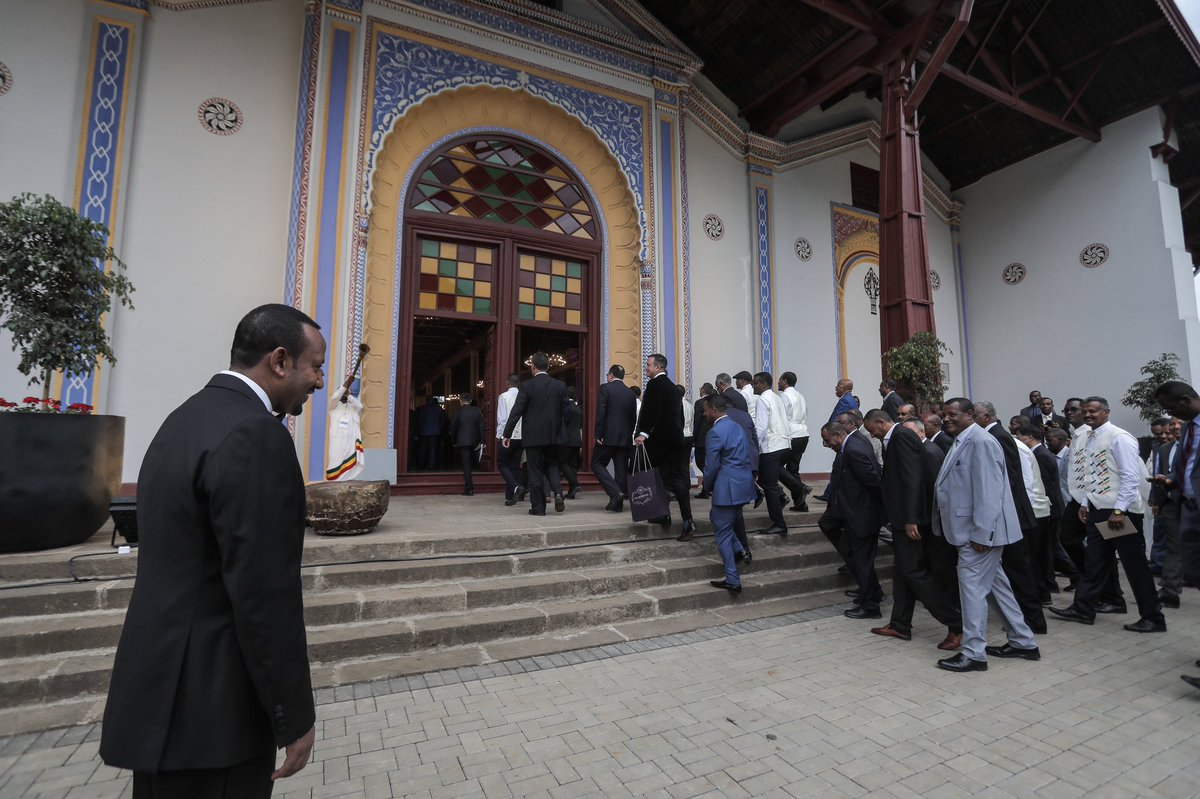
Diners entering the palace.

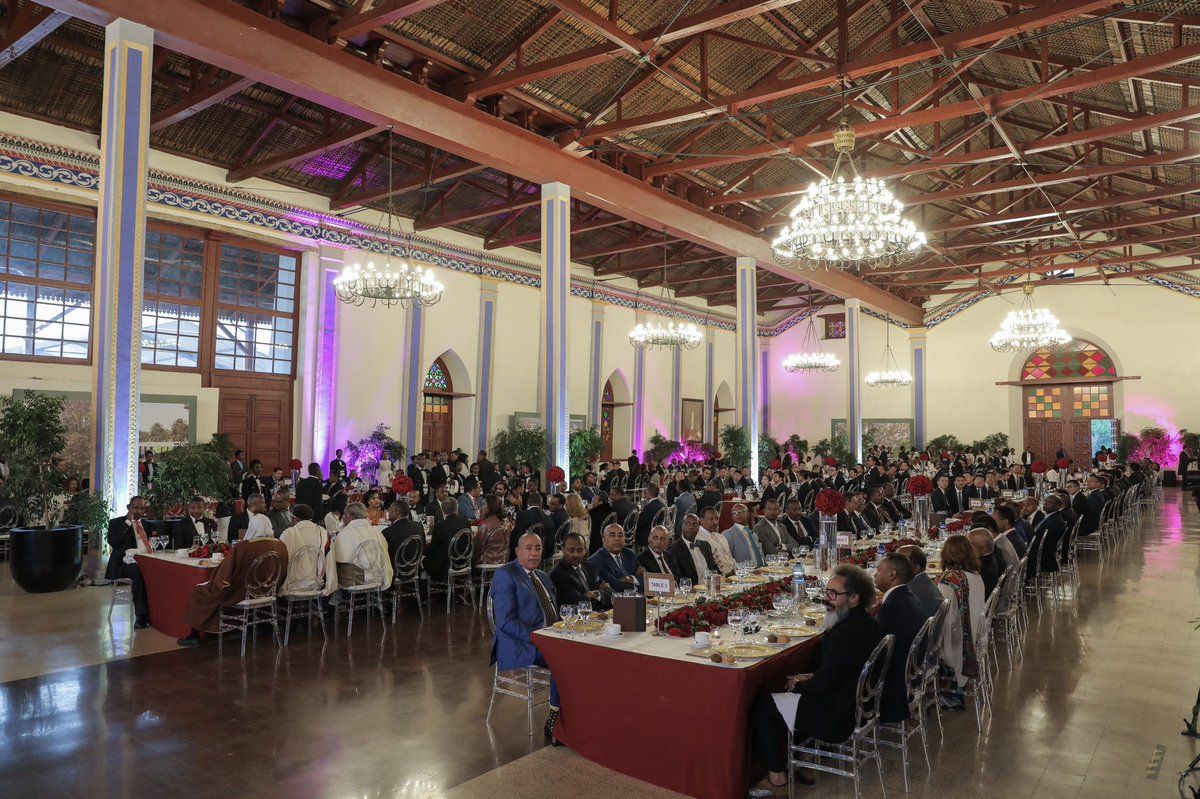
Diners sitting down.
