= Abe Sano =

Ethiopian banker

President of the Commercial Bank of Ethiopia
- Incumbent
- Assumed office 4 March 2020
- Prime Minister: Abiy Ahmed
- Preceded by: Bacha Gina
- In office 2006–2008

President of Oromia International Bank
- In office 7 January 2008 – 4 March 2020
- Prime Minister: Abiy Ahmed
- Succeeded by: Teferi Mekonnen

Personal details
- Education: Addis Ababa University (B.A.); University of London (MBA)
- Occupation: Banker

Abe Sano (Amharic: አቤ ሳኖ) is an Ethiopian banker who is appointed as the president of the Commercial Bank of Ethiopia (CBE) since 2020. He was the president of Oromia International Bank (now Oromia Bank) from 2008.

== Education and career ==
Abe Sano holds bachelor's degree in accounting from Addis Ababa University and a Master's in Business Administration from the University of London. He began his career as the president of the Commercial Bank of Ethiopia (CBE) from 2006 to 2008. In January 2008, he became the President of Oromia International Bank (now Oromia Bank) where he contributed to offer free interest service in 2013.

On 4 March 2020, he reelected as the president of CBE replaced Bacha Gina.
