= Guy Campbell =

Guy Campbell may refer to:

- Sir Guy Campbell, 1st Baronet (1786–1849), British major-general
- Guy Edgar Campbell (1871–1940), US Representative from Pennsylvania
- Sir Guy Campbell, 5th Baronet (1910–1993), British colonel
- Guy Gibson Campbell (1890–1957), American medical doctor
