= Mamo Mihretu =

Ethiopian economist and lawyer

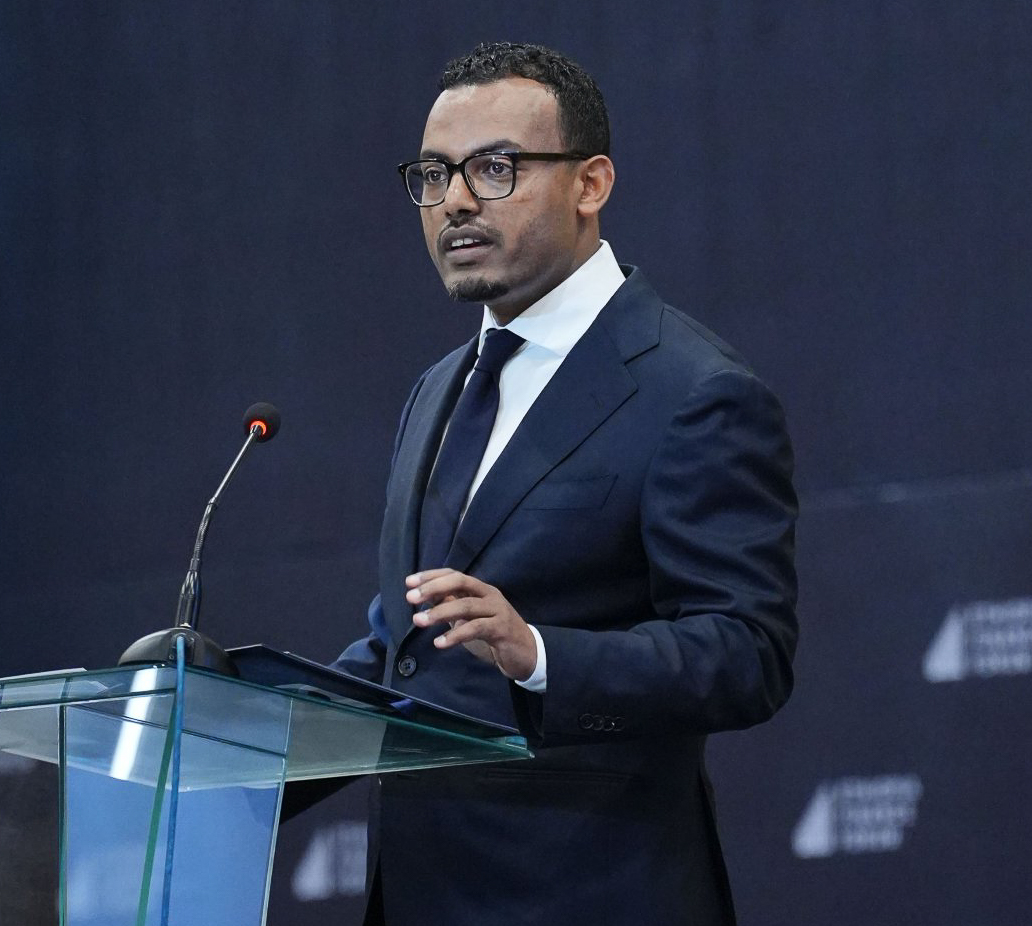

Governor of the National Bank of Ethiopia
- In office 20 January 2023 – 3 September 2025
- Appointed by: Abiy Ahmed
- Preceded by: Yinager Dessie
- Succeeded by: Eyob Tekalign

Senior Private Sector Specialist at the World Bank Group
- In office 2010–2018

Personal details
- Education: Addis Ababa University (LLB); University of Amsterdam; Harvard Kennedy School (MPA)
- Occupation: Banker; lawyer

Mamo Esmelealem Mihretu (Amharic: ማሞ እስመላለም ምህረቱ) is an Ethiopian lawyer and policymaker who served as the 10th Governor of the National Bank of Ethiopia (NBE) from January 2023 to September 2025.

Prior to his appointment as central bank governor, Mihretu served as a senior policy advisor to the Prime Minister and led the Ethiopian Investment Holdings, the country’s sovereign wealth fund.

Mihretu resigned as Governor on 3 September 2025.

== Life and education ==
Mamo Mihretu holds a degree in law from Addis Ababa University, a Master of Public Administration from the Kennedy School of Government at Harvard University, an LLM in Trade and Investment from the University of Pretoria, and a Diploma in International Trade and Investment from the University of Amsterdam.

== Career ==
Mihretu started his career at the World Bank, where he worked on trade policy, investment climate, and economic governance. During his tenure, he helped shape economic policies that supported private sector growth across Ethiopia and sub-Saharan Africa.

Upon returning to Ethiopia, he served as a Senior Economic Advisor to Prime Minister Abiy Ahmed and Chief Trade Negotiator. He was instrumental in the rollout of the Home-Grown Economic Reform Agenda.

=== Governor of the National Bank of Ethiopia ===
Mihretu was appointed Governor of Ethiopia's Central Bank in January 2023, succeeding Yinager Dessie.

Financial Sector Reforms

The banking sector has seen new governance directives, improved financial stability measures, and a push for greater competition, including the planned entry of foreign banks. The NBE has also focused on strengthening financial oversight and encouraging innovation in financial services.

On 3 September 2025, he resigned from NBE governor stating he is motivated to "explore new challenges beyond government service."

== Recognition and influence ==
Mamo Mihretu is widely recognized as one of Africa’s leading economic reformers, playing a crucial role in stabilizing Ethiopia’s economy amid a difficult investment climate.The Economist highlights that many African nations face growing debt burdens and financial shortfalls, making it increasingly hard to attract investment.

As The Economist describes, Mihretu is the architect of many of the reforms that attracted global financial institutions to Ethiopia, but he warns that African economies face serious headwinds. He noted that a significant challenge for many African countries is the increasing difficulty of attracting needed investment.

By supporting in efforts in restructuring debt, modernizing financial policies, and opening the banking sector, Mihretu has strengthened Ethiopia’s role as a leader in economic transformation.
