= Eyob Tekalign =

Ethiopian politician

- እዮብ ተካልኝ

Governor of the National Bank of Ethiopia
- Incumbent
- Assumed office 19 September 2025
- Prime Minister: Abiy Ahmed
- Preceded by: Mamo Mihretu

State Minister of Finance
- In office 2018 – 19 September 2025
- Prime Minister: Abiy Ahmed

Personal details
- Education: Mekelle University (BA); University of Maryland (PhD); George Washington University (PhD)

Eyob Tekalign (Amharic: እዮብ ተካልኝ) is an Ethiopian politician who has been the governor of the National Bank of Ethiopia (NBE) since 2025. He was the state Minister of Finance from 2018.

== Education and career ==
Eyob Tekalign graduated from Mekelle University with a BA in Economics in 2000 and later acquired a PhD in Political Economy, and Masters in International Policy earned from the University of Maryland and the George Washington University in Washington D.C. Since then, Eyob began actively participating in public service leadership in Ethiopia and abroad. His political career spanned various roles in diplomatic missions and international and regional organizations such as the International Finance Corporation (IFC), World Bank United Nations Economic Commission for Africa, the Common Market for Eastern and Southern Africa, and the United Nations Conference on Trade and Development.

Additionally, he has worked with the Ministry of Trade and Industry, helped the ministry to sign memorandum of understanding with the Ethiopian Chamber of Commerce to establish the Ethiopian Public Private Consultative Forum (EPPCF) that stages policy onward the government and the private sector. From 2018, he was state Minister of Finance.

On 19 September 2025, Prime Minister Abiy Ahmed appointed Eyob as the new governor of the National Bank of Ethiopia (NBE), succeeding Mamo Mihretu.
