= George Rea =

George Peters Rea (1894 – 1978) was a banker, president of the Drexel Institute of Technology, and the first paid president of what is now the American Stock Exchange.

== Early life ==
Born in Buffalo, New York Rea attended Cornell University and graduated in 1915. After graduating, Rea served as a bond salesman for the Guaranty Trust Company before the war. In 1917, Rea entered the army during World War I and served one year overseas until was discharged as Captain in the 308th Machine Gun Battalion with the A.E.F. It was while in service in the trenches in World War I that he was exposed to mustard gas, contributing to breathing difficulties throughout his later life.

== Banking ==
Starting in 1925, Rea worked for Fidelity Trust Co. for four years as chief for its underwriting department, and then as vice president. During that time, he acted as the first president of the Buffalo Stock Exchange in 1928. In 1929, Rea left Colorado to join Goldman Sachs in New York. When the trust department declined Rea left and became an independent bank consultant. In 1931, Rea was offered the presidency of the Bishop National Bank of Honolulu. During his time, the bank's assets rose from $30 to $50 million. He was also responsible for taking an unstable bank and making it "one of the strongest institutions in the country." Rea retired in December 1938.

After an extended vacation abroad with his wife, Rea returned to the United States and was approached about the position of president of the New York Curb Exchange in 1939. A week after his arrival back in the states, he was unanimously elected as the first paid president in the history of the Curb Exchange. He was paid $25,000 per year and held the position for 3 years before offering his resignation in 1942. He left the position having "done such a good job that there is virtually no need for a full-time successor."

== Drexel Institute ==
In July 1942, after the death of Parke Kolbe, Rea was offered the presidency of the Drexel Institute of Technology. At the time he assumed office, August 1, 1942, it was said that he was "one of the youngest college president in the country." When Rea assumed presidency the Institute was undergoing financial and enrollment hardships due to World War II. Rea had a laid back style when dealing with students and staff, however, his methods in running the school were controversial, bringing forceful negative and positive responses. His bold decisions were often made without the agreement of the faculty senate or without regard to popular opinion, and his personal style of handling matters was laid back and informal. This casual atmosphere failed to address the problems that the hardships of the war had brought the Institution. After 2 years with the Institute, Rea resigned in 1944 citing a "wish to return to private business."

== Later life ==
At the age of 62 Rea was appointed the governor of the State Bank of Ethiopia. He served in that position until 1959 when he returned to New York at the age of 65. Rea died in 1978.
