= Order of the Star of Ethiopia =

Ethiopian order of knighthood

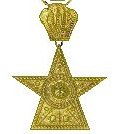
- Badge of the order
- Type: Order
- Country: Ethiopian Empire
- Religious affiliation: Ethiopian Orthodox
- Emperor of Ethiopia
- Ribbon of the order

The Order of the Star of Ethiopia was established as an order of knighthood of the Ethiopian Empire, founded by the Negus of Shewa and later Emperor of Ethiopia Menelik II in 1884–1885. It is currently awarded as a house order by the Crown Council of Ethiopia.

The Order was established to honour foreign and domestic civilian and military officials and individuals for service to the country, and is considered the fifth ranking order of the Empire of Ethiopia alongside the Order of Menelik II.

All grades of the Order are approved for wear as a foreign order (i.e. after all British and other Commonwealth decorations) in Commonwealth realms, as it is on the "Schedule of Approved Countries and Awards". Elizabeth II herself was awarded the Chain and Collar of the Order of the Seal of Solomon.

== Grades ==
First Class

1. Grand Cross (GCSE)

Second Class

1. Grand Officer (GOSE)
2. Commander (CSE)

Third Class

1. Officer (OSE)
2. Member (MSE)

== Recipients ==
- Head
  - Haile Selassie
- Grand Crosses
  - Abbas II of Egypt
  - Alfred, 2nd Prince of Montenuovo
  - Prince Arthur, Duke of Connaught and Strathearn
  - Sidney Barton
  - Edward VII
  - Carl August Ehrensvärd (1892–1974)
  - George VI
  - Knud, Hereditary Prince of Denmark
  - Hussein Refki Pasha
  - Seyoum Mengesha
  - Wilfred Gilbert Thesiger
  - Alamsyah Ratu Perwiranegara
- Grand Officers
  - Johannes Brun (officer)
  - Tunku Osman
  - Paul Scully-Power
- Commanders
  - Guy Gibson Campbell
  - Ralph Cobbold
  - Meir Dizengoff
  - Clifford Henry Fitzherbert Plowman
  - Adolf Bredo Stabell (diplomat)
- Grand Cordons
  - Amha Selassie
  - Kenneth Anderson (British Army officer)
  - Desta Damtew
  - Prince Makonnen
- Officers
  - Philip Norton Banks
  - Lord Edward Gleichen
  - Yngve A. A. Larsson
  - John Qvale
- Members
- Unclassified
  - Leonid Artamonov
  - William Horwood (police commissioner)
  - Harald Juell
  - Gordon MacCreagh
  - Mary of Teck
  - Georgios Prokopiou
  - George C. Thorpe

== Literature ==
- Honneur & Gloire. Les trésors de la collection Spada, Paris: Musée national de la Légion d’honneur et des ordres de chevalerie, 2008, p. 354–355.
- «Ethiopian Imperial Orders» i Guy Stair Sainty og Rafal Heydel-Mankoo: World Orders of Knighthood and Merit, andre bind, Buckingham: Burke's Peerage, 2006, p. 779–781.
- Gregor Gatscher-Riedl: Die Orden des äthiopischen Kaiserreichs und der salomonidischen Dynastie. In: Zeitschrift der Österreichischen Gesellschaft für Ordenskunde, Nr. 91, Wien, August 2013, p. 1-22.
