= Oromia Bank =

Private bank in Ethiopia

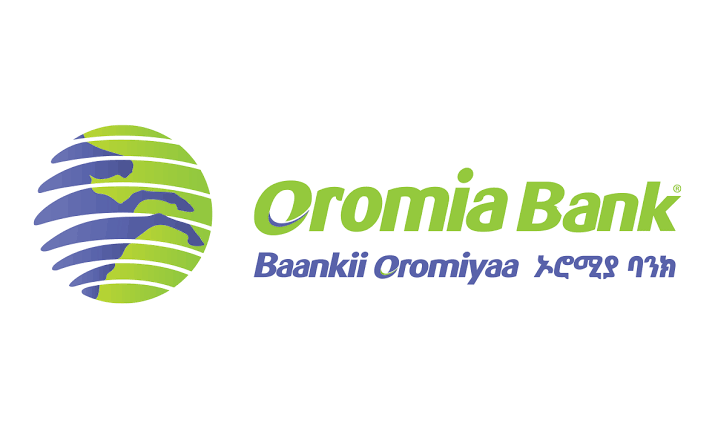
- Company type: Financial institution
- Founded: 18 September 2008; 17 years ago
- Headquarters: Addis Ababa, Ethiopia
- Key people: Teferi Mekonnen (CEO)
- Products: Financial services
- Number of employees: Over 5,000
- Website: oromiabank.com

Oromia Bank (OB) is a private bank based in Addis Ababa, Ethiopia. It was established on 18 September 2008.

== Overview ==
Oromia Bank S.C began operation on 25 October 2008 with a starting capital of 110 million birr (Br), surpassing the minimum capital requirement by 35 million Br. With its headquarters located in front of Dembel City Centre, near Getu Commercial Center in its own 13 story building on Africa Avenue (Bole Road).

Established with the commercial banking business objectives, OIB provides universal services including deposit mobilization, lending of money, remittance service, and international banking services and interest free banking.

== See also ==
- List of banks in Ethiopia
