= John Qvale =

John Ottar Qvale MVO (14 July 1911 – 14 October 1997) was a Norwegian police chief and judge.

He was born in Kristiania, the son of merchant John Qvale (1884–1915) and Karen Berg (1884–1958). In 1939 he married Anna Marie Nilsen. His brother was the musician Kai Angel Næsteby who played with Oslo Philharmonic Orchestra for more than 40 years. He enrolled as a student in 1930. He was trained as a military officer in 1932, and attended the Hærens Flyveskole in 1934. He also took the cand.jur. degree, and was a deputy judge in Oslo from 1937 to 1938 and Senja in 1938. In between he was a secretary in the Supreme Court. He was a secretary in the Ministry of Social Affairs from 1942, police superintendent in Kristiansand from 1945 and Romerike from 1947.

He was acting chief of police in Romerike from 1950 to 1951 before serving as police inspector in Bergen from 1951 and in Oslo from 1954. He was the chief of police in Asker and Bærum from 1961 to 1972, and stipendiary magistrate in Oslo from 1972.

He chaired his trade union Politiembetsmennenes Landsforening from 1956 to 1958 and 1966 to 1970, having previously been deputy chair from 1955 to 1956. He was also a member of the Aviation Accident Commission from 1956 to 1960.

Qvale was highly decorated. He received the Defence Medal 1940–1945 for participation in World War II, and the Haakon VII Jubilee Medal of 1955. He was a Knight First Class of the Order of the Dannebrog (Denmark) and the Order of Vasa (Sweden), a Member of the Royal Victorian Order (United Kingdom), a Grand Knight of the Order of the Falcon (Iceland) and an Officer of the Order of the Star of Ethiopia. He was a Commander of the Order of Leopold (Belgium), the Order of the Lion of Finland, the Order of Merit of the Italian Republic, the Order of the Yugoslav Flag, the Order of Merit of the Federal Republic of Germany, the Decoration of Honour for Services to the Republic of Austria, the Order of the Lion and the Sun (Iran), the Order of the Tunisian Republic. He died in October 1997 and was buried in Ullern.
