= Dembel City Center =

Shopping mall in Addis Ababa, Ethiopia

- Location: Addis Ababa, Ethiopia
- Coordinates: 9.0047°N 38.7669°E
- Opened: 2002
- Developer: Yemiru Nega
- Num. of stores: 105
- Floors: 12
- Parking: 672

Dembel City Center, also known as Dembel Mall, is a shopping center in Addis Ababa. Located in the center of the city less than 3 mi (4.8 km) from Bole International Airport, it was one of the first Western-style shopping malls in Ethiopia. Built in 2002, the twelve-floor structure has 123 spaces for shops and offices. It currently has about 105 shops, restaurants and galleries.

Dembel City Center is part of a modern development of the city center along Bole Road, also known as Airport Road or Africa Avenue. Bole Road, like many streets in Addis Ababa, is experiencing a construction boom spurred by the growing Ethiopian economy. However, recent construction to revamp this major avenue has disrupted access to many shopping centers, including Dembel City Center, requiring some businesses to move to new locations.
