= National Bank of Ethiopia =

Central bank of Ethiopia

National Bank of Ethiopia የኢትዮጵያ ብሔራዊ ባንክ
- Central bank of: Ethiopia
- Headquarters: Sudan St, Addis Ababa, Ethiopia
- Coordinates: 9°01′02″N 38°45′02″E
- Established: 15 February 1906; 120 years ago
- Ownership: 100% state ownership
- Governor: Eyob Tekalign
- Currency: Ethiopian birr ETB (ISO 4217)
- Reserves: $3.4 billion
- Bank rate: 8.00%
- Interest on reserves: 3.00%
- Website: nbe.gov.et

The National Bank of Ethiopia (NBE; Amharic: የኢትዮጵያ ብሔራዊ ባንክ) is the central bank of Ethiopia. Its headquarters are in the capital city of Addis Ababa. Eyob Tekalign has been the current governor of the bank since 2025.

The bank is active in promoting financial inclusion policy and is a member of the Alliance for Financial Inclusion (AFI).

== History ==
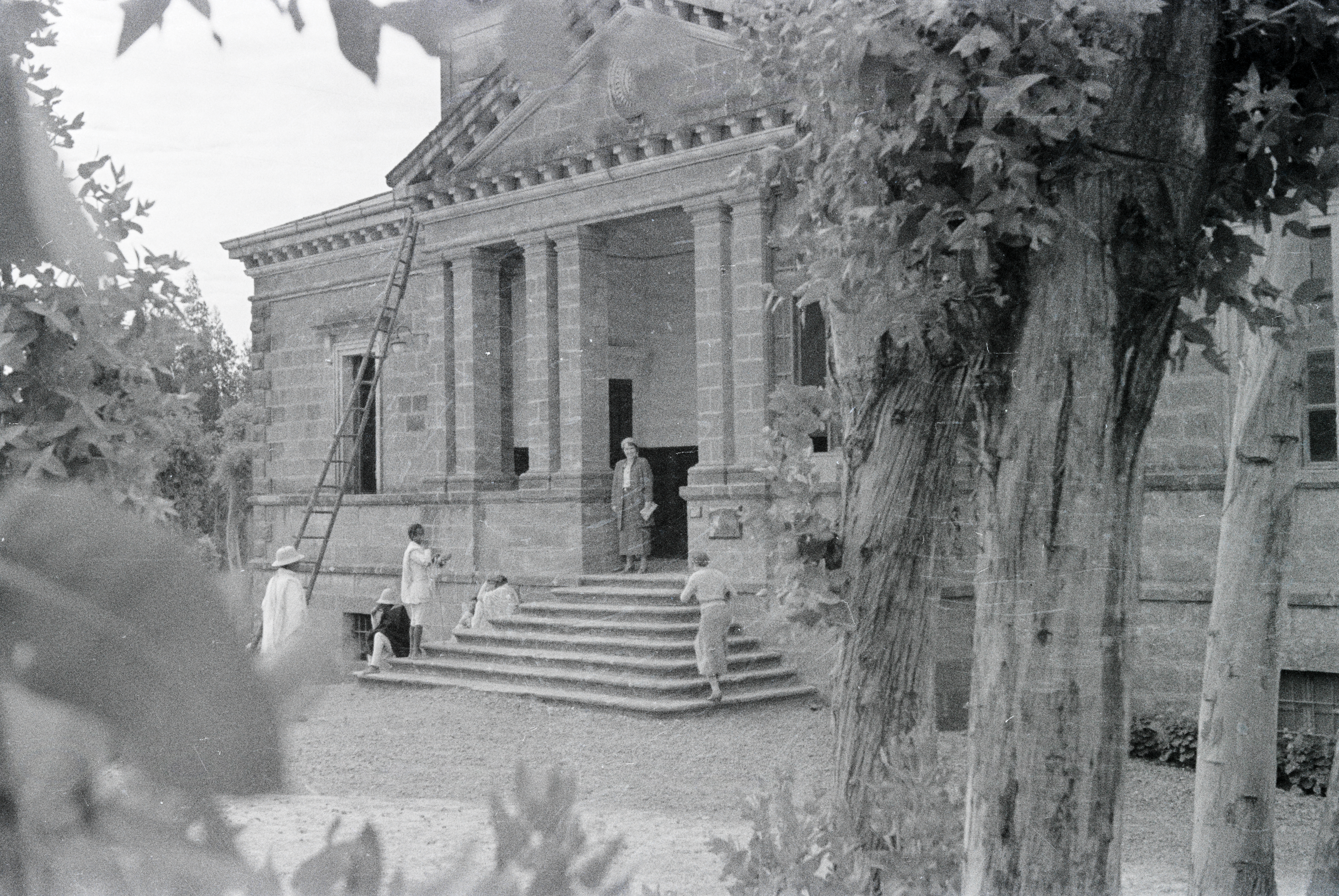
Bank of Ethiopia (1934)

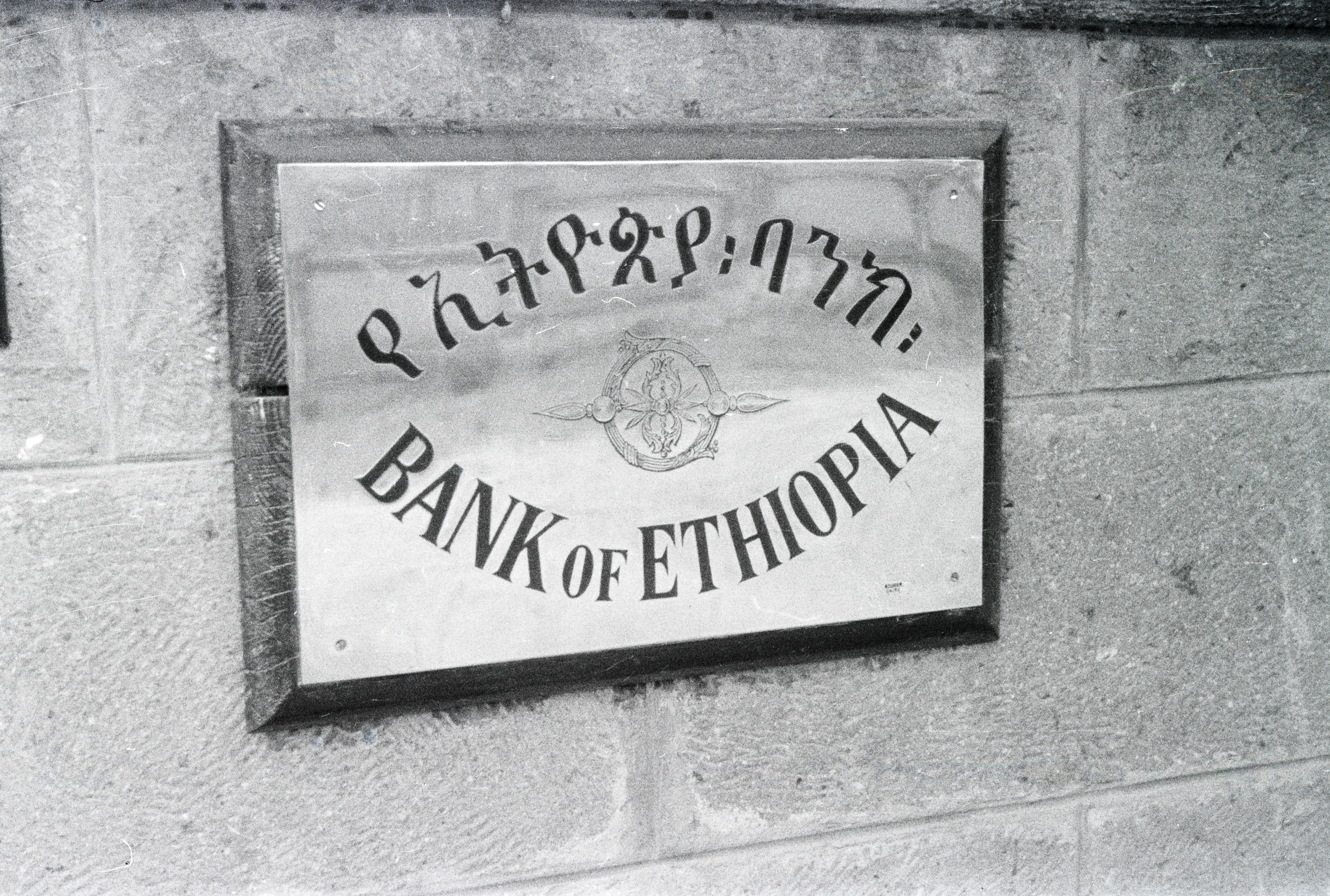
1934

On 15 February 1906, marked the beginning of banking in Ethiopia when the first Bank of Abyssinia was inaugurated by Emperor Menelik II. It was a private bank whose shares were sold in Addis Ababa, New York, Paris, London, and Vienna. The bank opened numerous branches including ones in Harar (1906), Dire Dawa (1908), Gore (1912), and Dese (1920). One of the first projects the bank financed was the Franco-Ethiopian Railway which reached Addis Ababa in 1917. The bank then opened a transit office in Djibouti in 1920.

In 1931, Emperor Haile Selassie introduced reforms into the banking system. The Bank of Abyssinia was liquidated the newly established Bank of Ethiopia, a fully government-owned bank, taking over management, staff and premises of the ceased bank. The Bank of Ethiopia provided central and commercial banking services to the country. However, the Italian invasion in 1935 brought the demise of one of the earliest initiatives in African banking. During the Italian occupation, Italian banks were active in Ethiopia.

On 15 April 1943, the State Bank of Ethiopia became the central bank and was active until 1963. By the time it ceased operations in 1963, the State Bank of Ethiopia had established 19 domestic branches, a branch in Khartoum, and a transit office in Djibouti.

The National Bank of Ethiopia was established in 1963 by Proclamation 206 of 1963 and began operation in January 1964. The establishment of the new organization was aided by U.S Department of State emissary, Earle O. Latham, who was the first Vice President of the Federal Reserve Bank of Boston.

Prior to this proclamation, the bank carried out dual activities i.e. commercial banking and central banking. The proclamation raised the bank's capital to 10 million Ethiopian Dollars and granted broad administrative autonomy and juridical personality. Following the proclamation the National Bank of Ethiopia was entrusted with the following responsibilities:

- To regulate the supply, availability and cost of money and credit.
- To manage and administer the country's international reserves.
- To license and supervise banks and hold commercial banks reserves and lend money to them.
- To supervise loans of commercial banks and regulate interest rates.
- To issue paper money and coins.
- To act as an agent of the Government.
- To fix and control the foreign exchange rates.

However, monetary and banking proclamation No. 99 of 1976 came into force in September 1976 to shape the bank's role according to the socialist economic principle that the country adopted. Hence the bank was allowed to participate actively in national planning, specifically financial planning, in cooperation with the concerned state organs. The bank's supervisory area was also increased to include other financial institutions such as insurance institutions, credit cooperatives and investment-oriented banks. Moreover, the proclamation introduced the new 'Ethiopian birr' in place of the former Ethiopian Dollar that ceased to be legal tender.

The proclamation revised the bank's relationship with Government. It initially raised the legal limits of outstanding government domestic borrowing to 25% of the actual ordinary revenue of the government during the proceeding three budget years as against the proclamation 206/1963, which set it to be 15%.

This proclamation was in force till the new proclamation issued in 1994 to reorganize the bank according to the market-based economic policy so that it could foster monetary stability, a sound financial system and such other credit and exchange conditions as are conductive to the balanced growth of the economy of the country. Accordingly, the following are some of the powers and duties vested in the bank by proclamation 83/1994.

- Regulate the supply and availability of money and credit and applicable interest and other changes.
- Set limits on gold and foreign exchange assets which banks and other financial institutions authorized to deal in foreign exchange and hold in deposits.
- Set limits on the net foreign exchange position and on the terms and amount of external indebtedness of banks and other financial institutions.
- Make short and long-term refinancing facilities available to banks and other financial institutions.

Lastly, the proclamation has also raised the paid-up capital of the bank from Birr 30.0 million to Birr 50.0 million. On 14 October 2022, NBE issued foreign currency restriction to control local forex. 38 imported goods were prohibited such as liquors, automobiles, furniture, foods among others unless they register to national banks to approve accessing the foreign currency. The restriction includes Ethiopian birr more than 3,000 and US dollar, applied to foreign nationals leaving Ethiopia to any countries, except Djibouti.

== Financial inclusion ==
The National Bank of Ethiopia is one of the original 17 regulatory institutions to make specific national commitments to financial inclusion under the Alliance for Financial Inclusion's (AFI) Maya Declaration.

== Governors ==
- Charles S. Collier, Briton, 1913-1936
- George Blowers, American, 1942–1949
- Jack Bennett, American, 1949–1953
- Walter H. Rozell, Jr., American, 1953–1956
- Neil Perry, American, 1956
- George Rea, American, 1956–1959
- 1st: Menasse Lemma, 1959–1974
- 2nd: Taffara Deguefé, 1974–1976
- 3rd: Legesse Tickeher, 1976–1978
- 4th: Tadesse Gebrekidan, 1978–1988
- 5th: Bekele Tamirat, 1988–1991
- 6th: Leikun Berhanu, 1991–1995
- 7th: Dubale Jale, 1995–2006
- 8th: Teklewold Atnafu, 2006–2018
- 9th: Yinager Dessie, 2018–2023
- 10th: Mamo Mihretu, 2023–2025
- 11th:Eyob Tekalign, 2025-Present

== See also ==
- Central banks and currencies of Africa
- Commercial Bank of Ethiopia
- Economy of Ethiopia
- List of central banks
- List of financial supervisory authorities by country
