= Harald Juell =

Norwegian diplomat, ambassador and military officer

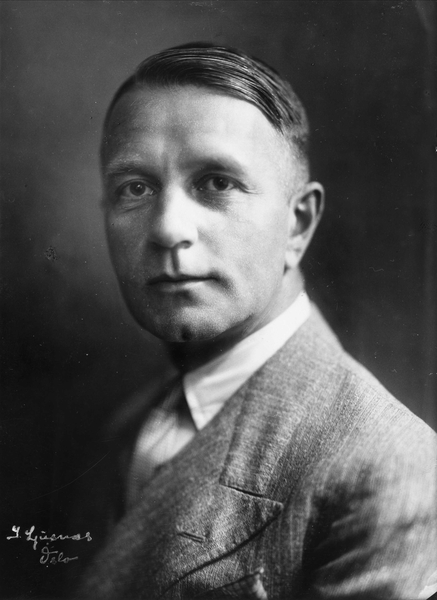
Harald Juell, c. 1930

Harald Juell (17 March 1894 – 17 May 1980) was a Norwegian diplomat, ambassador and military officer.

== Biography ==
He was born in Arendal, the son of Christian Fredrik Iuell (1858–1922) and Mathilde Fredrikke Augusta Hoyer (1864-1937). His brothers were prison director Niels Iuell and judge Torolf Juell. He attended Kristiania Commerce School (Oslo handelsgymnasium) from 1910 to 1912. He graduated from the Sorbonne in 1916. He studied at the École des Hautes Études Commerciales and at the Faculté de Droit in Paris from 1916 to 1918. He became a certified translator in French and English.

From 1914 to 1916, Juell was a secretary at the Norwegian Consulate in Algiers before studying in France. In 1922, he was hired in the Norwegian Ministry of Foreign Affairs, and worked there the rest of the interwar period, except for the years 1929 to 1932 when he worked for French mining companies in Addis Abeba, Ethiopia. In 1932 he returned to the foreign service and became secretary of the Norwegian delegation which negotiated trade treaty with the United Kingdom.

In 1938 he became legation secretary in London, and in 1941 he became consul in Halifax, Nova Scotia. In 1941 he briefly served as a program council member of the Norwegian Broadcasting Corporation-in-exile. Juell was a consul in Halifax until 1946

From 1946 to 1947 he was Legislative Council and Deputy Chief of the Norwegian Military Mission in Berlin, and was also acting leader of the Norwegian military mission, holding the rank of lieutenant colonel. In addition he spent some time working to find the facts surrounding the death of writer and war correspondent Nordahl Grieg.

He then returned to the regular diplomacy as chargé d'affaires in Greece from 1947, a post he had until 1950. He was consul-general in Antwerp from 1950, and Norway's ambassador to Cuba from 1958. From 1958 to 1964, he was also the ambassador to the Dominican Republic and Haiti. He retired from the diplomatic service in 1964 and died in Oslo during 1980.

Juell released the book Etiopia. Tre år i keiser Haile Selassis rike in 1935, about his experiences in Ethiopia. He released a book about his Nova Scotia experience in 1968, titled En havn på Østkysten. In their book review, newspaper Verdens Gang praised the effort of telling relevant stories from the war, but added that the tone and style was too dry and mundane.

He was decorated as a Knight, First Class of the Order of St. Olav, Commander, First Class of the Greek Order of the Phoenix, Knight of the Belgian Order of Leopold II and the Order of the Star of Ethiopia.
