= Torolf Juell =

Norwegian military officer and judge

Torolf Juell (4 November 1897 – 16 September 1983) was a Norwegian military officer and judge.

He was born in Arendal as a son of Christian Fredrik Iuell (1858–1922) and Mathilde Fredrikke Augusta Hoyer. He was a brother of prison director Niels Iuell and diplomat Harald Juell. In 1935 he married Maria Cecilia Monrad-Krohn, a daughter of medicine professor Georg Monrad-Krohn and older sister of Lars Monrad-Krohn.

Juell finished secondary education in 1916 and graduated from officer school in 1917. He entered law studies and graduated from the Royal Frederick University with the cand.jur. degree in 1922, and after being a deputy judge in Nord-Gudbrandsdal District Court from 1922 to 1923 and junior attorney in Elverum from 1924 to 1925, he studied to become an average adjuster. From 1926 to 1930 he worked as a consultant for Tinfos. He was joined in that company by his brother Niels in 1929. Juell earned his barrister's license in 1930, gaining access to work with Supreme Court cases, and also studied in England and France to become a certified French translator. He worked in Oslo from 1933. He continued a military career on the side, and reached the rank of rittmester in 1939. He was also a deputy chairman of the nationwide Conscript Officers' Association.

Between 1943 and 1945 he was held as a prisoner-of-war by Nazi Germany. After his arrest on 16 August 1943, he was held in the camps Schildberg and then Luckenwalde until it was liberated. After the Second World War he was a judge in Oslo City Court from 1945 to 1967. He then worked various jobs; in the Ministry of Finance, Ministry of Industry and the Ministry of Foreign Affairs.
