= George Blowers =

American economist

- Born: March 5, 1906; Pineville, Kentucky
- Died: October 19, 1969 (aged 63); Hempstead, Long Island, New York

Academic background
- Education: Harvard University

George Blowers (March 5, 1906 – October 19, 1969) was an American economist. A Harvard graduate, he became governor of the state banks of Liberia, Ethiopia and Saudi Arabia. During his career he was responsible for introducing two new currencies and represented Ethiopia at the Bretton Woods Conference.

== Early career and Liberia ==
Born on March 5, 1906, in Pineville, Kentucky, Blowers graduated from Harvard University before gaining a job at the National City Bank in New York City in 1928. In 1938 he became general manager of the Bank of Monrovia in Liberia, during which time he was responsible for changing the country's currency from the West African pound (pegged to sterling) to the Liberian dollar (pegged to the US dollar). The Smithsonian Institution's 1940 National Zoological Park expedition to Monrovia met with Blowers and he presented his household pets, a red forest duiker, a civet cat and a West African linsang, to them for use as zoo exhibits. British Foreign Office staff writing to Anthony Eden in March 1942 noted that Blowers adhered strictly to the American policy of neutrality, opposing attempts to enforce British control of capital in Liberia. Blowers, who could speak German, was known to have transferred German funds through Liberia to the United States.

== State Bank of Ethiopia ==
Blowers was appointed governor of the State Bank of Ethiopia in 1943 following a request by Emperor Haile Selassie for more American advisers to replace the British staff that predominated in his court. The 1942 Anglo-Ethiopian Agreement required Selassie to seek British approval prior to the appointment of any foreign staff. The British were not informed of the new appointments and the arrival of Blowers in Ethiopia came as something of an embarrassment to his British predecessor, who was still in post. Ethiopia formally renounced the treaty with Britain in 1944.

Blowers, in addition to his duties as governor, also acted as adviser to the Ethiopian Minister of Commerce, who preferred him over his official British adviser. Blowers attended the July 1944 Bretton Woods Conference that resulted in the introduction of the Bretton Woods system of foreign exchange. In 1945 he was responsible for the reintroduction of the Ethiopian birr to replace the East African shilling.

== Later career ==
Blowers became deputy director of the Economic Cooperation Administration, set up to administer the US Marshall Plan for economic rejuvenation in Europe, in 1948. He became known as an expert of African economics and was appointed head of a UN mission to Libya, looking into its currency and banking system, in 1950. He later worked with the International Monetary Fund and in 1952 was appointed governor of the Saudi Arabian Monetary Agency (which functioned as the central bank but couldn't be described as such under Islamic law), having been recommended to the position by Arthur N Young, the director of Harry Truman's Point Four Program in the country. The bank started off with a fund of $10 million that was developed into billions of dollars of capital. During his time as governor he revised the Saudi riyal.

Blowers became director of the Export–Import Bank of the United States in Washington, D.C., in 1954. He became well known to Latin American governments, travelling to Peru, Ecuador and Bolivia on special missions. He retired from the bank in 1961 and died at Hempstead, Long Island, New York, on October 19, 1969.
