= Entoto Mountains =

Mountainous region in Addis Ababa, Ethiopia

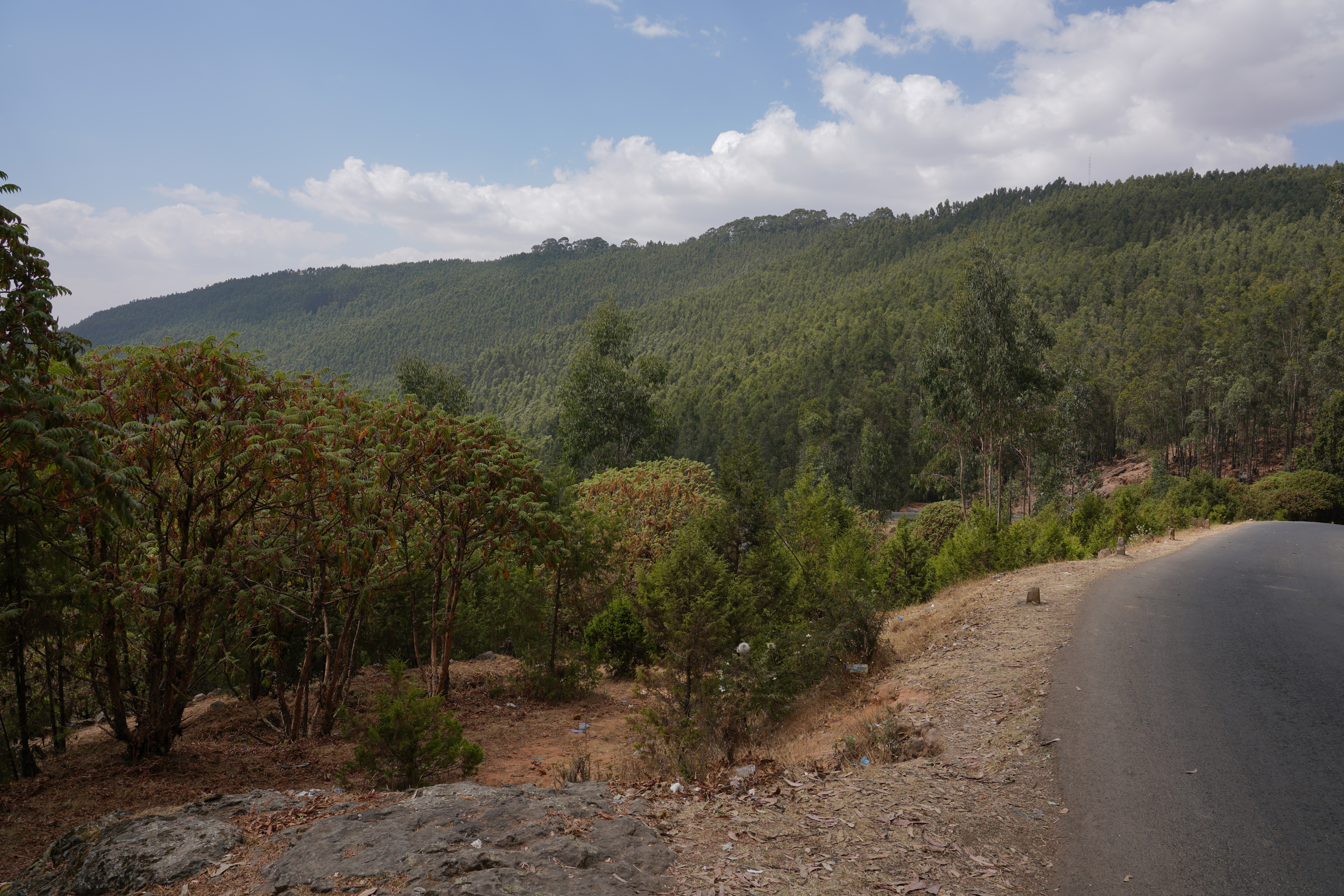

The Entoto Mountains or Entoto Hills (Amharic: እንጦጦ) is a mountainous region in Addis Ababa, Ethiopia. It lies immediately north of Addis Ababa, in the Ethiopian Highlands and central region of Ethiopia.

A prominent peak at the top of the Entoto Mountains is Mount Entoto. It served as Menelik II's capital before the founding of Addis Ababa.

According to the Bible Society in 2011, thousands of women work on the mountains carrying very heavy loads of eucalyptus wood on their backs to the city below, for an income of less than 50 pence a day.
