= Commercial Bank of Ethiopia =

Largest bank in Ethiopia

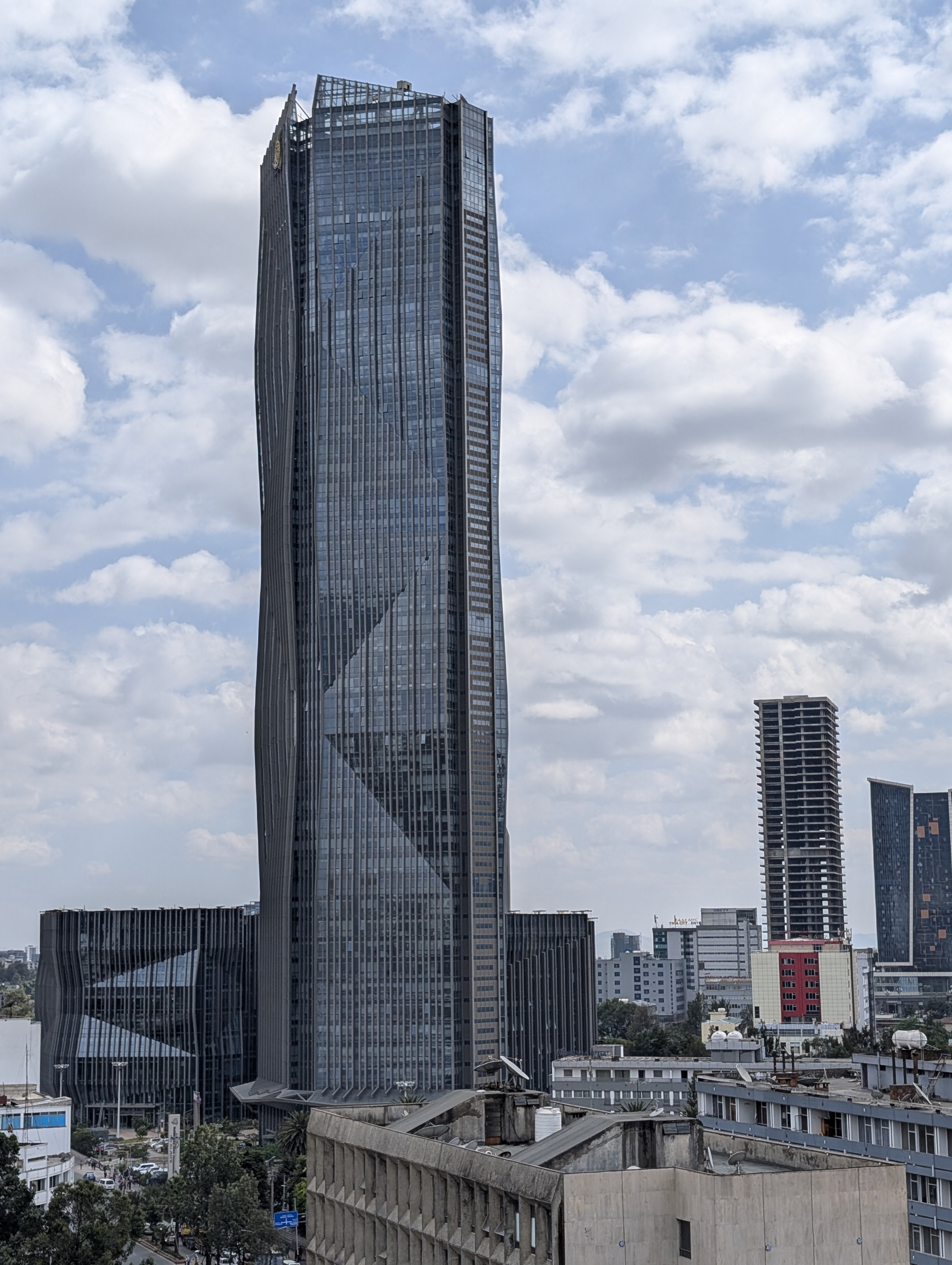
- Commercial Bank of Ethiopia Headquarters in Addis Ababa
- Native name: የኢትዮጵያ ንግድ ባንክ
- Type: State owned enterprise
- Industry: Finance
- Founded: 26 August 1942; 84 years ago
- Headquarters: Commercial Bank of Ethiopia Headquarters, Gambia St, Addis Ababa, Ethiopia
- Number of locations: 1,948 (2023)
- Key people: Abe Sano (President)
- Products: Financial services
- Revenue: ▲163.2 billion birr (2023)
- Net income: Birr 10.32 billion (June 2018)
- Total assets: ▲1.3 trillion birr (2023)
- Number of employees: 34,879 permanent
- Website: www.combanketh.et

The Commercial Bank of Ethiopia (CBE) is the largest commercial bank in Ethiopia. As of June 2021, it had about 1.1 trillion birr in assets and held approximately 67% of deposits and about 53% of all bank loans in the country. The bank has around more than 35,000 employees as of June 2022, who staff its headquarters and its over 1000+ branches positioned in the main cities and regional towns. The latter include 120 branches in the national capital Addis Ababa. With the opening of a branch in the Gechi in the Illubabor Zone, CBE's banking network has reached online 783 branches. The bank has reached more than 1950 branches as of 10 August 2022.

The bank also operates two branches in South Sudan. It is contemplating re-opening a branch in Djibouti, and opening branches in Dubai and Washington, DC, all to serve the Ethiopian diaspora.

The bank is pioneer to introduce modern banking to Ethiopia and credited for playing a catalytic role in the economic progress and development of the country. It is also the first bank in Ethiopia to introduce ATM service for local users.

== History ==
After the Ethiopian victory over Italy during World War II, the new government issued a proclamation on 26 August 1942 that established the State Bank of Ethiopia (SBE). SBE commenced full operations on 15 April 1943 with two branches and 43 staff. It served both as Ethiopia's central bank, with the power to issue banknotes and coins as the agent of the Ministry of Finance, and as the principal commercial bank in the country. In 1945 the Ethiopian government granted the bank the sole right of issuing currency. The first governor of the bank was an American, George Blowers. He inaugurated the new national currency, which owed its successful introduction to the United States. The United States provided the silver for 50-cent coins, whose intrinsic value ensured popular acceptance of the new paper money to a population used to the circulation of the silver Maria Theresa thaler. In 1958, the State Bank of Ethiopia established a branch in Khartoum, Sudan. Over time SBD's branch network grew to number 21 branches.

In the 1950s, SBE established a branch in Djibouti. In 1920 the Bank of Abyssinia had opened a transit office in Djibouti. At some point after the creation of the State Bank of Ethiopia it reopened the transit office, which in time became a branch.

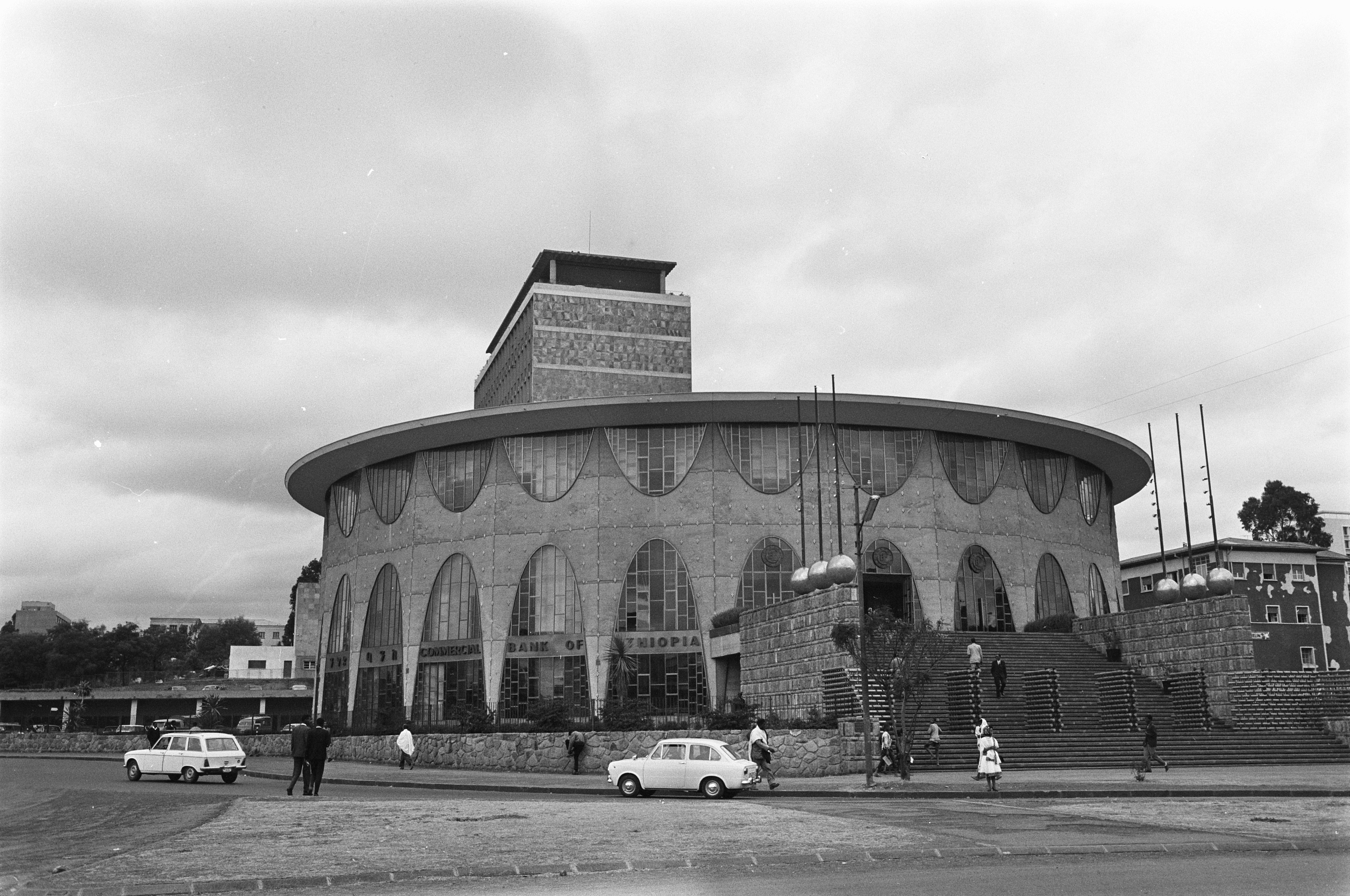
CBE in 1969

In 1963, the Ethiopian government split the State Bank of Ethiopia into two banks, the National Bank of Ethiopia (the central bank), and the Commercial Bank of Ethiopia (CBE). Seven years later, the Sudanese government nationalized the Commercial Bank of Ethiopia's branch in Khartoum that had originally been the Sudan branch of SBD.

The Ethiopian government merged Addis Bank into the Commercial Bank of Ethiopia in 1980 to make CBE the sole commercial bank in the country. The government had created Addis Bank from the merger of the newly nationalized Addis Ababa Bank, and the Ethiopian operations of the Banco di Roma and Banco di Napoli. Addis Ababa Bank was an affiliate that National and Grindlays Bank had established in 1963 and of which it owned 40%. At the time of nationalization, Addis Ababa Bank had 26 branches. The merger of Addis Ababa Bank with CBE made CBE the sole commercial bank in Ethiopia, with 128 branches and 3,633 employees.

In 1991, when Eritrea achieved its independence, the Eritrean government nationalized the branches there. In 1994 these branches formed the basis for what became the Commercial Bank of Eritrea. Also in 1994, the Ethiopian government reorganized and reestablished CBE.

In 2004, CBE closed its branch in Djibouti due to problems with loan losses.

In January 2009, CBE received regulatory approval to open a branch in Juba, Southern Sudan. CBE expanded its presence in South Sudan to five branches in Juba and Malakal, but ongoing conflict in the country has forced CBE to close all but two branches in Juba.

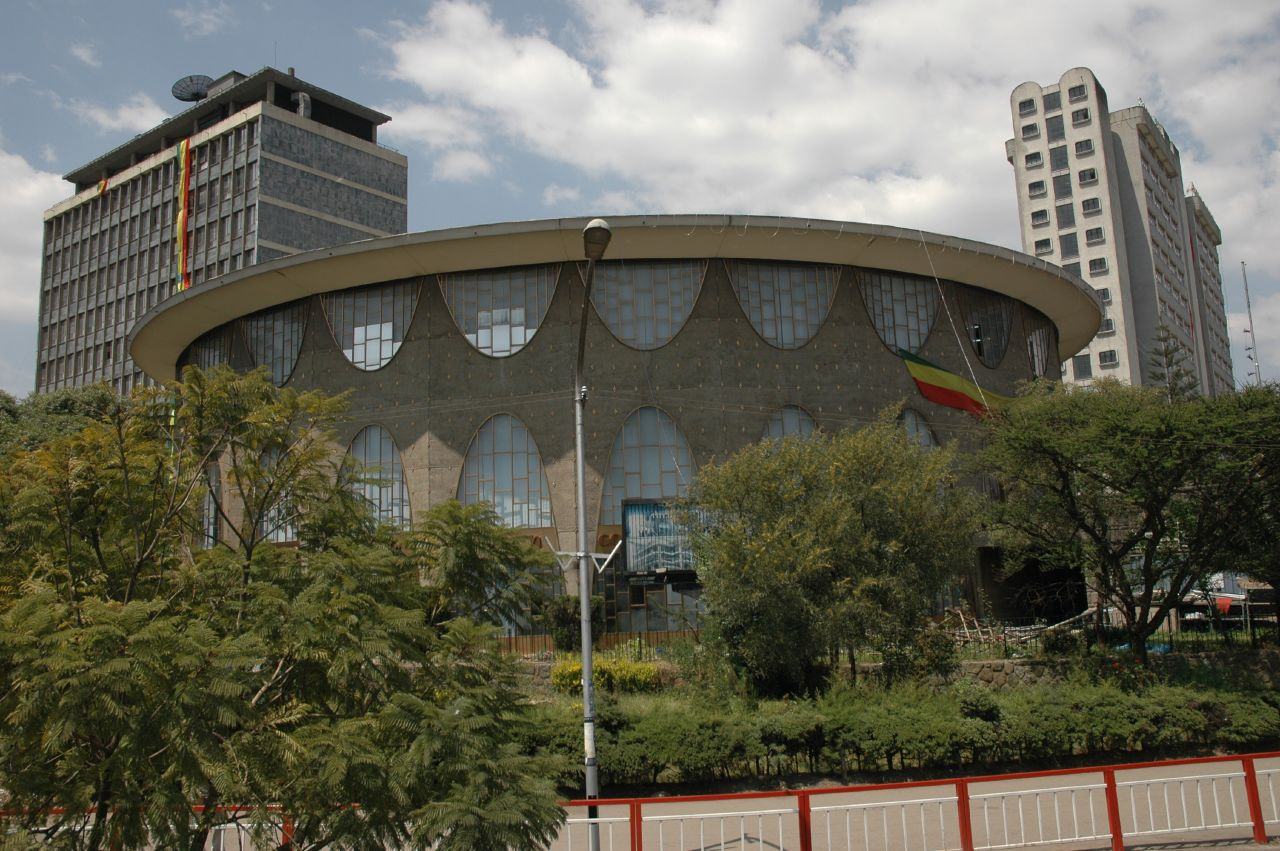
Former headquarter of CBE until 2022

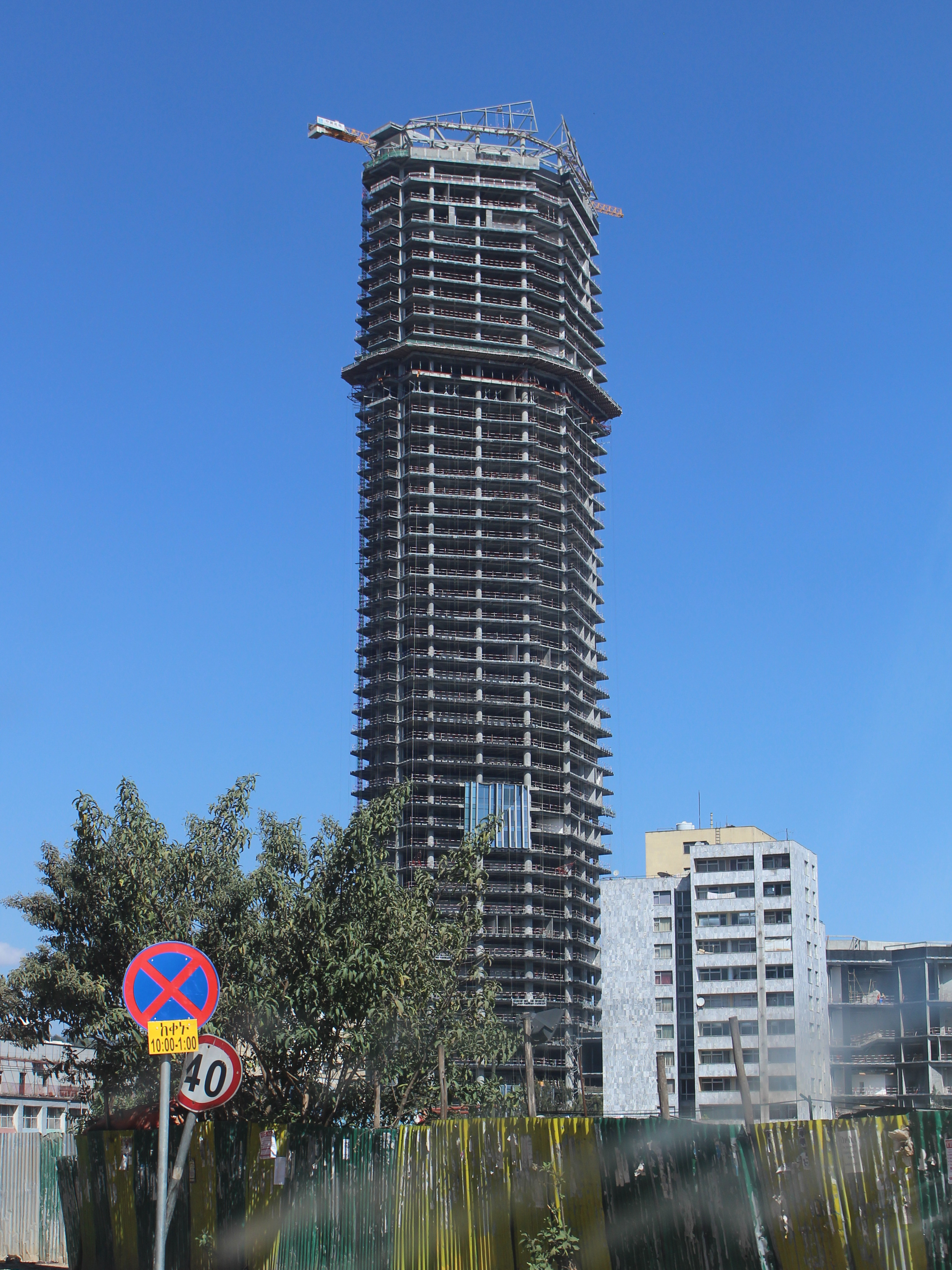
The Commercial Bank of Ethiopia Headquarters under construction in 2020

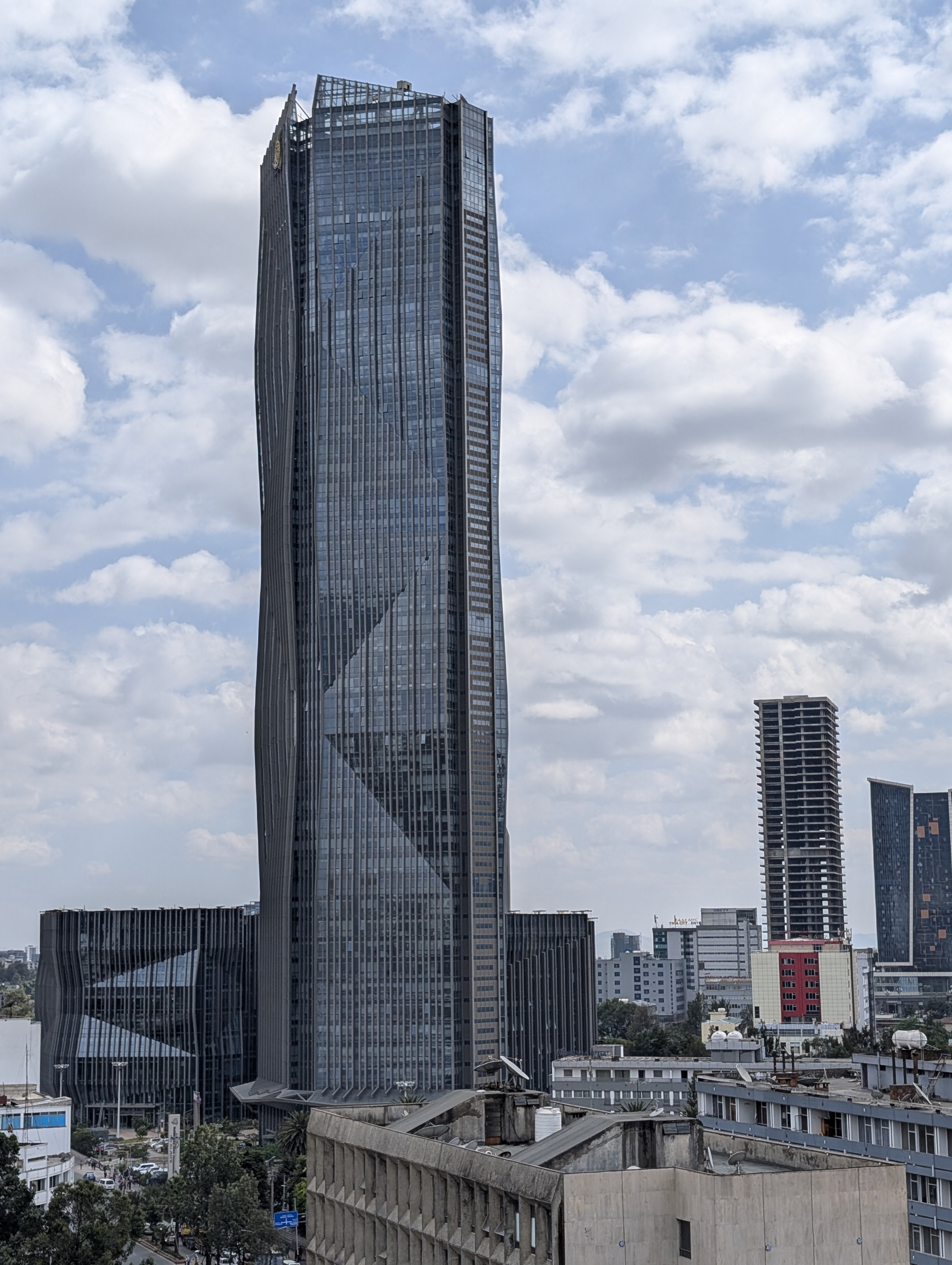
The new CBE building, becoming the tallest skyscraper in Ethiopia and in East Africa.

In February 2022, the government restructured CBE and signed a contract with Royal Bank of Scotland for management consultancy services. After the death of its former President Gezahegn Yilma, the Board of Management appointed Abie Sano as a new President of the Bank. The Parliament recently increased the bank's capital to 4 billion Ethiopian birr. The bank has reached 1,284 branches as of 10 August 2018.

On 27 March 2025, CBE officially launched MasterCard payment system. Speaking to the launching event, CBE president Abe Sano said the introduction of MasterCard is to boost digital payment across the globe, customers ease in secure, covenant electronic payment method connected to international transactions.

== Efficiency ==
Comparing with other domestically owned private commercial banks, Commercial Bank of Ethiopia is operating technically more efficiently in using inputs. However, for the past three or more decades, the bank has been protected by Ethiopian government from domestic competitive pressures in different ways. One form of such protection is that to put the bank to be a sole mobilizer and administrator of almost all low cost public funds. In fact, the bank has been serving as a primary source of funds for almost every mega projects of Ethiopian government, but at the cost of credit misallocation.

== 2024 glitch incident ==
On 15 March 2024, reports were circulated on social media that the bank was compromised for night between 12 a.m. and 3 a.m. Users can transfer large amount of money that their account don't have and access ATM machines without actual deposit. Elias Meseret, an AP journalist stated on social media that he got witnesses who knew the crime. CBE also stated that it affected the branch level as well as the mobile banking system, particularly the CBE online service. The bank also dismissed the social media claims that ATM system was restored to provide "digital banking".

== See also ==
- List of banks in Ethiopia
