= Languages of Zambia =

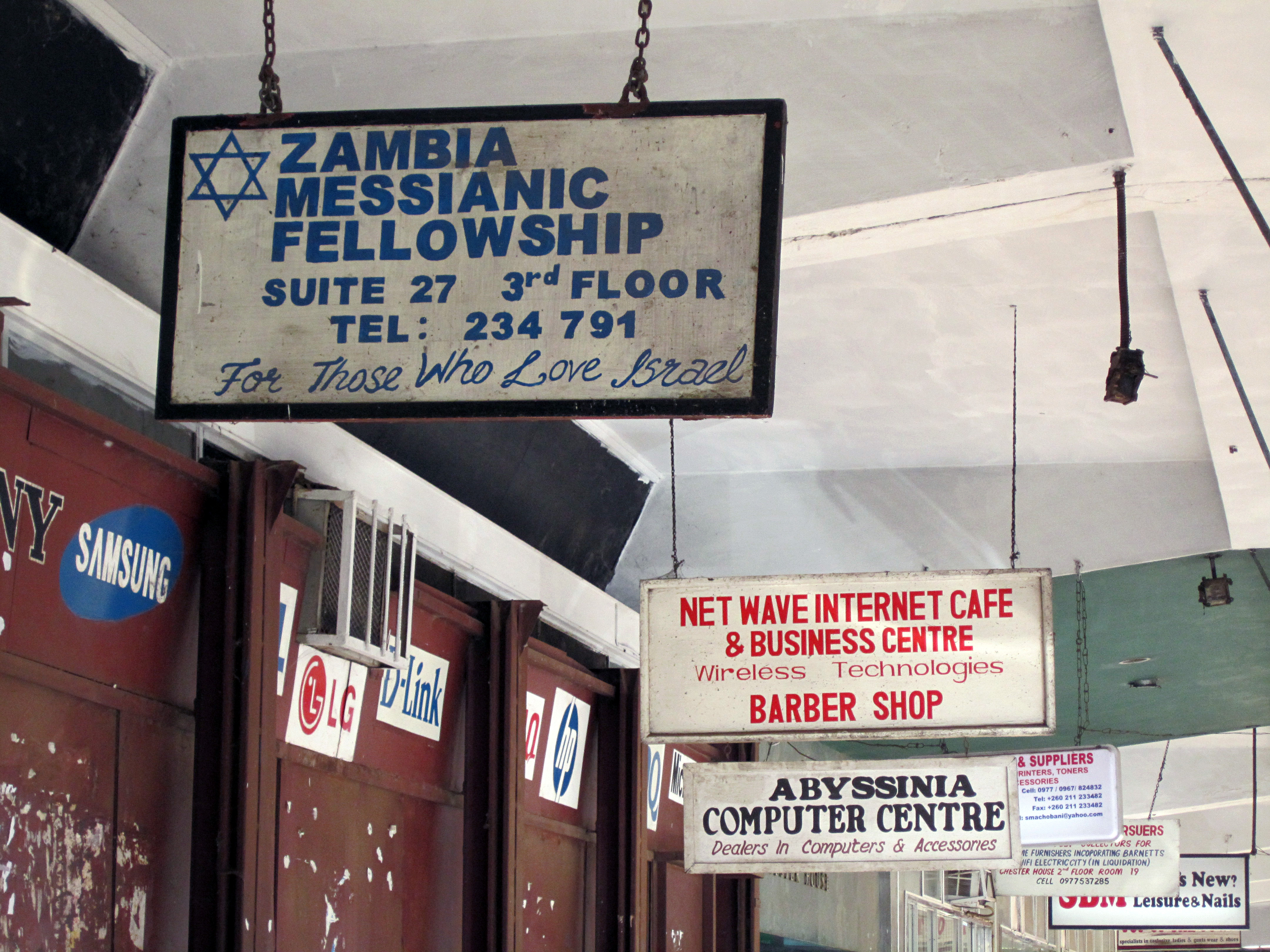
- Signs in English, Lusaka
- Official: English
- Recognised: Bemba, Kaonde, Lozi, Lunda, Luvale, Nyanja, Tonga
- Vernacular: Zambian English
- Minority: Bwile, Chokwe, Ila, Kuhane, Kunda, Kwangwa, Lala-Bisa, Lamba, Lenje, Luyana, Mambwe-Lungu, Mbamba Bay, Mbowe, Mbukushu, Mbunda, Mwanga, Nkangala, Nkoya, Nsenga, Shanjo, Shona, Soli, Tabwa, Tumbuka, Wanda, Yao
- Signed: Zambian Sign Language
- Keyboard layout: QWERTY

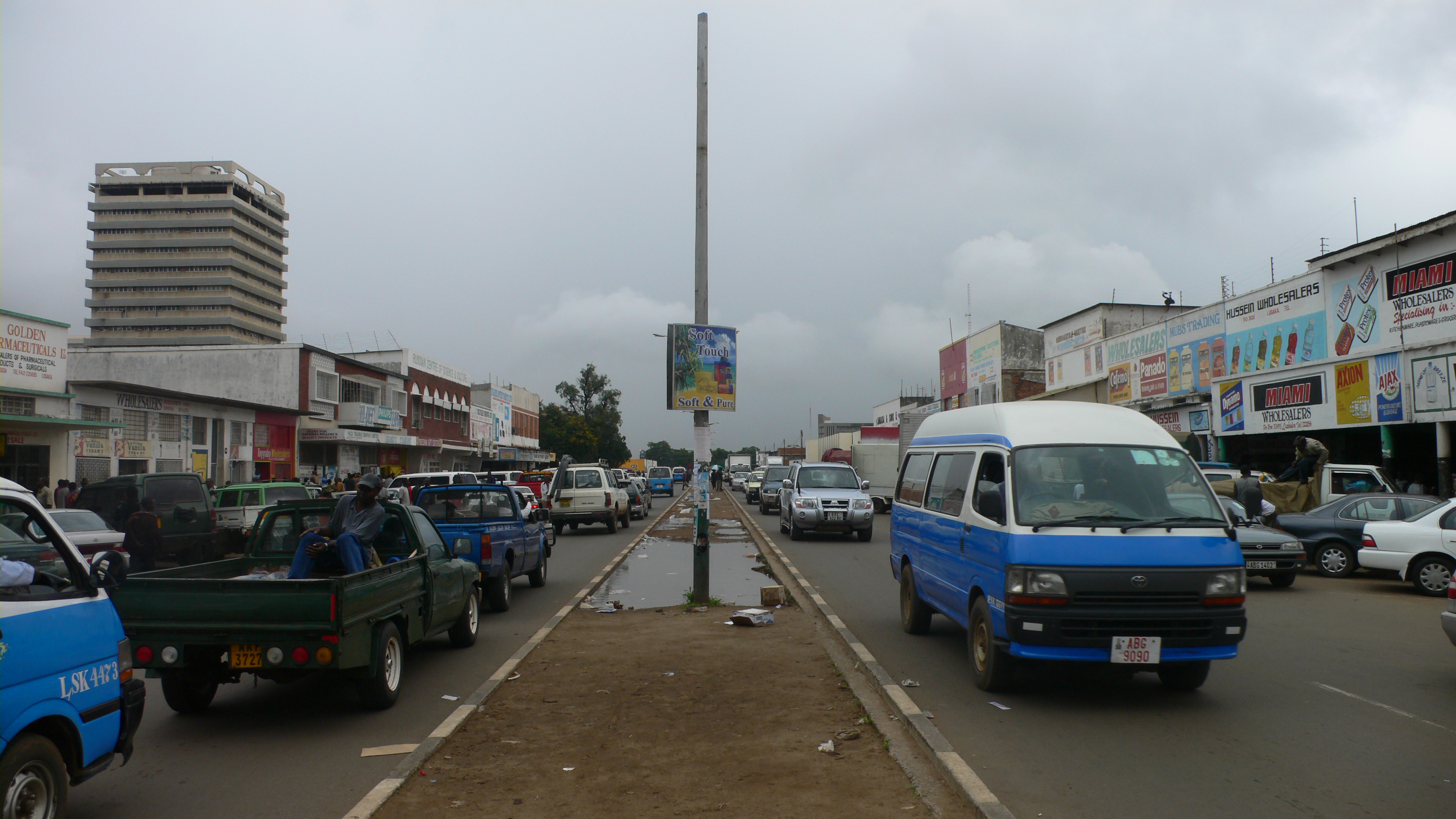
Street view in Lusaka with signs in English.

Zambia has several major indigenous languages, all members of the Bantu family, as well as Khwedam, Zambian Sign Language, several immigrant languages and the pidgins Settla and Fanagalo. English is the official language and the major language of business and education.

== Indigenous Zambian languages ==
Zambia has some 40 indigenous languages, some of which have a long history in Zambia, while others, such as Silozi, arose as a result of 18th- and 19th-century migrations. All of Zambia's major languages by native-speaker population are members of the Bantu family and are closely related to one another.

Seven native languages are officially recognised as regional languages. Together, these represent the major languages of each province: Bemba (Northern Province, Luapula, Muchinga and the Copperbelt), Nyanja (Lusaka and the Eastern Province), Lozi (Western Province), Tonga and Lozi (Southern Province), and Kaonde, Luvale and Lunda (Northwestern Province). These seven languages are used, together with English, in early primary schooling and in some government publications. A common orthography was approved by the Ministry of Education in 1977.

The most common languages spoken by the majority of the population in Zambia are Bemba, followed by Nyanja and Tonga, while some other languages such as Luvale, Tumbuka, Lunda and the rest are spoken in their local localities of the country.

== Zambian English ==
English, the former colonial language, serves as a common language among educated Zambians. At independence in 1964, English was declared the national language. English is the first language of only 2% of Zambians but is the most commonly used second language.

The English spoken in Zambia has some distinctive features, such as the omission of certain object pronouns that would be obligatory in Western English ("Did you reach?"), the simplification of some phrasal verbs ("throw" instead of "throw away"), subtle differences in the usage of auxiliary verbs such as "should", simplification of vowel sounds (some Zambians may regard "taste" and "test" as homophones), and the incorporation of particles derived from Zambia's indigenous languages (such as chi "big/bad" and ka "little"). Zambian English also incorporates South African words such as braai for "barbecue".

== Widely Used Language of Communication, Percentage distribution of major language groups ==
As defined in the 2010 Census, a Widely Used Language of Communication "... is the language which is mostly spoken by an individual during their day to day communication, at work, with neighbours or in market places. This is simply the language spoken or most often spoken by the individual." In other words, multilingual people are only counted as speaking their primary daily language.

	Bemba	Nyanja	Tonga	Kaonde	Barotse	Tumbuka	Mambwe	English	Other
1990	39.9%	20.1%	14.8%	8.8%	7.5%	3.7%	3.4%	1.1%	0.8%
2000	38.5%	20.6%	13.9%	9.7%	6.9%	3.2%	3.2%	1.7%	4.3%
2010	31.0%	25.3%	17.5%	6.6%	9.3%	3.3%	3.2%	1.7%	0.3%

Source: 2010 Census

== List of languages ==
The established languages of Zambia are:

- Aushi
- Bemba
- Bwile
- Chichewa
- Chokwe
- Congo Swahili
- English
- Fwe
- Ila
- Kaonde
- Khwedam
- Kuhane
- Kunda
- Lala-Bisa
- Lamba
- Lambya
- Lenje
- Lozi
- Luchazi
- Lunda
- Luvale
- Luyana
- Mambwe-Lungu
- Mashi
- Mbowe
- Mbukushu
- Mbunda
- Nkoya
- Nsenga
- Nyamwanga
- Nyiha
- Nyika
- Pidgin Zulu
- Sala
- Settla
- Shona
- Simaa
- Soli
- Taabwa
- Tonga
- Totela
- Tumbuka
- Yao
- Yauma
- Zambian Sign Language

== Bibliography ==
- Chimuka, S. S. (1977). Zambian languages: orthography approved by the Ministry of Education. Lusaka : National Educational Company of Zambia (NECZAM).
- Kashoki, Mubanga E. and Ohannessian, Sirarpa. (1978) Language in Zambia. London: International African Institute.
- Kashoki, Mubanga E. (1981). Harmonization of African languages: standardization of orthography in Zambia in In African Languages: Proceedings of the Meeting of Experts on the Transcription and Harmonization of African Languages, Niamey (Niger), 17–21 July 1978, (pp. 164–75). Paris: UNESCO.
- Kashoki, Mubanga E. (1990) The Factor of Language in Zambia. Lusaka: Kenneth Kaunda Foundation.
- Marten, Lutz; Kula, Nancy C. (2008) "One Zambia, One Nation, Many Languages" in Simpson, A. ed., 2008, Language and National Identity in Africa, Oxford: OUP, 291–313.
- Chanda, Vincent M. and Mkandawire, Sitwe Benson. (2013). 'Speak Zambian Languages'. Lusaka: UNZAPRESS
- Mkandawire, S. B. (2017). "Familiar Language Based Instruction versus Unfamiliar Language for the Teaching of Reading and Writing Skills: A Focus on Zambian Languages and English at two Primary Schools in Lusaka". Zambian Journal of Language Studies, 1(1), 53–82. ISSN 2415-668X
- Mkandawire, Sitwe Benson (2017b). "Terminological Dilemma on Familiar language based instruction and English language: A reflection on Language of Initial Literacy Instruction in Zambia" Journal of Lexicography and Terminology, 1(1), 45–58. ISSN 2517-9306
- Tambulukani, Geoffrey Kazembe (2015). "First Language Teaching of Initial Reading: Blessing or Curse for the Zambian Children under Primary Reading Programme?" Ph.D. thesis, University of Zambia.
- Tordoff, William (ed.) (1974) Politics in Zambia. Manchester: Manchester University Press.
- Republic of Zambia. Constitution of Zambia 1991 (as amended by Act no. 18 of 1996).
