= Fwe language =

Bantu language of Southern Africa

Fwe
- Chifwe
- Region: Zambezi region, Namibia and Western Province, Zambia
- Native speakers: 15,000
- Language family: Niger–Congo?: Atlantic–Congo; Benue–Congo; Southern Bantoid; Bantu; Botatwe; Subia; Fwe

Language codes
- ISO 639-3: fwe
- Glottolog: fwee1238
- Guthrie code: K.402

- Person: Mufwe
- People: Mafwe or Bafwe

The Fwe language, also known as Chifwe, is a Bantu language spoken by the Fwe people (Mafwe or Bafwe) in Namibia and Zambia. It is closely related to the Subia language, Chisubia, and is one of several Bantu languages that feature click consonants.

== Classification ==
Fwe is part of the Bantu language family, a sub-branch of the Niger-Congo family. Maho (2009) classifies it as K.402, sharing the K.40 category with Ikuhane and Totela. Bohoe (2009) classifies it as Bantu Botatwe, along with Toka, Leya, Ila, Tonga, Sala, Lenje, Lundwe, and Soli.

== Regional variation ==
Main phonological differences between Zambian and Namibian Fwe, as noted by both the speakers and seen in the data:

Zambian Fwe	Namibian Fwe
loss of clicks	maintenance of clicks
overgeneralization of /l/	[l] only as conditioned allophone of /r/
epenthetic [h] frequently used	epenthetic [h] rarely used

Morphological differences between Zambian and Namibian Fwe:

	Zambian Fwe	Namibian Fwe
past	na-	a-
reflexive	kí-	rí-
remote past	na-	ni-
remote future	na-	(á)rá-
inceptive	sha-	shi-
connective	PP - o	PP - a
persistive	shí-	shí-/-sí-
negative imperative	ásha-	ásha-/-ása-
negative infinitive	shá-	shá-/-sá-
negative subjunctive	sha	sha-/-sa-
near future	mbo-/mba-	mbo

== Phonology ==
Fwe syllables consist, at most, of a consonant, a glide, and a vowel.

=== Consonants ===
Consonant inventory of Fwe
		Bilabial	Dental/ Labiodental	Alveolar	Postalveolar/ Palatal	Velar	Glottal
Click	plain		ᵏǀ ᶢǀ				
Click	prenasalized		ⁿ̥ǀ ⁿǀ				
Nasal		m		n	ɲ	ŋ	
Stop	voiceless	p		t		k	
Stop	voiced	b		d		ɡ	
Stop	prenasalized	ᵐp ᵐb		ⁿt ⁿd		ᵑk ᵑɡ	
Fricative	voiceless		f	s	ʃ		h
Fricative	voiced	β	v	z	ʒ		
Fricative	prenasalized		ᶬf ᶬv	ⁿs ⁿz	ᶮʃ		
Affricate	voiceless				tʃ		
Affricate	voiced				dʒ		
Affricate	prenasalized				ᶮtʃ ᶮdʒ		
Tap				ɾ			
Glide					j	w	

- The plosives /p b d g/ are considered peripheral phonemes, as they are relatively infrequent in the lexicon. They are not reflexes of *p, *b, *d and *g as reconstructed for Proto-Bantu, but mainly appear in loanwords.
- Though there are numerous cases where /h/ contrasts with zero, i.e. where /h/ can-not be omitted, [h] is also often used as an epenthetic consonant, in which case it freely commutes with [w], [j] and zero. Phonemic /h/, on the other hand, cannot commute with a glide nor can it be dropped.

=== Vowels ===
Fwe has five contrastive vowel phonemes: /i u ɛ ɔ a/. Vowels contrast in length, as seen in the minimal pairs below:

ku-kúr-a
INF-grow-FV
to grow

ku-kúːr-a
INF-shift-FV
to shift, move house

The placement and proximity of vowels in Fwe influences tonal processes. Vowels placed at the beginning of a word are known as augments (glossed as AUG) and final vowels are those placed at the end of a word (glossed as FV). Tone is also affected by whether a vowel is lengthened or deleted, as well as how sounds and words are positioned together within and across morphemic boundaries.

=== Tone ===
Fwe is a tonal language, as are most languages within the Bantu family. Pitch differences on the vowel contribute to differing meanings. This contrastive tonal system is demonstrated by the existence of minimal pairs:

ku-hár-a
INF-live-FV
to live

ku-har-a
INF-scrape-FV
to scrape

Fwe has two underlying tones, high and low. At the surface level, these tones may be articulated as high, low, falling, or downstepped high tone. Specific tone usage in Fwe, namely the underlying high tone, is subject to several processes which affect its placement relative to other tones within morphemes or phrases. These tonal processes determine whether high or low tones are used in succession.

Tones in Fwe occur on the mora of words. Vowel combinations consist of either one (for short vowels) or two morae (for long or lengthened vowels). Tonal processes will be affected by the overall vowel environment as well as morae.

There is grammatical necessity to correct tonal placement. Tones will impact many elements of Fwe language, including tense-aspect-mood marking, which utilizes high floating or "melodic tone." Placing high tones on augments, as well as on specific areas of inflected verb stems, will impart TAM information. Additionally, subject markers prefixed to verbs in main clauses will have a low tone, while subject markers prefixed to verbs for relative clauses will have a high tone. These subject markers are otherwise identical in their syntactic, vowel and consonant makeup.

== Grammar ==
There are 19 noun classes, numbered one to eighteen, including class 1a. These are marked as prefixes on the noun. Adjectives take on the augment and prefix when in agreement with a noun. A table of noun classes is given by Gunnink (2018):

Class prefixes
Noun class	Nominal prefix	Augment	Pronominal/Subject/ Object prefix	Subject prefix	Example	Gloss
I	mu- / mw- / m-	o-	u- / zyu-	a-	mù-ntù	person
Ia	ø- / N-	o-	u- / zyu-	a-	ø-ŋàngà	doctor
2	ba- / b-	a-	ba-	ba-	bà-ntù	people
3	mu- / mw- / m-	o-	u-	u-	mù-bìrì	body
4	mi-	e-	i-	i-	mì-bìrì	bodies
5	ø- / r(i)-	e-	ri-	ri-	ànjà	hand
6	ma- / m-	a-	ma- / a- (OBJ)	a-	mà-ànjà	hands
7	ci- / c-	e-	ci-	ci-	cì-púrà	chair
8	zi / z- / bi-	e-	zi-	zi-	zì-púrà / bì-púrà	chairs
9	N- / ø-	e-	i- / yi- (OBJ)	i-	n-gìnà	louse
10	N- / ø-	e-	zi-	zi-	n-gìnà	lice
11	ru- / rw- / r-	o-	ru-	ru-	rù-rîmì	tongue
12	ka-	a-	ka-	ka-	kà-shùtò	fish hook
13	tu-	o-	tu-	tu-	tù-shùtò	fish hooks
14	bu- / bw- / b-	o-	bu-	bu-	bù-zyûmì	life
15	ku-	o-	ku-	ku-	kù-bôkò	arm
16	ha-		ha-	ha-	hà-mù-shânà	on the back
17	ku-		ku-	ku	kù-rù-wà	at the field
18	mu		mu-	mu-	mù-mù-nzì	in the village
1SG			ndi-			
2SG			u-			
1PL			tu-			
2PL			mu- / mí (OBJ)			

There are four distance distinctions, or series, within demonstratives. Possessives can be expressed as suffixes on the noun they modify. Tense, aspect, negation, modality, subject, object, locatives, and spatial deixis can all be marked on the verb. Subject marking on the verb is obligatory. The general verb structure is pre-initial - subject - post-initial - object - root - derivational suffixes - pre-final - final vowel - clitic.

Fwe follows an SVO, or Subject Verb Object order. Constituents can be moved to the front of a clause to be marked for topic, or to the end to be marked for definiteness. An example of the word order can be found below:

o-mu-sá na-hib-í e-N-jinga i-angú
AUG-NP1-thief SM1.PST-steal-NPST.PFV AUG-NP9-bicycle PP9-POSS.1SG
[Subject] [Verb] [Object] [Possessive]
‘A thief has stolen my bicycle.’ (NF_Elic15)

Fwe Causative constructions are constructed through indirect causation semantically and use a complex predicate strategy. There is overt coding on the verb with a dedicated causative affix being added to indicate causality. For an intransitive verb, adding the causitive affix will make the word transitive, as shown with the verb "to burn" below:

ndi-tuHmbus-á̲ o-mu-riro
SM1.SG-burn.CAUS-FV AUG-NP3-fire
‘I light the fire.’ (NF_Elic15)

=== Clausal constructions ===
Fwe's unmarked or "canonical" word order for a main clause is SVO (see above). Parts of the clause can be shifted to the left- or rightmost boundaries of a sentence (left- or right dislocation in Fwe marking topic or definiteness, respectively). Tonal processes in these cases move accordingly: underlying high tones become falling tones, while final high tones move to the penultimate mora. Left-dislocated elements are typically adjuncts denoting locative or object information, setting up the topic for following clauses.

Right-dislocated elements can involve subjects (typically human) or objects, and are rendered definite by their position. While both dislocation types reference the main clause verb, right-dislocated elements are not as topicalized as left-dislocated elements.

==== Subordinate clauses ====
Details of time and progression, as well as those for participants and surrounding referents, can be modified or introduced into a narrative following the main clause. Subordinate clauses, also known as dependent clauses, attach to and relate information about or lead from a main clause and its elements, usually by means of a conjunctive construction.

Fwe utilizes a remote past perfective tense form (RPP). This form "marks remoteness"; namely, the point of time in which the clause is framed to have occurred long before it is uttered. This construction applies a prefix (na-/ni-) to the subject marker at the beginning of a clause, as well as a past-tense prefix (a-) to the word after the initial. The final vowel (-a), considered the "default" in Fwe, completes the boundary for an RPP construction. RPP constructions for subordinate clauses can vary between Namibian and Zambian versions of Fwe (the latter variation commonly being ne- instead of na-.

ka-rí ndi-mé ne-ndí̲-a-ya-á̲
NEG-be COP-pers1SG REM-sm1SG-PST-kill-FV<REL>
‘It wasn't me who broke it.’ (NF_Elic14)

RPP constructions can also be used in subordinate clauses with the subjunctive to show an event to occur far into the future; for contrasting points in time; and for other perfective uses, where the clause is taken as a temporally indivisible unit. Although near future verb constructions exist in Fwe, they cannot be negated, as semantically negation conflicts with verbal focus combined with remote prefixes. As a result, subordinate clauses demonstrating near future or negation use present tense or perfective subjunctive forms:

*a-ba-bara a-bó mbo-bá̲-hur-é̲ shunu
AUG-np2-visitor AUG-DEM.iii2 NEAR.FUT-sm2-arrive-PFV.SBJV today
Intended: ‘The visitors who will arrive today…’

a-ba-bara a-bó bá̲-hur-á̲ shunu
AUG-np2-visitor AUG-DEM.iii2 sm2.REL-arrive-FV today
‘The visitors who will arrive today…’ (NF_Elic15)

For points in time that are nearer to utterance time, but otherwise not specified, the RPP construction is applied, minus the na-/ni-/ne- prefix. This construction implies that can be as much as 50 years prior, to as recently as the day before, the clause is spoken. However, with verbs denoting experience, the near past perfective is used:

shi-bá-ná-zyib-i bá-mú-kwámé u-enú
inc-sm2-pst-know-npst.pfv np2-np1-man pp1-poss2PL
‘Your husband has now become aware.’ (NF_Narr15)

==== Coordination in Complex Causal Constructions ====
Fwe uses a comitative prefix in order to denote same subject coordination clauses with a deranking strategy on the posterior clause. This means that the comitative prefix "nV-" can be used to create complex clauses. V in "nV" refers to any given vowel, as the comitative prefix vowel is dependent on the following vowel of the word in which it is linking to. Deranking the posterior clause in Fwe causes the posterior sentence to lose conjugation of the verb, leaving the clause in the infinitive as shown below.

ní̲-ndi-a-rwár-a zyóna ne=shúnu ndi-shiH-rwaHr-í̲te
PST-SM.1SG-PST-be_sick-FV yesterday COM=today SM.1SG-PER-be_sick-STAT
‘I got sick yesterday, and I am still sick today.’ (NF_Elic17)

For a different subject coordination clause, the clauses are juxtaposed together using a zero coordination strategy, and both clauses are treated as balanced. A balanced coordination means that both clauses are grammatically equal.

ku-aazyá o-zyo á̲-shak-á o-ku-fw-á tu-enshé tu-shak-á bu-mí
SM17-be_not AUG-DEM.III1 SM1.REL-want-FV AUG-INF-die-FV PP.1PL-all SM.1PL-want-FV NP14-life
‘There is no one who wants to die, we all want to be alive.’ (NF_Song17)
