= List of Zambian tribes =

Zambia has many indigenous tribes spread across its ten provinces. This is an incomplete list of these tribes arranged in alphabetical order:

- Ambo
- Aushi
- Bemba
- Bisa
- Bwile
- Chewa
- Chikunda
- Chokwe
- Cishinga
- Goba
- Ila
- Imilangu
- Iwa
- Kabende
- Kaonde
- Kosa
- Kunda
- Kwandi
- Kwandu
- Kwangwa
- Lala
- Lamba
- Lambya (Tanzania, Zambia and Malawi)
- Lenje
- Leya
- Lima
- Liyuwa
- Lozi
- Luano
- Luchazi
- Lumbu
- Lunda
- Lundwe
- Lungu
- Luunda
- Luvale
- Luyana
- Makoma
- Mambwe
- Mashasha
- Mashi
- Mbowe
- Mbukushu
- Mbumi
- Mbunda
- Mbwela
- Mijikenda
- Mukulu
- Mulonga
- Mwanga
- Namwanga (Tanzania, Zambia and Malawi)
- Ndembu
- Ngoni
- Ng'umbo
- Nkoya
- Nsenga
- Nyengo
- Nyika (Tanzania, Zambia and Malawi)
- Sala
- Seba
- Senga
- Shanjo
- Shila
- Simaa
- Soli
- Subiya
- Swahili spoken in most countries in east, south, central etc
- Swaka
- Tabwa
- Tambo
- Toka
- Tonga
- Totela
- Tumbuka
- Twa
- Unga
- Wandya Zambia and Malawi
- Yao
- Yombe
