= Malcolm Guthrie =

British linguist (1903–1972)

- Born: 10 February 1903; Hove, Sussex, UK
- Died: 22 November 1972 (aged 69)

Academic background
- Education: Imperial College, London

Malcolm Guthrie (10 February 1903 – 22 November 1972) was an English linguist who specialized in Bantu languages.

Guthrie was a foremost professor of Bantu languages at the School of Oriental and African Studies (SOAS) in London. He is known primarily for his classification of Bantu languages, Guthrie 1971. The classification, though based more on geography than linguistic relatedness, is nonetheless the most widely used. Together with the Belgian linguist Achille Émile Meeussen (1912–1978), he is regarded as one of the two leading Bantu specialists of the second half of the 20th century.

== Early life and career ==
Malcolm Guthrie was born in Hove, Sussex, England, the son of a Scottish father and a mother of Dutch ancestry. After schooling at Ipswich, he took a degree in metallurgy at Imperial College, London.

Shortly afterwards, however, he felt called to the Baptist ministry. He served for two years as minister of a Baptist church in Rochester, during which time he married Margaret Near, the daughter of a Baptist minister at a neighbouring church. In 1932 he went as a missionary to Kinshasa in the then Belgian Congo, where he worked for the next eight years. It was here that he studied the Lingala language and several other local languages.

== Works ==
Guthrie's first major work was The Classification of the Bantu Languages (1948), in which he tried to define the set of Bantu languages. It was in this work that the first version of the famous coding of these languages into geographical "zones" first appeared.

The magnum opus of Guthrie is Comparative Bantu, which appeared in 4 volumes published in 1967 (volume 1), 1970 (volumes 3 and 4), and 1971 (volume 2). The 4 volumes provide not only a genetic classification but also a reconstruction of Proto-Bantu as the Proto-language of the Bantu language family. For his reconstruction, Guthrie drew data from 28 so-called "test languages" that were picked more or less randomly. It has been argued, for example by Wilhelm Möhlig, that this renders his reconstruction unreliable, since the reconstructed forms, and hence the genetic tree, would be different if one changed the selection of languages.

Guthrie also published extensively on a wide range of Bantu languages, including Lingala, Bemba, Mfinu, and Teke.

== Selected works ==
- Guthrie, Malcolm (1948). The classification of the Bantu languages. London: Oxford University Press for the International African Institute. OCLC 184799.
- Guthrie, Malcolm (1967–1971). Comparative Bantu: an introduction to the comparative linguistics and prehistory of the Bantu languages. Vol. 1–4. Farnborough: Gregg Press.
- Carrington, John F., ed. (1988). Lingala Grammar and Dictionary: English-Lingala, Lingala-English (in English and Lingala). London: Baptist Missionary Society. ISBN 9780901733085. OCLC 28376577.
