= Leonard Thompson (historian) =

American historian

Leonard Monteath Thompson (born 6 March 1916, in Cranborne, Dorset, England – died June 2004) was Charles J. Stillé Professor of History Emeritus at Yale University and director of the former Yale Southern African Research Program. He is known for his work on the formation of the Union of South Africa and the two-volume Oxford History of South Africa, a collaboration with N.M. Wilson. He has written and edited several books, including The Political Mythology of Apartheid, The Frontier in History (with Howard R. Lamar), A History of South Africa, and South African Politics (with Andrew Prior), all published by Yale University Press.

== Life ==
Born in England in 1916, Thompson was educated in both England and South Africa, and was a Rhodes Scholar at Oxford University from 1937 to 1939. He was a lieutenant in the Royal Navy during the Second World War, and was awarded several medals for his service. After the war, he taught at the University of Cape Town. Thompson was a professor at Yale University between 1969 and 1986, and was the founding director of the Yale Southern African Research Program, directing it from 1977 until 1994. Thompson wrote several books and articles, including The Unification of South Africa and Survival in Two Worlds: Moshoeshoe of Lesotho, 1786-1870. In the 1950s, Thompson was a founding member of the South Africa Liberal Party, although he left the country in 1961, in the wake of the 1960 Sharpeville massacre. In June 2004, Thompson died after a brief illness.

== Selected publications ==
=== Books ===
- Thompson, Leonard (1960). The unification of South Africa, 1902-1910. Oxford: Clarendon Press.
- ——, ed. (1969). African societies in Southern Africa: historical studies. New York: Praeger.
- Wilson, Monica; ——, eds. (1969). The Oxford history of South Africa: South Africa to 1870. Vol. 1. Oxford University Press.
- Wilson, Monica; ——, eds. (1971). The Oxford history of South Africa: South Africa 1870–1966. Vol. 2. Oxford: Clarendon Press.
- —— (1975). Survival in two worlds: Moshoeshoe of Lesotho, 1786-1870. Oxford: Clarendon Press. ISBN 978-0-19-821693-3.
- Lamar, Howard; ——, eds. (1981). The frontier in history: North America and Southern Africa compared. Yale University Press. ISBN 978-0-300-02742-6.
- ——; Prior, Andrew (1982). South African politics. Yale University Press. ISBN 978-0-300-02779-2.
- —— (1985). The political mythology of apartheid. Yale University Press. ISBN 978-0-300-03368-7.
- —— (1990). A history of South Africa. Wynberg, Sandton: Radix. ISBN 978-0-947024-35-2.

=== Articles ===
- —— (March 1962). "Afrikaner Nationalist Historiography and the Policy of Apartheid". The Journal of African History. 3 (1): 125–141. doi:10.1017/S0021853700002772.
