= ZSL =

ZSL may refer to:

- Zoological Society of London, devoted to the worldwide conservation of animals and their habitats
- Zjednoczone Stronnictwo Ludowe, the United People's Party, a Polish political party 1949–1989
- Zero shutter lag, in photography
- Zambian Sign Language
- Zimbabwean sign languages
- Saudi Professional League, the top football league in Saudi Arabia
