= A. E. Meeussen =

Belgian linguist (1912–1978)

Achille Emile Meeussen, also spelled Achiel Emiel Meeussen, or simply A. E. Meeussen (as he generally signed his articles) (1912–1978) was a distinguished Belgian specialist in Bantu languages, particularly those of the Belgian Congo, Rwanda and Burundi. Together with the British scholar Malcolm Guthrie (1903–1972) he is regarded as one of the two leading experts in Bantu languages in the second half of the 20th century.

Meeussen was born at Sint-Pieters-Jette, Belgium on April 6, 1912, and died at Louvain on February 8, 1978, at the age of 65.

== Education and career ==
A. E. Meeussen studied classical philology at the Catholic University of Louvain (Leuven) in Belgium, where he submitted his PhD thesis on Indo-European ablaut in 1938. After studying at the School of Oriental and African Studies in London, in 1950 he was appointed to the staff of the Royal Museum for Central Africa in Tervuren, Belgium; he was director of the linguistics department of the museum from 1958–77. He was also professor of African linguistics at the University of Louvain from 1952–62 and later professor at Leiden University in the Netherlands from 1964–77.

== Research ==
=== Languages studied ===
Among the Bantu languages which Meeussen described or studied were Luba-Kasayi (1951), Ombo (1952), Kirundi (1952), Laadi (1953), Bangubangu (1954), Bemba (1954), Luganda (1955), Shambala (1955), Sotho (1958), Lega (1962), Tonga (1963), and Yao (1971). His descriptions of the grammar of Ombo, Bangubangu, and Rundi were written as a result of fieldwork notes which he made on a visit to Rwanda-Urundi and Maniema district of the Belgian Congo in 1950-51; the information on Lega was obtained from visitors to the Museum. He also wrote articles on other languages, including the American Indian languages Cheyenne and Cree (1962).

=== Tonal theory ===
Meeussen was especially interested in the tones of the Bantu languages, and is famous for his discovery of Meeussen's rule, which describes how in some circumstances a sequence of two High tones (HH) in a word changes to High + Low (HL). He is said to have had an exceptional ability to hear and reproduce the sounds of the languages he studied.

=== Historical linguistics ===
In addition to studying individual languages, Meeussen also made major contributions to the comparative study of Bantu and to the reconstruction of the phonemes, grammar, and vocabulary of Proto-Bantu. His 40-page article "Bantu Grammatical Reconstructions" of 1967 succinctly outlines the main facts of Proto-Bantu grammar as they were known at that time. In 1969 he was responsible for founding the database "Bantu Lexical Reconstructions" still maintained today by the Tervuren museum.

== Works ==
- Meeussen, Achille E. (1943). "Syntaxis van het Tshiluba". Kongo-Overzee 9 (1-3): 81-263.
- Meeussen, Achille E. (1948). "Guthrie, M. The classification of the Bantu languages (review)". Kongo-Overzee 14 (5): 314-318.
- Meeussen, Achille E. (1950). "De tonen van de imperatief in het Ciluba (Kasayi)". Kongo-Overzee 16 (2-3): 110-111.
- Meeussen, Achille E. (1951). "Tooncontractie in het Ciluba (Kasayi)". Kongo-Overzee 17 (4-5): 289-291.
- Meeussen, Achille E. (1952). "Notes de grammaire rundi". Unpublished.
- Meeussen, Achille E. (1952). Esquisse de la langue ombo. MRAC, Annales du Musée royal du Congo belge 4, Tervuren.
- Meeussen, Achille E. (1952). "La voyelle des radicaux CV en bantou commun". Africa 22, 367-713
- Meeussen, Achille E. (1953). "Rundi-teksten van André Barumwete". Kongo-Overzee 19: 420-427.
- Meeussen, Achille E. (1953). "Notes sur la tonalité du nom en laadi". Etudes bantoues II 79-86.
- Meeussen, Achille E. (1953). "De talen van Maniema (Belgisch-Kongo)". Kongo-Overzee 19 (5): 385-390.
- Meeussen, Achille E. (1954). "Werkwoordafleiding in Mongo en Oerbantoe". Aequatoria 27 (3): 81-86.
- Meeussen, Achille E. (1954). "Klinkerlengte in het Oerbantoe". Kongo-Overzee 20:423–31. Translated as "Vowel Length in Proto-Bantu". Journal of African Languages and Linguistics 1(1): 1-8 · January 1979.
- Meeussen, Achille E. (1954). "Linguïstische schets van het Bangubangu". Tervuren, 1954, 53 p.
- Meeussen, Achille E. (1954). "The tones of prefixes in common Bantu." Africa 24 (1): 48-53.
- Meeussen, Achille E. (1954). "Le ton des extensions verbales en bantu." Orbis 10 (2): 424-427.
- Meeussen, Achille E. & Biebuyck, Daniel (1954). "Bembe-tekst". Kongo-Overzee 20 (1): 74-77.
- Meeussen, Achille E. (1955). "Tonunterschiede als Reflexe von Quantitätsunderschieden im Shambala". In Lukas J. (ed.) Afrikanistische Studien Diedriech Westermann zum 80. Geburtstag gewindet, 154-156.
- Meeussen, Achille E. (1955). "Les phonèmes du ganda et du bantu commun". Africa 25 (2): 170-180.
- Sharman, J.C. & Meeussen, A.E. (1955). "The representation of structural tones, with special reference to the tonal behaviour of the verb, in Bemba, Northern Rhodesia". Africa, 25, 393-404.
- Meeussen, Achille E. (1958). "Morphotonologie de la conjugaison en sotho". Unpublished.
- Meeussen, Achille E. (1958). "Morfotonologie van de vervoeging in het Suthu". Zaïre 12 (4): 383-392.
- Meeussen, Achille E. (1959). "Essai de grammaire rundi". Tervuren.
- Meeussen, Achille E. (1962). "Lega-teksten". Africana Linguistica 1: 75-97.
- Meeussen, Achille E. (1962). "De tonen van subjunktief en imperatief in het Bantoe." Africana Linguistica 1: 57-74.
- Meeussen, Achille E. (1962). "The independent order in Cheyenne". Orbis, 11: 260-288.
- Meeussen, Achille E. (1962). "The independent indicative in Mistassinl Crée". Studies in Linguistics, 1: 73-76.
- Meeussen, Achille E. (1963). "Meinhof's rule in Bantu." African Language Studies 3:25-29.
- Meeussen, Achille E. (1963). "Morphotonology of the Tonga verb". Journal of African Languages, 2.72–92.
- Meeussen, Achille E. (1964). "Notes suku". Unpublished, Tervuren.
- Meeussen, Achille E. (1965). "A preliminary tonal analysis of Ganda verb forms". Journal of African Languages 4 (2): 107-113.
- Meeussen, Achille E. (1966). "Syntactic tones of nouns in Ganda : a preliminary synthesis". In Lebrun Yvan (ed.) Recherches linguistiques en Belgique, 77-86.
- Meeussen, Achille E. (1967). "Notes on Swahili prosody". - Swahili, 37: 166-170.
- Meeussen, Achille E. (1967). "Bantu grammatical reconstructions." Africana Linguistica 3: 79-121.
- Meeussen, Achille E. (1969). "Bemerkungen über die Zahlwörter von sechs bis zehn in Bantusprachen". In Kalima na Dimi... . Stuttgart, 11-18.
- Meeussen, Achille E. (1970). "Tone typologies for West African languages". African Language Studies, 11: 266-271 .
- Meeussen, Achille E. (1971). "Notes on conjugation and tone in Yao." Africana Linguistica 5: 197-203.
- Meeussen, Achille E. (1971). Eléments de grammaire lega. Tervuren.
- Meeussen, Achille E. (1972). "Japanese accentuation as a restricted tone system". Japanese Linguistics 1: 267-270.
- Meeussen, Achille E. (1973). "Comparative Bantu: Test cases for method." African Language Studies 14: 6-18.
- Meeussen, Achille E. (1974). "Notes on tone in Ganda." Bulletin of the School of Oriental and African Studies 37 (1): 148-156.
- Meeussen, Achille E. (1974). "A note on global rules in Bangubangu tone". Studies in African Linguistics 5 (1): 95-99.
- Meeussen, Achille E. (1975). "Possible linguistic Africanisms." Language Sciences 35: 1-5
- Meeussen, Achille E. (1976). "Notes sur la tonalité du nom en laadi". Etudes Bantoues 2: 79-86.
- Meeussen, Achille E. (1977). "Trois pronominaux du mbala". Africana Linguistica 7: 359-374.
- Meeussen, Achille E. (1977). "Aspects préliminaires de l'étude du Punu (Guthrie B43)". Unpublished.
- Meeussen, Achille E. (1978). "Relative structures in Bantu". In Baumbach, E. J. M. (ed). Proceedings of the 2nd Africa Languages Congress. University of South Africa: 98-104.
- Meeussen, Achille E. (1980). Bantu Lexical Reconstructions. Tervuren: Musée Royal de l'Afrique Centrale. (Reprint of Meeussen's unpublished manuscript of 1969.)
- Meeussen, Achille E. (1980). "Le cas du mbagani. Mbagani et Lwalwa : deux anciens membres du complexe kongo au Kasayi?" In Bouquiaux, Luc (ed.) L'expansion bantue. - Actes du Colloque International du CNRS, Viviers (France), 4-16 avril 1977: 443-445.
- Meeussen, Achille E. (1980). "Problèmes spécifiques du grammaire comparé du bantou: exposé introductif". In Bouquiaux, Luc (ed.) L'expansion bantue. - Actes du Colloque International du CNRS, Viviers (France), 4-16 avril 1977: 457ff.
- Meeussen, Achille E. (1980). "Degrés d'archaïsme en bantou." - Communication faite au Colloque de Viviers (1977). - In Bouquiaux, Luc (ed.) L'Expansion bantoue: actes du Colloque international du CNRS, Viviers (France), 4-16 avril 1977: 595-600.

== Bibliography ==
- Bostoen, Koen; Bastin, Yvonne (2016). "Bantu Lexical Reconstructions". Oxford Handbooks online.
- Coupez, A. (1979). "In Memoriam A. E. Meeussen 1912-1978". African Studies 38 (2): 231-232.
- Coupez, A. (1980). "Hommage à A. Meeussen (1912-1978)". Africana Linguistica 8 (1): 1-22. (In French).
- Swiggers, Pierre (2006). "Meeussen, Achille Emile (1912-1978)". In Brown, E. K.; Asher, R. E.; Simpson, J. M. Y. (eds.) Encyclopedia of Language & Linguistics (2nd edition). Elsevier, pp. 759–760.
- Swiggers, Pierre (2009) "Meeussen, Achiel Emiel". In Stammerjohann, H. (ed). Lexicon grammaticorum. A Bio-Bibliographical Companion to the History of Linguistics, vol. 2: 993-994.
