= Susan Chitabanta =

Zambian novelist and short story writer

- Born: 1953 (68 years old)

Susan Chitabanta (born 1953) is a Zambian novelist and short story writer. She was the first woman novelist published by the Kenneth Kaunda Foundation.

== Works ==
- Behind the Closed Door (1992) ISBN 978-9982010412 226 pp
- Ombela umo ombela (2002) (short story) (Bemba) Lusaka : Zambia Women Writers' Association ISBN 9789982991179 63 pp.
- A Lie to a Liar (1997)

Published in The heart of a woman: Short stories from Zambia
