= Fwe =

Fwe or FWE may refer to:

- Fwe language
- Family-wise error rate
- Family Wrestling Entertainment
- Funkwerk Erfurt (FWE), renamed to VEB Mikroelektronik "Karl-Marx" Erfurt (MME) in 1983, a microelectronic design and development facility in the former East Germany
- "Finished With Engines" Command on ship's wheelhouse/engine-room telegraph.
