= Soli people =

The Soli people are one of the 72 official tribes of Zambia and speak the Soli language. They were the original inhabitants of the Lusaka area. and still constitute the majority in Lusaka Province. Many Soli engage in subsistence farming.

Traditional Soli ceremonies are held for purposes such as asking spirits of the ancestors for rain, and to thank them for a good harvest.

Prominent Soli people include Senior Chieftainess Nkomeshya Mukamambo II.

== See also ==
- Zambian traditional ceremonies#Lusaka
