= Bernard K. Mbenga =

South African historian

Bernard K. Mbenga is a historian at North-West University, South Africa, where he is a specialist in the history of the north-west of South Africa. He was one of the editors of the first volume of The Cambridge History of South Africa.

== Early life and education ==
Bernard Mbenga is Luvale-speaking and was born in Lukulu District in the Western Province of Zambia where he had his elementary, primary and secondary education from 1959 to 1970. He then went to Nkrumah Teachers' College in Kabwe and later the University of Zambia where he graduated with a BA with Education degree in 1977, majoring in History and English. He has a master's degree in African history from the University of York. He received his PhD from the University of South Africa for a thesis titled, The Bakgatla-Ba-Kgafela in the Pilanesberg District of the Western Transvaal from 1899 to 1931.

== Career ==
Mbenga joined North-West University in September 1987. He became an associate professor of history in 2005 and subsequently, a Full Professor.

Bernard Mbenga has a knowledge of the history and anthropology of the Setswana-speaking peoples, in particular the Bakgatla ba Kgafela of Rustenburg District. He has a PhD degree from the University of South Africa on the history of the Bakgatla ba Kgafela of the Pilanesberg. He has jointly authored (with Andrew Manson) a book entitled '"People of the Dew": The Bafokeng of the Phokeng-Rustenburg District of South Africa, from Early Times to 2000', (Jacana Press, Cape Town, 2010). He has published articles about various aspects of Batswana history in the Journal of Southern African Studies and the African Historical Review, The South African Historical Journal. He is on the editorial boards of two History journals, New Contree and Yesterday and Today, both based on the Vaal Campus of North West University. He is a past member of the editorial boards of the Journal of African History (2002 – 2007) (published by Cambridge University Press, England) and the South African Historical Journal (1999 – 2009).

He was also the author with Hermann Giliomee of New history of South Africa (2007). With Carolyn Hamilton and Robert Ross he was the editor of the first volume of The Cambridge History of South Africa, covering the period up to 1885. He co-wrote the chapters "The production of preindustrial South African history" (with Carolyn Hamilton and Robert Ross) and "From colonial hegemonies to imperial conquest, 1840–1880" (with Patrick Harries).

In 2014, he co-published (with Andrew Manson) a book called Land, Chiefs, Mining: South Africa’s North West Province Since 1840 (Wits University Press, Johannesburg).

His latest book, co-authored with Andrew Manson and Arianna Lissoni, Khongolose, A Short History of the ANC in the North West Province was published by Unisa Press, Pretoria, in 2016.

== Selected publications ==
- "Forced labour in the Pilanesberg: The flogging of Chief Kgamanyane by Commandant Paul Kruger, Saulspoort, April 1870", Journal of Southern African Studies, Volume 23, Issue 1, 1997, pp. 127–140.
- New history of South Africa. Tafelberg, Cape Town, 2007. (With Hermann Giliomee) (Also published in Afrikaans as Nuwe geskiedenis van Suid-Afrika)
- The Cambridge history of South Africa volume 1: From early times to 1885. 2009. (Edited with Carolyn Hamilton and Robert Ross) ISBN 9780521517942
- People of the dew: A history of the Bafokeng of Rustenburg District, South Africa, from early times to 2000. Jacana Media, 2011. (Editor with Andrew Manson) ISBN 9781770098251
- Land, chiefs, mining: South Africa's North West Province since 1840. Witwatersrand University Press, Johannesburg, 2014. (With Andrew Manson)
