= Lamba language =

Bantu language spoken in Zambia and DRC

Lamba
- Ichilamba
- Native to: Zambia, Democratic Republic of the Congo
- Region: Copperbelt
- Ethnicity: Lamba people
- Native speakers: 200,000 in Zambia (2010 census) unknown but smaller number in DRC
- Language family: Niger–Congo?: Atlantic–Congo; Benue–Congo; Bantoid; Bantu; Botatwe; South; Lamba

Language codes
- ISO 639-2: lam
- ISO 639-3: lam
- Glottolog: lamb1271
- Guthrie code: M.54,541,542

Lamba is a language found in Zambia and is commonly spoken in the Copperbelt. There are about 210,000 native speakers in the northern parts of Zambia and southern fringes of the Democratic Republic of the Congo. Lamba is also spoken in Lusaka, mainly because many speakers have migrated there for jobs. Lamba is a Bantu language. (In fact, "mu ntu" means "one person" in Lamba and "ba ntu" means "two or more people".) Depending on who does the counting, Zambia has between 42 and 78 local languages besides English – see Languages of Zambia for further details.

Maho (2009) lists the Lima (Bulima) and Temba varieties as distinct languages.

== Oral literature ==
In 1927, Clement Doke published Lamba Folklore, a collection of Lamba texts with English translations. The book contains 159 Lamba stories with English translations, 1695 proverbs, 144 riddles, and 95 songs (lyrics but no music). Here are some of the proverbs:

- "Awana-wa-nkasi wa li awene umuninga." "The brothers divided a peanut. (The story goes that two brothers were so fond of one another that, when one picked up a single peanut, he split it in half to share with his brother.)" (#148)
- "Cipa ca minwe, amenso a la wepa." "A gift is a thing for the hand, the eyes lie (i.e. don't consider a thing yours till you have it in your hand)." (#184)
- "Funda-wutesi e u wa." "The one who warns against slipping is the one who falls (i.e. practice what you preach)." (#239)
- "Iciwa mutima, iminwe ta iwa." "The thief is the heart, the fingers do not steal." (#327)

Here are some of the riddles:

- "Aka mina nyina? Mbe'cikwamu." "The little thing that swallows its mother? A match (for, when struck, the fire consumes the match-stick)." (#7)
- "Akanamaka kenda ku minefu, amafupa ka ka kakila-po? Mba kofwa. " "A little animal that journeys on its flesh, and its bones it ties on top? The snail." (#10)
- "Akasinga akapelele kwesu kwiwala? Mba kakumo." "The last little stump in our garden? The little toe." (#24)
- "Ici tonkala mu masala? Mbo'mutima." "That which digs about in the deserted village? The heart (the heart always turns to think of the past)." (#75)

== Phonology ==
Doke also published a study of the phonetics and phonology of Lamba in 1927.

=== Consonants ===
Letters shown in ⟨angle brackets⟩ are Doke's orthography where it differs from typical IPA transcriptions.

Lamba consonants
		Bilabial	Labiodental	Dental/ Alveolar	Palatal	Velar
Nasal		m	ɱ	n̪ ~ n (Note: Before /i/ and /j/, the occlusives /t, d, n/ are alveolar, while in all other positions they are dental. In addition, /t/ is aspirated [tʰ] in the alveolar position, while tenuis in the dental position.)	ɲ	ŋ
Plosive	tenuis			t̪ ~ tʰ	c	k
Plosive	aspirated	pʰ		t̪ ~ tʰ	cʰ	
Plosive	voiced	b		d̪ ~ d	ɟ	ɡ
Fricative		β ⟨ʋ⟩	f	s	ɕ ⟨ʆ⟩ (Note: Doke regards ⟨ʆ⟩ as a palatalized form of [ʃ], articulated further back than typical [ʃ], and having a characteristic [j]-glide. According to Doke, ⟨ʆ⟩ has approximately the same place of articulation as its non-sibilant homologue [ç], but with additional tongue grooving (a feature typically ascribed to more anterior sibilants).)	
Approximant				l	j	w
Flap				ɺ ⟨𝼑⟩		
