= Zambian Braille =

Braille systems used in Zambia

- Script type: alphabet
- Print basis: Bemba alphabet
- Languages: Bemba, Tumbuka, Chewa, Kaonde, Lozi, Lunda, Luvale, Tonga

Related scripts
- Parent systems: Braille: English Braille; Zambian Braille

Zambian Braille is any of several braille alphabets of Zambia. It has been developed for the languages Bemba, Tumbuka, Chewa, Lozi, Kaonde, Lunda, Luvale, and Tonga.

It is based on the 26 letters of the basic braille alphabet used for Grade-1 English Braille, so the print digraph ch is written as a digraph ⠉⠓ in braille as well. The letter ñ/ŋ [ŋ] of several of the print alphabets is distinguished from the sequence ng [ŋɡ] with an apostrophe: ⠝⠛⠄ ñ, as in the equivalent ng’ of print Bemba. The various alphabets, including digraphs that occur in any one of them, can thus be summarized as:

a	b	bb	c	cc		ch		d	e	f
g	h	hh	i	j	k	kh		kk		l
m	n	ñ, ŋ, ng’		o	p	ph		q	r	s
sh		th	t	u	v	w	x	y	z	⠀ (braille pattern blank)

Bemba has the basic alphabet plus ng’, sh, and in some orthographies ch in place of c. Chewa and Tumbuka has ch; Lozi, Lunda and Kaonde have ch, sh, and ñ; Luvale has ch, sh, ph, kh, th; and Tonga has ch, sh, bb, cc, hh, kk, and ŋ.

Numbers and punctuation are as in traditional English Braille.
