= Zambian traditional ceremonies =

Zambian Traditional Ceremonies.

== Central Province ==
Central Province
Ceremony	District	Chief	Tribe	Month
Ikubi Lya Loongo	Mumbwa	Senior Chief Shakumbila	Sala	July
Kulamba Kubwalo	Chibombo	Senior chief Mukuni	Lenje	October
Musaka Jikubi	Mumbwa	Chiefs Mumba & Kaindu	Kaonde	September
Ikubi Lya Malumbe-Munyama	Mumbwa	Chief Chibuluma	Kaonde Ila	October
Ichibwela Mushi	Mkushi	Bisa/Swaka/Lala Chiefs	Bisa/Swaka/Lala	September

== Copperbelt Province ==
Copperbelt Province
Ceremony	District	Chief	Tribe	Month
Chabalankata	Masaiti	Senior Chief Mushili	Lamba	November
Ukwilimuna	Mpongwe	Chieftainess Malembeka	Lamba	July
Nsengele Kununka	Mpongwe	Chief Machiya	Lamba	November

== Eastern Province ==
Eastern Province
Ceremony	District	Chief	Tribe	Month
N'cwala	Chipata	Paramount Chief Mpenzeni	Ngoni	February
Muganda	Lundazi	Senior Chief Magodi	Tumbuka	November
Kulamba	Katete	His Majesty Kalonga Gawa Undi	Chewa	last Saturday in August
Thenga Yyumo Zengani	Lundazi	Senior Chief Magodi	Tumbuka	October
Kulonga	Lundazi	Chief Mphamba	Tumbuka	August
Vimbuza	Chasefu	Senior Chief Magodi	Tumbuka	December
Tuwimba	Petauke	Senior Chief Kalindawalo	Nsenga	October
Kwenje	Chama	Senior Chief Kambombo	Senga	October
Malaila	Mambwe	Senior Chief Nsefu	Kunda	August

== Luapula Province ==
Luapula Province
Ceremony	District	Chief	Tribe	Month
Mutomboko	Kawambwa	Paramount Chief Mwata Kazembe	Lunda	July
Builile	Chienge	Senior Chief Puta	Bwile	September
Mabila	Chienge	Senior Chief Mununga	Shila	October
Chishinga Malaila	Kawambwa	Senior Chief Mushota	Chishinga	October
Kwanga	Samfya	Senior Chief Mwewa	Ngumbo	October
Chabuka	Mansa	Chief Matanda	Ushi	October

== Lusaka Province ==
Lusaka Province
Ceremony	District	Chief	Tribe	Month
Nkhombalyanga	Chongwe	Chieftainess Shikabeta	Soli	July
Dantho	Luangwa	Chief Mphuka	Chikunda	September
Chakwela Makumbi	Chongwe	Senior Chieftainess Nkhomeshya	Soli	September
Mbambara	Luangwa	Senior Chief Mburuma	Nsenga Luzi	November
Chibwela Kumushi	Luangwa	Chief Bunda Bunda	Soli	November
Kailala	Kafue	Chieftainess Chiawa	Goba	November
Chibwela Kumushi	Luangwa	Chief Mumpashya	Soli	November

== Northern Province ==
Northern Province
Ceremony	District	Chief	Tribe	Month
Ukusefya Pa Ng’wena	Mungwi	Paramount Chief Chitimukulu	Bemba	August
Mutomolo	Mbala	Mambwe/Lungu Chiefs	Mambwe	June
Mukula Pembe	Luwingu	Senior Chief Chunga	Bemba	August
Chisaka Chalubombo	Chilubi Island	Chief Chiwanangala	Bisa	September
Walamo	Mpulungu	Senior Chief Tafuna	Lungu	September
Itabwa Na-Akando	Kaputa	Chief Kaputa	Tabwa	April

== Muchinga Province ==
Muchinga Province
Ceremony	District	Chief	Tribe	Month
Vikamkanimba	Isoka	Senior Chief Muyombe	Tumbuka (Henga)	September
Chinamanongo	Mpika	Senior Chief Kopa	Bisa	September
Insonge	Shiwang'andu	Senior Chief Chibesakunda	Bisa	September
Chambo Chalutanga	Isoka	Chief Mwenechifungwe	Mfungwe	September
Mulasa	Nakonde	Chieftainess Nawaitwika	Namwanga	September
Bisa Malaila	Mpika	Chief Nabwalya	Bisa	September
Namulinda	Isoka	Mulekatembo	Nyika	October
Ngóndo	Isoka	Senior Chief Kafwimbi	Namwanga	November

== North-Western Province ==
North Western Province
Ceremony	District	Chief	Tribe	Month
Kufukwila	kalumbila	Chief Mukumbi	Kaonde	May
Insakwa yaba Kaonde	Solwezi/kalumbila	Kaonde Chiefs	Kaonde	May
Nsomo	Kasempa	Senior Chief Kasempa	Kaonde	June
Ntongo	Mufumbwe	Chief Kizela	Kaonde	July
Ukupupa	mushindamo	Senior Chief Kalilele	lamba	July
Chivweka	Kabompo	Chief Kalunga	Luchazi	July
Kunyata Ntanda	Solwezi	Chief Kapijimpanga	kaonde	August
Likumbi Lya Mize	Zambezi	Senior Chief Ndungu	luvale	August
Lunda Lubanza	Zambezi	Senior Chief Ishindi	Lunda	August
Lubinda Ntongo	kalumbila	Chief Mumena	Kaonde	September
Chisemwa Cha Lunda	Mwinilunga	Senior Chief Kanongesha	Lunda	September
Makundu	Mufumbwe	Chief Mushima	Kaonde	September
Mbunda Liyoyelo	Kabompo	Chief Chiyengele	Mbunda	September
Kuvuluka Kishakulu	kalumbila	Chief Matebo	Kaonde	September
Lukwakwa	Kabompo	Senior Chief Sikufele	Mbunda	October
Chidika Cha Mvula	Mwinilunga	Chief Kanyama	Lunda	October
Lwendela	Kasempa	Chief Ingwe	Kaonde	October

== Southern Province ==
Southern Province
Ceremony	District	Chief	Tribe	Month
Lwiindi Gonde	Monze	Chief Monze	Tonga	July
Maliko Malindi Lwiindi	Sinazongwe	Chief Sinazongwe	Tonga	August
Musumu Muyumu	Kalomo	Chief Sipatunyana	Tonga	August
Sikaumba	Namwala	Chief Mukobela	Ila	August
Lukuni Luzwa Buuka	Kalomo	Chief Musokotwane	Toka Leya	August
Kasanga Makonda	Kazungula	Chief Moomba	Nkoya	September
Guta Bweenza Bwe	Kazungula	Chief Nyawa	Tonga	September
Ikubi Lya BanaMunyati	Namwala	Chief Nalubamba	Ila/Lundwe	September
Shimunenga	Namwala	Chief Mungaila	Ila	October
Chungu	Kalomo	Chief Chikanta	Tonga	October
Maanzi Aabila Lwiindi	Kalomo	Chief Siachitema	Tonga	October
Lwiindi Sekute	Kazungula	Chief Sekute	Toka Leya	October
Bagande	Siavonga	Chief Simamba	Tonga	November
Koombaze Kamakonde	Kalomo	Chief Simwatachela	Tonga	November
Bene Mukuni	Kazungula	Chief Mukuni	Toka Leya	July & December

== Western Province ==
Western Province
Ceremony	District	Chief	Tribe	Month
Kuomboka	Limulunga/Mongu	The Litunga	Lozi	March
Kuomboka Nalolo	Senanga	Litunga La Mboela	Lozi	May
Kuomboka Libonda	Kalabo	Chieftainess Mboanjikana	Lozi	May
Kazanga	Kaoma	Chief Mutondo and Kahare	Nkoya	July
Lyenya	kalabo	Chief Mwene Mundu	Mbunda	August
