= Sabi languages =

Bantu language family

Sabi
- Geographic distribution: Eastern Zambia, Southeast DR-Congo
- Linguistic classification: Niger–Congo?: Atlantic–Congo; Benue–Congo; Southern Bantoid; Bantu (Zone M.40–50); Sabi

Language codes
- ISO 639-3: –
- Glottolog: bwil1246 (Bwile–Sabi) sabi1248 (Sabi)

The Sabi languages are a group of Bantu languages established by Christine Ahmed. They constitute much of Guthrie's Zone M. The languages, or clusters, along with their Guthrie identifications, are:

- Taabwa (Malungu, M40)
- South Sabi: Bemba–Unga (M40), Aushi, Lala-Bisa, Seba, Swaka (M50)

Bwile may belong here as well, as it is part of Guthrie's M40 group and Nurse (2003) does not note it as an exception, but it is not close to other languages and was not addressed by Ahmed. Similarly, although Spier (2020) focuses specifically on Aushi and includes an appendix comparing Sabi linguistic varieties, Bwile remains unaddressed due to limited available data.

Nurse and Philippson suspect that the Botatwe languages may be related.
