= Carolyn Hamilton (historian) =

South African anthropologist and historian

- Education: University of the Witwatersrand; Johns Hopkins University
- Scientific career
- Fields: anthropologist and historian
- Workplaces: University of Cape Town
- Thesis: Authoring Shaka: models, metaphors and historiography (1993)
- Website: www.apc.uct.ac.za/apc/nrf/professor-carolyn-hamilton

Carolyn Hamilton is a South African anthropologist and historian who is a specialist in the history and uses of archives. She is National Research Foundation of South Africa chair in archive and public culture at the University of Cape Town.

== Career ==
Hamilton was a professor of anthropology at the University of Witwatersrand. She was a member of the board of the South African History Archive and the inaugural Council of Robben Island. She was a founder member of the Gay and Lesbian Archive. She is a former speech-writer for Nelson Mandela and joined the Nelson Mandela Foundation's board of trustees in 2015. Currently, Hamilton is National Research Foundation of South Africa chair in archive and public culture at the University of Cape Town.

== Research ==
Hamilton's research interests lie in the use of archives following graduate work she did in the 1980s that alerted her to issues relating to the reliability, completeness and objectivity of archival sources in South Africa.

== Writing ==
Hamilton's 1998 book, Terrific majesty: The powers of Shaka Zulu and the limits of invention, dealt with the historiography of a particular episode in South African history. She was the editor, with Bernard K. Mbenga and Robert Rossof, of the first volume of The Cambridge History of South Africa (2009).

== Selected publications ==
- In the tracks of the Swazi past : a historical tour of the Ngwane and Ndwandwe kingdoms / compiled by Michael Westcott for the Swaziland Oral History Project. Macmillan Boleswa, Manzini, 1992. (Editor) ISBN 0333479084
- The Mfecane aftermath: Reconstructive debates in South African history. Witwatersrand University Press, 1995. (Editor) ISBN 9781868142521
- Terrific majesty: The powers of Shaka Zulu and the limits of invention. Harvard University Press, Cambridge, Mass., 1998. ISBN 978-0674874459
- Refiguring the archive. Springer, Dordrecht, 2002. (Joint editor) ISBN 9789401039260
- The Cambridge History of South Africa Volume 1: From early times to 1885. Cambridge University Press, Cambridge, 2009. (Editor With Bernard K. Mbenga and Robert Rossof) ISBN 978-0521517942
- Uncertain Curature: In and Out of the Archive. Jacana Media, Johannesburg, 2014. (Editor with Pippa Skotnes) ISBN 9781431406296

== See also ==
- Club of Rome
