= Botatwe languages =

Bantu language family

Botatwe
- Bantu Botatwe
- Geographic distribution: Southern, Lusaka, Central Zambia
- Linguistic classification: Niger–Congo?: Atlantic–Congo; Benue–Congo; Southern Bantoid; Bantu (Zone M.60); Botatwe

Language codes
- Glottolog: bota1239

The Botatwe languages are a group of Bantu languages. They are the languages of Guthrie group M.60 (Lenje–Tonga) plus some of the Subia languages (K.40):

- Tonga (incl. Dombe, Leya)
- Ila (Lundwe, Sala)
- Soli
- Lamba
- Lenje (incl. Lukanga Twa)
- Subia (K40): Fwe (Sifwe), Kuhane (Subiya, Mbalang'we)
- Totela (K41 and K411)

Kafue Twa may be Ila or Tonga.

Nurse (2003) suspects that the Sabi languages may be related.

== History and culture ==
=== Origins ===
Proto-Botatwe, the language ancestral to all modern Botatwe languages, separated from its ancestral language around 1000 BCE near modern Haut-Katanga Province, DRC, and Copperbelt/Luapula Provinces, Zambia. It originated as a branching from the Bantu-source language, diverging once the migration had reached the western bank of Lake Tanganyika.Its populations settled along the slopes of the Mitumba Mountains, slowly moving south and adopting new subsistence practices as their environment demanded, eventually diverging from their parent language upon reaching the region encompassing the headwaters of the Kafue, Lualaba, and Luapula rivers.Proto-Botatwe managed to maintain a relatively high degree of linguistic and, thus arguably, demographic stability over the course of the roughly 1500 years that it was spoken. The group rarely moved into uninhabited areas, generally choosing to integrate into and form kinship bonds with existing populations; nonetheless, it maintained an impressive degree of linguistic dominance throughout.

Archaeological evidence indicates the Proto-Botatwe initially practiced a hunter-gatherer lifestyle, making use of home-bases and seasonal production sites. Sites in northeastern and southern Zambia point to a lithic industry and small kinship formations. Late-Stone Age discoveries point to interactions with or origins in sedentary agricultural and semi-sedentary pastoral communities, given they would either have had to have independent knowledge of food production practices or have traded with food-producing populations for certain resources.
