= Hazel Carter (linguist) =

British-American linguist

Joan Hazel Carter (22 February 1928 – 3 August 2016) was a British-American linguist, known in particular for her work on the Bantu languages, Shona, Kongo and Tonga.

Born on 22 February 1928 to Charles and Constance Wilkinson, Carter graduated from the County Grammar School for Girls in Beckenham, Kent, England in 1947 and received a full scholarship to attend Oxford University, Oxford, England where she was a member of St. Hugh's College from 1947 to 1950.

Carter conducted fieldwork on Shona in 1952 (in present-day Zimbabwe) and on Tonga from 1957 to 1960 (in present-day Zambia). A post-graduate scholar at the School of Oriental and African Studies (SOAS) at the University of London, she became a lecturer in Bantu Languages at SOAS in 1954. In 1971 she received her doctorate with a dissertation entitled "Syntactic Tone Phrases in Kongo", which was published in 1973 under the title, "Syntax and Tone in Kikongo." She was promoted to Reader in Bantu Languages at SOAS in 1971, a post she held until 1983.

After one year as a visiting professor at the Department of African Languages & Literature at the University of Wisconsin-Madison in 1980–1981, Carter retired from SOAS and moved permanently to the United States. At the University of Wisconsin, she was first an honorary research fellow, then a visiting professor, and finally she became full professor in 1986. She retired in June 1995 and was appointed professor emerita.

In 2001 she received the Distinguished Services Award from the African Language Teachers Association.

In addition to her many other achievements, Hazel (the name she used in the knitting world) was an accomplished Shetland Lace knitter, teacher and author. Her designs are included in several printed books, and individual patterns continue to be available online.

== Key publications ==
- Carter, Hazel. 1971 and 1972. Morphotonology of Zambian Tonga: Some Developments of Meeussen's System. African Language Studies 12: 1-30 and 14: 36–52.
- Carter, Hazel. 1973. Syntax and Tone in Kikongo. London: SOAS.
- Carter, Hazel and G. P. Kahari. 1981. Shona Language Course, Books I, II and III. Distributed by ERIC Clearinghouse.
- Carter, Hazel and João Makoondekwa. c. 1987. Kongo language course : a course in the dialect of Zoombo, northern Angola = Maloòngi makíkoongo. Madison, WI : African Studies Program, University of Wisconsin—Madison.
- Carter, Hazel. 2002. An outline of Chitonga grammar. Lusaka: Zambia: Bookworld Publishers, 2002.
