= The Cambridge History of South Africa =

Two volume history of South Africa published in 2009 and 2011

Volume 1 of The Cambridge History of South Africa.

The Cambridge History of South Africa is a two volume history of South Africa published by Cambridge University Press in 2009 (Vol. 1) and 2011 (Vol. 2).

== Volumes ==
- Volume 1: From Early Times to 1885. 2009. Edited by Carolyn Hamilton, Bernard K. Mbenga, and Robert Ross. ISBN 9780521517942
- Volume 2: 1885–1994. 2011. Edited by Robert Ross, Anne Kelk Mager, and Bill Nasson. ISBN 9780521869836

== See also ==
- The Oxford History of South Africa
