= Ila language =

Bantu language spoken in Zambia

Ila
- chiIla
- Native to: Zambia
- Ethnicity: Ila
- Native speakers: 106,000 (2010 census)
- Language family: Niger–Congo?: Atlantic–Congo; Benue–Congo; Bantoid; Bantu; Botatwe; Ila
- Dialects: Ila; Lundwe; Sala; Kafue Twa?

Language codes
- ISO 639-3: Either: ilb – Ila shq – Sala
- Glottolog: ilaa1246 Ila sala1266 Sala
- Guthrie code: M.63,631–633

Ila (Chiila) is a language of Zambia. Maho (2009) lists Lundwe (Shukulumbwe) and Sala as distinct languages most closely related to Ila. Ila is one of the languages of the Earth included on the Voyager Golden Record.

== Phonology ==
The following phonology data follows a 1927 report by Clement Martyn Doke.

=== Vowels ===
Ila / Kafwe Twa / Lundwe vowels
	Front	Back
Near-close	i	u
Mid	e	o
Open	a	

Vowels may be nasalized before voiceless fricatives, and length is freely variable. There are no diphthongs.

In Ila proper, /a/ is between front and central positions [a̠], noticeably further forward than in Kafwe Twa and Lundwe, where it is more standard central [ä]. All other vowels are phonetically lower (more open) than their cardinal values: [i̞, u̞, e̞, o̞]. Before laterals /l, ɺ/, mid /e/ lowers even further to approach an open-mid quality [ɛ].

=== Consonants ===
Letters shown in ⟨angle brackets⟩ are Doke's orthography where it differs from typical IPA transcriptions.

Ila / Kafwe Twa / Lundwe consonants
		Bilabial	Alveolar	(Alveolo-) Palatal	Velar	Glottal	
		Bilabial	Alveolar	(Alveolo-) Palatal	Velar	lab.	pal.
Nasal		m	n	ɲ	ŋ	(ɦ̃ʷ) ⟨ɦ̰⟩	(ʑ̤̃) ⟨ɲ⟩ (Note: The nasal allophone [ʑ̤̃] is typically only used in Kafwe Twa and Lundwe, though it is adopted by some Ila proper speakers.)
Plosive	voiceless	pʰ	tʰ	c (Note: Of the voiceless plosives, ⫽p⫽ and ⫽t⫽ are aspirated in all three dialects, while ⫽c⫽ and ⫽k⫽ differ in each. In Ila proper, ⫽c⫽ is aspirated /cʰ/ and ⫽k⫽ is tenuis /k/; in Kafwe Twa, both are tenuis /c, k/; in Lundwe, ⫽c⫽ is tenuis /c/ and ⫽k⫽ is aspirated /kʰ/.)	k		
Plosive	voiced	b	d	ɟ	ɡ		
Fricative	voiceless		s	ɕ ⟨ʃ⟩		hʷ ⟨h⟩	
Fricative	voiced	β ⟨ʋ⟩	z	ʑ ⟨ʒ⟩ (Note: For the voiced fricative ⫽ʒ⫽, Ila proper speakers use /ʑ/, while Kafwe Twa and Lundwe speakers replace it with /ʑ̤/.)		ɦʷ ⟨ɦ⟩	ʑ̤ ⟨⟩
Approximant			l	j	w		
Flap			ɺ ⟨𝼑⟩				

==== Uncommon fricatives ====
The set that Doke wrote as ⟨h, ɦ, ɦ̰⟩ are described as "labio-glottal" fricatives. ⟨h⟩ is voiceless, ⟨ɦ⟩ is voiced, and ⟨ɦ̰⟩ is a nasalized form of ⟨ɦ⟩. Doke noted that the voiceless fricative had previously been written as ⟨f⟩ or ⟨h⟩, and the voiced fricative as ⟨vh⟩. He described them as "modified glottal fricatives" with concurrent lip friction and the tongue kept in a velar position, thus giving them a [w]-like glide. He also provided an alternate description of them as velarized variants of typical glottal fricatives with lip friction similar to that of a bilabial fricative [β]. They might thus be transcribed as [hʷ, ɦʷ, ɦ̃ʷ], or more precisely as [hˠᶲ, ɦˠᵝ, ɦ̃ˠᵝ].

Lundwe and Kafwe Twa are described as having a "palato-glottal" fricative in place of /ʑ/, which he wrote as ⟨⟩, a combination of ⟨ɦ⟩ and ⟨ʒ⟩. It has a nasalized form in nasal environments. The tongue position is approximately the same as [ʑ] but with strong glottal friction. The variants might thus be transcribed as [ʑ̤, ʑ̤̃] (with the diacritic for breathy voice).

=== Tonality and stress ===
Doke noted that there are high, mid, and low tones, which he transcribed as ⟨◌̍⟩ for high, unmarked for mid, and ⟨◌̩⟩ for low. There are many instances in which tone is used to distinguish terms. For example, ⟨cita̩⟩ [cʰi̞tà̠] 'do' versus ⟨cita̍⟩ [cʰi̞tá̠] 'I don't know', ⟨ʋala̩⟩ [βa̠là̠] 'carry' versus ⟨ʋala̍⟩ [βa̠lá̠] 'read'.

== Orthography ==
According to Smith & Dale (1919):

- ch in fact varies from "k" to a "weak" version of English "ch", to a "strong" "ch" to "ty".
- j as the voiced sound corresponding to this therefore varies "g"/English "j"/ "dy" / and "y".
- v is reportedly a voiced labiodental fricative /v/ as in English ⟨v⟩, and vh the same labialised and aspirated /vʷʰ/ ("lips more rounded with a more distinct emission of breath").
- zh is the voiced post-alveolar fricative /ʒ/; French ⟨j⟩ as in bonjour.
- ng is the voiced velar nasal followed by a voiced velar plosive, /ŋg/ as in RP English "finger", while ng' is a plain voiced velar nasal /ŋ/ as in "singer" - a similar distinction is observed in Swahili.

Doke provides the following recommended orthography:

Letter	a	b	c	d	e	g	h	ɦ	i	k	l	m	n	ɲ	ŋ	o	p	s	ʃ	t	u	w	y	z	ʒ
IPA	ä	b, β	c(ʰ)	d	e̞	ɡ	hʷ	ɦʷ, ɦ̃ʷ	i̞	k(ʰ)	l, ɺ	m	n	ɲ	ŋ	o̞	pʰ	s	ɕ	tʰ	u̞	w	j	z	ʑ

== Example terms ==
- imboni - pupil of the eye
- ipeezhyo - brush; broom
- indimi - tongues
- lemeka - honour (verb)
- bamba - arrange
- Bamambila - they arrange for me
- Balanumba - they praise me
- bobu buzani - this meat
- Bobu mbuzani - this is meat
- chita - to do, same is used to mean 'I have no idea'
- chisha - to cause to do
- katala - to be tired
- katazhya - to make tired
- ukatazhya-refuse to be sent;scarce
- dakuzanda-I love you
- twalumba-Thank you
- impongo - a goat

=== Ideophones or imitation words ===
Words in English such as "Splash!", "Gurgle", "Ker-putt" express ideas without the use of sentences. Smith and Dale point out that this kind of expression is very common in the Ila language:

You may say Ndamuchina anshi ("I throw him down"), but it is much easier and more trenchant to say simply Ti!, and it means the same.

Some examples:

- Muntu wawa - A person falls
- Wawa mba - falls headlong
- Mba! - He falls headlong
- Mbo! mbo! mbo! mbò! - (with lowered intonation on the last syllable) He falls gradually
- Mbwa! - flopping down, as in a chair
- Wa! wa! wa! wa!- The rain is pattering
- Pididi! pididi! pididi! - of a tortoise, falling over and over from a great height
- Ndamuchina anshi - I throw him down
- Ti! - ditto
- Te! - torn, ripped
- Amana te! - The matter's finished
- To-o! - So peaceful!
- Wi! - All is calm
- Ne-e! - All is calm
- Tuh! - a gun going off
- Pi! - Phew, it's hot!
- Lu! - Yuck, it's bitter!
- Lu-u! - Erh, it's sour!
- Lwe! - Yum, sweet!
- Mbi! - It's dark
- Mbi! mbi! mbi! mbi! - It's utterly dark
- Sekwè sekwè! - the flying of a goose
- nachisekwe - a goose

== Grammar ==
=== Class prefixes ===
As in many other languages, Ila uses a system of noun classes. Either the system as presented by Smith and Dale is simpler than that for Nyanja, ChiChewa, Tonga, or Bemba, or the authors have skated over the complexities by the use of the category "significant letter":

- Class 1. singular: prefix: mu-; s/l. (= "significant letter" verb, adjective, etc. prefix appropriate to the class:) u-, w-
- Class 1. plural. prefix: ba-; s/l. b-
- Class 2. sing. prefix: mu-; s/l. u-, w-
- Class 2. pl. prefix: mi-; s/l. i-, y-
- Class 3. sing. prefix: i-, di-; s/l. l-, d-
- Class 3. pl. prefix: ma-; s/l. a-
- Class 4. sing. prefix: bu- abstract nouns; s/l. b-
- Class 4. pl. prefix: ma-; s/l. a-
- Class 5. sing. prefix: ku- often nouns of place; s/l. k-
- Class 5. pl. prefix: ma-; s/l. a-
- Class 6. sing. prefix: ka- a diminutive sense; s/l. k-
- Class 6. pl. prefix: tu- diminutive plural; s/l. t-
- Class 7. sing. prefix: chi- "thing" class; s/l. ch-
- Class 7. pl. prefix: shi-; s/l. sh-
- Class 8. sing. prefix: in-; s/l. i-, y-
- Class 8. pl. prefix: in-; s/l. y-, sh-
- Class 9. sing. prefix: lu-; s/l. l-
- Class 9. pl. prefix: in-; s/l. y-, sh-
- Class 10. sing. prefix: lu-; s/l. l-
- Class 10. pl. prefix: ma-; s/l. a-

The locatives form a special category:

- mu- - at rest in, motion into, motion out from;
- ku- - position at, to, from
- a- - rest upon, to or from off (Compare pa- prefix in Sanga, etc.)

Thus:

- Mung'anda mulashia - The inside of the house is dark.
- Kung'anda kulashia - Around the house it is dark.
- Ang'anda alashia - Darkness is upon the house.

=== The Ila verb system ===
The root is the part of the verb giving the primary meaning. To this can be added prefixes and suffixes: many elements can be united in this way, sometimes producing long and complex polysyllabic verb words. For example, from the root anga, "to tie", we can derive such a form as Tamuna kubaangulwila anzhyi? meaning, "Why have you still not untied them?"

Prefixes can show:

- tense
- subject
- object
- voice (exceptional)

Suffixes can show:

- voice
- tense (exceptional)
- mood

Here are some of the forms of the verb kubona, "to see". (Note that there are also negative forms, e.g. ta-tu-boni, "we do not see", that there is also a subjunctive mood, a conditional mood, a jussive mood and the imperative. Many subjunctive forms end in -e.

The root of the verb is in two forms:

- (i) simple stem: bona : code - SS
- (ii) modified stem: bwene : code ₴
- -SS tubona we (who) see
- -₵ tubwene we (who) have seen
- -A-SS twabona we saw, see, have seen
- -A-CHI-SS twachibona we continue seeing
- -A-YA-BU-SS twayabubona we are engaged in seeing
- -DI-MU-KU-SS tudmukubona we are seeing
- -CHI-SS tuchibona we continue to see
- -LA-SS tulabona we are constantly (usually, certainly) seeing
- -LA-YA-BU-SS tulayabubona we are being engaged in seeing
- -LA-YA-KU-SS tulayakubona we are habitually in the act of seeing
- -DI-₵ tulibwene we have seen
- -CHI-₵ tuchibwene we have been seeing
- -A-KA-SS twakabona we saw
- -A-KA-CHI-SS twakachibona we continued seeing
- -A-KA-YA-BU-SS twakayabubona we were engaged in seeing
- KA-SS katubona (Notice the position of tu here) we saw
- KA-₵ katubwene we did see
- -A-KU-SS twakubona we were seeing
- -A-KU-CHI-SS twakuchibona we were continuing to see
- -A-KU-YA-BU-SS twakuyabubona we were engaged in seeing
- -A-KU-₵ twakubwene we had seen
- -KA-LA-SS tukalabona we shall soon see
- -KA-LA-CHI-SS tukalachibona we shall continue seeing
- -KA-LA-YA-BU-SS tukalayabubona we shall be engaged in seeing

The above English renderings are approximate.

Certain suffixes add new dimensions of meaning to the root. Although these follow some logic, we again have to feel a way towards an adequate translation into English or any other language:

- simple verb: bona - to see
- relative or dative form: -ila, -ela, -ina, -ena: bonena - to see to, for somebody, and so on
- extended relative: ilila, -elela, -inina, enena: bonenena - to see to, for somebody, etc. ililila - to go right away
- causative: -ya + many sound changes: chisha - to cause to do, from chita - to do
- capable, "-able": -ika, -eka: chitika - to be do-able
- passive: -wa: chitwa - to be done
- middle (a kind of reflexive that acts upon oneself - compare Greek): -uka: anduka - to be in a split position, from andulwa- to be split by somebody
- stative; in fixed constructions only: -ama: lulama - to be straight; kotama - to be bowed
- extensive: -ula: sandula - turn over; andula - split up
- extensive, with the sense of "keep on doing": -aula: andaula - chop up firewood
- equivalent of English prefix "re-": -ulula: ululula - to trade something over and over again, from ula - to trade
- or the equivalent of the English prefix "un-", also: -ulula: ambulula - to unsay, to retract
- reflexive - a prefix this time - di- : dianga - to tie oneself, from anga - to tie; dipa - to give to each other, from pa - to give
- reciprocal: -ana: bonana - to see each other
- intensive: -isha: angisha - to tie tightly
- reduplicative: ambukambuka - keep on turning aside, from ambuka - to turn aside

These can be used in composites: e.g. langilizhya - to cause to look on behalf of.

== Oral literature ==
In 1920, Edwin W. Smith and Andrew Murray Dale published The Ila-speaking Peoples of Northern Rhodesia in two volumes; the second volume features a large number of Ila texts with English translations. The texts come from Ila people living along the Kafue River in what was then Northern Rhodesia. There are 60 folktales, including a long cycle of stories about the trickster hare, along with proverbs, riddles, and dilemma tales. Here are some of the proverbs:

- "Kwina mwami owakadizhala." "No chief ever gave birth to a chief (the hereditary principle by which a son follows his father is unknown to the Ba-ila)."
- "Chizhilo chibe chishinka museuna." "Any old pole will stop up a hole in the fence (i.e. everybody is useful to the community in some way or other)."
- "Mano takala mutwi omwi." "Wisdom does not dwell in one head."
- "Mukando mushie lubilo, mano tomushii." "You may outrun an old man, but you can't outdo him in wisdom."
- "Kabwenga moa ng'uongola." "It is the prudent hyena that lives long."

Here are some of the riddles:

- "Ukwa Lesa ndachileta chitasakululwa. Matwi." "I brought a thing from God that cannot be taken off like clothes. Ears."
- "Muzovu umina ch'amba mwifu. Ing'anda." "An elephant that swallows something which speaks in its stomach. A house."
- "Kakalo katazuminini. Ndinango dia umbwa." "A little spring that never dries up. A dog's nose."
- "Ku kuya ndachiyana, ku kuzhoka shichiyene. Mume." "Going I found it; returning I found it not. The dew."
- "Ndawala mwitala. Menso." "Something I threw over to the other side of the river. Eyes."

The Ila stories of the trickster hare have many affinities with the Br'er Rabbit stories collected by Joel Chandler Harris from African American storytellers in Georgia in the 19th century. Some of the enslaved people of the southern United States were captured and purchased in this area of Zambia. In addition, African American storytellers, including those consulted by Harris, made use of ideophones in English that resemble the ideophones of African languages such as Ila.

== Bibliography ==
Smith, Edwin William & Dale, Andrew Murray, The Ila-speaking Peoples of Northern Rhodesia. Macmillan and Company, London, 1920.
