= Town Bemba =

Bemba variety of Zambia

- Native to: Zambia
- Region: Copperbelt
- Native speakers: unknown, but growing; 2–3 million as L2 (2009)
- Language family: Bemba-based

Language codes
- ISO 639-3: None (mis)
- Glottolog: town1238
- Guthrie code: M.40A

Town Bemba is an innovative variety of the Bemba language spoken among migrant populations in central Zambia. It developed in the mines and mining towns, where it replaced the earlier, and foreign, Fanagalo.

It has been described as a creole, but this is dubious, since Town Bemba never went through a pidgin phase and its phonology and grammar differ only slightly from standard Bemba. Unlike in Nyanja, whose urban form needs to be treated as a separate language for literary purposes, literacy materials in Bemba such as those produced by iSchool.zm can generally be used by both urban and traditional speakers.
