= Seba language =

Bantu language of DR Congo

Seba
- Native to: Democratic Republic of the Congo
- Region: Copperbelt
- Native speakers: 170,000 (2002)
- Language family: Niger–Congo?: Atlantic–Congo; Benue–Congo; Bantoid; Bantu; Sabi; South; Seba

Language codes
- ISO 639-3: kdg
- Glottolog: seba1247
- Guthrie code: M.55

Seba (Sewa) is a Bantu language of DR Congo.
