= Aushi language =

Bantu language

Aushi
- Ikyaushi
- Native to: Zambia, Democratic Republic of the Congo
- Region: Luapula Province, (Haut-)Katanga Province
- Native speakers: 100,000 in Zambia (2010 census) widespread as L2 in DR Congo
- Language family: Niger–Congo?: Atlantic–Congo; Volta-Congo; Benue–Congo; Bantoid; Southern Bantoid; Bantu; Sabi; South; Aushi
- Writing system: Latin

Official status
- Recognised minority language in: Zambia; DR Congo

Language codes
- ISO 639-3: auh
- Glottolog: aush1241
- Guthrie code: M.402

Aushi, known by native speakers as Ikyaushi, is a Bantu language primarily spoken in the Lwapula Province of Zambia and the (Haut-)Katanga Province of the Democratic Republic of Congo. Although many scholars argue that it is a dialect of the closely related Bemba, native speakers insist that it is a distinct language. Nonetheless, speakers of both linguistic varieties enjoy extensive mutual intelligibility, particularly in the Lwapula Province.

== Phonology ==
Aushi distinguishes consonants according to five manners and four places of articulation. Although nasal consonants are individually phonemic, prenasalized consonants also arise in conjunction with the voiced and voiceless counterparts of the plosives, affricates, and fricatives.

Consonants
			Labial	Alveolar	Palatal	Velar
Nasal			m	n	ɲ	ŋ
Plosive/ Affricate	plain		p	t	t͡ʃ	k
Plosive/ Affricate	prenasal	voiceless	ᵐp	ⁿt	ⁿt͡ʃ	ᵑk
Plosive/ Affricate	prenasal	voiced	ᵐb	ⁿd	ⁿd͡ʒ	ᵑɡ
Fricative	plain	voiceless	f	s		
Fricative	plain	voiced	β			
Fricative	prenasal		ᶬf	ⁿs		
Lateral				l		
Approximant					j	w

Aushi has five canonical vowels that are distinguished segmentally according to vowel height and backness and suprasegmentally according to length (short/long) and tone (low/high). The front and central vowels are unrounded, while the back vowels are rounded. In environments where vowels arise before a nasal consonant, the vowels may adopt nasality, but this is not a distinctive feature, i.e. it is phonetic, not phonemic.

Vowels
	Front		Central		Back	
	short	long	short	long	short	long
High	i	iː			u	uː
Mid	e	eː			o	oː
Low			a	aː		

== Grammar ==
Nominal Classes
Class	Proto-Bantu	Augment	Prefix	Example	Gloss
1a	*mo-	u-	mu-	umuntu	"person"
1b	*∅-	∅-	∅-	mayo	"mother"
2	*βɔ-, *βa-	a-	ba-	abantu	"people"
3	*mo-	u-	mu-	umuti	"tree"
4	*me-	i-	mi-	imiti	"trees"
5a	*le-	i-	shi-	ishina	"name"
5b	*le-	i-	∅-	isabi	"fish"
6	*ma-	a-	ma-	amana	"names"
7	*ke-	i-	ki-	ikitabu	"book"
8	*βi-, *li-	i-	fi-	ifitabu	"books"
9	*ne-	i-	N-	imfinsi	"darkness/night"
10	*li-ne	i-	N-	insiku	"days"
11	*lʊ-	u-	lu-	ulutambi	"proverb"
12	*ka-	a-	ka-	akalulu	"rabbit"
13	*to-	u-	tu-	utunwa	"mouths"
14	*βo-	u-	bu-	ubwaato	"canoe"
15a	*ko-	u-	ku-	ukuya	"to go"
15b	*ko-	u-	ku-	ukuboko	"arm"
16	*pa-	∅-	pa-	pa ng'anda	"in (the/a) house"
17	*ko-	∅-	ku-	ku mushi	"to (the/a) market"
18	*mo-	∅-	mu-	mu sukulu	"in/inside (the/a) school"
