= The Oxford History of South Africa =

The Oxford History of South Africa. Vol. I

The Oxford History of South Africa is a two volume history of South Africa published by Clarendon Press in 1969 (Vol. I) and 1971 (Vol. II). The publication of the work marked a watershed in the historiography of South Africa by for the first time giving indigenous Africans a central role in the history of the country.

== Background ==
Until the 1960s, the history of South Africa was predominantly seen through a white colonialist lens that concentrated on white political history since the beginning of European settlement and tended to ignore earlier events and the history of the black majority. It was also a history written predominantly by whites and taught in white-dominated universities. This began to change in the 1970s as South African historians were exposed to new ways of working in foreign universities, particularly in Shula Marks's London history seminar.

== Publication ==
The publication of the two volumes has been described as a watershed in South African historiography as the first work to devote a significant amount of space to the indigenous African population and, in the first volume, as much space to blacks as whites. The fact that it broke new ground made it controversial but it helped to foster new research in the area.

== Volumes ==
- The Oxford History of South Africa Volume I. South Africa to 1870. Clarendon Press, Oxford, 1969.
- The Oxford History of South Africa Volume II. South Africa 1870 to 1966. Clarendon Press, Oxford, 1971.

== See also ==
- The Cambridge History of South Africa
