= Taabwa language =

Bantu language of Congo and Zambia

Taabwa
- Ichitaabwa
- Native to: Zambia, Democratic Republic of Congo
- Native speakers: (250,000 in DRC cited 1982); 32,000 in Zambia (2010 census)
- Language family: Niger–Congo?: Atlantic–Congo; Benue–Congo; Bantoid; Bantu; Sabi; Taabwa

Language codes
- ISO 639-3: tap
- Glottolog: taab1238
- Guthrie code: M.41

Taabwa (Ichitaabwa; also called "Kitabwa" and spelled "Tabwa"), or Rungu (Malungu), is a Bantu language of Congo and Zambia spoken by half a million or so people.

== See also ==
- Taabwa Twa
