= Clement Martyn Doke =

South African linguist

- Born: 16 May 1893; Bristol, England
- Died: 24 February 1980 (aged 86); East London, South Africa
- Education: Transvaal University College
- Scientific career
- Fields: Linguistics
- Workplaces: University of the Witwatersrand

Clement Martyn Doke (16 May 1893 in Bristol, United Kingdom – 24 February 1980 in East London, South Africa) was a South African linguist working mainly on African languages. Realizing that the grammatical structures of Bantu languages are quite different from those of European languages, he was one of the first African linguists of his time to abandon the Euro-centric approach to language description for a more locally grounded one. A most prolific writer, he published a string of grammars, several dictionaries, comparative work, and a history of Bantu linguistics.

== Early life and career ==
The Doke family had been engaged in missionary activity for the Baptist Church for some generations. His father, Reverend Joseph J. Doke, left England and travelled to South Africa in 1882, where he met and married Agnes Biggs. They returned to England, where Clement was born as the third of four children. The family moved to New Zealand and eventually returned to South Africa in 1903, where it later settled in Johannesburg.

At the age of 18, Clement received a bachelor's degree from Transvaal University College in Pretoria (now the University of Pretoria). He decided to devote his life to missionary activity. In 1913, he accompanied his father on a tour of north-western Rhodesia, to an area called Lambaland, now known as Ilamba. It is at the watershed of the Congo and Zambesi rivers. Part of the district lay in Northern Rhodesia and part of the Belgian Congo. The Cape-Cairo Railway threaded through its eastern portion; otherwise, most travel had to be on foot.

The Reverend William Arthur Phillips of the Nyasa Industrial Mission in Blantyre had established a Baptist mission there in 1905; it served an area of 25,000 square miles (65,000 km^{2}) and 50,000 souls. The Dokes were supposed to investigate whether the mission in Lambaland could be taken over by the Baptist Union of South Africa. It was on that trip that Doke's father contracted enteric fever and died soon afterwards. Mahatma Gandhi attended the memorial service and addressed the congregation. Clement assumed his father's role.

The South African Baptists decided to take over Kafulafuta Mission, and its founder, Reverend Phillips, remained as superintendent. Clement Doke returned to Kafulafuta as missionary in 1914, followed by his sister Olive two years later.

== Study of Lamba ==
At first, Clement Doke was frustrated by his inability to communicate with the Lamba. The only written material available at the time was a translation of Jonah and a collection of 47 hymns. Soon, however, he mastered the language and published his first book, Ifintu Fyakwe Lesa ("The Things of God, a Primer of Scripture Knowledge") in 1917. He enrolled in Johannesburg as the extension of Transvaal University College for an MA degree. His thesis was published as The Grammar of the Lamba language. The book is couched in traditional grammatical terms, as Doke had not yet established his innovative method to analyse and describe the Bantu languages. His later Textbook of Lamba Grammar is far superior in that respect.

Doke was also interested in ethnology. In 1931 he compiled The Lambas of Northern Rhodesia, which remains one of the outstanding ethnographic descriptions of the peoples of Central Africa. For Doke, literacy was part of evangelisation since it was required so that people to appreciate the Bible's message, but it was only after his retirement that he completed the translation of the Bible into Lamba. It was published under the title of Amasiwi AwaLesa ("The Words of God") in 1959.

== University of the Witwatersrand ==
In 1919, Doke married Hilda Lehmann, who accompanied him back to Lambaland. Both contracted malaria during their work, and she was forbidden to return to Lambaland. Clement Doke also realised that his field work could not continue much longer, and he left in 1921. He was recruited by the newly founded University of the Witwatersrand. So that he could secure a qualification as a lecturer, the family moved to England, where he registered at the School of Oriental and African Studies. His major languages were Lamba and Luba, but as no suitable examiner was available, he eventually had to change his language to Zulu.

Doke took up his appointment in the new Department of Bantu Studies at the University of Witwatersrand in 1923. In 1925 he received his D.Litt. for his doctoral thesis The Phonetics of the Zulu Language and was promoted to Senior Lecturer. In 1931 he was appointed to the Chair of Bantu Studies and thus headed the Department of Bantu Studies. The department acted as a catalyst for the admission of Africans to the university. As early as 1925 a limited number were admitted to the vacation course in African Studies. Doke supported the appointment of Benedict Wallet Vilakazi as member of the staff, as he believed a native speaker was essential for acquiring a language. That provoked a storm of criticism and controversy from the public. Both of them collaborated on the Zulu-English Dictionary. First published in 1948, it is still one of the best examples of lexicography for any Bantu language.

At the request of the government of Southern Rhodesia, Doke investigated the range of dialect diversity among the languages of the country and made recommendations for Unified Shona, which formed the basis for Standard Shona. He devised a unified orthography based on the Zezuru, Karanga and Manyika dialects. However, Doke's orthography was never fully accepted, and the South African government introduced an alternative, which left Shona with two competing orthographies between 1935 and 1955.

During his tenure, Doke developed and promoted a method of linguistic analysis and description of the Bantu languages that was based upon the structure of these languages. The "Dokean model" continues to be one of the dominant models of linguistic description in Southern and Central Africa. His classification of the Bantu languages was for many years the dominant view of the interrelations among the African languages. He was also an early describer of Khoisan and Bantu click consonants, devising phonetic symbols for a number of them.

Beginning in 1935 and together with D. T. Cole (Desmond Thorne Cole) he edited The Bantu Treasury book series published by the Witwatersrand University Press (later reissued as the African Treasury Series).

Doke served the University of the Witwatersrand until his retirement in 1953. He was awarded the honorary degree of Doctor of Letters by Rhodes University and the honorary degree of Doctor of Laws by the University of the Witwatersrand in 1972.

The former missionary always remained devoted to the Baptist Church. He was elected President of the South African Baptist Union in 1949 and spent a year visiting churches and mission stations. He used his presidential address in condemning the recently established apartheid policy: I solemnly warn the Government that the spirit behind their apartheid legislation, and the way in which they are introducing discriminatory measures of all types today, will bring disaster upon this fair land of ours.

== Selected publications ==
- Ifintu Fyakwe Lesa (The Things of God, a Primer of Scripture Knowledge in Lamba), 1917.
- An outline of the phonetics of the language of the ʗhũ̬꞉ Bushman of the North-West Kalahari. Bantu Studies. 2: 129–166, 1925. doi:10.1080/02561751.1923.9676181
- The phonetics of the Zulu language. University of the Witwatersrand Press, 1969 [1926].
- The Lambas of Northern Rhodesia: A Study of their Customs and Beliefs. London: George G. Harrap, 1931.
- Report on the Unification of the Shona Dialects. Government of Southern Rhodesia: Government Blue Book, 1931.
- Bantu linguistic terminology. London; New York Longmans, Green, 1935.
- Textbook of Lamba Grammar. Johannesburg: Witwatersrand University Press, 1938.
- Outline grammar of Bantu. Johannesburg: University of the Witwatersrand, 1943.
- Zulu–English Dictionary. Johannesburg: Witwatersrand University Press, 1948. (with Benedict Wallet Vilakazi)
- The Southern Bantu languages. London; New York: Oxford University Press, 1954.
- Amasiwi AwaLesa (The Words of God in Lamba), 1959.
- Contributions to the history of Bantu linguistics. Johannesburg: Witwatersrand University Press, 1961 (with D. T. Cole).
- Trekking in South Central Africa 1913–1919. Johannesburg: Witwatersrand University Press, 1993.
