= Luvale language =

Bantu language of Angola and Zambia

Luvale
- Chiluvale
- Native to: Angola, Zambia
- Ethnicity: Lovale
- Native speakers: (640,000 cited 2001–2010)
- Language family: Niger–Congo?: Atlantic–Congo; Volta-Congo; Benue–Congo; Bantoid; Southern Bantoid; Bantu (Zone K); Chokwe–Luchazi (K.10); Luvale
- Writing system: Latin (Luvale alphabet); Luvale Braille

Official status
- Recognised minority language in: Zambia

Language codes
- ISO 639-3: lue
- Glottolog: luva1239
- Guthrie code: K.14

Luvale (also spelt Chiluvale, Lovale, Lubale, Luena, Lwena) is a Bantu language spoken by the Lovale people of Angola and Zambia.

It is the native language of 180 thousand people in Angola (as of 2024), mostly in the Moxico Leste Province, where a third of the population speaks it as a native language. It is recognized as a regional language for educational and administrative purposes in Zambia, where about 168,000 people speak it (as of 2006). Luvale uses a modified form of the Latin alphabet in its written form.

Luvale is closely related to Chokwe.

== Vocabulary ==
It contains many loanwords from Portuguese from colonial contact during 20th century, such as:

Luvale	Portuguese	English
xikata	escada	ladder
xikitelu	mosquitero	mosquito net
ngatwe	gato	cat
mbalili	barril	powder keg (lit. barrel)
kaluwaxa	carro	bicycle
semana	semana	week

Most verbs begin with "ku" in the infinitive form. In a modern dictionary, verbs are listed without the "ku" prefix, unlike in older dictionaries.

Verb	Without Prefix	English infinitive
kutonga	tonga	to sew
kwimba	imba	to sing
kwehuka	ehuka	to step aside

== Phonology ==
=== Consonants ===
Consonants of Luvale
		Labial	Alveolar	Palatal	Velar	Glottal
Nasal		m	n	ɲ	ŋ	
Plosive/ Affricate	voiceless	p	t	tʃ	k	
Plosive/ Affricate	prenasal	ᵐb	ⁿd	ᶮdʒ	ᵑɡ	
Fricative	voiceless	f	s	ʃ		h
Fricative	voiced	v	z	ʒ		
Approximant		w	l	j		

Consonants may also occur as labialized [ʷ] or palatalized [ʲ].

=== Vowels ===
Vowels of Luvale
	Front	Central	Back
Close	i iː		u uː
Close-mid	e eː		o oː
Open-mid	ɛ ɛː		ɔ ɔː
Open		a aː	

== Speakers ==
- Bernard K. Mbenga
- Samba Yonga
- Mokoomba
