= Bwile language =

Language

Bwile
- Native to: Zambia, DR Congo
- Ethnicity: Bwile people
- Native speakers: 32,000 (2002–2010)
- Language family: Niger–Congo?: Atlantic–Congo; Benue–Congo; Southern Bantoid; Bantu (Zone M); Sabi?; Bwile

Language codes
- ISO 639-3: bwc
- Glottolog: bwil1245
- Guthrie code: M.401

Bwile is a Bantu language of Zambia and DR Congo of Sabi group.
