= Dilemma story =

African story-form

A dilemma story (also dilemma tale) is an African story-form intended to provoke discussion. They are used as a form of both entertainment and instruction. Unlike many other story forms, which culminate in a firm conclusion, dilemma stories are open ended, and meant to spark conversation and debate. According to Alta Jablow, "certain of the stories serve as devices for teaching ethics and attitudes in personal relationships. How should friends act toward each other? What is the greatest act of filial piety? What constitutes cleverness? Though the questions may not always be explicit in the tale, the discussions leading up to a solution will point up such basic values as these."

William R. Bascom provided several examples of dilemma stories in his 1975 book, African Dilemma Tales, including this story, "the Missing Eye," from the Bura people:

There were four blind people: a man, his mother, his wife, and his mother-in-law. On a journey the man found seven eyes. He gave his wife two eyes and took two for himself. He gave one eye to his mother and one to his wife's mother. "He had one eye left in his hand. 'Kai,' a stalling thing had happened. Here was his mother with her one eye looking at him. There was his wife's mother with her one eye looking at him. To whom should he give the one eye he had left? If he gives it to his mother, he will be ashamed before his wife's mother, and before his wife, because both of them are looking at him. If he gives it to his wife's mother, he fears the heart of his mother, because a mother is not something to be played with. This is very difficult indeed; what shall he do? Here is the sweetness of his wife, and the sweetness of his mother. Which would be easier? If this thing would come to you, which would you choose? Your mother or your wife's mother-- choose! This is a real problem. Dare any man choose?"
