= Proto-Bantu language =

Reconstructed language

Proto-Bantu
- Reconstruction of: Bantu languages
- Region: Sanaga and Nyong river regions of Southern Cameroon
- Era: ca. 4500–4000 BC
- Reconstructed ancestor: Proto-Niger–Congo

Proto-Bantu is the reconstructed common ancestor of the Bantu languages, a subgroup of the Southern Bantoid languages. It is thought to have originally been spoken in West/Central Africa in the area of what is now Cameroon. About 6,000 years ago, it split off from Proto-Southern Bantoid when the Bantu expansion began to the south and east. Two theories have been put forward about the way the languages expanded: one is that the Bantu-speaking people moved first to the Congo region and then a branch split off and moved to East Africa; the other (more likely) is that the two groups split from the beginning, one moving to the Congo region, and the other to East Africa.

Like other proto-languages, there is no record of Proto-Bantu. Its words and pronunciation have been reconstructed by linguists. From the common vocabulary which has been reconstructed on the basis of present-day Bantu languages, it appears that agriculture, fishing, and the use of boats were already known to the Bantu people before their expansion began, but iron-working was still unknown. This places the date of the start of the expansion somewhere between 3000 BC and 800 BC.

A minority view casts doubt on whether Proto-Bantu, as a unified language, actually existed in the time before the Bantu expansion, or whether Proto-Bantu was not a single language but a group of related dialects. One scholar, Roger Blench, writes: "[...] [t]he argument from comparative linguistics which links the highly diverse languages of zone A to a genuine reconstruction is non-existent. Most claimed [P]roto-Bantu is either confined to particular subgroups, or is widely attested outside Bantu proper." According to this hypothesis, Bantu is actually a polyphyletic group that combines a number of smaller language families which ultimately belong to the larger Southern Bantoid language family.

== Urheimat ==
The homeland of Proto-Bantu was most likely in the upland forest fringes around the Sanaga and Nyong rivers of Southern Cameroon. It was formerly thought that proto-Bantu originated somewhere in the border region between Nigeria and Cameroon. However, new research revealed that was more likely the original area of Proto-Southern Bantoid, before it spread southwards into Cameroon long before Proto-Bantu emerged.

== Phonology ==
Proto-Bantu is generally reconstructed to have a relatively small inventory of 11 consonants and 7 vowels.

=== Consonants ===
	Labial	Coronal	Palatal	Velar
Nasal	*m	*n	*ɲ	(*ŋ)
Voiceless	*p	*t	*c	*k
Voiced	*b	*d	*j	*g

The above phonemes exhibited considerable allophony, and the exact realisation of many of them is unclear.

- Voiceless consonants *p, *t, *k were almost certainly articulated as simple plosives [p], [t], [k].
- Voiced consonants *b and *g may also have been fricatives [β] (or [v]) and [ɣ] in some environments.
- *d was a plosive [d] before a high vowel (*i, *u) and a lateral [l] before other vowels.
- *c and *j may have been plosives [c] and [ɟ], affricates [tʃ] and [dʒ] or even sibilants [s] and [z]. [j] is also possible for *j.

Consonants could not occur at the end of a syllable, only at its beginning. Thus, the syllable structure was generally V or CV, and there were only open syllables.

Consonant clusters did not occur except prenasalised consonants, which were sequences of a nasal and a following obstruent. They could occur anywhere a single consonant was permitted, including word-initially. Prenasalised voiceless consonants were rare, as most were voiced. The nasal's articulation adapted to the articulation of the following consonant so the nasal can be considered a single unspecified nasal phoneme (indicated as *N) which had four possible allophones. Conventionally, the labial prenasal is written *m while the others are written *n.

- *mb, *mp; phonemically *Nb, *Np
- *nd, *nt; phonemically *Nd, *Nt
- *nj, *nc; phonemically *Nj, *Nc (actually pronounced as *ɲj, *ɲc)
- *ng, *nk; phonemically *Ng, *Nk (actually pronounced as *ŋg, *ŋk)

The earlier velar nasal phoneme /ŋ/, which was present in the Bantoid languages, had been lost in Proto-Bantu. It still occurred phonetically in pre-nasalised consonants but not as a phoneme.

=== Vowels ===
	Front	Back
Close	*i	*u
Near-close	*ɪ	*ʊ
Open-mid	*e	*o
Open	*a	

The representation of the vowels may differ in particular with respect to the two "middle" levels of closedness. Some prefer to denote the near-close set as *e and *o, with the more open set represented as *ɛ and *ɔ.

Syllables always ended in a vowel but could also begin with one. Vowels could also occasionally appear in a sequence but did not form diphthongs; two adjacent vowels were separate syllables. If two of the same vowel occurred together, that created a long vowel, but it was rare.

=== Tones ===
Proto-Bantu distinguished two tones, low and high. Each syllable had either a low or a high tone. A high tone is conventionally indicated with an acute accent (´), and a low tone is either indicated with a grave accent (`) or not marked at all.

== Morphology ==
=== Noun classes ===
Proto-Bantu, like its descendants, had an elaborate system of noun classes. Noun stems were prefixed with a noun prefix to specify their meaning. Other words that related or referred to that noun, such as adjectives and verbs, also received a prefix that matched the class of the noun ("agreement" or "concord").

Maho offers a broad characterization of five types of Bantu concordial systems. Languages descended from Proto-Bantu can be classified into each of the five types.

- Type A: Traditional, strictly formal
- Type B: Traditional with general animate concords
- Type C: Animacy-based SG/PL-marking
- Type D: SG/PL-marking only
- Type E: No concords at all

The following table gives a reconstruction of the system of nominal classes. Spellings have been normalised to use the ɪ and ʊ notations. Guthrie's original work uses y to describe the palatal semi-vowel, which has been normalised to use the j notation.

Number	Bleek 1869	Meinhof 1932	Meeussen 1967	Guthrie 1971	Welmers 1974	Demuth 2000	Typical meaning(s)
1	*mʊ-	*mʊ-	*mʊ-	*mo-	*mʊ-	*mʊ-	Humans, animate
2	*ba-	*ʋa-	*ba-	*ba-	*va-	*va-	Plural of class 1
3	*mʊ-	*mʊ-	*mʊ-	*mo-	*mʊ-	*mʊ-	Plants, inanimate
4	*mɪ-	*mi-	*mɪ-	*me-	*mɪ-	*mɪ-	Plural of class 3
5	*dɪ-, *lɪ-	*li-	*i-	*ji-	*lɪ-	*lɪ-	Various
6	*ma-	*ma-	*ma-	*ma-	*ma-	*ma-	Plural of class 5, liquids (mass nouns)
7	*kɪ-	*ki-	*kɪ-	*ke-	*kɪ-	*kɪ-	Various, diminutives, manner/way/language
8	*pi-	*ʋɪ-	*bi-	*bi-	*ʋi-, *li- ("8x")	*ʋi-, *di-	Plural of class 7
9	*n-	*ni-	*n-	*nj-	*nɪ-	*n-	Animals, inanimate
10	*thin-	*lɪ, ni-	*n-	*nj-	*li-nɪ-	*di-n-	Plural of class 9 and 11
11	*lʊ-	*lʊ-	*dʊ-	*do-	*lʊ-	*lʊ-	Abstract nouns
12	*ka- (13)	*ka- (13)	*ka-	*ka-	*ka-	*ka-	Diminutives
13	*tʊ- (12)	*tʊ- (12)	*tʊ-	*to-	*tʊ-	*tʊ-	Plural of class 12
14	*bʊ-	*ʋʊ-	*bʊ-	*bo-	*ʋʊ-	*ʋʊ-	Abstract nouns
15	*kʊ-	*kʊ-	*kʊ-	*ko-	*kʊ-	*kʊ-	Infinitives
16	*pa-	*pa-	*pa-	*pa-	*pa-	*pa-	Locatives (proximal, exact)
17		*kʊ-	*kʊ-	*ko-	*kʊ-	*kʊ-	Locatives (distal, approximate)
18		*mʊ-	*mʊ-	*mo-	*mʊ-	*mʊ-	Locatives (interior)
19		*pɪ-	*pi-	*pi-	*pi-	*pi-	Diminutives
20		*ɣu-					Putative
21		*ɣɪ-					Augmentative
(22)							
23			*i (24)				Locative

An alternative list of Proto-Bantu noun classes from Good (2020:151) is as follows:

Singular (number)	Singular (form)	Plural (number)	Plural (form)	Semantics
1	*mù-	2	*βà-	humans
3	*mù-	4	*mì-	trees, plants
5	*lì-	6	*mà-	mixed/cl. 6 liquids
7	*kì-	8	*βì̧-	mixed
9	*nì-	10	*lì̧-nì-	animals, mixed
11	*lù-			mixed
12	*kà-	13	*tù-	augmentative, diminutive, etc.
14	*βù-			abstract
15	*kù-			infinitive
16	*pà-			location on
17	*kù-			location at
18	*mù-			location in
19	*pì̧-			diminutive

Wilhelm Bleek's reconstruction consisted of sixteen noun prefixes. Carl Meinhof adapted Bleek's prefixes, changing some phonological features and adding more prefixes, bringing the total number to 21. A. E. Meeussen reduced Meinhof's reconstructed prefixes to 19, but added an additional locative prefix numbered 23. Malcolm Guthrie later reconstructed the same 19 classes as Meeussen, but removed locative prefix numbered 23.

Hendrikse and Poulos proposed a semantic continuum for Bantu noun classes. Numbers identifying noun classes in the table are referenced from the above table giving a reconstruction of nominal classes.

Nouns	→	Adjective-like Nouns	→	Adverb-like Nouns	→	Verb-like Nouns
1/2, 3/4, 9/10	5/6, 7/8, 11	12/13, 19, 20, 21, 22		16, 17, 18, 23	14	15
Concreteness (five senses)		Attribution (two senses)		Spatial orientation (one sense)		Abstractness (no sense)

This arrangement permits the classification of noun classes via nonlinguistic factors like perception and cognition. Hendrikse and Poulos have grouped singular and plural classes (such as classes 1 and 2) together, and created "hybrid positions" between the varying categories (such as the placement of class 14).

==== Noun class pairings ====
Classes 2, 4, 6, 8, 10, and 13 are generally accepted as being the plural forms of noun classes in Proto-Bantu. Classes 14 onward do not have a plural form defined as concretely as classes 1–13 do.

Meeussen proposed pairings of 1/2, 3/4, 5/6, 7/8, 9/10, 11/10, 12/13, 14/6, 15/6, and "probably" 19/13.

Guthrie proposed pairings of 1/2, 1a/2, 3/4, 3, 5/6, 5, 6, 7/8, 9/10, 9, 11/10, 12/13, 14, 14/6.

Maho combines pairings by De Wolf, Meeussen, and Guthrie, offering alternative pairings such as 3/10, 3/13, 9/4, 11/4, 12/4, 14/4, 14/10, 15/4, 19/4, and 19/10.

== Vocabulary ==
During the last hundred years, beginning with Carl Meinhof and his students, great efforts have been made to examine the vocabulary of the approximately 550 present day Bantu languages and to try to reconstruct the proto-forms from which they presumably came. Among other recent works is that by Bastin, Coupez, and Mann, which assembled comparative examples of 92 different words from all the 16 language zones established by Guthrie.

Although some words are found only in certain of the Guthrie zones, others are found in every zone. These include for example *mbʊ́à 'dog', *-lia 'eat', *ma-béele 'breasts', *i-kúpa 'bone', *i-jína 'name', *-genda 'walk', *mʊ-kíla 'tail', *njɪla 'path', and so on. (The asterisks show that these are reconstructed forms, indicating how the words are presumed to have been pronounced before the Bantu expansion began.)

Other vocabulary items tend to be found in either one or the other of the two main Bantu dialect groups, the Western group (mainly covering Guthrie zones A, B, C, H, K, L, R) or the Eastern group (covering zones D, E, F, G, M, N, P, and S). Words reconstructed for these two groups are known as "Proto-Bantu A" ("PB-A") and "Proto-Bantu B" ("PB-B") respectively, whereas those which extend over the whole Bantu area are known as "Proto-Bantu X" (or "PB-X").

Building on the work done by A. E. Meeussen in the 1960s, a publicly searchable database of all the Bantu vocabulary items which have been established or proposed so far is maintained by the Royal Museum for Central Africa at Tervuren in Belgium (see External links).

== See also ==
- Proto-Niger–Congo language
