= Lamba people (Zambia) =

Ethnic group in Zambia

Lamba people are a Bantu ethnolinguistic group mainly located in the Central, Copperbelt, and North-Western provinces of Zambia. Lamba people speak the Lamba language, with Lamba and Lima the major dialects recognized. There are also the same Lamba people in the Katanga province of the DRC, the prominent places for them are Likasi under chief Nshindaika, Lubumbashi under chief Katanga, Kipushi under chief Kaponda. There are 8 Lamba chiefs in the following areas; chief Saili Lumbembe, Chief Katala Mokambo, Chief Mfundamina Mokambo and Nshinshimuka, chief Kombo between mukombo and Lubumbashi, chief Katanga, Lubumbashi, chief Nsakania Sakania, chief Kaponda Kiposhi up to Kolwezi and chief Nshindaika Likasi area. These are Lamba chief just like the Lambas in the Copperbelt province. The chiefs in the Copperbelt are as follows; Mushili who is the paramount chief of Lambas in both zambia and DRC, Nkana who is the group chief in the Copperbelt province called in Lamba ilamba lya busenga, others are chief Nkambo, chief Chiwala, chief Shimukunami, chief Shibuchinga, chief Lumpuma, Chief Fungulwe, Chief Ndubeni, chief Mwinuna, chief Lesa, chief Malembeka, chief Kalunkumya, chief Machiya. North western province, senior chief Kalilele, chief Mulonga, chief Chikola, chief Musaka. Central province; chief Nkole, chief Chitina, chief Chikupili, chief Mukonchi. These are the Lamba chiefs in the region called Ilamba or Lambaland. In both DRC and Zambia.

== Etymology ==
Lamba is ‘the act of humbling oneself’. Lambas are generally very humble people in nature.

== History ==
Before colonial history in the late nineteenth century, there is little information related to Lambas. Portuguese explorer Francisco de Lacerda first mentioned the Lambas, in his journal entry on 21 September 1798, recounting that Lambas were trading copper and ivory to Chief Kazembe's Lunda, and the middlemen of Nsenga country near Zumbo, the Portuguese trading post on the Zambezi.

== Social organization ==
However to understand their practices, one must analyze them through the lenses of the Lambas themselves.

There are four recognized traditional ceremonies in the Lambaland name; Chabalankata under paramount chief Mushili and the others are Ukwilimuna under chief Malembeka, Nsengele kunuka under chief Machiya and Ukupupa under senior chief Kalilele.

== See also ==
- Lamba language
- Bemba people

== Sources ==
- Doke, Clement M. The Lambas of Northern Rhodesia: A Study of their Customs and Beliefs. London: George G. Harrap, 1931
