= Tonga language (Zambia and Zimbabwe) =

Bantu language of Zambia and Zimbabwe

Tonga
- Zambezi
- isiTonga
- Native to: Zambia, Zimbabwe
- Ethnicity: Tonga, Kafwe Twa
- Native speakers: (1.5 million cited 2001–2010 census)
- Language family: Niger–Congo?: Atlantic–Congo; Benue–Congo; Bantoid; Bantu; Botatwe; Tonga
- Dialects: Plateau Tonga; Valley Tonga (We); Leya; Mala; Ndawe; Dombe
- Writing system: Latin (Tonga alphabet); Tonga Braille

Official status
- Official language in: Zambia; Zimbabwe

Language codes
- ISO 639-3: toi – inclusive code Individual code: dov – Dombe
- Glottolog: tong1318 Tonga domb1246 Toka-Leya-Dombe
- Guthrie code: M.64
- ELP: Dombe

Tonga (Chitonga), also known as Zambezi, is a Bantu language primarily spoken by the Tonga people (Bantu Batonga) who live mainly in the Southern province, Lusaka province, Central Province and Western province of Zambia, and in northern Zimbabwe. The language is also spoken by the Iwe, Toka and Leya people among others, as well as many bilingual Zambians and Zimbabweans. In Zambia Tonga is taught in schools as first language in the whole of Southern Province, Lusaka and Central Provinces.

The language is a member of the Bantu Botatwe group and is classified as M64 by Guthrie. Despite similar names, Zambian Tonga is not closely related to the Tonga of Malawi (N15), the Tonga language of Mozambique (Gitonga: S62), or Tonga of the Tete province in northwestern Mozambique, which is closely related to Sena and Nyungwe.

It is one of the major lingua francas in Zambia, together with Bemba, Lozi and Nyanja. There are two distinctive dialects of Tonga: Valley Tonga and Plateau Tonga. Valley Tonga is mostly spoken in the Zambezi valley and southern areas of the Batonga while Plateau Tonga is spoken more around Monze District and the northern areas of the Batonga.

Tonga developed as a spoken language and was not put into written form until missionaries arrived in the area in the 19th century. Although there are a growing number of publications in the language, it is not completely standardized, and speakers of the same dialect may have different spellings for the same words once put into written text.

== Phonology ==
=== Consonants ===
| | | Bilabial | Labio- dental | Alveolar | | Post- alveolar | Palatal | Velar | Glottal |
| | | Bilabial | Labio- dental | plain | pal. | Post- alveolar | Palatal | Velar | Glottal |
|---|---|---|---|---|---|---|---|---|---|
| Nasal | | m | | n | | | ɲ | ŋ | |
| Plosive/ Affricate | voiceless | p | | t | | t͡ʃ ~ c | | k | |
| Plosive/ Affricate | voiced | b | | d | | d͡ʒ ~ ɟ | | ɡ | |
| Plosive/ Affricate | prenasal vd. | ᵐb | | ⁿd | | ⁿd͡ʒ ~ ᶮɟ | | ᵑɡ | |
| Plosive/ Affricate | prenasal vl. | ᵐp | | ⁿt | | | | | |
| Fricative | voiceless | | f | s | sʲ | ʃ | | | h |
| Fricative | voiced | β | v | z | zʲ | ʒ | | ɣ | (ɦ) |
| Sonorant | voiced | | | l ~ ɾ | | | j | w | |
| Sonorant | breathy | | | | | | (j̤) | w̤ | |
| Sonorant | voiceless | | | | | | (j̊) | w̥ | |

- /l/ can also be heard as a tap sound [ɾ] in free variation.
- Post-alveolar affricates /t͡ʃ, d͡ʒ, ⁿd͡ʒ/ can also be heard as palatal stops [c, ɟ, ᶮɟ] in free variation among dialects.
- /w/ can also be heard as a labio-palatal [ɥ] when occurring before /i/.
- /f, v/ can also be heard as glottal fricatives [h, ɦ] in the Plateau dialect.
- /sʲ, zʲ/ are heard as voiceless and breathy palatal approximants [j̊, j̤] in the Northern dialects.
- At least some speakers have a bilabial nasal click where neighboring dialects have /mw/, as in mwana 'child' and kunwa 'to drink'.

=== Vowels ===
| | Front | Central | Back |
|---|---|---|---|
| Close | i iː | | u uː |
| Mid | e eː | | o oː |
| Open | | a aː | |

== Verbs ==
Tonga or Citonga follows the standard Bantu language structure. A single word may incorporate a subject-marker, a tense-marker, a direct object, and even an indirect object, combined with the verb root itself.

| Tense | Tense marker | Example |
|---|---|---|
| | Subject-(tense marker)-verb root-(ending) | First person "ndi" doing something s/he shouldn't be doing "kukuta" |
| Present Simple | -(verb root) | Ndakuta |
| Present Perfect | -a-(verb root)-ide | Ndikutide |
| Present Continuous | -la- | Ndilakuta |
| Habitual Present Tense | -la-(verb root)-a | Ndilakuta |
| Recent Past (Past of Today) | -ali-(verb root)-ide | ndalikutide |
| Simple Past | -aka- | ndakakuta |
| Recent Past Continuous | -ali-ku-(verb root) | ndalikukuta |
| Habitual Past Continuous | -akali-ku-(verb root) | Ndakalikukuta |
| Remote Past | -aka- | ndakakuta |
| Near Future | -la- | Ndilakuta |
| Simple Future | -ya-ku-(verb root)-a | Ndiyakukuta |
| Future Habitual | -niku-(verb root)-a | ndinikukuta |
| Extended Future (Tomorrow or after tomorrow) | -yaku-(verb)-a | ndiyakukuta |

== Tonal system ==
Tonga is a tonal language, with high and low-toned syllables. The placement of the tones is complex and differs from that of other Bantu languages; for example, a syllable which is low in Tonga may be high in the cognate word in other Bantu languages and vice versa. Several scholars, beginning with A. E. Meeussen in 1963, have tried to discover the rules for where to place the tones.

One feature of the tonal system is that high tones tend to get disassociated from their original place and move to the left, as is illustrated in these examples:

- íbúsi 'smoke'
- ibusu 'flour'

In these words, the original high tone of the root -sí has moved to the prefix ibu-, whereas the low tone of -su has not affected the prefix.

The above example of a noun is relatively easy to explain. However, the tones of the verbal system are more complex. An example of one of the puzzles discussed by both Meeussen and Goldsmith can be seen below:

- ndi-la-lang-a 'I am looking at'
- nda-lang-a 'I am awake'
- ba-la-lang-a 'they are looking at'
- ndi-la-bon-a 'I will see'
- nda-bon-a 'I see'
- ba-lá-bon-a 'they will see'

The high tone on the tense-marker la in the fourth verb is puzzling. If it comes from the verb root bon, it is hard to see why it does not also appear in the 1st person ndi-la-bon-a.

Some scholars, such as Carter and Goldsmith, have analysed Tonga as having both tones and accents (the accents in Tonga being mainly on low-toned syllables). Others, such as Pulleyblank, analyse the same data purely in terms of tonal rules, without the need to introduce accents.
