= Soli language =

Bantu language of southern Zambia

Soli
- Chisoli
- Native to: Zambia
- Native speakers: 34,000 (2010)
- Language family: Niger–Congo?: Atlantic–Congo; Benue–Congo; Bantoid; Bantu; Botatwe; Soli

Language codes
- ISO 639-3: sby
- Glottolog: soli1239
- Guthrie code: M.62

Soli is a Bantu language of Zambia. It is part of the Botatwe group, who live mainly in Lusaka province and Central Province together with the Tonga and Lenje people

== See also ==
- Soli people
