= Bwile people =

Regions with significant populations
- Northern Zambia,: 12,400
- Eastern Democratic Republic of the Congo: 12,400

Languages
- Bwile language

Chief Puta tells a story to an anthropologist in 1989, as part of a study of Zambian storytelling traditions

The Bwile people are an ethnic group that live in the Democratic Republic of the Congo (DRC) and Zambia around the northern part of Lake Mweru.

The Bwile language was spoken by 12,400 in Luapula Province of Zambia according to the 1969 census, and by 12,400 in the DRC as of 2002, in the Haut-Katanga Province, Pweto Territory at the north end of Lake Mweru. The Bwile people in Zambia live in the Chiengi District on the north-east shore of Lake Mweru, where they migrated from the Luba-Lunda region of the DRC. They also live in part of Nchelenge District. They occupy the northern end of the lake Mweru fishery from Kalobwa up to Lupiya.

As of 2010 the Bwile people of Zambia were led by Senior Chief Puta. Chief Nkweto of the DRC was the Paramount Chief of the Bwile people in Zambia and the DRC.
