= Kaonde language =

Bantu language spoken in Central Africa

Kaonde
- Kiikaonde
- Native to: Zambia, Democratic Republic of the Congo where it is predominantly known as Kiluba
- Native speakers: (240,000 cited 1995–2010 census)
- Language family: Niger–Congo?: Atlantic–Congo; Benue–Congo; Southern Bantoid; Bantu; Luban; Luba languages; Kaonde
- Writing system: Latin (Kaonde alphabet); Kaonde Braille

Official status
- Recognised minority language in: Zambia

Language codes
- ISO 639-3: kqn
- Glottolog: kaon1241
- Guthrie code: L.40 (L.41)

Kaonde (natively called kiiKaonde) is a Bantu language spoken primarily in Zambia. Kaonde and its dialects are spoken by over 350,000 people.

== Speakers ==
Kaonde speakers mainly live in the Northwestern and parts of Central regions of Zambia. In Zambia, the Kaonde people are found in Solwezi, Mufumbwe, Kasempa, Kalumbila and Mushindamo.

The term "Kaonde" refers to a group of people who are identified by a common language known as kiiKaonde. The Kaonde, like many other tribes in Zambia, were originally part of the Luba Kingdom. They migrated south to the area surrounding a river called the Kaonde, which is in the Congo Basin. From there, they migrated into what is now Northwestern Zambia. Native speakers refer to the language as kiiKaonde. Speakers of most other Bantu languages use the prefix "chi" rather than "kii".

Kaondes are ruled by the traditional leaders. Some of the Kaonde chiefs are: Chief Kapiji Kasongo, Chief Kizela, Chief Kasempa, and Chief Mpanga.

== Grammar ==
=== Nouns ===
Like other Bantu languages, Kaonde nouns are grouped into several semantic classes (for example: people, insects, or abstract concepts). The class to which a noun belongs determines its agreement with verbs and determiners (including adjectives, possessive pronouns, and number), and other parts of speech. When any singular class is made plural, it changes prefixes. The plural of a mu- class noun will always be a ba- class noun. (For example: “muntu”, which means “person”, pluralizes to “bantu”, which means “people”. The word “bantu” commands the agreement “ba” — for example: “Bantu balaala” — “the people are sleeping”, while the singular form commands the “u” agreement: “muntu walaala”.

Singular noun	Singular concord	Plural noun	Plural concord
mu (person)	u-	ba	ba-
mu (thing)	u -	mi-	i-
ki	ki-	bi	bi-
ka	ka-	tu	tu-
n	i-	ma	a-
lu	lu-	ma	a-
bu	bu-	ma	a-
ji	ji-	ma	a-
pa (locative "on")	pa-	none	none
ku (locative "at" or "to")	ku-	none	none
mu (locative "in")	mu-	none	none

Not all nouns begin with the same letters as their class prefix, but any noun’s class can be determined by the agreements it commands. For example, “nzolo” (chicken) is a mu- class noun despite beginning with the initial nasal characteristic of the n- class which commands the agreement “i” or “ya”. “Nzolo” is not an n- class noun, because it commands “u” and “wa” agreements, as in: “nzolo walaala” — “the chicken is sleeping”.

=== Pronouns ===
Kaonde has personal, demonstrative and relative pronouns. The first and second person pronouns are independent of the noun class system. Third person pronouns are formed using the demonstrative pronouns for the ba noun class. Demonstrative are arranged by noun class and by deixis.

	Singular	Plural/Formal
1st person	amiwa	atweba
2nd person	obewa	anweba
3rd person	awe/ao/awa	abe/abo/aba

Sample text in Kaonde

Mu byambo byanji byalamata bantu bonse, Lesa waambile ne byambo bikwabo pa byo anemeka bumi ne mashi.

Translation

In a declaration applying to all humans, God revealed more about his evaluation of life and blood
