= Zambian Sign Language =

Deaf sign language of Zambia

- ZSL
- Native to: Zambia
- Signers: 14,000 out of 16,000 deaf (2008)
- Language family: unclassified

Language codes
- ISO 639-3: zsl
- Glottolog: zamb1239

Zambian Sign Language is a sign language used by the Deaf community in Zambia. It is not clear how many Zambians use Zambian Sign Language, although it is taught in some special schools and interpreters appear on some television programmes. The Association of Sign Language Interpreters of Zambia (ASLIZ) is involved in promoting greater support for and recognition of Zambian Sign Language in schools, in the government and in entertainment media such as television.
