= Totela language =

Bantu language in Southern Africa

Totela
- Echitotela
- Region: Namibia, Zambia
- Native speakers: 1,220 (2010 census)
- Language family: Niger–Congo?: Atlantic–Congo; Benue–Congo; Southern Bantoid; Bantu; Botatwe; Subia?; Totela

Language codes
- ISO 639-3: ttl
- Glottolog: tote1238
- Guthrie code: K.41,411

Totela is a Bantu language of Namibia and Zambia. It is spoken by the Totela people, a Bantu ethnic group of the Lozi. Its classification is assumed rather than demonstrated.
