= Lenje language =

Bantu language spoken in Zambia

Lenje
- Chilenje
- Native to: Zambia
- Native speakers: 130,000 (2010 census)
- Language family: Niger–Congo?: Atlantic–Congo; Benue–Congo; Bantoid; Bantu; Botatwe; Lenje
- Dialects: Lukanga (Twa)

Language codes
- ISO 639-3: leh
- Glottolog: lenj1248
- Guthrie code: M.61,611

Lenje is a Bantu language of central Zambia. The Lukanga dialect is spoken by the Lukanga Twa Pygmies, fishermen of the Lukanga Swamp. Alternate names for the language are Chilenje, Chinamukuni, Ciina, Ciina Mukuni, Lengi, Lenji, and Mukuni.
