= Bemba language =

Bantu language of northeastern Zambia

Bemba
- Chibemba
- Native to: Zambia, Democratic Republic of the Congo, Tanzania
- Ethnicity: Bemba, Bangweulu Batwa
- Native speakers: (4.1 million cited 2000–2010 census)
- Language family: Niger–Congo?: Atlantic–Congo; Volta-Congo; Benue–Congo; Bantoid; Southern Bantoid; Bantu (Zone M.40–50); Sabi; South Sabi; Bemba
- Dialects: Town Bemba
- Writing system: Latin (Bemba alphabet); Bemba Braille

Official status
- Official language in: Zambia

Language codes
- ISO 639-2: bem
- ISO 639-3: bem
- Glottolog: bemb1257
- Guthrie code: M.42
- Linguasphere: 99-AUR-r ichiBemba + ichiLamba incl. 24 inner languages 99-AUR-ra...-rx + varieties 99-AUR-rca...-rsb

A speaker of the Bemba, recorded in Zambia.

- Person: MuBemba
- People: BaBemba, Awemba, BaWemba
- Language: ChiBemba
- Country: Bembaland

Bemba (also known as Zambian or natively known as Chibemba, Ichibemba and Chiwemba) is a Bantu language spoken primarily in north-eastern Zambia by the Bemba people.

== History ==
Bemba is spoken in rural and urban areas of the region, and is one of Zambia's seven recognized regional languages.

== Dialects ==
Bemba has several dialects, which include Chishinga, Lomotwa, Ngoma, Nwesi, Lala, Luunda, Mukulu, and Ng’umbo. The Twa of Bangweulu speak another dialect of Bemba.

== Phonology and orthography ==
Consonants
			Labial	Alveolar	Palatal	Velar
Nasal			m	n	ɲ	ŋ
Plosive/ Affricate	plain		p	t	t͡ʃ	k
Plosive/ Affricate	prenasal	voiceless	ᵐp	ⁿt	ⁿt͡ʃ	ᵑk
Plosive/ Affricate	prenasal	voiced	ᵐb	ⁿd	ⁿd͡ʒ	ᵑɡ
Fricative	plain	voiceless	f	s	ʃ	
Fricative	plain	voiced	β			
Fricative	prenasal		ᶬf	ⁿs	ⁿʃ	
Lateral				l		
Approximant			(β)		j	w

Vowels
	Front		Central		Back	
	short	long	short	long	short	long
High	i	iː			u	uː
Mid	e	eː			o	oː
Low			a	aː		

The orthographical system in common use, originally introduced by Edward Steere, is quite phonetic. Its letters, with their approximate phonetic values, are given below.

Letter:	A	B	C/Ch	D	E	F	G	I	J	K	L	M	N	Ng'	Ny	O	P	S	Sh	T	U	W	Y
Value:	a	b, β	tʃ	d	e	f	ɡ	i	dʒ	k	l	m	n	ŋ	ɲ	o	p	s	ʃ	t	u	w	j

It has become increasingly common to use 'c' in place of 'ch'. In common with other Bantu languages, as affixes are added, combinations of vowels may contract and consonants may change. For example, 'aa' changes to a long 'a', 'ae' and 'ai' change to 'e', and 'ao' and 'au' change to 'o' (in other cases, a 'y' is often used to separate other combinations of vowels). The nasal 'n' changes to 'm' before 'b' or 'p', and is pronounced ŋ before 'k' or 'g'; after 'n', 'l' changes to 'd'. These rules will all be implicit in the tables given below.

Like many Bantu languages, Bemba is tonal, with two tones. However, tone has limited effect on meaning as the number of words that would otherwise be confused is small. Stress tends to fall on the prefix, when it exists, and can lead to subtle differences of meaning (see the verb forms below).

Detailed analyses of the tonology and phonology of Bemba can be found in work like: Bickmore & Kula (2013), Kula & Bickmore (2015), Hamann & Kula (2015) and Kula & Hamann (2017).

== Grammar ==
Many of the main features of Bemba grammar are fairly typical of Bantu languages: it is agglutinative, depends mainly on prefixes, has a system of several noun classes, a large set of verbal aspects and tenses, very few actual adjectives, and, like English, has a word order that is subject-verb-object. Most of the classification here is taken from that given by Schoeffer, Sheane and Cornwallis.

=== Nouns ===
Bemba nouns are divided into several partially-semantic classes. They are indicated by their prefixes and are generally similar but not always identical to the concord prefixes, attached to verbs they govern, adjectives qualifying them, and pronouns standing for them. By one convention, based on the plural, they are arranged as follows (most alternate forms are caused by phonetic considerations):

Class	Singular prefix	Concord prefix (singular)	Plural prefix	Concord prefix (plural)	Notes
1	mu-, mw-, m-	a (verbs), mu (adjectives), u/w (pronouns)	ba-	ba-	persons, and several inanimate nouns
2	mu-	u- (sometimes mu- for adjectives)	mi-	i- (sometimes mi- for adjectives)	generally inanimate nouns, and most trees and fruit
3	n-, lu-	i (sometimes n- for adjectives), lu-	n-	shi-	generally not human nouns
4	chi-/ch- (ichi-)	chi-/ch-	fi-/fy-/f- (ifi-)	fi-/fy-/f-	augmentatives, kinds, languages
5	li-, ku-, bu-, lu-	same as noun prefix	ma-	ya- (sometimes ma- for adjectives)	Plural can be used for singulars of class 3 to emphasise larger number or size
6	ka-	ka	tu-	tu-	diminutives
7	bu-	bu-	none	none	abstract nouns
8	ku-	ku-	none	none	infinitives
9	ku-, mu-, pa-	same as noun prefix			not strictly a noun class (see below)

The prefixes in class 9 essentially indicate case: 'ku-' corresponds to 'to' or 'from', 'mu-' to 'in', 'into', or 'out of', and 'pa-' to 'at'.

=== Adjectives ===
As is common in Bantu languages, adjectives follow the words they qualify, and take the adjectival concord prefixes, but there are not many of them in the strictest sense. Adverbs, relative clauses, or 'descriptors', often fulfil their function instead. Descriptors are placed after the noun, with the particle '-a', and the relevant pronoun prefix between them: chintu cha nomba, 'new thing'.

=== Numerals ===
The numbers from 1 to 10 are:

English:	1	2	3	4	5	6	7	8	9	10
Bemba:	-mo	-bili	-tatu	-ne	-sano	-mutanda	-cine lubali	-cine konse konse	-pabula	-ikumi

The numerals 1-5 take adjectival concord prefixes (except for class 1 singular: muntu umo, 'one person'). The numerals 6-10 are left unchanged. 'Ikumi' has the plural 'makumi', which can be used as a noun with 'na' (and, with) to form all numbers up to 99: for example, makumi yatatu na pabula, 'thirty nine'. 100 is 'mwanda', with plural 'myanda'.

=== Pronouns ===
The class-independent personal pronouns are: 'ine' (1st person sg.), 'iwe' (2nd person sg.), 'ifwe' (1st person pl.), 'imwe' (2nd person pl.). These are absolute, in the sense that they stand alone, and cannot appear as subjects or objects as they are. There are separate possessive pronouns, and the third person pronouns depend on class. There are also demonstrative pronouns, divided both by class and into three kinds by deixis ('this one, that one, and that one over there'), and relative pronouns are formed from these.

=== Verbs ===
Verbs have simple forms, usually ending in '-a' (everything before the 'a' being the 'stem', 'root' or 'radical'), and are agglutinated according to person, number and class of subject and object, tense, mood, voice, aspect and whether they are affirmative or negative. Further, their stems change to indicate various other shades of meaning. The following rules can all be combined in a mostly straightforward manner, Bemba being agglutinative and not inflective, but there are still some exceptions.

==== Subject and object prefixes ====
The subject and object prefixes for the personal pronouns are given below. These can vary slightly according to mood, and the subject prefixes change for negative verbs. Where they are different, object prefixes are given in brackets.

		Affirmative	Negative
1st person	singular	n-	nshi-, shi-
1st person	plural	tu-	tatu-
2nd person	singular	u- (ku-)	tau-
2nd person	plural	mu-	tamu-
3rd person	singular	a- (mu-)	taa-, ta-
3rd person	plural	ba-	taba-

The subject prefix is placed first, and then the object prefix. When the subject or object is a specific noun in a given class, the verbal concord prefix of this class is used, and the negative form adds the prefix 'ta-' before this.

==== Tenses and Aspects ====
The classification given here is that presented by Schoeffer.

Some of these require a modified stem, changing final 'a' to 'ile' if the preceding vowel is 'a', 'i' or 'u', and to 'ele' if it is 'e' or 'o', or, if the last consonant is nasal, changing the 'a' to 'ine' or 'ene' accordingly. There are irregularities in several verbs.

The tense prefixes are given below. They come after the subject and object prefixes, and before the verb stem, except for the recent, completed or historic past in 'na-', which appears at the very beginning. Stress is marked with an acute (´) accent.

Tense/aspect	Prefix	Stem	Notes
Present continuative	le	unmodified	Used for verbs of action to indicate a progressive action; can be used adjectivally, and even as an immediate future (especially when used with verbs of state).
Present definite	a	unmodified	Used for verbs of state, and intransitive verbs
Stative, necessary habitual	Ordinary form; no prefix	unmodified	Indicates a state that is always true, or a habitual action; connotes necessity of the action
Voluntary habitual	la	unmodified	For habitual actions, connoting that they are voluntary, or may otherwise not be necessary; used only for verbs of state; can be used in subordinate clauses
Immediate past	a	unmodified	For actions occurring 'today', or 'nowadays'
Recent, completed or historic past	na- (prefix)	unmodified	For actions completed today; can be used in a historic sense, but does not emphasise a distant past
Specific past	(no prefix)	modified	Also used for actions done 'today' or 'nowadays', but emphasising more distance in time than the previous two; used in relative clauses
Simple past of yesterday (1)	ali	unmodified	The stress must not be on the 'a' of the prefix
Simple past of yesterday (2)	a	modified	The stress must not be on the prefix
Remote past simple	á	modified	
Remote past of duration	ali	modified	For remote actions whose effects are still present, or for states established in the remote past which have not changed
Remote past definite, past perfect	áli	unmodified	A remote past further distant than some other relevant time
Past imperfect or habitual	ale	unmodified	Used for actions once, but no longer, habitual
Immediate future	ala	unmodified	
Immediate progressive or habitual future	akula	unmodified	
Proximal future	le	unmodified	For future states and conditions to be established shortly, but not necessarily immediately
Future indefinite	ka	unmodified	For actions and states at some unknown time in the future
Future indefinite habitual	kala	unmodified	For habitual actions and states at some unknown time in the future

==== Moods ====
The moods correspond closely to the Bantu norms.

===== Imperative =====
The simple singular imperative is identical to the 'dictionary' form of the verb consisting of the stem and the suffix '-a', changing to an '-e' if an object prefix is used - there is no subject prefix. The simple plural imperative changes '-a' to '-eni'. Prefixing 'aku-' or 'uka-', adds a sense of instruction to resume or continue an action. An emphatic form can be given by using the subject pronoun prefix (generally of class 1) and following this by the prefix '-inda-'.

===== Subjunctive =====
The subjunctive is used hypothetically, as an indirect imperative, in exhortations, and in subordinate clauses, similarly but not identically to the subjunctive of many European languages. The common feature is a change of the final '-a' of the verb to '-e'. Its forms are given below. Here V stands for the verb stem, and P for any pronoun prefixes. The usual phonological rules apply.

Tense/aspect	Prefix	Notes
Simple present	P-V-e	Used for the present and for verbs for which time is not specified
Present of movement	ka-P-V-e	Expresses a change in position, state or mental attitude
Present of insistence, exhortative	na-P-V-e	Similar to a first-person plural imperative
Future immediate	P-le-V-a	Same as the indicative
Future immediate of insistence	na-P-le-V-a	Also used as an exhortative, or indirect imperative; can take plural in -eni when used imperatively
Future remote momentary	P-ka-V-e	Used for a single action in the remote future
Future remote continuous	P-kale-V-a	Used for a progressive or habitual action in the remote future
Future remote of insistence	shina-P-V-e	Used as an indirect imperative for some unknown remote future time

The infinitive, strictly a verbal noun, has two forms. The simple form has prefix 'ku-' added to the simple form, as mentioned above, and the habitual infinitive has prefix 'kula-'.

==== Voices ====
The passive is formed by placing the suffix '-w-' before the last vowel of the verb, but it is not frequently used. A 'neutral' voice can be formed by using '-ik-' instead if the preceding vowel is a, i or u, and '-ek-' if the preceding vowel is e or o. This form is differs in meaning from the passive in that it emphasises the state resulting from an action rather than the action itself (cf. English 'the pot is broken', as opposed to 'the ball is kicked').

==== Negation ====
Generally, the indicative prefixes 'ta-' to the subject prefix except for the first person singular which changes to 'nshi' or 'shi'. Generally, the subjunctive adds 'i' after the pronoun prefixes and in most cases changes a final 'e' to 'a'. The infinitive occasionally uses the negative 'te'. However, the precise rules are more complex, and the forms depend more finely on tense, aspect and mood. When the negative is used with the imperfect 'le', it is often in the sense of action not yet done, and is referred to by Schoeffer as a separate 'deferred tense'.

==== Other forms ====
There are several other verb forms which change the stem by adding an extra syllable before the final 'a'. These are given below.

Tense/aspect	Form	Notes
Applied	The modified stem, with 'a' (instead of 'e' for the specific past).	Used to make an object indirect, usually translated by adding a preposition like 'for' after the verb
Completive	Doubles vowel-consonant pair of the applied stem (e.g., fikila becomes fikilila, from fika, 'to arrive')	Expresses completion or finality of an action
Reciprocal	V-na (or V-nya if V ends in y)	Expressing actions done to 'each other'
Causative	Softens the last consonant accordingly: 'ba', 'pa' to 'fya'; 'nda', 'ka' 'la', 'sa', 'ta', to 'shya' or 'ishya', 'ushya'; adds 'y' before the 'a' of 'ema', 'ima', 'uma', 'ana'; adds 'ik' before the 'a' of 'ala', 'ama', 'ana'	Several exceptions exist; 'ishya' and 'ushya' is particularly common for verbs of colour
Intensive	Changes 'a' to 'ishya' if preceding vowel is 'a', 'i', 'u'; changes 'a' to 'eshya' if 'e', 'o'	Adds emphasis or a sense of energy to the verb
Reversive	Changes 'a' to 'ula' or 'ulula' if preceding vowel is 'a', 'i', 'u'; changes 'a' to 'ola' or 'olola' if 'e', 'o'	Expresses a reversal of an action (cf. English 'do', 'undo')
Frequentative	Changes 'a' to 'ula'	Expresses frequent repetition of an action; translatable by the adverb 'repeatedly'
Reflexive	Prefixes 'i' to the verb stem	Expresses doing 'to oneself'

There are also several compound tenses, many using the copula 'kuli' and 'kuba'.

=== Conjunctions ===
These are used to introduce coordinating or subordinate clauses, similarly to their use in English.

== Basic phrases ==
- ee - yes
- awe - no
- Uli shani? - how are you (informal)
- Muli shani? - how are you (formal)
- Shaleenipo - goodbye
- Ishina lyandi ni... - My name is...
- umuntu - person
- umunandi - friend
- umwana - child
- iciBemba - the Bemba language
- na - and, with
- nga - like, as
- suma (adj.) - good/beautiful
- ulimusuma - you're beautiful
- onse (adj.) - all
- uluceelo (adj) - morning
- Natotela - Thank you
- Saana or Ifingi - A lot
- Natotela saana - Thanks a lot
- Lesa wabonse - God is for Everyone
- Bonse - Everyone
- Lesa - God
- Wa- Is
- Akasuba - Afternoon
- Ichungulo - Evening
- Ubushiku - Night
- Zambia Ku Chalo - Zambia to the World
- Chalo - World
- Chola - Bag
- Malumbo - Praise
- Amalaila - Praise
- Nimwebo - It is you
- Kapala - A blesser
- Twapapata - Please
- Twamipapata - We are begging you
- Ichipuba - Fool
- Umwaume - Man
- Umulumendo - Boy
- Umukashana - Girl
- Amafi - Feaces
- Imisu - Urine
- Ukutumpa - Stupid
- Yeka or Weka - Only
- Imbwa - Dog
- Koswe - Rat
- Kolwe - Monkey

== Literature ==
There is a sizeable amount of literature in Bemba. There are narratives, poems and plays. Some of the notable writers in Bemba include Stephen Mpashi, Chongo Kasonkomona, Chishimba, Paul Mushindo, Bwalya Chilangwa, Mwila Launshi and Kambole.

A lot of the novels and narratives in Bemba were written between the period 1950 and 1980. Recently, very few creative works are published in Zambia mainly due to two reasons: the readership is generally poor and secondly, because of the first reason, publishers tend to hesitate to publish creative works in Bemba, especially novels of substantial length, for financial reasons due to the likely low levels of readership and thus profit. Instead, there are many short stories and novellas in Bemba literature.

Moreover, there seem to be many talented writers who would like to write in this language but could not because of the reasons given above, as well as limited publishing opportunities, lack of financial support, and limited access to readers.

In terms of literary criticism, a lot of the works in Bemba have not been reviewed and critiqued. This is because there are very few literary critics in Bemba, though the interest is slowly growing. Some of these include Lutato and Shadreck Kondala, among others. Classic Bemba books include Uwauma Nafyala, Pano Calo and Imilimo ya bena Kale.

== Sample text ==
Abantu bonse bafyalwa abalubuka nokulingana mu mucinshi nensambu. Balikwata amano nokutontonkanya, eico bafwile ukulacita ifintu ku banabo mu mutima wa bwananyina.

Translation

All human beings are born free and equal in dignity and rights. They are endowed with reason and conscience and should act towards one another in a spirit of brotherhood.

(Article 1 of the Universal Declaration of Human Rights)

== See also ==
- Bemba people
- Bantu languages
