= List of ambassadors of Zambia to the United States =

Coordinates: 38°54′52.7″N 77°3′12.5″W

Ambassador of Zambia to the United States Embassy of Zambia, Washington, D.C.
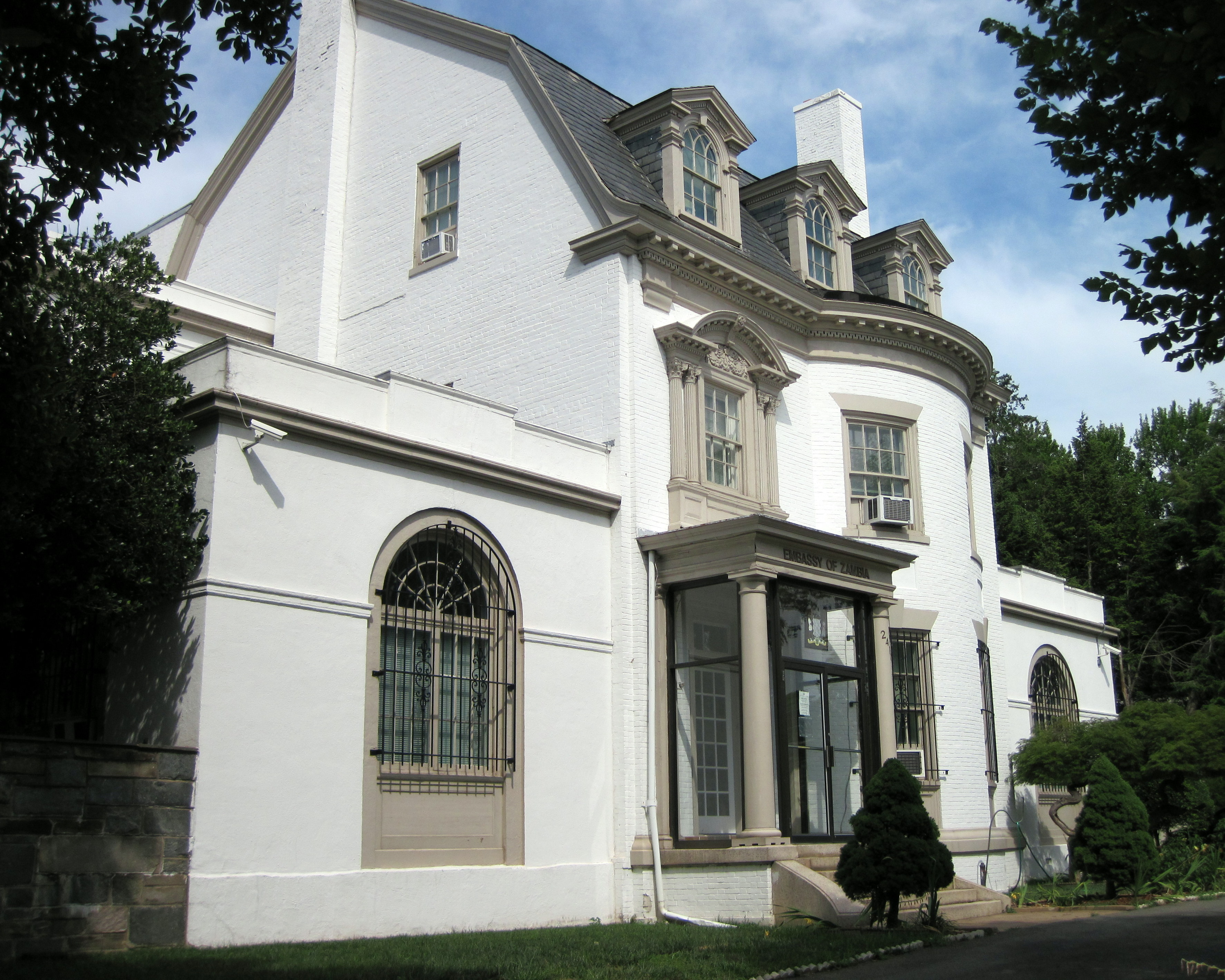
- Inaugural holder: Hosea Josias Soko
- Formation: November 24, 1964

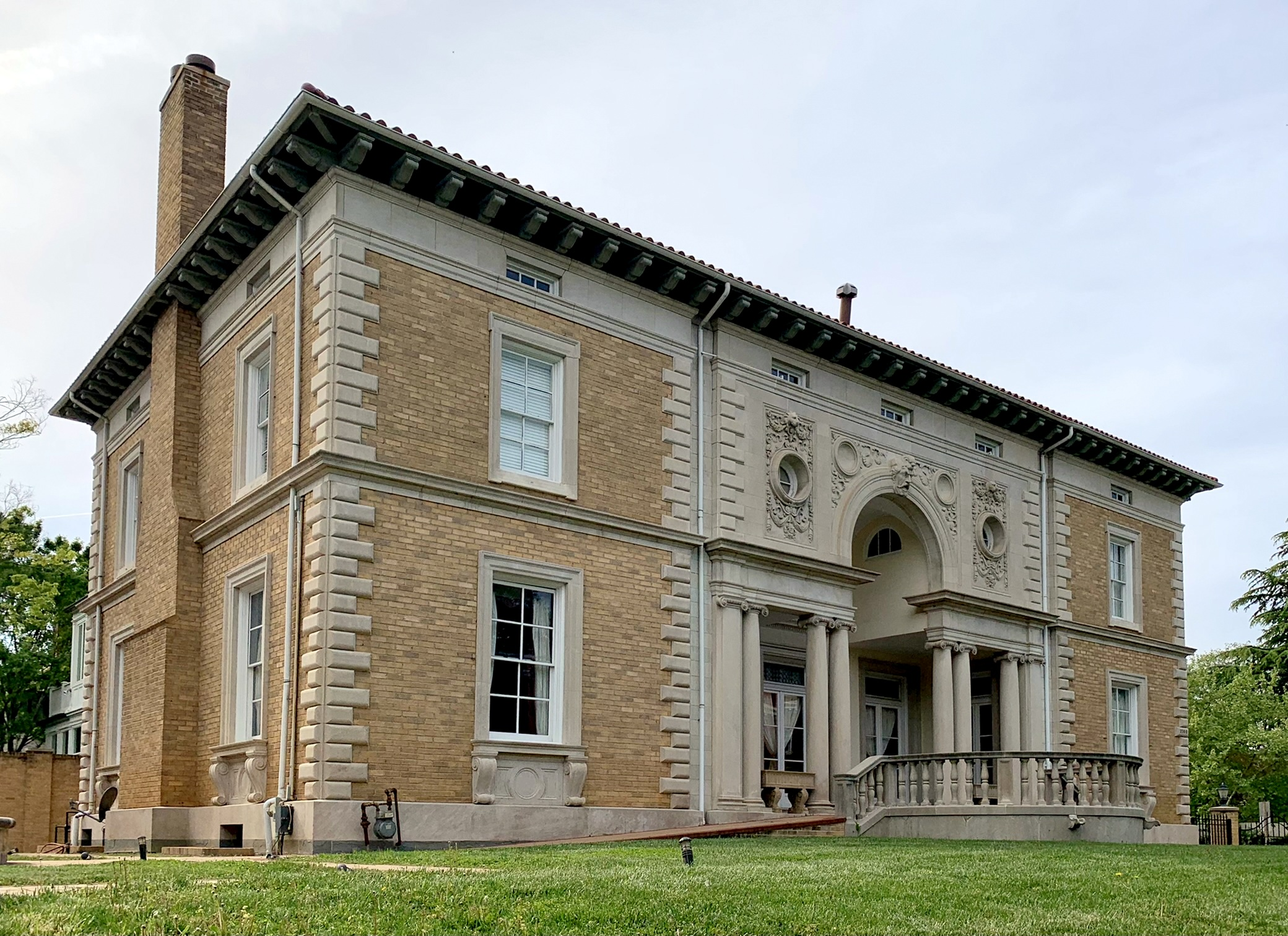
The Zambian ambassadorial residence in Washington, D.C.

The Zambian ambassador in Washington, D. C. is the official representative of the Government in Lusaka to the Government of the United States.

== List of representatives ==
Diplomatic agrément	Diplomatic accreditation	Ambassador	Observations	List of presidents of Zambia	List of presidents of the United States	Term end
August 4, 1964	August 12, 1964		Request to Open Mission/Request Granted	Kenneth Kaunda	Lyndon B. Johnson	
	December 15, 1964		EMBASSY OPENED	Kenneth Kaunda	Lyndon B. Johnson	
December 15, 1964	November 24, 1964	Hosea Josias Soko		Kenneth Kaunda	Lyndon B. Johnson	
July 5, 1966	July 19, 1966	Samuel Chinyama Mbilishi		Kenneth Kaunda	Lyndon B. Johnson	
April 4, 1967	April 7, 1967	Rupiah Banda		Kenneth Kaunda	Lyndon B. Johnson	
December 22, 1969	February 3, 1970	Mainza Chona		Kenneth Kaunda	Richard Nixon	
December 2, 1970	December 21, 1970	Andrew B. Mutemba		Kenneth Kaunda	Richard Nixon	
July 15, 1971		Simon J. M. Mwanba	Chargé d'affaires	Kenneth Kaunda	Richard Nixon	
August 26, 1971	January 21, 1973	Unia Gostel Mwila		Kenneth Kaunda	Richard Nixon	
January 28, 1974		Joshua Simasiku Siyolwe	Chargé d'affaires	Kenneth Kaunda	Gerald Ford	
May 31, 1974	June 5, 1974	Siteke Gibson Mwale		Kenneth Kaunda	Gerald Ford	
August 5, 1976		Fidelis F. Bwalya	Chargé d'affaires	Kenneth Kaunda	Gerald Ford	
July 14, 1977	July 29, 1977	Putteho Muketoi Ngonda		Kenneth Kaunda	Jimmy Carter	
September 19, 1985	November 5, 1985	Nalumino Mundia		Kenneth Kaunda	Ronald Reagan	
September 21, 1989	October 24, 1989	Paul J. F. Lusaka		Kenneth Kaunda	George H. W. Bush	
July 9, 1992	September 8, 1992	Dunstan Weston Kamana		Frederick Chiluba	George H. W. Bush	
June 19, 2000	September 5, 2000	Atan Shansonga		Frederick Chiluba	Bill Clinton	
February 7, 2003	February 26, 2003	Inonge Mbikusita-Lewanika		Levy Mwanawasa	George W. Bush	
June 25, 2010	June 28, 2010	Shelia Z. Siwela		Rupiah Banda	Barack Obama	
January 8, 2013	January 14, 2013	Palan Mulonda		Michael Sata	Barack Obama	
January 2020	April 8, 2020	Lazarous Kapambwe		Edgar Lungu	Joe Biden	August 24, 2021
