= Luke Mwananshiku =

Zambian politician

Minister of Foreign Affairs
- In office 1986–1990
- President: Kenneth Kaunda
- Prime Minister: Kebby Musokotwane; Malimba Masheke
- Preceded by: Lameck Goma
- Succeeded by: Benjamin Mibenge

Minister of Finance and National Planning
- In office 1983–1985
- President: Kenneth Kaunda
- Prime Minister: Nalumino Mundia
- Preceded by: Kebby Musokotwane
- Succeeded by: Lavu Mulimba

Governor of the Bank of Zambia
- In office 1976–1981
- President: Kenneth Kaunda
- Preceded by: Bitwell Kuwani
- Succeeded by: Bitwell Kuwani

Personal details
- Born: 1938
- Died: 2 March 2003 (aged 64–65)
- Occupation: Economist

Luke Mwananshiku (1938 – March 2, 2003) was a Zambian banker, businessman, politician and diplomat. He was a government minister under Zambia's first president, Kenneth Kaunda, serving as the governor of the Bank of Zambia from 1976 to 1981, and as Minister of Foreign Affairs from 1986 to 1990. Mwananshiku was also Minister of Finance from 1982 to 1987. He served as a director of the Zambia Consolidated Copper Mines and of the International Monetary Fund. He died at the Trust Hospital in Lusaka of heart failure in 2003.
