= Kapwepwe =

Kapwepwe is a surname. It may refer to:

- Chileshe Kapwepwe, Zambian accountant and corporate executive
- Mulenga Kapwepwe or Mpundu Kapwepwe (born 1958), Zambian author, co-founder of the Zambian Women's History Museum. Daughter to Simon Kapwepwe
- Simon Kapwepwe (1922–1980), Zambian politician, Vice President of Zambia from 1967 to 1970

== See also ==
- Simon Mwansa Kapwepwe International Airport, Ndola, northern Zambia
