= Dunstan Kamana =

Zambian journalist (1937–2009)

Ambassador of Zambia to the United States of America
- In office 9 July 1992 – 8 September 1992
- President: Frederick Chiluba
- Preceded by: Paul J. F. Lusaka
- Succeeded by: Atan Shansonga

Permanent Representative of Zambia to the United Nations
- In office 22 August 1975 – 7 June 1977
- President: Kenneth Kaunda
- Preceded by: Rupiah Banda
- Succeeded by: Gwendoline Konie

High Commissioner of Zambia to Canada
- In office 1974–1976
- President: Kenneth Kaunda

Ambassador of Zambia to the Soviet Union
- In office 6 September 1972 – 1974
- President: Kenneth Kaunda
- Preceded by: Paul J. F. Lusaka
- Succeeded by: Denny Sibajene

Personal details
- Born: Dunstan Weston Kamana; 19 April 1937 Choma, Zambia
- Died: 13 September 2009 (aged 72)

Dunstan Weston Kamana (19 April 1937 – 13 September 2009) was a Zambian journalist, Permanent Representative of Zambia to the United Nations former ambassador to the United States ambassador to the Soviet Union and Zambia's High Commissioner to Canada. He had also served as the Presidential Press Secretary to Kenneth Kaunda.

== Life and career ==
Kamana was educated at St Mark’s College in Mapanza. In January 1965 he was appointed as Presidential Press Secretary, a post he held until July 1966 when he became Director of Information for the next two years. He later became first Zambian editor in chief of the Times of Zambia, serving as such until 1972 when he was appointed general manager of the Dairy Produce Board. Later that same year he was sent to Moscow as ambassador to the Soviet Union where he served for two years. He was then appointed as Zambia's High Commissioner to Canada from 1974 until 1976.
