= Leading Ladies (podcast) =

Zambian podcast web series

'Leading Ladies'
- Leading Ladies Exhibitions Image Front Page
- Genre: Historical
- Language: English

Creative team
- Written by: Mulenga Kapwepwe and Samba Yonga

Cast and voices
- Narrated by: Samba Yonga

Production
- Motion graphics: Black Rose The Artist
- Length: 2 minutes

Publication
- No. of seasons: 3
- No. of episodes: 21
- Original release: 27 March 2019; 7 years ago
- Updates: Weekly

Leading Ladies is a short 2D animated podcast originating from Zambia. The podcast was first released on YouTube, Facebook, and LinkedIn on March 27, 2019. The podcast focuses on the lives of significant African women who held leadership positions between the 17th and 19th century The primary objective of the podcast is to shed light on the obscured and often hidden stories of Zambian women who have held significant leadership roles throughout history.

The Women's History Museum in Zambia and Hivos Southern Africa Region jointly produce the animated podcast. The podcast's stories are set across Zambia's 10 provinces and were sourced from the National Archives of Zambia. The podcast's first season was written by Mulenga Kapwepwe and Samba Yonga and premiered on March 27, 2019. It explored the lives of women who made important but often untold contributions to Zambia's history during the pre-colonial era.

The podcast's second season, which premiered on September 16, 2020, presents more contemporary accounts of Zambian leading ladies. The podcast serves as a means of educating and inspiring audiences on the significant impact of women's leadership in Zambia's history.

== Seasons ==
=== Season one ===
The debut season featured women from the pre-colonial era who have made important but largely untold contributions to Zambia's history.

No.	Title	Original release date
1	"The General"	27 March 2019
This story is of Changwe Mwape the II, daughter to Namukwanga Mwape I she ruled the Ambo people of present day Muchinga Province in Zambia. By the time of her death in 1910, Mwape reigned over the Milambo, Lukusashi and Lower Luangwa. To the east of the Luangwa, she controlled the Nyamadzi valley.
2	"The Secretary of State"	3 April 2019
This story was during the Scramble for Africa, Mukwae Matauka wrote a letter to the government of Italy demanding that they clearly delineate her land from that of the Portuguese and stop them from infringing on her people's rights.
3	"The Warrior "Loongo""	10 April 2019
To protect her land, Loongo organised an all-women army and fought the Makololo. The women left a mark on the Makololo ranks through their sheer courage and determination.
4	"The Peacemaker "Na Chituti""	17 April 2019
"Na Chituti was given a praise name and thereafter called Na Chituti, uwa abwishe u Luunda, meaning, Na Chituti, the one who made it possible for the Luunda to settle peacefully in Shila country." Till today Na Chituti's treaty is enacted at the Mutumboko ceremony by the current Mwata Kazembe and Na Chituti.
5	""Lueji" Wa Nkonde"	24 April 2019
The reality is that women have been quite influential on the geopolitical landscape of Zambia like Lueji Wa Nkonde. She ruled the Luunda federation of Tubungo in the 1650s, from her capital at Kasala Katoki..
6	"The Power Broker "Ntemba""	1 May 2019
Ntemba held the Bisa-Chewa coalition together for a long time. On her deathbed, she requested that her daughter Chidote succeed her. Chidote settled on the banks of the Lukusizi River. Over time this group eventually dispersed and disappeared. Women have been formidable political opponents.
7	"The Feminist "Chikuku (Nkomeshya)""	8 May 2019
"All her life, Chikuku ensured that Soli political power remained vested in female hands."
8	"Kabunda"	15 May 2019
In a land where people heavily depended on hunting and gathering, Kabunda introduced agriculture. Thanks to her generosity, her brother Chipimpi became the first chief of the Lamba in modern-day Copperbelt."
9	"The Diplomat "Mwenya Mukulu""	22 May 2019
The story of a woman who took part in the affairs of diplomacy"
10	"Head of State "Be Dyango""	29 May 2019
Women have been prominent leaders of state for centuries. Meet Be Dyango, Southern Province 18th Century the Head of State.

=== Season two ===
Season two is focus on the post-colonial narrative of women's leadership that has not been fully explored. The second season of the series start airing on 16 September 2020 on the museum's online platforms. The web series will be free and available for everyone to access.
