= Ngosa =

Ngosa is an African name that may refer to:

== Given name ==
- Ngosa Simbyakula (born 1954), Zambian diplomat
- Ngosa Sunzu (born 1998), Zambian footballer
