= Musokotwane =

Musokotwane is an African surname. Notable people with the surname include:

- Kebby Musokotwane (1946–1996), Zambian politician
- Situmbeko Musokotwane (born 1956), Zambian politician and economist
