= Kapambwe =

Kapambwe is a both a Zambian given name and surname. Notable people with the name include:

== Given name ==
- Kapambwe Mulenga (1963–1996), Zambian footballer

== Surname ==
- Constantino Kapambwe (born 1940), Zambian long-distance runner
- Lazarous Kapambwe (born 1959), Zambian diplomat
