= Salome Kapwepwe =

Zambian freedom fighter & teacher

- Salome in 2016

Personal details
- Born: Salome Chilufya Besa; 8 August 1926 Chinsali, Northern Rhodesia (now Zambia)
- Died: 9 May 2017 (aged 90) Lusaka
- Spouse: Simon Kapwepwe (m. 1946)
- Children: 8; including Chileshe Kapwepwe & Mulenga Kapwepwe

Salome Kapwepwe (August 8, 1926 – May 9, 2017) was a Zambian freedom fighter and educator, known for her pivotal role in the country's struggle for independence. Additionally, she was the wife of Simon Mwansa Kapwepwe, a prominent Zambian nationalist and vice-president of Zambia.

== Early life and career ==
Salome Chilufya Besa was born on August 8, 1926, at Lubwa Mission in Chinsali District, now Muchinga Province. She commenced her teaching career in 1946 at Lubwa, where she met Simon Kapwepwe, whom she would later marry. Together, they were transferred to Nkula and subsequently to Wusakile Primary School in 1948, where they both worked as educators.

=== Activism ===
Salome Kapwepwe played an instrumental role in Zambia's struggle for independence, working alongside her husband Simon and other prominent activists such as Kenneth Kaunda. Together, they advocated for Zambia's freedom from British colonial rule and actively participated in the movement for national self-determination.

== Death ==
Kapwepwe died on May 8, 2017, at the age of 90, in her sleep. She was laid to rest on May 13, 2017, at her home in Chinsali. Her legacy as a prominent Zambian freedom fighter and educator continues to inspire generations of Zambians.
