= Mohamed Mansour Kadah =

Egyptian diplomat and Assistant Secretary-General of COMESA

His Excellency Mohamed Mansour Kadah
- محمد منصور قدح
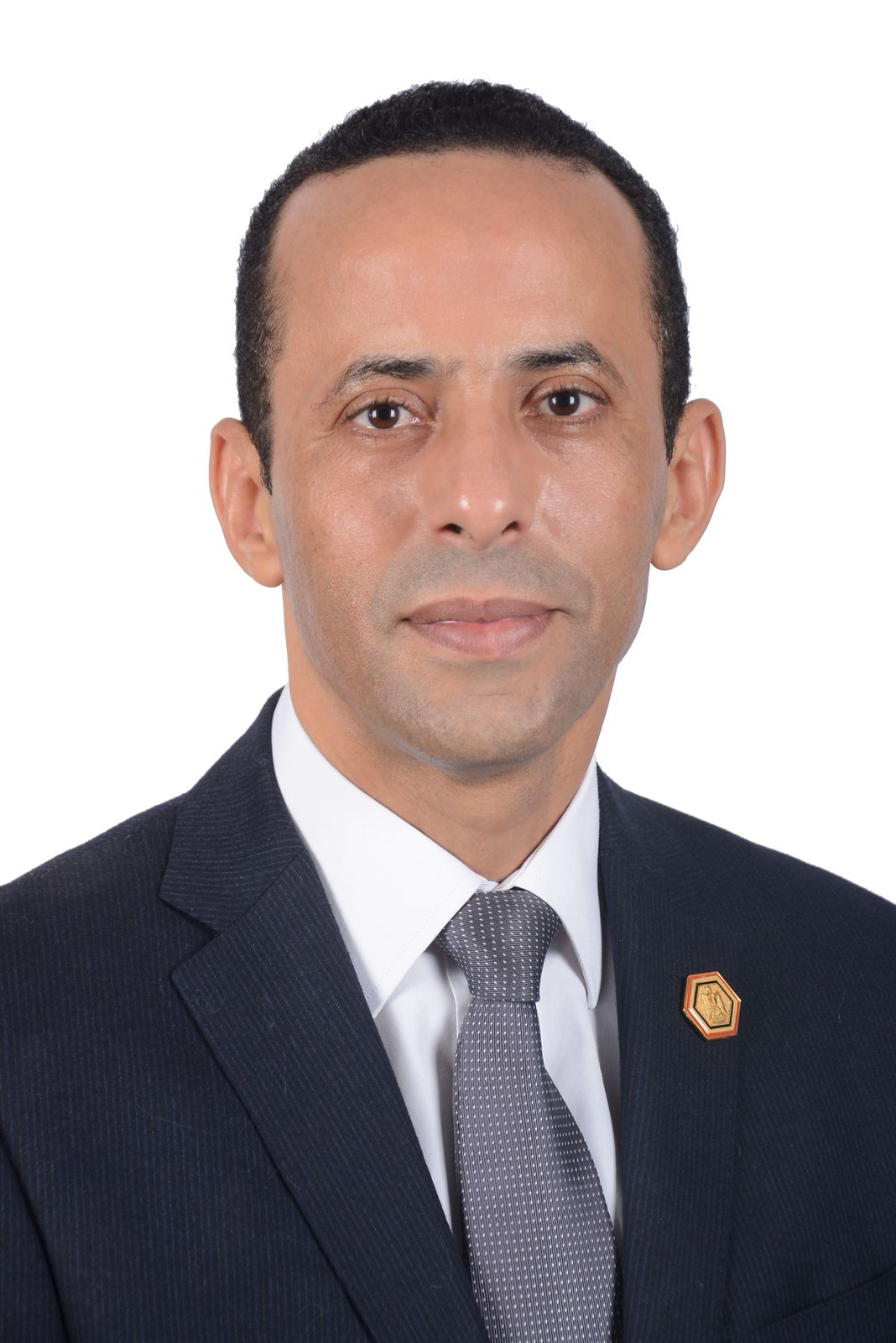

Assistant Secretary-General for Programmes, Common Market for Eastern and Southern Africa (COMESA)
- Incumbent
- Assumed office 8 June 2023
- Preceded by: Kipyego Cheluget (Kenya)
- In office 23 October 2019 – 19 October 2021

Personal details
- Born: 9 September 1972 (age 54) Tokh, Qalyubiyya Governorate, Egypt
- Children: 3
- Education: Helwan University (BCom); University of Warwick; American University in Cairo; NOVA University Lisbon
- Occupation: Diplomat

Mohamed Mansour Kadah (Arabic: محمد منصور قدح; born 9 September 1972) is an Egyptian career diplomat, international civil servant, and scholar of international political economy and business administration. Since August 2023, he has served as assistant secretary-general for programmes of the Common Market for Eastern and Southern Africa (COMESA), the largest regional economic community in Africa. Kadah previously served as Egypt’s ambassador to South Sudan (2019–2021) and deputy assistant foreign minister for African organizations and communities. His public service has involved contributions to regional integration processes, including digital trade under the African Continental Free Trade Area (AfCFTA), climate-resilient industrial policy, and investment cooperation within COMESA member states.

== Early life and education ==
Born in Tokh, Qalyubiyya Governorate in Egypt’s Nile Delta, to MP and businessman Mansour Kadah and Fekrat al-Husseiny, Kadah earned a Bachelor of Commerce in Foreign Trade Management from Helwan University (1995), an LLM in International Economic Law from the University of Warwick (2001), an MA in Economics from the American University in Cairo (2002), and a PhD with distinction in International Relations from NOVA University Lisbon (2012).

== Diplomatic career ==
He completed full diplomatic training at Egypt’s Institute of Diplomatic Studies, interned at the 54th session of the United Nations General Assembly, and attended the mid‑career diplomatic program at the Indian Foreign Service Institute. Kadah joined the Egyptian Ministry of Foreign Affairs in 1998 and served in multiple roles, including postings in Addis Ababa, Lisbon, Sana’a, and Berlin. From 2017 to 2019, he served as deputy director for African organizations and head of the African Union Department during Egypt’s 2019 AU Chairmanship. In 2019, President Abdel Fattah el-Sisi appointed him Ambassador to the Republic of South Sudan. His tenure included work on economic diplomacy, peace-building, development cooperation, public health support, investment promotion, and humanitarian assistance. He concluded his service in South Sudan in October 2021.

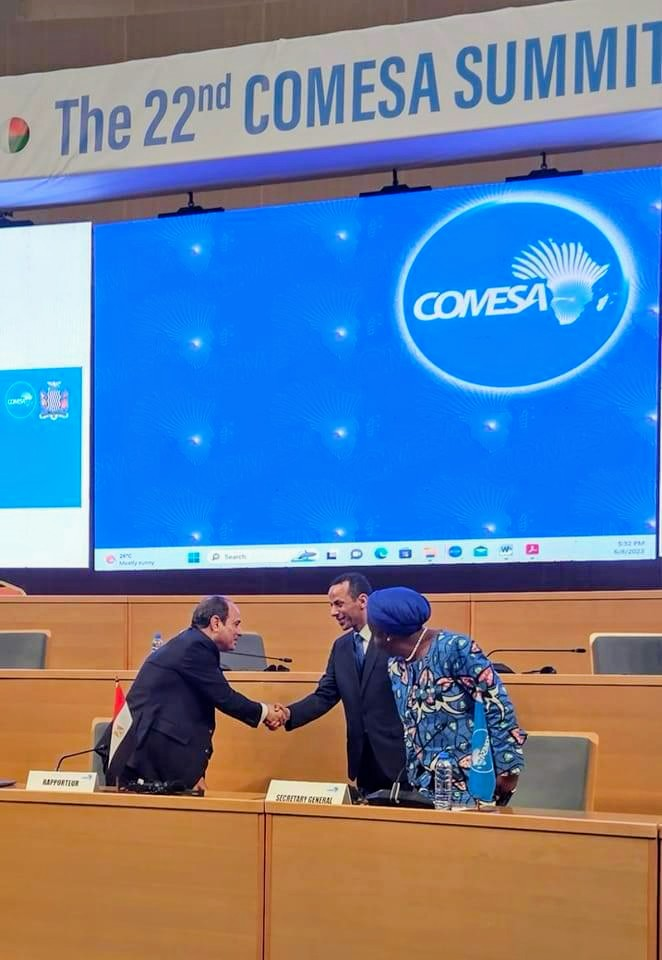
President Abdel Fattah Saeed Hussein Khalil el-Sisi (left) and Mohamed Mansour Kadah (middle) and COMESA secretary general-Chileshe Kapwepwe(centre)during Kadah's swearing on 08 June 2023.

== COMESA tenure ==
At the COMESA Summit in June 2023, Kadah was elected assistant secretary-general for programmes. His portfolio includes the divisions of Trade, Customs and Monetary Affairs; Industry and Agriculture; Infrastructure and Logistics; Gender and Social Affairs; Information and Communication Technology; Governance, Peace and Security; and Statistics. Reports highlight his involvement in COMESA’s Digital Free Trade Area Strategy (2024–2030), the Africa Cloud Ecosystem Strategy, AfCFTA alignment, the COMESA Common Investment Agreement, and the COMESA Investment Forum held in Tunis. He has also been associated with regional trade remedies, women’s economic empowerment strategies, the Zambia–Zimbabwe Common Agro‑Industrial Park, climate‑resilient energy initiatives, and peace and security programming in partnership with ACCORD.

== Academic career ==
Since 2022, Kadah has taught in the Executive Education programme at the American University in Cairo, and he has previously served as a part-time lecturer at NOVA University Lisbon. His scholarly output includes works on Foreign direct investment, intellectual property, global governance, and multilateralism. His publications include contributions to the Economic Research Forum, IPRIS, journal articles, and a 2012 monograph.

== Personal life ==
He is married with three children and divides his time between Cairo and Lusaka.

Diplomatic posts
Preceded by Kipyego Cheluget	List of assistant secretaries-general of the Common Market for Eastern and Southern Africa; 8 June 2023–present	Incumbent
