= List of ambassadors of Zambia to Russia =

Coordinates: 55.782593°N 37.635252°E

Ambassador of Zambia to Russia Embassy of Zambia in Moscow
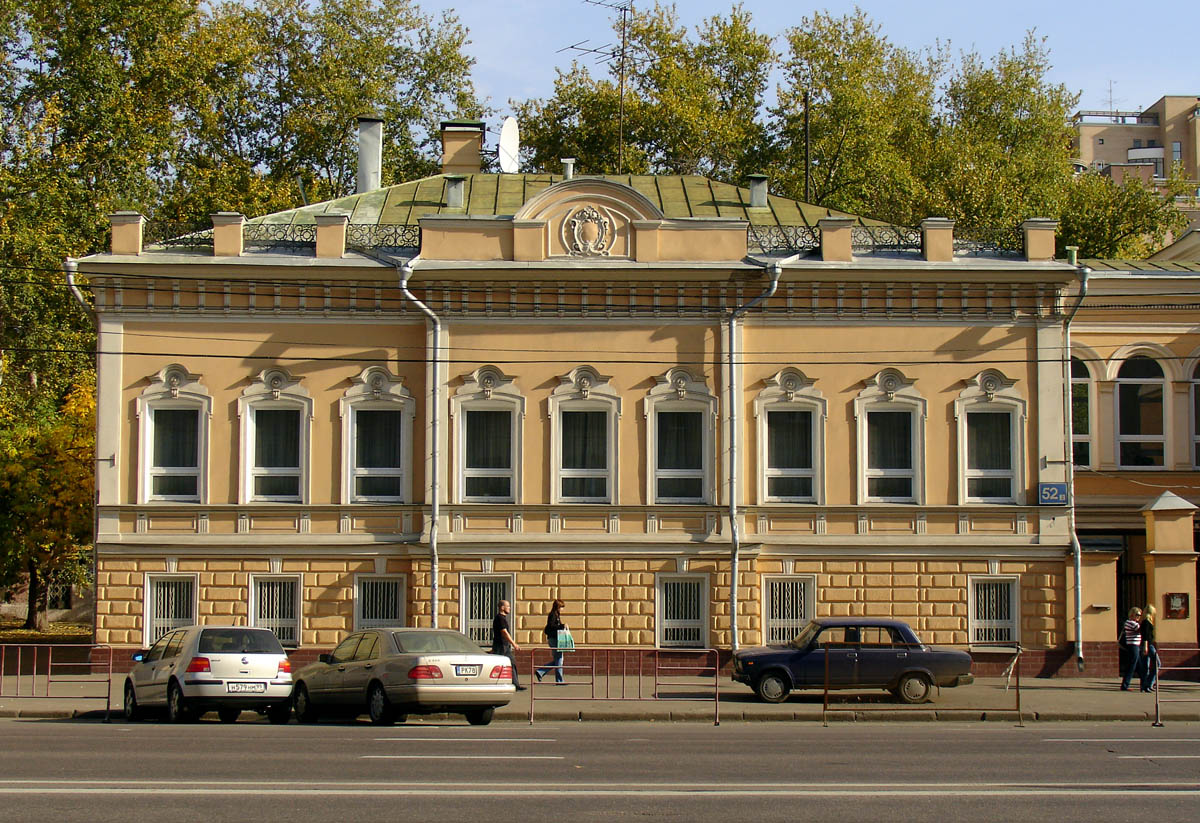
- Incumbent; Patrick Sinyinza since September 15, 2009
- Inaugural holder: Vernon Mwaanga
- Formation: 1965

The Zambian ambassador in Moscow is the official representative of the Government in Lusaka to the Government of Russia.

- Resident in Moscow, he has concurrent accreditation as ambassador of Zambia to Albania, Armenia, Azerbaijan, Belarus, Georgia (country), Kazakhstan, Kyrgyzstan, Moldova, Tajikistan, Turkmenistan, Ukraine and Uzbekistan.

== List of representatives ==
Diplomatic agrément/Diplomatic accreditation	Ambassador	Observations	List of presidents of Zambia	President of Russia	Term end
January 1, 1965	Vernon Mwaanga	Vernon Johnston Mwaanga At twenty-one years of age, one year after Zambia gained independence from British colonial rule in 1964, Mwaanga was appointed Zambian ambassador to Moscow.	Kenneth Kaunda	Leonid Brezhnev	
May 1, 1966	Hosea Josias Soko	Хосеа Джосиасом Соко	Kenneth Kaunda	Leonid Brezhnev	1968
July 1, 1968	Paul J. F. Lusaka		Kenneth Kaunda	Leonid Brezhnev	1972
September 6, 1972	Dunstan Kamana		Kenneth Kaunda	Leonid Brezhnev	1974
1974	Denny Sibajene		Kenneth Kaunda	Leonid Brezhnev	1976
1976	Peter Lesa Kasanda		Kenneth Kaunda	Leonid Brezhnev	1979
April 6, 1979	Siyanga Xavier Qüicksett Shimabale	S. X. Q. Shimabale, Mrs. Jane Shimabale	Kenneth Kaunda	Leonid Brezhnev	
1982	Joshua Simasiku Siyolwe	J. S. Siyolwe	Kenneth Kaunda	Leonid Brezhnev	1984
November 2, 1988	Obino Richard Haambote		Kenneth Kaunda	Mikhail Gorbachev	1994
1996	Nchimunya John Sikaulu		Frederick Chiluba	Boris Yeltsin	
June 19, 2001	Lyson Potipher Tembo		Frederick Chiluba	Vladimir Putin	October 17, 2005
October 5, 2004	Peter Chintala		Levy Mwanawasa	Vladimir Putin	2009
September 15, 2009	Patrick Sinyinza		Rupiah Banda	Dmitry Medvedev	

== See also ==
- List of ambassadors of Russia to Zambia
- Russia–Zambia relations
