= List of ambassadors of Zambia to China =

Coordinates: 39.939567°N 116.459077°E

Ambassador of Zambia to China
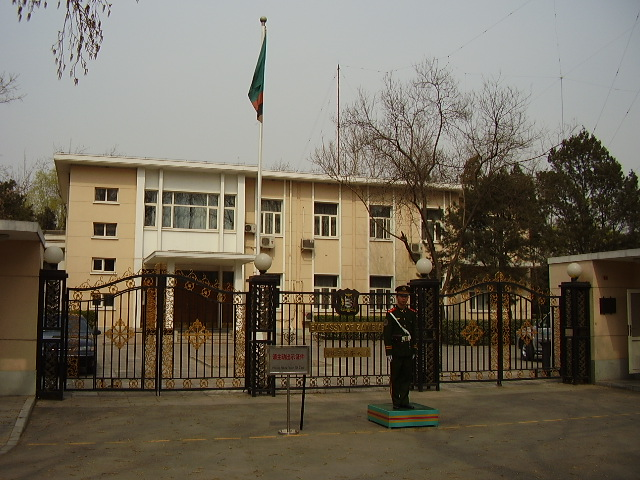
- Incumbent; Palan Mulonda since January 14, 2013
- Inaugural holder: Philemon N'goma
- Formation: 1969

The Zambian ambassador in Beijing is the official representative of the Government in Lusaka to the Government of China.

== List of representatives ==
Diplomatic agrément/Diplomatic accreditation	Ambassador	Observations	List of presidents of Zambia	Premier of the People's Republic of China	Term end
October 29, 1964		The governments in Lusaka and Beijing established diplomatic relations	Kenneth Kaunda	Zhou Enlai	
1969	Philemon N'goma		Kenneth Kaunda	Zhou Enlai	1970
1970	Jonathan Kalunga Chivunga		Kenneth Kaunda	Zhou Enlai	1974
1975	Andreya Sylvester Masiye		Kenneth Kaunda	Zhou Enlai	1977
1978	Willie Robert Mwondela	(*1921)	Kenneth Kaunda	Hua Guofeng	1984
1984	Mainza Chona		Kenneth Kaunda	Zhao Ziyang	1989
August 29, 1989	Peter Lesa Kasanda		Kenneth Kaunda	Li Peng	1994
April 8, 1995	Moses Musonda		Frederick Chiluba	Li Peng	
December 29, 1997	Jacob Mwansa Kabinga		Frederick Chiluba	Li Peng	
June 12, 2000	Mwenya Lwatula		Frederick Chiluba	Zhu Rongji	
November 25, 2003	David Clifford Saviye		Levy Mwanawasa	Wen Jiabao	
May 23, 2012	Gerald K. Peter Nyirenda		Michael Sata	Wen Jiabao	
January 1, 2017	Chisanga Fredrick Kabwe	Chargé d'Affaires	Edgar Lungu	Wen Jiabao	
