= Kebby =

Kebby is an African given name. Notable people with the name include:

- Kebby Maphatsoe, South African politician
- Kebby Musokotwane (1946–1996), Zambian politician
