= CAB International =

UN treaty organization for development

- Founded: 1910; 116 years ago
- Type: Nonprofit, intergovernmental
- Purpose: Agriculture, climate change
- Location: Global
- Region served: Global
- Members: 48
- Revenue: GBP £42.8m (▲16% more than 2022)
- Employees: 500 at >20 sites globally
- Website: cabi.org

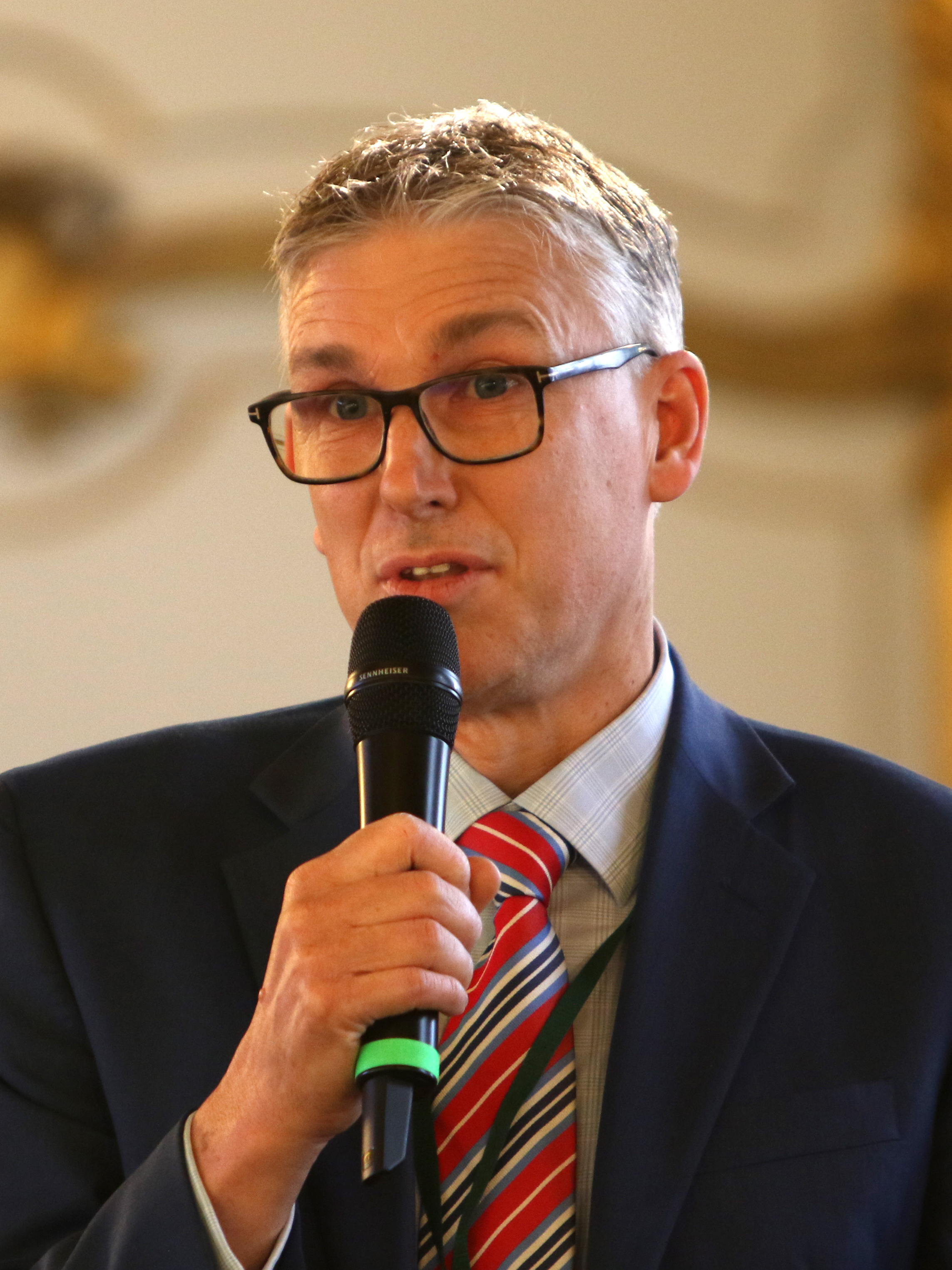
Daniel Elger, CEO of CABI speaking at the Global Food Security Summit in London on 20 November 2023

CABI (legally CAB International, formerly Commonwealth Agricultural Bureaux) is a nonprofit intergovernmental development and information organisation focusing primarily on agricultural and environmental issues in the developing world, and the creation, curation, and dissemination of scientific knowledge.

== Overview ==
CABI is an international not-for-profit organisation. Their work is delivered through teams of CABI scientists and key partners working in over 40 countries across the world. CABI states its mission as "improving people's lives worldwide by solving problems in agriculture and the environment". These problems include loss of crops caused by pests and diseases, invasive weeds and pests that damage farm production and biodiversity, and lack of global access to scientific research.

=== Funding ===
Donors listed in the company's 2023 financial report include the UK's Foreign, Commonwealth and Development Office, the Ministry of Foreign Affairs of the Netherlands, the European Union, Agriculture and Agri-Food Canada, Swiss Agency for Development and Cooperation and United States Agency for International Development. A portion of CABI's revenue is made up of member country contributions.

=== Projects ===
CABI engages in a variety of projects that address agricultural and environmental issues worldwide. Typically these focus on food security, climate change, gender and youth, biodiversity, and increasing the impact of science.

==== Invasive Species ====
CABI hosts a large number of invasive species-related projects that it is currently planning to bring under one banner. Many of these projects don't focus on a particular area, but on specific species. Notable projects include research into invasive plants including Japanese knotweed, giant hogweed and Himalayan balsam.

==== PlantwisePlus ====
PlantwisePlus aims to reach 75 million smallholder farmers in low and lower-middle income countries, providing them with access to the knowledge and skills they need to improve their production practices.

This will be achieved by supporting countries to predict, prevent, and prepare for plant health threats in the face of a changing climate. This ensures that smallholder farmers reduce their crop losses and produce more and safer food through sustainable crop production practices.

Delivered through gender-sensitive and climate-resilient approaches, PlantwisePlus is tackling the challenges facing smallholder production through three impact pathways: Pest Preparedness, Pesticide Risk Reduction, and Farmer Advisory. PlantwisePlus

==== BioProtection Portal ====
CABI BioProtection Portal is a free global resource for biological pest management. It features a searchable directory of nationally registered biocontrol and biopesticide products alongside comprehensive information to help agricultural advisors and growers to source and effectively use sustainable natural products within integrated pest management programmes.

== Microbial services ==
CABI housed a collection of over 28,000 fungus samples from around the world to carry out microbial identification, preservations, patenting, training and consultancy from their offices and labs in Egham, England. In 2009, these were merged with the collection at the Royal Botanic Gardens, Kew. This move was supported by a £250,000 grant from the UK government.

== Notable people ==
Chileshe Kapwepwe who has served as Secretary General for the Common Market for Eastern and Southern Africa since 2018, is currently CABI's Board Chair.

== Publishing ==
The publishing division of CABI helps to fund the scientific research and projects undertaken by the other two divisions. CABI publishes books, abstract databases (such as CAB Direct) and online resources. Subject areas include agriculture, plant sciences, veterinary sciences, environmental science, food, nutrition, and tourism.

CABI's database 'Global Health' is a specialist bibliographic, abstracting and indexing database dedicated to public health research and practice. Publications from over 158 countries in 50 languages are abstracted and all relevant non-English-language papers are translated to give access to research not available through any other database. In 2010, CABI became an official supporting organisation of Healthcare Information For All by 2015 as part of its support to improve availability and use of healthcare information in low-income countries.
