= Elijah Mudenda =

Zambian politician

Elijah Haatuakali Kaiba Mudenda (6 June 1927 – 2 November 2008) was a Zambian politician. He served as the 2nd Prime Minister of Zambia from 27 May 1975 to 20 July 1977.

== Early life and education ==
Mudenda was born in Macha, in the Choma District of Southern Province. He attended primary school at Macha Central and did his upper standards at Sikalongo Boys School. He then attended Munali Secondary School, Makerere University and the University of Fort Hare in South Africa where he earned a master's degree. He later obtained a BSc in agriculture at Peterhouse, University of Cambridge, UK. On returning home, Mudenda worked as a research officer, specializing in plant breeding.

== Political and government positions ==
He entered politics in 1962, and at independence, he was appointed Minister of Agriculture. Three years later, he became Minister of Finance. He was moved to Foreign Minister in 1969, where he also held a number of posts on international committees.

On 27 May 1975, President Kenneth Kaunda named Mudenda as the Prime Minister after Mainza Chona resigned. Mudenda was given the overall responsibility of running all of the ministries concerned with the economy in an attempt to stimulate non-mining sectors. He was removed as Prime Minister on 20 July 1977, and replaced by the same man who held the position two years earlier. He was a UNIP member of the central committee in charge of the party control commission when he retired from politics, after the party lost the 1991 general elections to the Movement for Multi-Party Democracy (MMD) Party.

Mudenda served as patron of the Cuba-Zambia Friendship Association and was conferred the Friendship Medal by Cuba through the Cuban Institute of Friendship with the Peoples in 2005.

== Death ==
Mudenda died at Maina Soko Military Hospital in Lusaka. Following his death, Mudenda was given a state funeral and was buried on 6 November 2008, at his Sun Valley farm, located in the New Kasama area of Lusaka. At the funeral, Kaunda, President Rupiah Banda, and former President Frederick Chiluba were present. Kaunda said on the occasion that Mudenda "had a vision for the development of this country. A vision for the development of Africa. Indeed, a vision for the advancement and prosperity of our beloved continent", and he stated that Mudenda would have a lasting legacy. Also speaking on the occasion, Education Minister Geoffrey Lungwangwa described Mudenda as a "humble but distinguished servant of the people" and said that Zambia was "grateful for his life and service to Zambia, Africa and the world.".

== Prominent political positions ==
- 1964 – Minister of Agriculture
- 1967 – Minister of Finance
- 1968 – Foreign Minister
- 1975 – Prime Minister

Political offices
Preceded by Mainza Chona	Prime Minister of Zambia; 1975–1977	Succeeded by Mainza Chona
