= Mainza Chona =

Zambian politician and diplomat

3rd Vice-President of Zambia
- In office October 1970 – August 1973
- President: Kenneth Kaunda
- Preceded by: Simon Kapwepwe
- Succeeded by: Office abolished

1st Prime Minister of Zambia
- In office 25 August 1973 – 27 May 1975
- Preceded by: Position re-created
- Succeeded by: Elijah Mudenda
- In office 20 July 1977 – 15 June 1978
- Preceded by: Elijah Mudenda
- Succeeded by: Daniel Lisulo

Minister of Home Affairs
- In office 1966–1969
- President: Kenneth Kaunda
- Preceded by: Simon Kapwepwe
- Succeeded by: Lewis Changufu

Zambian Ambassador to the United States
- In office 1969–1970
- President: Kenneth Kaunda
- Preceded by: Rupiah Banda
- Succeeded by: Andrew B. Mutemba

Minister of Legal Affairs and Attorney-General
- In office 1975–1977
- President: Kenneth Kaunda
- Preceded by: Annel Silungwe
- Succeeded by: Daniel Lisulo

Secretary General of UNIP
- In office 1978–1981

Zambian Ambassador to China
- In office 1984–1989

Zambian Ambassador to France
- In office 1989–1992

Personal details
- Born: Sikaye Chingula Namukamba; 21 January 1930 Nampeyo, near Monze, Northern Rhodesia
- Died: 11 December 2001 (aged 71) Milpark Hospital, Johannesburg, South Africa
- Spouse: Yolanta C. Mainza (m. 1953)
- Relatives: Paddy Siyanga Knudsen (granddaughter); Buumba Siyanga (granddaughter); Joanne Nasilele Siyanga (granddaughter); Puncherello Chama (grandson); Monica Siyanga (granddaughter); Patrick Siyanga (grandson); Yolanta Boti (granddaughter); Margaret Chona Maambo (1st daughter) Mona Chona Siyanga (2nd daughter) Elizabeth Chona Muyovwe (3rd daughter) Thomas Chona (4th son) Kaoli Chona (5th daughter twin) Yuka Chona Boti (6th daughter twin) Josephine Chona (7th daughter) Patrick Chona (2nd son): Lulu Haangala (granddaughter)

Mainza Mathias Chona (21 January 1930 – 11 December 2001) was a Zambian politician and founder of UNIP who served as the third vice-president of Zambia from 1970 to 1973 and Prime Minister on two occasions: from 25 August 1973 to 27 May 1975 and from 20 July 1977 to 15 June 1978.

He was Secretary General of the United National Independence Party (UNIP), the ruling party, from 1978 to 1981. This position was the de facto second in command in the hierarchy of Zambian politics during the period of the One Party Participatory State (1973–1991).

He also held various government positions, including Justice Minister (1964–1968), Home Affairs Minister (1968–1969) and Minister of Legal Affairs and Attorney-General (1975–1978). He was Secretary-General of UNIP from 1978 to 1981 and Ambassador to the People's Republic of China from 1984 to 1989. He later served as Ambassador to France until 1992.

== Early life and education background ==
Chona was born Sikaye Chingula Namukamba on 21 January 1930 at Nampeyo, near Monze in the Batoka Province of the British colony of Northern Rhodesia (which later became Southern Province, Zambia). His father was Hameja Chilala (also known as Chief Chona). His mother, Nhandu (Chinyama), was one of his father's five wives.

Chona received his primary education at Chona out-school in Nampeyo (established by the Jesuit mission at his father's request), and at Chikuni (the Jesuit headquarters). It was at Chikuni that Chona converted to Catholicism. He completed his secondary education at Munali Secondary School in Lusaka in 1951 and then worked as an interpreter at the High Court in Livingstone. However, his ambition was to become a lawyer.

In pursuit of his goal, Chona secured a scholarship that took him to London in 1955, where he studied at Gray's Inn. He was called to the bar in 1958. While in England, he met other African nationalists, including Harry Nkumbula and Kenneth Kaunda. He also made contact with London-based White supporters of the nationalist cause, such as Simon Zukas and Doris Lessing. This was also when he adopted the name Mathias Mainza Chona by deed poll.

== Independence struggle ==
Chona returned to Northern Rhodesia in December 1958. During his absence from Northern Rhodesia, politics had moved forward on several fronts. The White-dominated Central African Federation (CAF) had been established on 1 August 1953, in spite of feeble opposition from the Black population through the African National Congress (ANC), led by Nkumbula and Kaunda. The two leaders drifted apart as Nkumbula became increasingly influenced by White liberals and was seen as being willing to compromise on the issue of Black majority rule. Eventually Kaunda broke from the ANC in October 1958 and formed the Zambia African National Congress (ZANC), with Nkumbula remaining as leader of the ANC. Chona had been a member of ANC while in London and he had not made a choice between the two factions. Due to ZANC's militancy and its unwillingness to compromise on the issue of "independence now", Kaunda and other leaders of the new party were detained by the CAF authorities, and ZANC was banned in March 1959. Chona decided to take active part in the operations of the still-legal ANC, but his challenge to Nkumbula's cautious leadership of the party resulted in a further split.

Chona and other nationalists broke away from the ANC and, in October 1959, Chona became the first president of the United National Independence Party (UNIP), the successor to ZANC. However, he did not see himself as the party's main founder and he stepped down when Kaunda was released from prison in January 1960. As Kaunda's loyal lieutenant, Chona was elected deputy president of UNIP, but he had to leave Northern Rhodesia to avoid a charge of sedition brought by the increasingly rattled CAF authorities. He remained in London as UNIP's overseas representative for more than a year. He also served as a UNIP delegate to the Federal Review Conference in London in December 1960 and returned home in February 1961.

In June 1961, Chona was elected National Secretary of UNIP and he remained in that post for eight years. He was instrumental in securing the short-lived coalition between UNIP and the ANC in January 1963. In January 1964, Kaunda formed Northern Rhodesia's first Black cabinet, and gave Chona the post of Minister of Justice in UNIP's pre-independence government.

== After independence ==
At independence in October 1964, Kaunda gave Chona the post of Minister of Home Affairs. Between 1966 and 1969, Chona held no less than five different ministerial appointments, including minister without portfolio. He was sent to the United States as ambassador in 1969. In November 1970, he was returned to Zambia and appointed the country's Vice-President.

Chona's lasting contribution to Zambia's constitutional development was the famous Chona Commission, which was set up under his chairmanship in February 1972 to make recommendations for the constitution of a 'one-party participatory democracy' (i.e. a one-party state). The Commission's terms of reference did not permit it to discuss the pros and cons of Kaunda's decision. The sole surviving opposition party, the ANC, boycotted the Commission and unsuccessfully challenged the constitutional change in the courts. The Chona report was based on four months of public hearings and was submitted in October 1972. It was widely regarded as a 'liberal' document.

== The Second Republic ==
Although the Second Republic was inaugurated in December 1972, the National Assembly did not approve the new constitution until August 1973. The document was modelled on the Soviet Union's one-party system. The constitution asserted the supremacy of the single party (UNIP), but did not include the Commission's more liberal recommendations, such as placing limits on detention without trial, restricting the President to serve only two five-year terms, and sharing the President's executive powers with a Prime Minister. The liberal recommendations would also have required electoral competition for the post of President, and prevented him from vetoing parliamentary candidates. Although many of the report's recommendations were ignored, it had a lasting influence: it was cited during the debate on the return to multi-party democracy in 1990–91, and again during the campaign to stop President Frederick Chiluba running for a third term in 2001.

From 1973 to 1975, Chona was given the position of Prime Minister, a new post that was clearly subordinate to that of President. He served for a second time from 1977 to 1978, after a spell as Minister of Legal Affairs and Attorney-General. Kaunda appointed Chona as Secretary-General of UNIP in 1978 and he remained in that position, which ranked second to that of President, until February 1981. Up to the end of the UNIP era Chona and Kaunda remained close associates.

== "Into the Cold" of exile ==
After he was removed from UNIP's Central Committee, Chona refused an appointment as ambassador to China and returned to private legal practice. In 1984, finally, he agreed to go to Beijing and spent five years there in a period of exile. He wanted to return to Zambia at the end of his term in China, but Kaunda transferred him to Paris, where he served as ambassador for a further three years, from 1989 to 1992. When he was eventually allowed to return to Zambia, he again entered private legal practice. He was associated, as a lawyer, with the Oasis Forum which successfully opposed Chiluba's attempt to run for a third term as president.

Chona was widely respected in Zambia as a good administrator and as Kaunda's loyal lieutenant. He contributed immensely to the organization of UNIP and to Zambia's struggle for independence. Although his role in the establishment of a one-party state in Zambia was controversial, he shrewdly produced a report on the subject that, in some respects, stood the test of time. He seemed to lack personal ambition and did not enrich himself through political office. His deep interest in Tonga culture, language and history led him to make a small contribution to Tonga literature: his Chitonga novel, Kabuca Uleta Tunji, was awarded the Margaret Wrong medal in 1956. His daughter Elizabeth Muyovwe was a Justice of the Supreme Court of Zambia from 2010 to 2021. His brother Mark Chona also played a prominent part in Zambia's political and public life.

While undergoing dialysis at Milpark Hospital in Johannesburg, South Africa, Mainza Chona died on 11 December 2001. He was buried on 16 December in Monze, Zambia.

Political offices
Preceded by Simon Kapwepwe	Vice-President of Zambia; 1970–1973	Succeeded by Office abolished
Preceded by (–)	Prime Minister of Zambia; 1973–1975	Succeeded by Elijah Mudenda
Preceded by Elijah Mudenda	Prime Minister of Zambia; 1977–1978	Succeeded by Daniel Lisulo
