= Elizabeth Muyovwe =

Zambian Supreme Court Justice (1956–2021)

Her Excellency Elizabeth Muyovwe

Judge of the Supreme Court of Zambia

Personal details
- Born: 21 November 1956 London
- Died: 31 January 2021 (aged 64) Maina Soko Military Hospital, Lusaka, Zambia
- Education: University of Zambia (Bachelor of Laws)

Elizabeth Nkombo Chona Muyovwe (21 November 1956 – 31 January 2021), commonly known as Elizabeth Muyovwe, was a Zambian Supreme Court Justice.

== Background and education ==
She was born in 1956. Her father is the late Mainza Chona (1930 to 2001), one-time Vice President of Zambia (1970 to 1973) and Zambia's ambassador to China (1984 to 1989). In 1979, she graduated from the University of Zambia, School of Law, with a Bachelor of Laws. She was admitted to Zambia Bar in 1981.

== Work history in Zambia ==
For a period of six years, from 1981 until 1987, she worked for the Zambian Ministry of Legal Affairs, as a State Attorney and as an Assistant Senior Legal Aid Counsel. She then was hired by Lima Bank Limited, as a Senior Legal Officer, serving there from 1988 until 1991. She concurrently served as a part-time research associate for "Women and Law in Southern Africa", between 1989 and 1993. She was the Vice Chairperson of the Lands Tribunal from 1996 until 1998, and established and served as the first Director of the LAZ National Legal Aid Clinic for Women between 1991 and 1998.

She lectured, on a part-time basis at the Zambia Institute of Advanced Legal Education (ZIALE), from 1999 until 2003, lecturing in the area of domestic relations. In 1998, she was appointed a Judge of the High Court of Zambia, responsible for the High Court in Livingstone, Zambia. In 2010, president Rupiah Banda appointed her to the Supreme Court and her appointment was ratified by parliament on 30 October 2010.

== Work history at the United Nations ==
In 2002, Justice Elizabeth Muyovwe was appointed as an Alternate Judge of the United Nations Special Court for Sierra Leone.

== Death ==
Justice Elizabeth Muyovwe died of COVID-19 during the COVID-19 pandemic in Zambia on 31 January 2021.

== See also ==
- Government of Zambia
- Judiciary of Zambia
- International Criminal Court
- Florence Mumba
