= Palan Mulonda =

Zambian judge

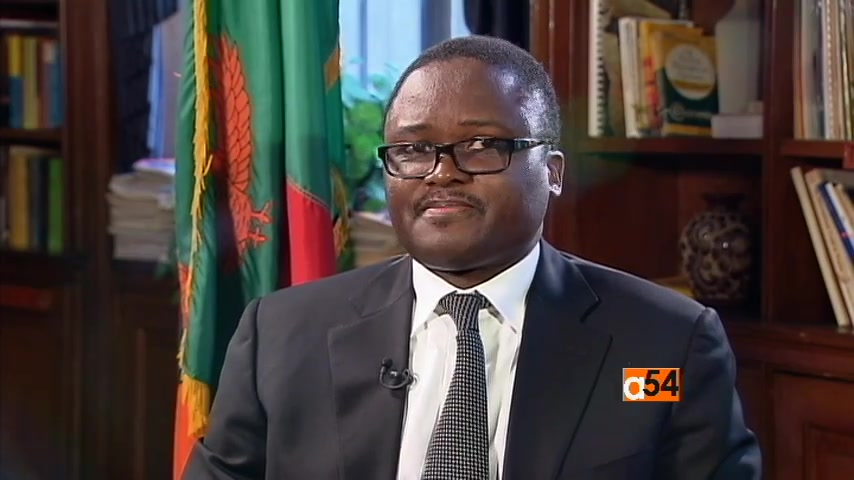

Zambian Ambassador to the United States of America
- In office January 2013 – January 2016
- President: Michael Sata
- Preceded by: Shelia Z. Siwela
- Succeeded by: Ngosa Simbyakula

Personal details
- Born: Palan Mulonda; 1972 (age 53–54)
- Education: University of Zambia, University of Lund

Palan Mulonda is a Zambian Judge of the Constitutional Court, diplomat and human rights advocate. He is a former ambassador of Zambia to the United States a former state advocate and international law adviser to the attorney-general of Zambia. He has also acted as legal adviser to various government international negotiations in transactions concerning the energy, defense, telecommunications, commerce and trade, agriculture and mining sectors. He now serves on the highest judicial tribunal as one of seven justices of the Constitutional Court.
