= Permanent Representative of Zambia to the United Nations =

Coordinates: 40.756637°N 73.968396°W

Permanent Representative of Zambia to the Headquarters of the United Nations
- Incumbent; Chola Milambo since 17 May 2022
- Inaugural holder: Fwanyanga Mulikita
- Formation: 14 January 1965

The Zambian Permanent Representative in New York City is the official representative of the Government in Lusaka next the Headquarters of the United Nations.

== List of representatives ==
Diplomatic accreditation	Permanent Representative	President	UN Secretary-General	Term end
14 January 1965	Fwanyanga Mulikita	Kenneth Kaunda	U Thant	1 January 1966
21 July 1966	Joseph Ben Mwemba	Kenneth Kaunda	U Thant	10 May 1968
24 May 1968	Vernon Mwaanga	Kenneth Kaunda	U Thant	14 February 1972
18 May 1972	Paul J. F. Lusaka	Kenneth Kaunda	Kurt Waldheim	14 January 1974
16 August 1974	Rupiah Banda	Kenneth Kaunda	Kurt Waldheim	15 July 1975
22 August 1975	Dunstan Kamana	Kenneth Kaunda	Kurt Waldheim	5 June 1977
22 May 1978	Gwendoline Konie	Kenneth Kaunda	Kurt Waldheim	19 January 1979
22 January 1979	Paul J. F. Lusaka	Kenneth Kaunda	Kurt Waldheim	6 August 1986
16 June 1986	Peter Dingiswayo Zuze	Kenneth Kaunda	Javier Pérez de Cuéllar	10 April 1991
16 July 1991	Hannaniah B.M. Lungu	Frederick Chiluba	Javier Pérez de Cuéllar	15 January 1992
23 June 1992	Otema Sy Musuka	Frederick Chiluba	Boutros Boutros-Ghali	11 October 1994
14 November 1994	Peter Lesa Kasanda	Frederick Chiluba	Boutros Boutros-Ghali	19 April 2000
22 September 2000	Mwelwa Chambika Musambachime	Frederick Chiluba	Kofi Annan	21 March 2005
13 May 2005	Tens Chisola Kapoma	Levy Mwanawasa	Kofi Annan	27 May 2007
5 June 2007	Lazarous Kapambwe	Levy Mwanawasa	Ban Ki-moon	15 January 2012
15 January 2012	Christine Kalamwina	Michael Sata	Ban Ki-moon	?
28 January 2020	Ngosa Simbyakula	Edgar Lungu	António Guterres	24 August 2021
17 May 2022	Chola Milambo	Hakainde Hichilema	António Guterres	
