= Prime Minister of Zambia =

Head of government

Prime Minister of the Republic of Zambia
- Public Seal of Zambia
- Longest serving Nalumino Mundia; 18 February 1981 – 24 April 1985
- Type: Head of government
- Status: Abolished
- Appointer: President of Zambia
- Precursor: Prime Minister of the Federation of Rhodesia and Nyasaland
- Formation: 25 August 1973
- First holder: Mainza Chona
- Final holder: Malimba Masheke
- Abolished: 31 August 1991

The prime minister of Zambia was the head of government of Zambia. From 1973 to 1975, Mainza Chona was the first person to hold the position following independence from the United Kingdom (Kenneth Kaunda was the only prime minister of Northern Rhodesia in 1964, before it became independent as Zambia).

The position of the prime minister of Zambia was abolished in 1991, in the last months of Kaunda's presidential term. Since then, the President of Zambia serves as both the head of state and the head of government.

== History ==
=== Northern Rhodesia ===
When the country was founded as the British colony of Northern Rhodesia separate from British South Africa Company rule in the Rhodesias, the elected Legislative Council was created. At the time, the office of prime minister did not exist, with all executive power being vested in the governor of Northern Rhodesia. However, the leader of the largest elected party on the council was considered as the "unofficial" prime minister. When Northern Rhodesia united with Southern Rhodesia and Nyasaland to form the Federation of Rhodesia and Nyasaland, the office of prime minister of the Federation of Rhodesia and Nyasaland was created, with Northern Rhodesia's Roy Welensky becoming the second and final holder of the office. Following the breakup of the federation due to the withdrawal of Northern Rhodesia, the office of prime minister was created for the colony. The first and only prime minister of Northern Rhodesia was the United National Independence Party's (UNIP) Kenneth Kaunda after winning the 1964 general election ahead of independence.

=== Zambia ===
Upon independence and the renaming of the country as Zambia, Kaunda became the new president of Zambia after being elected unopposed. The office of prime minister was abolished accordingly. In 1973, following an amendment to the Constitution of Zambia, the office of prime minister was re-established as the titular head of the government but the holder would be subordinate to the Secretary-General of UNIP in governing Zambia. This was because the Central Committee of UNIP had precedence over the Parliament of Zambia under the Constitution. President Kaunda appointed his former vice-president, Mainza Chona, as prime minister. In 1975, Chona resigned and was replaced by Elijah Mudenda. In 1977, Chona became prime minister again for a year before the role was taken over by Daniel Lisulo. Kebby Musokotwane took the role over from Nalumino Mundia in 1985, becoming the youngest prime minister and also the first that was not a member of UNIP's Central Committee. He was removed in 1989 and given an overseas diplomatic post due to President Kaunda believing he was aiming to become the next president.

In 1991, the office was abolished again following a new constitution being created to allow for multi-party democratic elections following UNIP negotiations with the Movement for Multi-Party Democracy (MMD). The powers the prime minister had were subsumed back into the office of president. The constitution allowed for the final prime minister, Malimba Masheke, to remain in office until the 1991 Zambian general election. According to Masheke, at the time of abolition the prime minister was being paid less than his private secretary.

== List of officeholders ==
Political parties

United National Independence Party (UNIP)

=== Northern Rhodesia (1964–1964) ===
No.	Portrait	Name (Birth–Death)	Term of office			Political party	Elected	Cabinet(s)	Governor	Monarch	Ref.
No.	Portrait	Name (Birth–Death)	Took office	Left office	Time in office	Political party	Elected	Cabinet(s)	Governor	Monarch	Ref.
1		Kenneth Kaunda (1924–2021)	22 January 1964	24 October 1964	276 days	UNIP	1964		Evelyn Hone	Elizabeth II	

=== Republic of Zambia (1964–present) ===
No.	Portrait	Name (Birth–Death)	Term of office			Political party	Elected	Cabinet(s)	President(s)	Ref.
No.	Portrait	Name (Birth–Death)	Took office	Left office	Time in office	Political party	Elected	Cabinet(s)	President(s)	Ref.
Post abolished (24 October 1964 – 25 August 1973)
1		Mainza Chona (1930–2001)	25 August 1973	27 May 1975	1 year, 275 days	UNIP	—	Chona I	Kenneth Kaunda	
1		Mainza Chona (1930–2001)	25 August 1973	27 May 1975	1 year, 275 days	UNIP	1973	Chona I	Kenneth Kaunda	
2		Elijah Mudenda (1927–2008)	27 May 1975	20 July 1977	2 years, 54 days	UNIP	—	Mudenda	Kenneth Kaunda	
(1)		Mainza Chona (1930–2001)	20 July 1977	15 June 1978	330 days	UNIP	—	Chona II	Kenneth Kaunda	
3		Daniel Lisulo (1930–2000)	15 June 1978	18 February 1981	2 years, 248 days	UNIP	—	Lisulo	Kenneth Kaunda	
3		Daniel Lisulo (1930–2000)	15 June 1978	18 February 1981	2 years, 248 days	UNIP	1978	Lisulo	Kenneth Kaunda	
4		Nalumino Mundia (1927–1988)	18 February 1981	24 April 1985	4 years, 65 days	UNIP	—	Mundia	Kenneth Kaunda	
4		Nalumino Mundia (1927–1988)	18 February 1981	24 April 1985	4 years, 65 days	UNIP	1983	Mundia	Kenneth Kaunda	
5		Kebby Musokotwane (1946–1996)	24 April 1985	15 March 1989	3 years, 325 days	UNIP	—	Musokotwane	Kenneth Kaunda	
5		Kebby Musokotwane (1946–1996)	24 April 1985	15 March 1989	3 years, 325 days	UNIP	1988	Musokotwane	Kenneth Kaunda	
6		Malimba Masheke (born 1941)	15 March 1989	31 August 1991	2 years, 169 days	UNIP	—	Masheke	Kenneth Kaunda	
Post abolished (31 August 1991 – present)

== See also ==
- Governor of Northern Rhodesia
- President of Zambia
- Vice President of Zambia
- Lists of office-holders
