= Ngosa Simbyakula =

Zambian diplomat

Permanent Representative of Zambia
- In office January 2020 – August 2021
- President: Edgar Lungu
- Preceded by: Lazarous Kapambwe

16th Ambassador to the United States of America
- In office November 2017 – January 2020
- President: Edgar Lungu
- Preceded by: Palan Mulonda
- Succeeded by: Lazarous Kapambwe

Minister of Justice
- In office 2015–2016
- President: Edgar Lungu
- Preceded by: Edgar Lungu
- Succeeded by: Given Lubinda

Personal details
- Born: Ngosa Simbyakula; 13 May 1954 (age 72) Nalube, Monze
- Spouse: Margaret Simbyakula (m. 1983; div. 2015)
- Children: 5
- Education: University of Zambia, University of Wisconsin-Madison
- Profession: Lawyer

Robert Ngosa Simbyakula (born 13 May 1954) is a Zambian diplomat, the current and 17th Permanent Representative of the Republic of Zambia to the United Nations and a former ambassador to the United States of America in Washington DC, he succeeded Palan Mulonda, who served starting in 2013.

== Life and career ==
Ngosa was born in the village of Nalube in Monze and he grew up in Ndola. Ngosa is a Master's degree holder in Law obtained from the University of Zambia. For his LL.M., he wrote a thesis entitled The Preferential Trade Area for Eastern and Southern African states: A Legal perspective. From 1981 to 1998 he taught law at the University of Zambia and he served as dean of the Law School from 1993 to 1998. From 1996 to 1997 he was an external examiner at the University of Dar-es-Salaam in Tanzania.

=== Political career ===
In September 1998 political career started when he was appointed permanent secretary for the Copperbelt Province by President Frederick Chiluba and the following year he was moved to the Ministry of Foreign Affairs. When President Levy Mwanawasa came into power in 2002 he appointed Ngosa as permanent secretary at the Ministry of Justice. In September 2011, he was appointed deputy Minister of Justice and cabinet Minister for Home Affairs by Michael Sata in December 2013. When Edgar Lungu was elected in 2015 named him Minister of Justice, a position he held until 2016. As minister of Justice he played a major role in enacting a major revision of Zambia's constitution, which was signed into law in January 2016. In March 2015 he served as acting president when Lungu was in Pretoria, South Africa, for treatment.
