= Daniel Lisulo =

Zambian politician (1930–2000)

Daniel Muchiwa Lisulo (6 December 1930 – 21 August 2000) was the 3rd Prime Minister of Zambia from June 1978 until February 1981.

== Biography ==
Born in Mongu, Zambia. He graduated from Loyola College, Chennai (then Madras), Tamil Nadu, India. Lisulo married Mary Mambo in 1967; she died in 1976, leaving Lisulo with two daughters. Lisulo served as the director of the Bank of Zambia from 1964 to 1977 before becoming prime minister. He was a member of Parliament from 1977 to 1983, after which, he went into private law practice. He later joined the National Party, and was the party's interim president at the time of his death.

He died on 21 August 2000, in the Sun Hill Hospital in Johannesburg, South Africa.

| Preceded by Mainza Chona | Prime Minister of Zambia; 1978–1981 | Succeeded by Nalumino Mundia |
