= United Party (Zambia) =

The United Party was a political party in Zambia.

== History ==
The party was established in mid-1966 by two Lozi-speaking MPs, one from the United National Independence Party (Dickson Chikulo) and one from the Zambian African National Congress (Mufaya Mumbuna). It was originally named the United Front before becoming the United Party. The founders were later joined by other prominent political figures, including former minister Nalumino Mundia, who became its president. The defections resulted in by-elections being called, with only Chikulo standing for re-election (and losing).

The party grew rapidly, but was banned in August 1968 after the government blamed it for violence. It subsequently merged into the ZANC.
