= Lulu Haangala =

Zambian TV personality (born 1984)

Lulu Haangala Wood
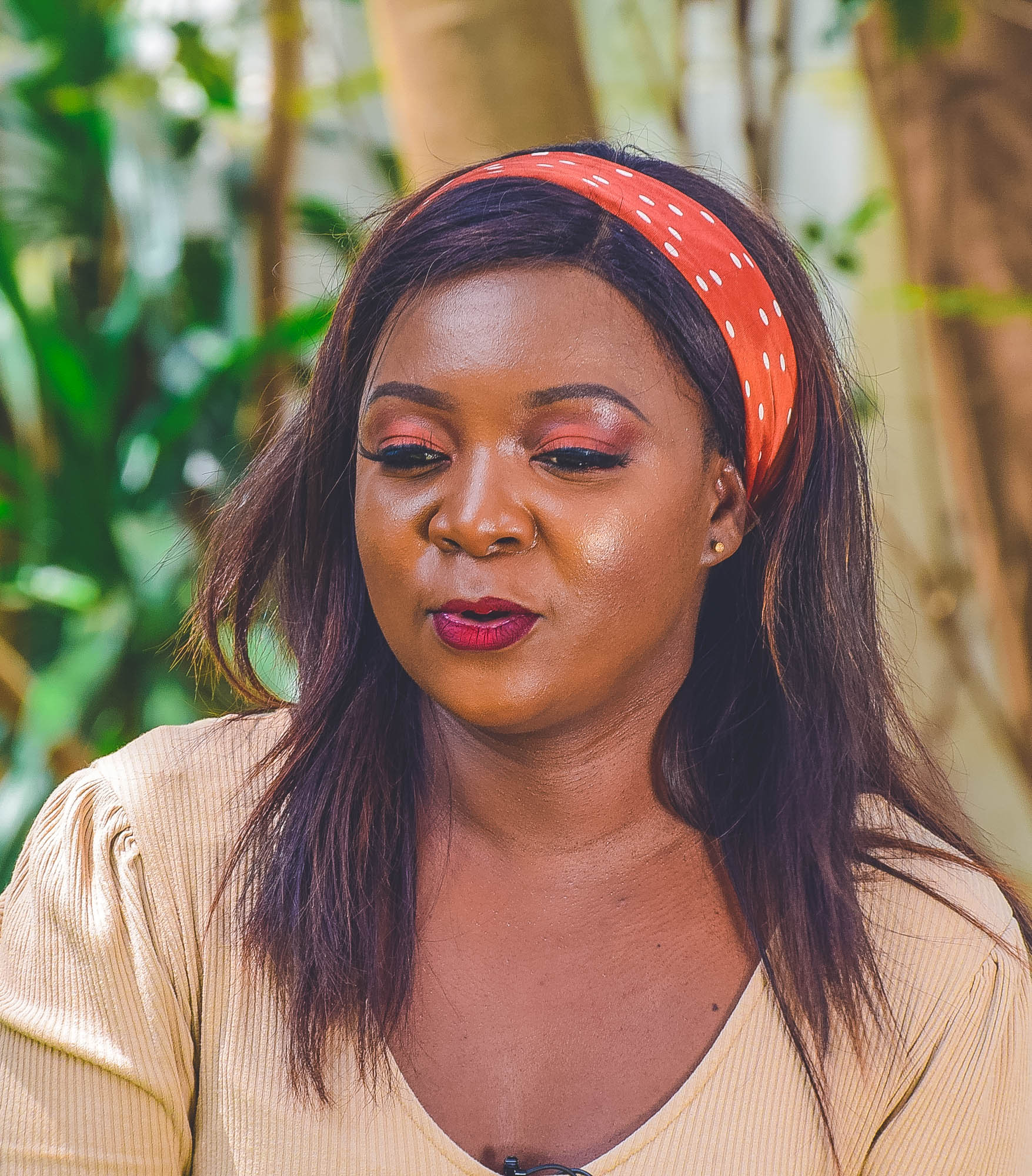
- Lulu in 2021.
- Born: Luyando Haangala; 12 March 1984 (age 42); Lusaka, Zambia
- Other name: Lulu
- Education: Helderburg College; Zambia Institute of Diplomacy
- Occupations: Master of Ceremony; Singer; Actress; Businesswoman; Television Presenter; Media Consultant; Media Entrepreneur; Model
- Years active: 2005–present
- Notable credits: Muvi TV; Africa unite TV; Lunchtime Show Rock Fm
- Relatives: Mainza Chona (grandfather)
- Website: ww.woodkitchenz.com

Lulu Haangala (born 12 March 1984), also known by her married name Luyando Haangala Wood is a Zambian media and communications consultant, TV personality, local government-certified Master of Ceremonies and is also US Embassy Zambia Youth Ambassador, Pizza Hut Zambia and Samsung Zambia Brand Ambassador and the founder of #WeKeepMoving Foundation and in December 2014 Lulu became partners with Dagon Holding Media. Lulu has also been featured in the 2016 May issue of a South African Magazine Mamas & Papas as the cover story.

== Early life ==
Lulu was born Luyando Haangala in 1984 the first born daughter in a family of four. Lulu did two years of her primary education in Zambia the rest of it, including secondary education, was done in Zimbabwe. She was educated at Baraton University in Kenya where she did her first year of university. This, however, did not work well and she instead relocated to Cape Town, South Africa, where she studied for 4 years and got her B.A. in communications and a Minor in Business degree in 2005. She also got a certificate in Diplomatic Practice and Protocol through the Zambian Institute of Diplomacy and International Studies in 2008.

== Career ==
Straight out of university she worked on and hosted a number TV shows and radio programs for such corporations as ZNBC, Muvi TV and ROCK FM. Lulu's time at Citigroup as an account manager expanded her corporate and media network and sparked her interest in social corporate responsibility.

=== Early career ===
Lulu's career first started at the age of four, singing with her father in different churches around Zambia, Botswana and different towns in Zimbabwe. Lulu has ministered on stage through music and had the privilege of being invited to sing for Zambia's first republican President Dr. Kenneth Kaunda at the age of 6. Lulu's first real job was being a maid for a white missionaries at Mwami Hospital in Chipata. She was then promoted to work in the A.D.R.A (Adventist disaster Relief Agency) office at the same hospital through her hard work she got sponsored for her first year of high school. Lulu also tried a number of income generating projects whilst at school. She ran a hair Salon in her university room, worked as a student librarian, student English tutor and was also a production assistant for the Hope Channel Zambia.

=== Professional career ===
Lulu started her career at MuviTV, where she quickly rose to hosting a multitude of shows including The Big Win Games. Lulu is a household name and celebrated personality because of her television presentations on the international Hope Channel, Muvi TV and ZNBC and for her radio interviews on Radio Phoenix, Hot FM, QFM, Hone Radio and Zambezi FM in Livingstone, Zambia.

In the final months of 2014 she was shortlisted for the African Social Media Personality of the year awards, making the final three.

In 2019, Lulu joined the digital revolution by co-founding a digital platform called Afrishop, an e-commerce platform that offered African users an easy shopping solution for goods directly from China.

She has also co-founded The Wood Kitchen with her husband, showcasing her life and experiences as a home-cook using digital media such as Facebook, Instagram and YouTube.

=== Community service ===
In 2008, she started the #WeKeepMoving foundation inspiring youth to build meaningful lives and careers. Her commitment to this cause caught the attention of the US Embassy, culminating to her selection for the Mandela Washington Fellowship, which sent her to the White House to meet US President Barack Obama and 40 other global leaders.

In 2015 she has also been a moderator at the Global Magna Carter Forum in Washington, where she spoke on Gender equality, meeting Prince Charles and thought leaders on global issues.

==== We Keep Moving ====
The #WeKeepMovingZM Initiative is CSR arm of the Wood Kitchen Zambia LTD and the Lulu Wood brand which has grown to become a source of inspiration for many women and men alike. It was started as a grassroots based organization whose primary interest was helping those in final years of school identify, create, and manifest a set of achievable goals which help them see beyond their present constraints and into their future.

It has since evolved and expanded into an initiative that also aids young professionals and business women to achieve meet their aspirational desires for a better future, however, they may be envisioned. In 2022, the We Keep Moving foundation hosted the Women in Family Business event in support of women entrepreneurs with African family firms, as well the Creatives connect with Zambian American-based stylist Fiskani Kaira. The initiative is the long-term culmination of Lulu Haangala-Wood's deeply held need to help the next and current generation of Zambians live up to their full potential.

== Personal life ==
Lulu is married to William Lubinda Wood.

== Awards and nominations ==
- Nominated for Social Media Awards Africa 2014- Personality of the Year.
- Won Rising Star Zambian Woman of The Year Award 2016
