= Russia–Zambia relations =

- Russia: Zambia

Russia–Zambia relations (Russian: Российско-замбийские отношения) are the bilateral relations between Russia and Zambia.

== Background ==
=== Soviet-era relations ===
==== Diplomatic ties ====
When Northern Rhodesia gained independence from the United Kingdom as Zambia on 24 October 1964, the Soviet Union sent the government of Kenneth Kaunda a telegram recognising Zambian independence, and offered to establish diplomatic relations with the new state. On 30 October 1964, the two countries exchanged notes, establishing diplomatic relations between the two.

==== Political ties ====
Political relations between the Soviet Union and Zambia were challenged by Chinese presence in Zambia, and the cordial attitude of the Kaunda government towards the West, however, Kaunda visited the Soviet Union on state visits in 1974 and 1987.

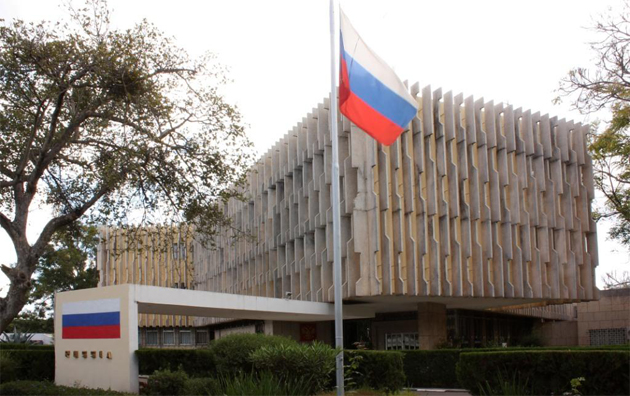
The Soviet embassy in Lusaka (now the Russian embassy) was the largest embassy in Southern Africa.

Relations between the two countries soured in 1976, when Kaunda said on the Soviet and Cuban presence in Angola, "(t)hey drove colonialism and fascism out the front door, only to let a plundering tiger and its cubs in the back door." Soviet support for the Zimbabwe African People's Union, which operated primarily out of Zambia, helped to stop relations from detiorating further, and ties became warmer after Abel Muzorewa, the Prime Minister of Zimbabwe Rhodesia launched airstrikes inside Zambia in 1979. After the strikes, Zambia unsuccessfully sought Western military aid, which saw Zambia turning to East Germany for military aid.

In 1981, the Communist Party of the Soviet Union and the United National Independence Party established ties. Several Soviet delegations visited Lusaka with a view to turn UNIP into a Marxist-Leninist party, and UNIP officials made reciprocal visits to Moscow. The African National Congress moved its headquarters to Lusaka in 1984, and it was in Lusaka that the ANC devised strategy, with the covert assistance of Soviet military and intelligence personnel. In aid of this goal, the Soviet embassy in Lusaka was the largest in Southern Africa, and was staffed by 129 officials, including "approximately 25 KGB and GRU officials with diplomatic cover, and another 50 without".

==== Military ties ====
Between 1979 and 1983, the Soviet Union exported US$180 million in arms to Zambia, comprising seventy percent of Zambia's arms imports. Imports included MiG-21 fighter aircraft, tanks, armoured personnel carriers, S-125 surface-to-air missiles and radar equipment. To train Zambian Defence Force personnel to use and maintain the equipment, the Soviets had some 500 military personnel based in Zambia.

== Russian Federation relations ==
=== Diplomatic ties ===
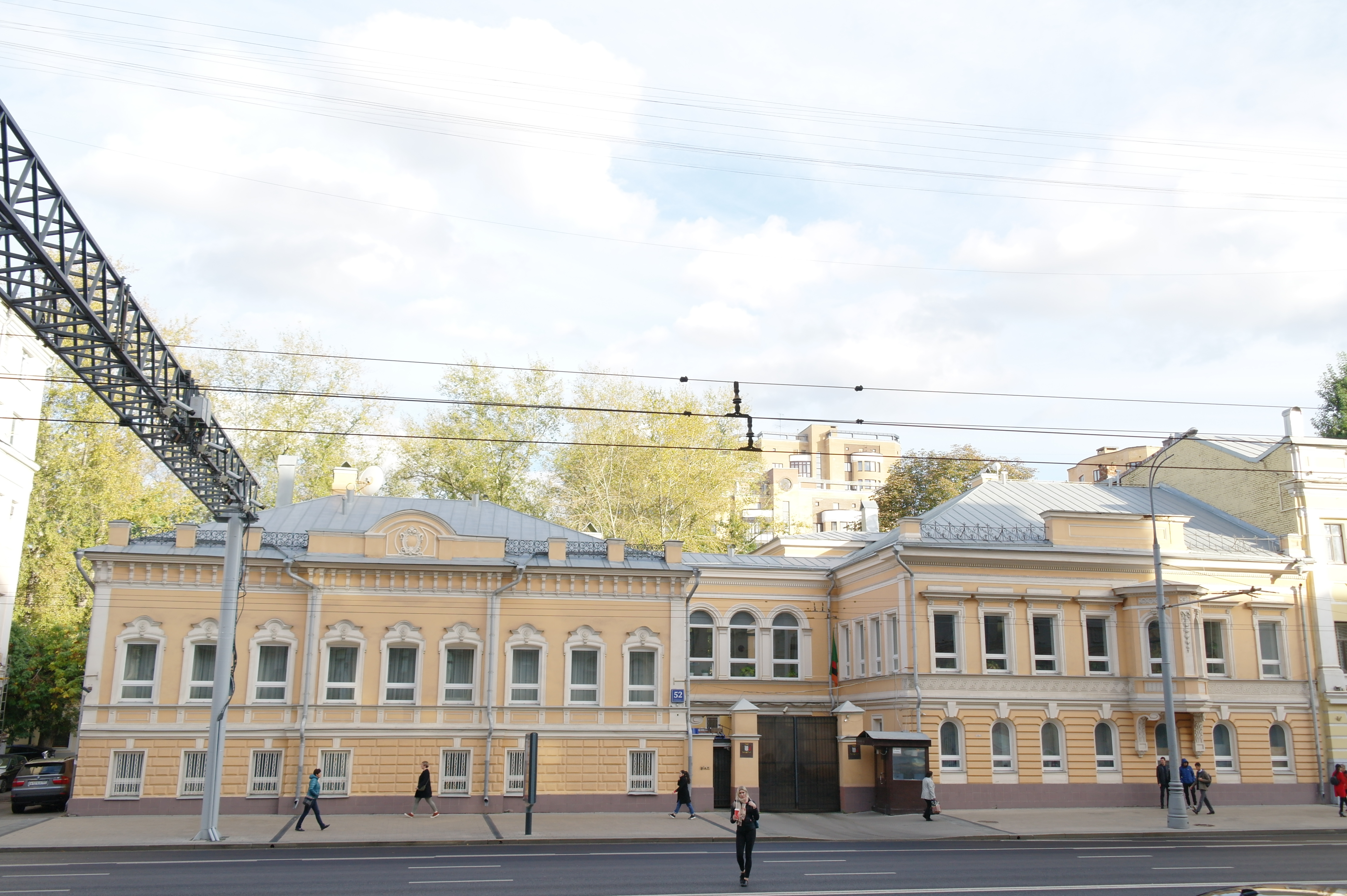
Embassy of Zambia in Moscow.

On 31 December 1991, Zambia recognised the Russian Federation as the successor state to the Soviet Union, after the latter's dissolution. Russia has an embassy in Lusaka, and Zambia has an embassy in Moscow. The current ambassador of Russia to Zambia is Boris Malakhov, who was appointed by Russian president Dmitry Medvedev on 6 October 2008, and presented his Letters of Credence to President of Zambia Rupiah Banda on 22 January 2009. The current ambassador of Zambia to Russia is Frederick Shumba Hapunda.

=== Economic ties ===
Trade and economic relations between Russia and Zambia are regulated by bilateral agreements; and a trade agreement signed by the Soviet and Zambian governments in Lusaka on 17 December 1971.

In 2008, bilateral trade between Russia and Zambia increased from the 2007 level of US$11.4 million to US$17 million. Russian imports from Zambia were mainly of tobacco, and Russian exports to Zambia comprised agricultural machinery, motorcycles, and food.

=== Cultural ties ===
On 25 August 1966, the Soviet and Zambian governments signed an agreement on cultural co-operation, which carried over to the Russian Federation. A Russian Centre of Science and Culture opened in Lusaka in 1989. The centre, which operates within the framework of the Federal Agency for Commonwealth of Independent States, Compatriots Living Abroad and International Humanitarian Cooperation, and in co-operation with the Russian Embassy in Lusaka, carries out political activities with the aim of strengthening relations between Russia and Zambia, by providing the public with objective information on the domestic and foreign policies of Russia, and by providing Russian language training. As of 2013, approximately 1,450 Zambians are enrolled and studying in Russia, making Zambia the largest recipient of Russian government sponsored scholarships in sub-Sahara Africa.

=== Recent development ===
In September 2022, Lemekhani Nathan Nyirenda, a 23-year-old Zambian student, died while fighting in Ukraine after being recruited from a Russian prison. Nyirenda had been studying nuclear engineering at the Moscow Engineering Physics Institute under a Zambian government scholarship. In 2020, he was convicted on drug-related charges and sentenced to nine years in a medium-security prison near Moscow.

The Zambian government was informed of his death by Russian authorities in November 2022, prompting demands for a detailed explanation. It was later confirmed that Nyirenda had been recruited by the Wagner Group, a Russian paramilitary organization, which has been known to enlist prisoners in exchange for amnesty. Wagner's founder, Yevgeny Prigozhin, stated that Nyirenda had voluntarily joined the group and died "a hero."

Nyirenda's family expressed deep concern over the lack of communication regarding his recruitment and deployment, questioning whether he had been coerced. His body was repatriated to Zambia in December 2022, allowing his family to conduct a traditional burial.
