= Embassy of Zambia, Washington, D.C. =

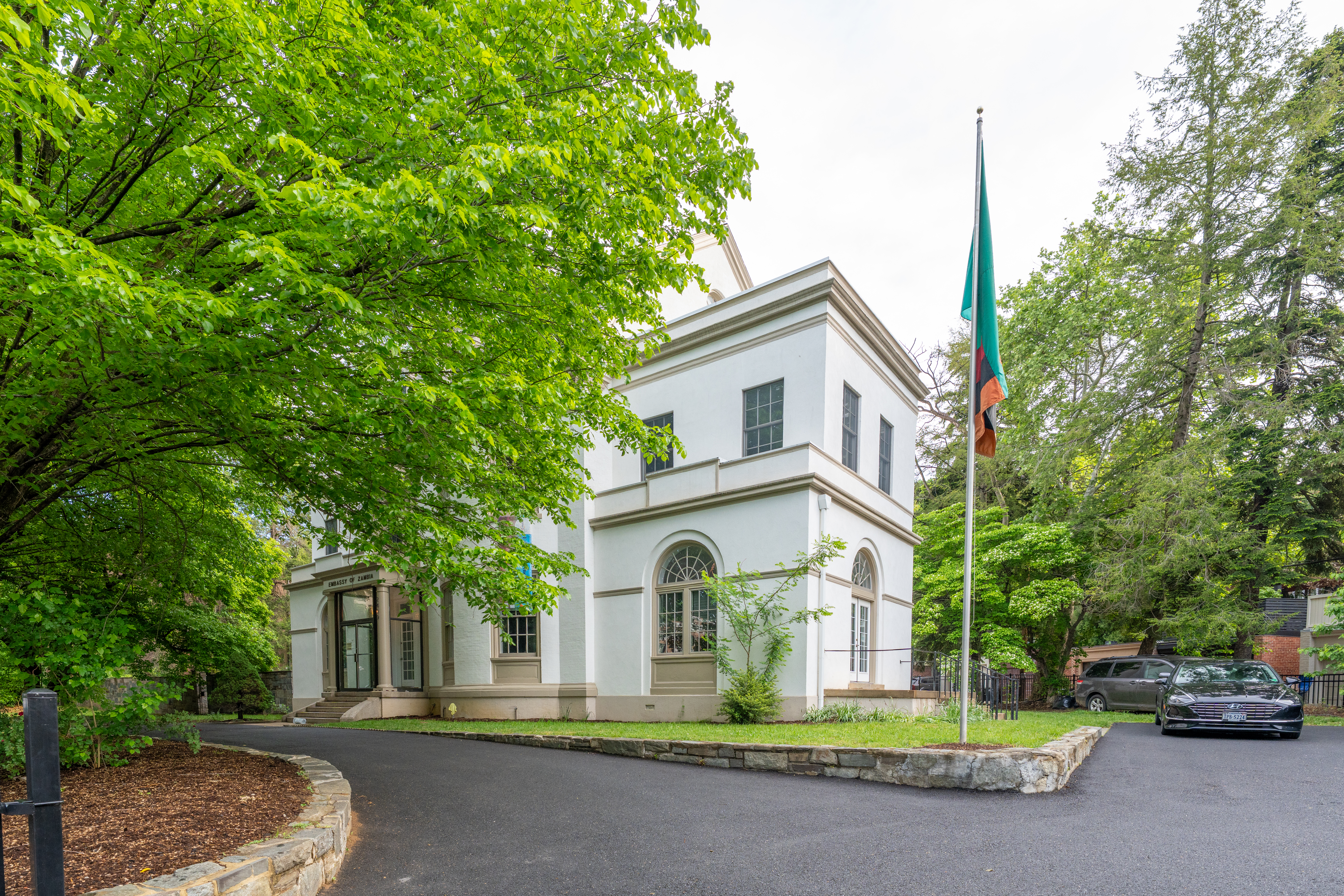
- Location: Washington, D.C.
- Address: 2419 Massachusetts Avenue, N.W.
- Coordinates: 38°54′52.7″N 77°3′12.5″W
- Ambassador: Sheila Siwela

The Embassy of Zambia in Washington, D.C. is the diplomatic mission of the Zambia to the United States. It is located at 2419 Massachusetts Avenue, Northwest, Washington, D.C., in the Embassy Row neighborhood.

The ambassador is Sheila Siwela.
