= Lusaka National Museum =

Museum in Lusaka, Zambia

Coordinates: 15.4220°S 28.2913°E

Lusaka National Museum entrance

The Lusaka National Museum is a museum located in Lusaka, Zambia, covering the history and culture of the nation.

== History ==
In the 1980s, China began working with Zambia to create a museum dedicated to the Zambian independence. By the time the Lusaka National Museum officially opened to the public in October 1996 its focus had changed to cultural history.

== Galleries ==
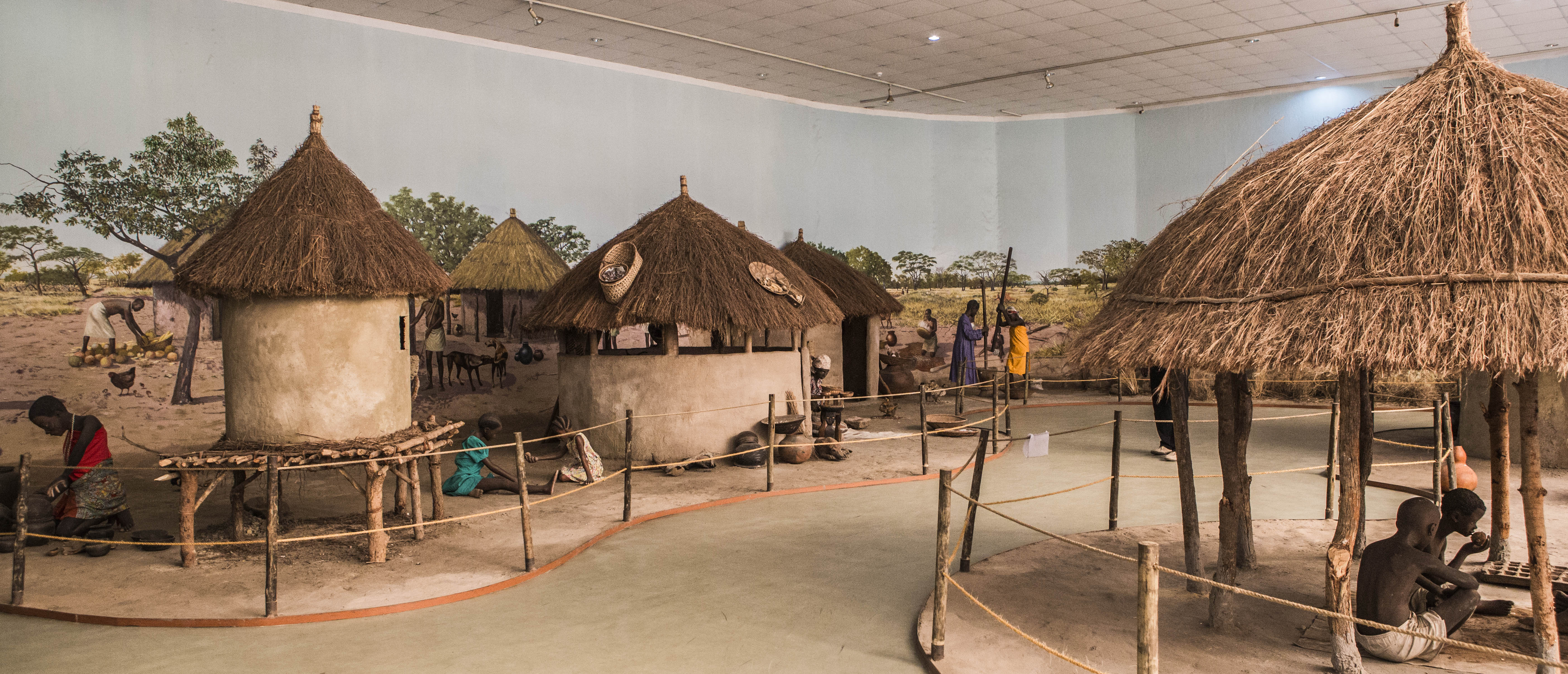
An exhibition in the Lusaka National Museum

The museum has two floors. An archaeological and historical section is found on the ground floor, and a contemporary art gallery, including sculptures and paintings, on the next. The former has information from the Stone Age three million years ago up to modern Zambia. This includes pottery, tools, and ornaments.

== See also ==
- Women's History Museum of Zambia
