= Florence Mumba =

Zambian judge (born 1948)

Her Excellency Florence Mumba

Judge of the Extraordinary Chambers in the Courts of Cambodia
- Incumbent
- Assumed office 2009

Vice-President of the International Criminal Tribunal for the former Yugoslavia
- In office 16 November 1999 – 23 November 2001
- Preceded by: Mohamed Shahabuddeen
- Succeeded by: Mohamed Shahabuddeen

Judge of the International Criminal Tribunal for the former Yugoslavia
- In office 17 November 1997 – 16 November 2005

Personal details
- Born: 1948 (age 77–78) Mazabuka, Zambia
- Education: University of Zambia (Bachelor of Laws)

Florence Ndepele Mwachande Mumba (born in Mazabuka, Zambia in 1948), commonly referred to as Florence Mumba, is a Zambian judge who served in the Extraordinary Chambers in the Courts of Cambodia, also known as the Khmer Rouge Tribunal or the Cambodia Tribunal.

She has also previously served as a judge in the International Criminal Tribunal for the former Yugoslavia, the International Criminal Tribunal for Rwanda and the Supreme Court of Zambia.

== Background and education ==
She was born in 1948 in Mazabuka District in the Southern Province of Zambia. She graduated from the University of Zambia, School of Law in 1972 with a Bachelor of Laws.

== Career in Zambia ==
In 1973, she went into private practice in Zambia, serving in that capacity until 1980. In October of that year, she was appointed as a High Court Judge in Zambia, being the first woman to serve in that role. She represented Zambia at the Conference on Women in 1985 and at the African Regional Conference on Women in 1994.

In 1989, she was appointed to ombudsman. She was then appointed to the Supreme Court of Zambia in 1997.

== Career at the United Nations ==
In 1992, as a member of the United Nations Commission on the Status of Women, she participated in the drafting of a resolution to the UN General Assembly to have rape included as a war crime in the jurisdiction of war crimes tribunals. She served as a member of the International Ombudsman Institute Board from 1992 to 1996. From 1994 until 1996, she served as vice-president of that board. From 1994 until 2003, she served as Commissioner on the International Commission of Jurists.

In 1997, she was elected Judge of the International Criminal Tribunal for the former Yugoslavia (ICTY), serving as Vice President of The ICTY from 1999 to 2001. From 2003 to 2005, she served on the Appeals Chamber of the International Criminal Tribunal for the former Yugoslavia and the International Criminal Tribunal for Rwanda (ICTY/ICTR).

In 2009, she was appointed to the Extraordinary Chambers in the Courts of Cambodia, first as a Reserve Judge, and later as a full-time judge of Supreme Court Chamber of ECCC.

In November 2020, a panel of international lawyers chaired by Mumba and Philippe Sands drafted a proposed international law criminalising ecocide, the destruction of ecosystems.

== See also ==
- First women lawyers around the world
- Government of Zambia
- Judiciary of Zambia
- International Criminal Court
- Elizabeth Muyovwe
