= Simon Kapwepwe =

Zambian politician, independence activist (1922–1980)

Simon Mwansa Kapwepwe

2nd Vice-President of Zambia
- In office October 1967 – October 1970
- President: Kenneth Kaunda
- Preceded by: Reuben Kamanga
- Succeeded by: Mainza Chona

Minister of Foreign Affairs
- In office 1964–1967
- President: Kenneth Kaunda

Personal details
- Born: Simon Mwansa Kapwepwe; 12 April 1922 Chinsali, Northern Rhodesia
- Died: 26 January 1980 (aged 57) Kalulushi, Zambia
- Spouse: Salome Kapwepwe (m. 1946)
- Children: 8; including Chileshe Kapwepwe & Mulenga Kapwepwe
- Profession: Teacher

Simon Mwansa Kapwepwe (April 12, 1922 – January 26, 1980) was a prominent Zambian politician, anti-colonialist, and author, born on April 12, 1922. Kapwepwe made significant contributions towards Zambia's struggle for independence, working tirelessly towards achieving the country's liberation from colonial rule.

Following Zambia's independence in 1964, Kapwepwe served as the country's second vice-president from 1967 to 1970, a period marked by significant political and social changes in the country. As vice-president, Kapwepwe played a critical role in shaping Zambia's political landscape, introducing policies aimed at promoting economic growth and social progress.

In addition to his political career, Kapwepwe was a respected author, known for his works on Zambian history and politics. His contributions towards shaping Zambia's political and social landscape have earned him significant recognition, with Kapwepwe being regarded as one of the country's most influential and revered figures.

Kapwepwe died on January 26, 1980.

== Early life ==
Simon Kapwepwe was born on 12 April 1922 in the Chinsali district of the Northern Province of Northern Rhodesia (which then included the present day Muchinga Province). Although Chinsali was remote from the country's urban centres, it was an area of early educational development, because of the presence of two rival missions, the Presbyterian Livingstonia Mission of the United Free Church of Scotland based at Lubwa (next to the Kolwe River from 1913) and the Roman Catholic White Fathers' Mission (based at Ilondola from 1934). Chinsali's first missionary was David Kaunda from Malawi, the father of Kenneth Kaunda (who became the first African Prime Minister of Northern Rhodesia in 1963 and then the first president of Zambia in 1964). Simon Kapwepwe became the country's second vice-president. Kapwepwe started his primary education in Chinsali. He did his Standard 3 and 4 at Mwenzo, another mission of Livingstonia. In 1942 and 1943 he did his Standard 5 and 6 in Lubwa. In 1944 he became driver at the Public Works Department, and in 1945 a primary school teacher at Lubwa. In September 1947 he went to Tanganyika, looking for work, together with Kenneth Kaunda and John Malama Sokoni. In June 1948 he became an Assistant Welfare Officer with the Kitwe Municipal Council, location Chingola district), and then a teacher at Wusakile Primary School in Kitwe.

== Independence struggle ==
Due to his dissatisfaction with the policies of the colonial Northern Rhodesian government, he became a founding member of the Northern Rhodesian African Congress in 1948. This party was soon renamed the Africa National Congress (ANC) under the leadership of Harry Nkumbula. Kapwepwe was a member of the national executive and became secretary of the Kitwe Branch.

Kapwepwe secured an Indian Village Industrial Scholarship in 1950. He stayed in Bombay from 1950 to 1954, after studying Hindi in Nairobi. Subjects he studied were pottery and journalism. In October 1953 the Central African Federation (or the Federation of Rhodesia and Nyasaland) was created. The African majority's opposition to this new entity was organized by the ANC, but it was not very successful. On Kapwepwe's return to Northern Rhodesia in January 1955 he found the ANC leaderless, since both Harry Nkumbula and Kenneth Kaunda had been imprisoned for two months for distributing literature, considered subversive. Kapwepwe became then Acting President. When Nkumbula returned from prison, he appointed Kapwepwe to the position of Acting Provincial Organizer for Northern Province. In August 1956 Kapwepwe became Treasurer of the ANC, based in Lusaka.

Nkumbula's allegedly autocratic leadership and his willingness to accept in 1958 participation in national elections, which allowed the vote to only 25,000 Africans, led to a rift within the ANC. Kapwepwe, together with Kaunda, Sikota Wina and others, broke away and formed the Zambia African National Congress (ZANC) in October 1958. This party was declared illegal in March 1959, and its leaders were placed under a banning order or jailed. Kapwepwe was sent to Mongu, in Barotseland. While the ZANC leadership was in jail or away, Mainza Chona and other nationalists from ZANC formed a new party, the United National Independence Party (UNIP) to replace ZANC. Kapwepwe and the other imprisoned leaders of ZANC joined the new party. When he was released from jail in December 1959, he helped organize provincial and district branches of UNIP in Barotseland.

In 1960 Kapwepwe and Kaunda attended the Federal Review Conference in London, together with Mainza Chona and Harry Nkumbula. This conference meant the beginning of the end of the Central African Federation, and laid the foundations for the independence of Zambia and Malawi, but not yet for Southern Rhodesia. In October 1962 there were elections in Northern Rhodesia. Kapwepwe challenged Dauti Yamba and won convincingly. The result of the election was a UNIP/ANC coalition government, in which Kapwepwe was given the post of Minister of African Agriculture.

On the other hand, independence in Zambia and many other colonies was gotten on a "silver plate". Britain was struggling after world war 2. Under the Atlantic charter, one condition that was given to Britain was to let go of her colonies in order to gain more aid from the USA.

== Post-Independence ==
The General Elections, held in January 1964, were won by UNIP with 55 seats, as opposed to the ANC's 10 seats. Kapwepwe was given the post of Minister of Home Affairs. In September 1964, he was appointed Minister of Foreign Affairs and held that post for three years. During that time he lambasted the British government for failing to intervene after Rhodesia's Unilateral Declaration of Independence by Ian Smith, the leader of the Rhodesian Front, in 1965.

Despite their friendship from childhood, Kapwepwe and Kaunda drifted apart after leading Zambia to independence. In 1967 Kapwepwe led a rebellion within UNIP. He stood against Reuben Kamanga and won the position of deputy leader of UNIP. As a consequence, Kaunda promoted him to the position of Vice President. He used his new position to put forward economic policies that differed from those of Kaunda's, but his views were sidelined.

He also campaigned for the preservation of Zambian culture through the teaching of indigenous languages in schools. He was Minister of Finance from 1968 to 1969. In August 1969, he offered to resign from the Vice Presidency as well as the deputy leadership of UNIP. This move was precipitated by tribal friction within UNIP. Kaunda did not want to lose him and managed to dissuade him from taking that move. However, in October 1970 Kaunda replaced Kapwepwe with Mainza Chona for the post of Vice President. Kapwepwe was allowed to keep the posts of Minister of Culture and Minister of Local Government.

== "The Evolution of One-Party Rule" ==
Kapwepwe's life in UNIP began drawing to an end when he was linked with rumours of a new party called the United Progressive Party (UPP) that had been formed on the Copperbelt. He did not own up until Kaunda dismissed four cabinet ministers on suspicion of being clandestine members of the new party. In August 1971, Kapwepwe resigned from UNIP and the government and announced that he was, indeed, the leader of UPP. In December 1971 he won a by-election for the Mufulira West constituency, and became his party's sole representative in parliament. Kaunda was not pleased with this development. So, on 4 February 1972, he banned UPP and imprisoned 122 members of the party, including Kapwepwe. Kaunda's excuse was that UPP was an instrument of the Rhodesian, South African and Portuguese governments, which favoured White minority rule. Kapwepwe was kept in prison until 31 December 1972. By then, Kaunda backed by strong political ties with China (The Chinese were critical of European colonial rule of African territories, therefore, sided with a number of African freedom fighters like Kaunda during the liberation struggles for independence. see Taylor, 2006 for an analysis of Sino-African relationship) had neutralized any threat that Kapwepwe could pose: the Chona Commission, under the chairmanship of Mainza Chona, was appointed in February 1972 to make recommendations for the constitution of a ‘one-party participatory democracy’ (i.e. a one-party state). After collecting four months of public hearings, the commission's report was submitted to Kaunda in October 1972. The Second Republic (i.e., the one-party state) was inaugurated on 1 January 1973, the day after Kapwepwe was released from detention.

Kapwepwe was harassed even after he had been politically emasculated. He was arrested in February 1973 for illegal possession of two guns. He received a two-years suspended sentence. The UNIP-controlled Zambian media reported that Kapwepwe had sent people for military training outside Zambia. He sued the Zambia Broadcasting Service, the Times of Zambia and the Zambia Daily Mail for libel and won when he proved that they had made false reports.

Kapwepwe turned his back on politics and went to live on his farm in Chinsali. In the spirit of national unity, Kaunda asked Kapwepwe to return to UNIP in September 1977, which he did. To test his erstwhile friend's sincerity, Kapwepwe stood for the 1978 UNIP's one-party presidential nomination against Kaunda. He was disqualified by last-minute changes to UNIP's constitution. He retired for good from politics and returned to Chinsali. He died on 26 January 1980, after suffering from a stroke two days earlier.

== "Books Authored" ==
Kapwepwe authored a number of books mostly in the Bemba language of Zambia. Among the books in authored was Africa Twasebana published by the Kenneth Kaunda Foundation, 1991 - 286 pages

== Bibliography ==
Taylor, I. (200.6). China and Africa: Engagement and Compromise. Routledge. https://books.google.co.zm/books/about/Afrika_twasebana.html?id=nsUiAQAAMAAJ&redir_esc=y

Preceded by Reuben Kamanga	Vice-President of Zambia; 1967–1970	Succeeded by Mainza Chona
