= Mohamed Shahabuddeen =

Guyanese politician and judge (1931–2018)

Vice-President of the International Criminal Tribunal for the former Yugoslavia
- In office 23 November 2001 – 26 February 2003
- Preceded by: Florence Mumba
- Succeeded by: Fausto Pocar
- In office 19 November 1997 – 16 November 1999
- Preceded by: Adolphus Karibi-Whyte
- Succeeded by: Florence Mumba

Member of the Permanent Court of Arbitration
- In office 1998–2013

Judge of the International Criminal Tribunal for the former Yugoslavia
- In office 16 June 1997 – 10 May 2009

Judge of the International Court of Justice
- In office 1988–1997

Vice President of Guyana
- In office 1983–1988

Minister of Legal Affairs of Guyana
- In office 1978–1987
- Preceded by: Shridath Ramphal
- Succeeded by: Keith Massiah

Attorney General of Guyana
- In office 1973–1987
- Preceded by: Shridath Ramphal
- Succeeded by: Keith Massiah

Personal details
- Born: Mohamed Shahabuddeen; 7 October 1931 Vreed en Hoop, British Guiana
- Died: 17 February 2018 (aged 86) Canada
- Occupation: Politician, judge

Mohamed Shahabuddeen (7 October 1931 – 17 February 2018) was a Guyanese politician and judge. He was judge of the International Court of Justice, judge and twice vice president of the Yugoslavia tribunal and a member of the Permanent Court of Arbitration.

== Biography ==
Shahabuddeen was born in Vreed-en-Hoop on 7 October 1931. He studied law at the University of London, where he returned several times in the course of his career. There he completed in 1953 his Bachelor of Laws. After that, he began his law practice in Guyana and studied at some point, which he completed with the title Master of Laws in 1958. In 1959 he passed the title Bachelor of Science in Economics. During his further career, he continued to study, which earned him the title Doctor of Philosophy in 1970, and in 1986 the title of Doctor of Laws.

Since 1959, he worked for the Guyanese government and in politics until 1962 as a lawyer of the crown, then until 1973 as Attorney General and thereafter as Attorney General of Guyana until 1978. From 1978 to 1987 he was Minister of Justice and Acting Minister Of Foreign Affairs, and since 1983 he was Deputy Prime Minister and Vice President of Guyana.

From 1988 to 1997 he was a judge of the International Court of Justice in The Hague. Subsequently, he was judge and twice vice president of the International Criminal Tribunal for the former Yugoslavia until 2009. In addition, he was an arbitrator at the Permanent Court of Arbitration, also in The Hague, and at the Cairo Centre for International Arbitration. In January 2009, he was elected judge of the International Criminal Court, for a term starting in March of that year. However, in February he served his resignation for personal reasons. He was a member of the Institut de Droit International from 1993.

Shahabuddeen died on 17 February 2018. In May 2022, "Judge Mohamed Shahabuddeen; A pictorial biography", written by his son Sieyf Shahabuddeen, was released on Amazon. The book was revised in September 2023 and is available on Amazon in three formats: * Black and white print edition * Colour print edition, and * Kindle electronic edition.
