= Gwendoline Konie =

Zambian politician (1938–2009)

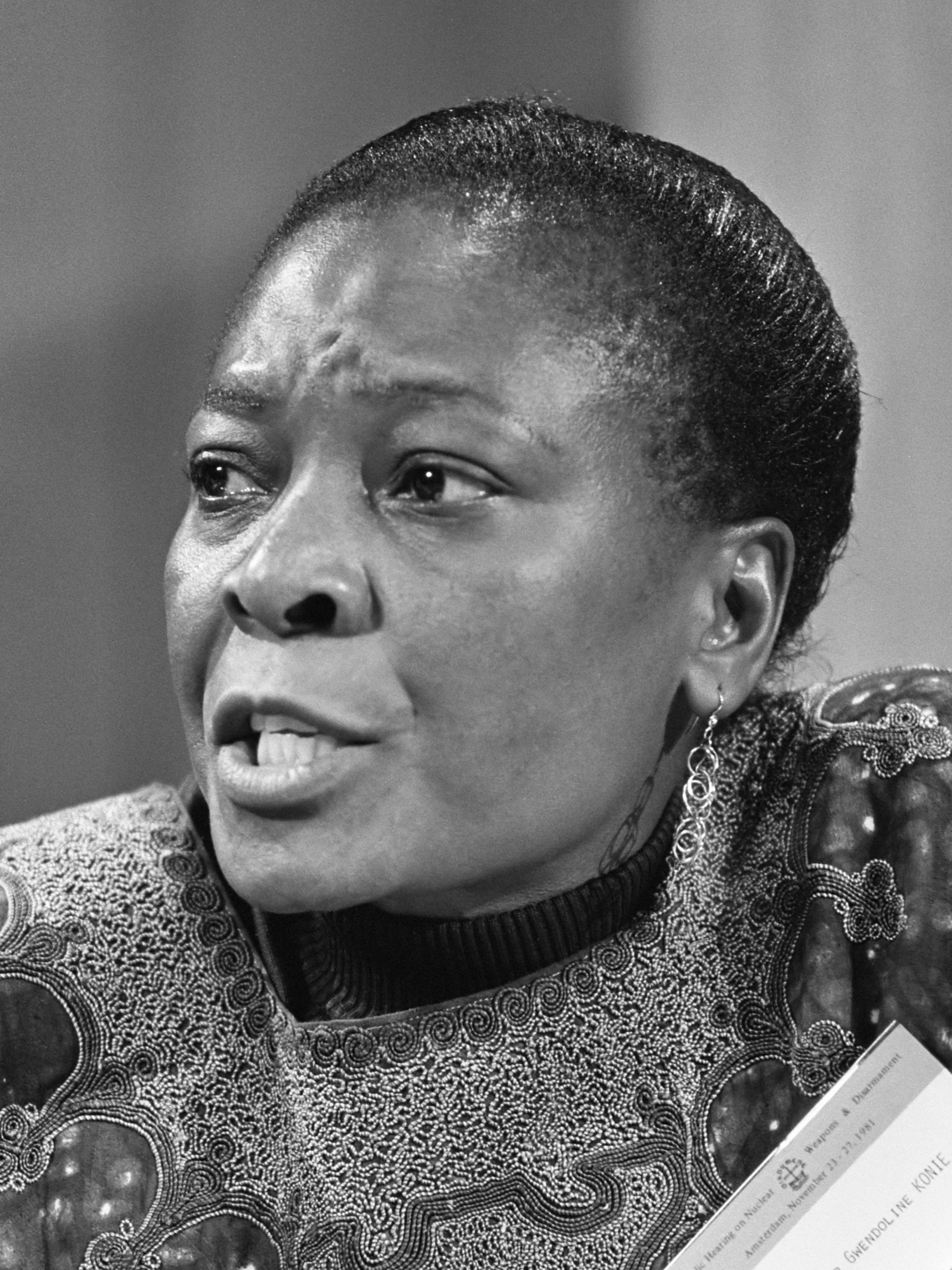
- Born: Gwendoline Chomba Konie; 9 October 1938; Lusaka, Zambia
- Died: 14 March 2009 (aged 70); Lusaka, Zambia
- Education: Cardiff University; American University; University of Warwick
- Political party: Social Democratic Party

Gwendoline Noreen Chomba Konie (9 October 1938 – 14 March 2009) was a Zambian poet, diplomat and politician. She was the Zambian ambassador to Scandinavia, the United Nations and Germany. She formed her own party in 2000 and stood as a candidate to be the President of Zambia in 2001. When she died she was given a state funeral.

== Life ==
Konie was born in 1938 in Lusaka in what was then Northern Rhodesia and is now Zambia. She was educated at Cardiff University in Cardiff, Wales and the American University in Washington, D.C., United States. She received a doctorate in sociology from the University of Warwick.

In 1962, she was chosen by Sir Evelyn Dennison Hone, the Governor-General of Northern Rhodesia, to become a member of her country's Legislative Council. She consulted Kenneth Kaunda before accepting. She then trained for the Foreign Office and rose to be Zambia's Ambassador and Plenipotentiary to Sweden, Denmark, Norway and Finland from 1974 to 1977. From 1977 she was the country's Permanent Representative to the United Nations. In 1979 she became the Permanent Secretary of Zambia's Tourism Ministry. After Kenneth Kaunda lost power she was retained as a diplomat by President Frederick Chiluba until 1997. She was the Zambian Ambassador to Germany.

In 2001, she was a candidate in the 2001 Zambian general election, to be the President of Zambia. She stood for the Social Democratic Party which she formed in August 2000 to concentrate on issues important to women and children. One million votes were cast for eleven candidates in the elections. Two of the candidates were women. Konie received more than 10,000 votes and Levy Mwanawasa was elected.

Konie was also a poet. Her poem "In the Fist of your Hatred" was included in The Penguin Book of Modern African Poetry in 2007. The poem is a polemic against male arrogance.

She died at MKP Trust Hospital in Lusaka in 2009 and received a state funeral. President Rupiah Banda said it was a day for Zambia to mourn her death and Kenneth Kaunda noted her involvement with the formation of Zambia following independence from Britain.
