= Women's History Museum of Zambia =

Digital archive of African women's history

- Women's History Museum of Zambia
- Established: 2016
- Location: Lusaka, Zambia
- Type: Digital museum, Women's history museum
- Key holdings: Over 5,000 digital pieces focused on African women's history and indigenous knowledge
- Collections: Digital archives of Zambian and African women's stories, oral histories, cultural artifacts
- Collection size: 5,000+ digital items
- Founders: Samba Yonga, Mulenga Kapwepwe
- Website: www.whmzambia.org

The Women's History Museum of Zambia (WHMZ) is a contemporary digital collection aimed at reclaiming African women's history and indigenous knowledge. The collection comprises over 5,000 digital pieces presenting women's history through an African lens.

== Background ==
This image, taken by Eric von Rosen and exhibited by the Swedish National Museums of World Culture is an example of the portrayals of Zambian culture that have predominated by outside observers, which the Women's History Museum of Zambia seeks to reclaim.

The Women's History Museum project was established in 2016 with the aim to curate objects to tell the story of Zambian women from an African perspective. Museum founders Samba Yonga and Mulenga Kapwepwe found that much of the narrative on women in Zambia, and Africa more broadly, was distorted through a colonialist lens. They saw there was a need for African women to reclaim their identity and present their history from their own perspective. The digital museum allows the collection's curators to draw on indigenous knowledge and to present information that has meaning to the communities they serve. The museum's organizers have shared how the WHMZ's digital collections can serve as an opportunity to virtually repatriate objects to their native communities.

After its opening, the Museum partnered with the Wikimedia Foundation in an effort to train Zambian writers to document the stories of Zambian women for Wikipedia. However, the organizers soon ran into difficulties as the oral traditions of the country did not adhere to European documentation standards. Museum co-founder Mulenga Kapwepwe shared some of the frustrations behind the project and the importance of the museum in raising awareness,

"Our oral traditions are how we’ve kept our history consistent and constant – in poetry, praise names, village names. We have real reference points that Wikipedia doesn’t recognize...When you write about an African woman who’s never been written about, Wikipedia just says she’s not important and ignores her."

=== Collections and impact ===
By March 2019, the museum had collected over 5,000 digital pieces of storytelling from the 1940s to the present day and planned to house them at the Lusaka National Museum. The museum made use of digital collections to widen access to their collections and to make art accessible to marginalized communities. The Women's History Museum of Zambia established several partnerships with international museums and project partners to share knowledge and build their collections. The WHMZ's "Shared Histories" project uses digitized works to enable both African and international visitors the opportunity to explore a wider variety of works with added context.

In 2019, the Women's History Museum of Zambia formed a creative partnership with the consortium of Swedish museums led by the National Museum of World Culture (including Museum of Ethnography, Sweden) to challenge and display the colonial history of their collections. The collaboration has led to several partnered exhibitions between the institutions. The WHMZ has since partnered with other institutions, including the European Union's Deconfining project to further elevate their work and tell the stories of African women.

== See also ==
- Afrocentrism
- Postcolonialism
- Leading Ladies (podcast)
- Bibliography of the history of Zambia § Gender and sexuality
