= Samba Yonga =

Zambian Journalist

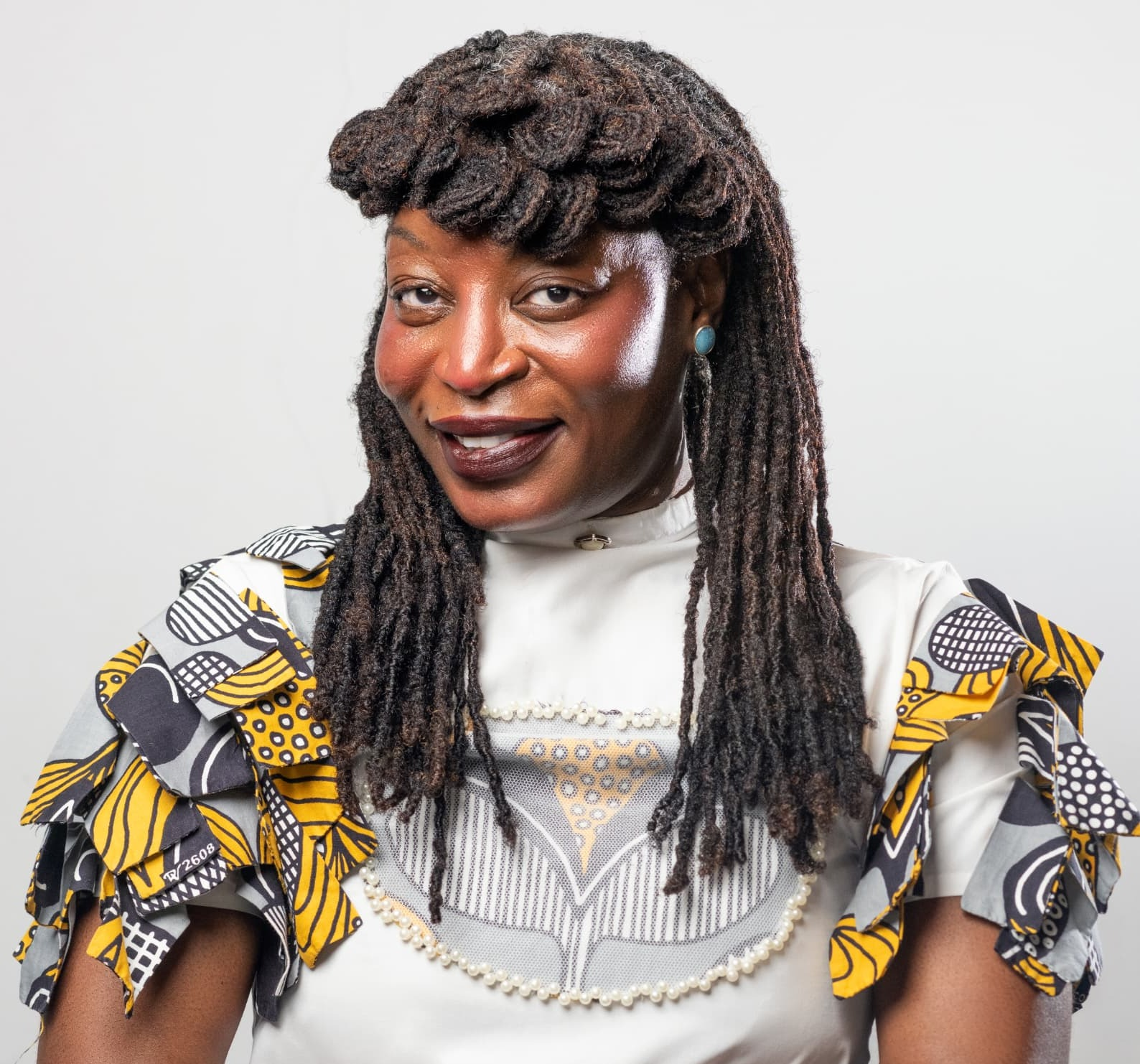
- Born: Lusaka
- Occupations: Journalist, media consultant
- Notable work: Creation of Zambia's Museum of Women's History

Samba Yonga is a Zambian transnational communications expert, cultural curator, and media innovator with over 15 years of experience shaping narratives across Africa and internationally. She is the Managing Partner of Ku-Atenga Media and Co-Founder of the Women's History Museum of Zambia. Known for her work as editorial director of The Big Issue Zambia, she has contributed to several regional and international publications and has been recognised for her leadership in cultural diplomacy and communication strategy. In 2017, she was named one of Destiny magazine’s "Power of 40" most influential women in Africa.

== Career ==
Samba Yonga first became interested in journalism after she won a prize for a short story she had written. She attended college and whilst there worked part-time for a local newspaper. After graduation Yonga found work developing ideas for TV and radio programmes. She was then appointed to run the relaunched Trendsetters youth magazine. Yonga has also written for Okay Africa magazine and The Guardian. Yonga was editorial director of The Big Issue Zambia magazine, which was launched by the International Network of Street Papers in 2007. The magazine was published in six countries and Yonga travelled frequently to visit these.

Yonga established a media consultancy company, Ku-Atenga Media, from the word for "to create" in Luvale, her native language. Shortly afterwards, she left Zambia to study for a master's degree in global media and translation communication at the University of London. Upon her return, she began to expand Ku-Atenga, providing consultancy services on communications strategy. The company now carries out work for local and international clients, including the Zambian government, European Union and the United Nations.

Yonga began the Narratives of Silenced Voices to research and publish the stories of African women from history. The project was run in conjunction with the Kvinnohistoriskt museum, a women's history museum in Sweden, and Zambian activist Mulenga Kapwepwe. Yonga developed the project into the Zambian Museum of Women's History, initially as an online-only offering but with a view to having a physical location to allow display of artefacts collected by the project. The Women's History Museum of Zambia has worked with Swedish ethnographers to facilitate the digital repatriation of Zambian cultural objects and artefacts.

Yonga writes a blog on WordPress. She was named one of Destiny's "Power of 40" most influential women in Africa of 2017.
