= Lazarous Kapambwe =

Zambian diplomat (born 1959)

Permanent Representative of Zambia to the United Nations
- In office 2007–2012
- Preceded by: Tens Chisola Kapoma
- Succeeded by: Ngosa Simbyakula

Ambassador of Zambia to the United States
- In office January 2020 – August 2021
- President: Edgar Lungu

Ambassador to Ethiopia
- In office 2003–2007
- President: Levy Mwanawasa

67th President of the Economic and Social Council
- In office 2011–2012
- President: Michael Sata

Permanent Representative of Zambia
- In office 2017–2020
- President: Edgar Lungu

Personal details
- Born: Lazarous Kapambwe; December 31, 1959 (age 66) Lusaka, Zambia
- Education: University of Zambia, Nairobi University

Lazarous Kapambwe (born December 31, 1959) is a Zambian diplomat, the 17th Ambassador of the Republic of Zambia to the United States of America since January, 2020. He has served as Zambia's Permanent Representative to the United Nations in New York from 18 June 2007 to 31 December 2019. He was the sixty-seventh President of the Economic and Social Council. He has also served as Zambia's Ambassador to the African Union, from June 2003 to June 2007.

== Education and career ==
Kapambwe is a bachelor's degree holder in political economy obtained from the University of Zambia he is also a post-graduate diploma holder in international relations which he obtained from Nairobi University. He served as director for European Affairs from June to August 1996 then he was moved to Director for Africa and Organization of African Unity Affairs from 1996 to 2000. Deputy Permanent Secretary from 2000 to 2002 he served as Deputy Permanent Secretary Asia, Africa and the Middle East. He has also served as Zambia's Ambassador to the Ethiopia, Sudan, Yemen, Djibouti and Somalia.

=== Ambassador of Zambia to the United States ===
In February 2020, former Foreign Affairs Minister Harry Kalaba announced Kapambwe had been expelled from the US, when he was scheduled to present his credentials to President Donald Trump in response to how the Zambian government unfairly treated the American Ambassador to Zambia Daniel Foote who was implicitly expelled from Zambia by then President Edgar Lungu in 2019. However, Foreign Affairs Minister Joseph Malanji stated that he was just swapped positions with Ngosa Simbyakula who was based at Zambia's Mission in Washington, D.C. and the reason he was in Zambia at the time was because he was waiting for a bilateral visa for him to operate in Washington. Vice President Inonge Wina also added that no Zambian diplomat has been expelled by the US Government in retaliation to the expulsion of that country's Ambassador to Zambia Daniel Foote. On July 17, 2020, Donald Trump formally received credentials during the Credentialing Ceremony in the Oval Office at the White House.
