= Nalumino Mundia =

Zambian politician (1927–1988)

4th Prime Minister of Zambia
- In office 18 February 1981 – 24 April 1985
- President: Kenneth Kaunda
- Preceded by: Daniel Lisulo
- Succeeded by: Kebby Musokotwane

Ambassador of Zambia to the United States
- In office 1985–1988

Personal details
- Born: 27 November 1927 (Note: Some sources give 21 November 1927.) Kalabo, Northern Rhodesia
- Died: 9 November 1988 (aged 60) (Note: Reports differ on whether he died on 8 or 9 November 1988.) La Paz, Bolivia
- Party: United National Independence Party (until 1967; later rejoined); United Party (1967–1968)
- Children: 6

Nalumino Mundia (27 November 1927 – 9 November 1988) was a Zambian politician and diplomat. He was the 4th Prime Minister of Zambia, serving from 18 February 1981 to 24 April 1985 under President Kenneth Kaunda. He later served as Zambia's ambassador to the United States, Brazil, Peru and Venezuela.

== Early life ==
Mundia was born in Kalabo, in what is now Western Province.

== Political career ==
=== UNIP and the first government ===
Mundia was a member of the Legislative Council of Northern Rhodesia. After independence in 1964, he served as a minister in Kaunda's first government.

=== United Party and detention ===
In 1967 Mundia broke with Kaunda and joined the United Party, an opposition party founded in 1966 by Lozi-speaking MPs. He became its president.

In 1968 he spoke at a party rally and was detained over his remarks. Party officials including Adamson Mushala and Dickson Chikulo were detained with him. The group was acquitted in August 1968. The government banned the United Party in August 1968, blaming it for political violence.

=== Prime Minister ===
Mundia later returned to UNIP. Zambia had been a one-party state since 1972–73. On 18 February 1981 Kaunda appointed him prime minister in place of Daniel Lisulo. He held the office until 24 April 1985, when Kebby Musokotwane replaced him.

== Diplomatic career and death ==
After leaving office, Mundia became Zambia's ambassador to the United States. He was also accredited to Brazil, Peru, Venezuela and other countries.

He collapsed at a diplomatic function in November 1988 and died of a heart attack, aged 60. His death was announced by the Bolivian Foreign Ministry. He was survived by his wife and six children.

== Legacy ==
In January 2025, the Mweeke Toll Plaza on the M9 road near Mongu was renamed Nalumino Mundia Toll Plaza in his honour.

== Notes ==
Political offices
Preceded by Daniel Lisulo	Prime Minister of Zambia; 1981–1985	Succeeded by Kebby Musokotwane
