= Atan Shansonga =

Zambian diplomat (born 1955)

[[Zambia Ambassador to the United States|Zambia Ambassador to the United States]]

Atan Shansonga (born November 1955) is a Zambian diplomat, and the former Zambian Ambassador to the United States.

Atan Shansonga was born in November 1955.

Shansonga was Ambassador to the United States from 2000 to 2002, and was arrested in Lusaka in 2002 as part of an investigation into the diversion of millions of dollars out of Zambia when President Frederick Chiluba was in office. Shansonga fled from Zambia in 2004, and is now based in England.
