= Mulenga Kapwepwe =

Zambian author and museum founder

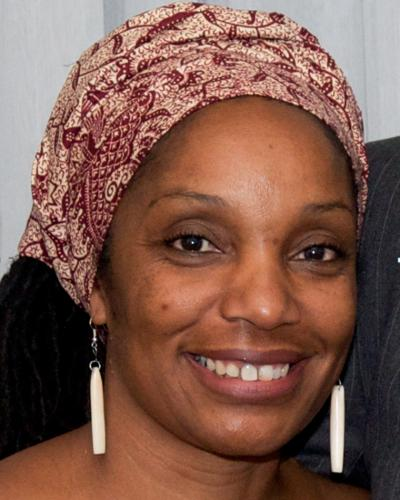
- Born: 7 October 1958 (age 67); Lusaka, Zambia
- Education: University of Zambia
- Occupations: Author playwright
- Relatives: Simon Mwansa Kapwepwe (father); Salome Kapwepwe (mother); Chileshe Mpundu Kapwepwe (sister)
- Writing career
- Notable work: Zambian Women's History Museum

Mulenga Mpundu Kapwepwe (born 7 October 1958) is a Zambian author, social activist and co-founder of the Zambian Women's History Museum.

In addition to her work in preserving and promoting women's history, Kapwepwe is known for her philanthropic efforts, particularly in education.

Kapwepwe has dedicated herself to building libraries in Lusaka, Zambia's capital city, with the aim of providing young children access to education and empowering them to shape their own futures.

== Early life ==
Kapwepwe is the daughter of Simon Kapwepwe, a prominent figure in Zambia's political history who served as the country's vice-president from 1967 to 1970. She pursued Psychology and Sociology at University of Zambia.

== Career ==
Kapwepwe began writing her own plays early on in her career with the lack of a formal theater education. As an author, Kapwepwe has written a number of award-winning plays and books. In addition to writing and producing educational materials, short stories and plays, Mulenga has produced videos, television and radio programmes on a number of subjects.

She served as the chairperson of the National Arts Council of Zambia, from 2004 until 2017. She also served as the Patron of a number of associations, including the Women in Visual Arts Association, the Zambian Folk Music and Dance Association, and the Youth For Culture Association. She has been Vice Chairman of the Ukusefya pa Ngwena Cultural Association, Zambia National Visual Arts Council and The Zambia Women Writers Association . Kapwepwe also sits on the Zambia Commission for UNESCO and the Arts Institute of Africa and is the chairperson of the Arterial Network.

=== Women's History Museum ===
In 2016, Mulenga Mpundu Kapwepwe collaborated with Samba Yonga to establish the Zambian Museum of Women's History. Initially an online-only project, the museum aimed to collect and display artifacts showcasing the contributions of Zambian women to the country's traditional and contemporary history. The project was launched in partnership with Kvinnohistoriskt Museum, a women's history museum in Sweden.

The initiative is a significant step towards promoting gender equality and increasing the representation of women in historical narratives. Through the Zambian Museum of Women's History, Kapwepwe and Yonga seek to expand the number of narratives on Wikipedia related to Zambian women who have made noteworthy contributions to the country's history.

Their efforts have gained significant recognition, with the project receiving widespread praise for its contributions towards creating a more gender-equal society. With plans to establish a physical location for the museum, Kapwepwe and Yonga are expected to continue making meaningful contributions towards empowering and celebrating the accomplishments of Zambian women.

== Awards ==
Awards for Mulenga Kapwepwe
Year	Association	Category	Result
2009	The Ebony Award	Contribution to the field Culture	Won
2011	Zambian National Media Association President's Recognition	Film and television	Won
2012	Zambia Institute of Marketing President's Award	Contribution to the field of Culture	Won
2014	Public Relations Association of Zambia Award	Outstanding Communication in culture and arts	Won
2017	Appointed Arterial Network Ambassador for Africa	Contribution to African creative industries	Won

She was on the list of the BBC's 100 Women announced on 23 November 2020.

=== Artistic achievement ===
Awards for Mulenga Kapwepwe's Books and Plays
Year	Book/Play	Association	Category	Result
1998	Heart of the Cyclone	Ngoma Awards	Best Creative Writing Award	Won
1999	Chiti My Luba	Ngoma Awards	Best Creative Writing Award	Won four Awards
1999	Chiti My Luba	NAATAZ Festival		Won
2000	Kafuti-the Brazen	NAATAZ Festival		Won

== Bibliography ==
- Some Bemba Names and Their Meanings – 2002
- Times and Seasons in Bemba - 2003
- Traditional Bemba Dress and Ornament - 2003
- Traditional Bemba Foods And Beverages - 2003
