= Paul J. F. Lusaka =

Zambian politician and diplomat

President of the United Nations General Assembly
- In office 1984–1985
- Preceded by: Jorge Illueca
- Succeeded by: Jaime de Piniés

Personal details
- Born: Paul John Firmino Lusaka; 10 January 1935 near Lusaka, Zambia
- Died: 11 November 1996 (aged 61)

Paul John Firmino Lusaka (10 January 1935 – 11 November 1996) was a Zambian politician and diplomat who became President of the United Nations General Assembly in 1984.

== Life and politics ==
Lusaka was born in Moomba Village near Lusaka on 10 January 1935. He attended Roma University College in Lesotho where he obtained a degree in history and geography in 1959. The following year he was on an exchange programme that took him to the University of Minnesota funded by the Ford Foundation.

His 1963 Master's Degree in Political Geography was from McGill University in Montreal, Canada, and he was also trained in diplomacy by the Canadian United Nations contingent. In 1964 he was at the Zambian High Commission in London where he rose to the position of Deputy High Commissioner in 1965, which he held until 1968.

From 1968 he served as the Zambian Ambassador to Romania, Yugoslavia and Russia, until he left Russia to become a Permanent Representative at the UN in 1972 as well as a number of other diplomatic positions.

Between 1973 and 1978 he was a Member of Parliament in Zambia, where he held a number of ministerial positions.

== The United Nations ==
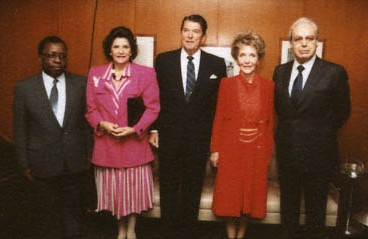
Lusaka with first families of United Nations and United States Marcela Pérez de Cuéllar, Ronald Reagan, Nancy Reagan, Javier Perez de Cuellar in 1984

In 1979 he became the Permanent Representative to the United Nations and as President of the United Nations Council for Namibia. He was vice president in 1980 and in the following year President of the Economic and Social Council. He was Zambia's chief representative at the Security Council in 1979 and 1980.

In 1985 the New York Times recorded that after a meeting with ten former U.N. Presidents he said,

There was no south, there was no north, no east and no west—just the 11 apostles.

== Family ==
Lusaka was married and had nine children.

Diplomatic posts
Preceded by Jorge Illueca	President of the United Nations General Assembly; 1984–1985	Succeeded by Jaime de Piniés
