= Kebby Musokotwane =

Zambian politician

Kebby Sililo Kambu Musokotwane (5 May 1946 – 11 February 1996) was a politician from Zambia. He was a member of the United National Independence Party and one of the closest allies of former President Kenneth Kaunda. He was Minister of Finance from 1981 to 1982. Musokotwane served as the 5th Prime Minister of Zambia from 24 April 1985 until 15 March 1989. He then became secretary-general of the UNIP. When Kaunda stepped down as President of the party in 1992, following the party's election defeat in 1991, Musokotwane was elected President of the party, with Kaunda's support. In 1993 he was embroiled in scandal when he admitted that a radical faction of the party was conspiring to topple the new government of Frederick Chiluba. He died on 11 February 1996 at the age of 49.

Preceded by Nalumino Mundia	Prime Minister of Zambia; 1985–1989	Succeeded by Malimba Masheke
