= Sheila Siwela =

Zambian ambassador

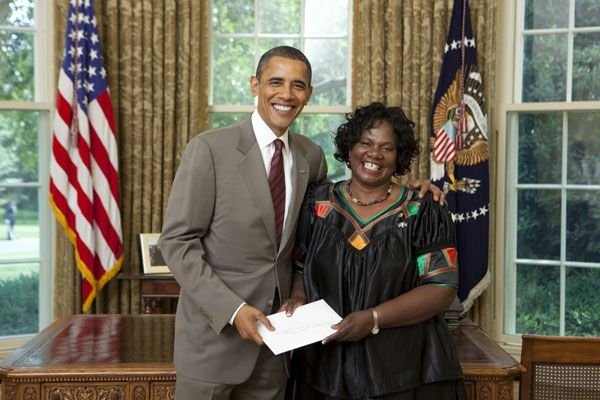
President Barack Obama welcomes Ambassador Sheila Z. Siwela of the Republic of Zambia to the White House on June 28, 2010, during the credentials ceremony for newly appointed ambassadors to Washington, D.C. [White House photo]

Sheila Z. Siwela was appointed as Zambia’s ambassador to the United States on June 25, 2010 and from 2005 to 2008, she was Zambia’s Ambassador to Zimbabwe.

== Education ==
Siwela has a diploma in Social Work from the University of Zambia, a bachelor’s degree in Administration from the University of Western Ontario in Canada, and a master’s degree in Human Resources Development from the University of Manchester in the United Kingdom.
