= Chileshe Kapwepwe =

Zambian accountant and corporate executive

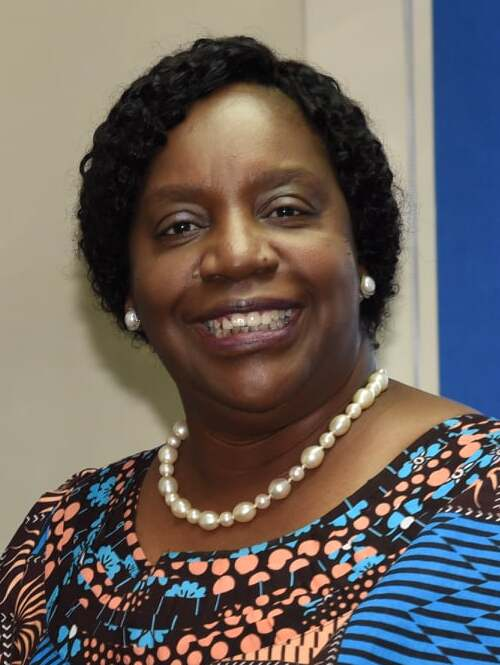
- Born: 10 July 1958 (age 68); Northern Rhodesia (now Zambia)
- Citizenship: Zambia
- Education: University of Zambia (Bachelor of Science in Accounting); University of Bath (Master of Business Administration); Association of Chartered Certified Accountants (Chartered Certified Accountant)
- Occupations: Accountant, Politician and Corporate Executive
- Known for: Accounting, Leadership
- Office: Secretary General of COMESA

Chileshe Mpundu Kapwepwe, is a Zambian accountant and corporate executive, who serves as the Secretary General of the Common Market for Eastern and Southern Africa (COMESA), effective 18 July 2018. She made history as the first woman to be elected to the position,following her election at the 20th COMESA Heads of State and Government Summit in Lusaka, Zambia's capital city.

Immediately prior to her current assignment, she was the chairperson of Zambia Revenue Authority. She replaces Sindiso Ngwenya, from Zimbabwe, whose two consecutive terms in office, had expired.

== Background and education ==
Chileshe Mpundu Kapwepwe was born in Zambia on 10 July 1958. She has a twin sister, Mulenga Mpundu Kapwepwe, who is an author and co-founder of the Zambian Women's History Museum. Chileshe Kapwepwe holds a Master of Business Administration and is a Chartered Certified Accountant. She is a Fellow of the Association of Chartered and Certified Accountants (ACCA) of the United Kingdom, and a Fellow of the Zambia Institute of Chartered Accountants (ZICA).

== Career ==
Kapwepwe is a professional chartered accountant, with experience in the areas of governance, public policy and financial management. Her career extends over more than a quarter century in local, and international organisations, in both public and private sectors.

Past assignments include as the executive director for the International Monetary Fund for the Africa Group One Constituency, based in Washington, DC. She also served as the Deputy Minister of Finance and National Planning, in the Cabinet of Zambia. She has also served, in the past, as the managing director of the Zambia National Airports Corporation. Before that, she was the contracts manager of Société Générale de Surveillance, based in Geneva, Switzerland.

Kapwepwe was the first woman to serve as the chairperson of the Zambia Revenue Authority. She has also served on the board of the Bank of Zambia, BP Zambia Plc and the Zambia Privatization Trust Fund. She also serves as the chairperson at ZEP-RE (PTA Reinsurance Company).

== See also ==
- Trade and Development Bank
