= List of wars of succession =

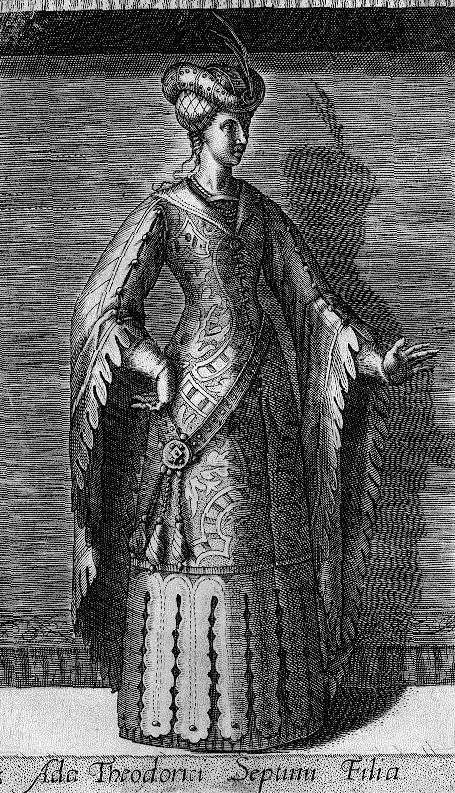
To inherit Holland, Ada quickly married Louis before her father was buried, triggering the Loon War.

This is a list of wars of succession.

Note: Wars of succession in transcontinental states are mentioned under the continents where their capital city was located. Names of wars that historians have given names are capitalized; the others, whose existence has been proven but not yet given a specific name, are provisionally written in lowercase letters (except for the first word, geographical, and personal names).

== Africa ==
- Egypt
- North Africa
- West Africa
- Central and Southern Africa
- East Africa
- Ancient Egyptian wars of succession
  - During the Second Dynasty, the Fourth (2649 BCE) and the Fifth (2513 and 2345 BCE)
  - Between Seti II and Amenmesse (1204–1198 BCE) after the death of pharaoh Merneptah
- Wars of the Diadochi or Wars of Alexander's Successors (323–277 BCE), after the death of king Alexander the Great of Macedon
- Numidian war of succession (118–112 BCE), after the death of king Micipsa of Numidia; this spilled over into the Roman–Numidian Jugurthine War (112–106 BCE)
- Alexandrian war (48–47 BCE), between Cleopatra VII and Ptolemy XIII over the Ptolemaic Kingdom
- Revolt of Nizar (1094–1095), after the death of caliph Al-Mustansir Billah of the Fatimid Caliphate
- Almohad war of succession (1224), after the death of caliph Yusuf al-Mustansir of the Almohad Caliphate
- Hafsid war of succession and Marinid invasion (1346–1347), after the death of caliph Abu Yahya Abu Bakr II of the Hafsid dynasty
- Malian war of succession (1360), after the death of Mansa Suleyman of the Mali Empire
- Sayfawa war of succession (c. 1370), after the death of Mai Idris I Nigalemi (Nikale) of the Kanem–Bornu Empire (Sefuwa or Sayfawa dynasty) between his brother Daud (Dawud) and his son(s), because it was unclear whether collateral (brother to brother) or patrilineal (father to son) succession was to be preferred.
- Moroccan war of succession (1465–1471), after the killing of Abd al-Haqq II of the Marinid Sultanate during the 1465 Moroccan revolution. The Marinid dynasty fell; the Idrisid Mohammed ibn Ali Amrani-Joutey and the Wattasid Abu Abd Allah al-Sheikh Muhammad ibn Yahya fought each other to found a new dynasty over Morocco.
- Ethiopian war of succession (1494–1495), after the death of emperor Eskender of the Ethiopian Empire (Solomonic dynasty)

A diachronic map of various prominent pre-colonial African civilisations

- Adalite war of succession (1517–1527), after the death of sultan Mahfuz of the Adal Sultanate
- Kongolese war of succession (1543–1545), after the death of mwenekongo Afonso I of Kongo
- Bunyoro war of succession (mid-16th century), enthroning Winyi II over the Empire of Kitara in 1570
- Moroccan war of succession (1554), after the death of Sultan Ahmad of the Wattasid dynasty
- Moroccan war of succession (1574–1578), after the death of sultan Abdallah al-Ghalib of the Saadi dynasty
- War of the Songhai succession (1582/3–1591), after the death of emperor Askia Daoud of the Songhai Empire. The war between the two feuding fractions would not cease until the Saadian invasion of the Songhai Empire in 1591.
- Moroccan War of Succession (1603–1627)
- Kongo Civil War (1665–1709), after the death of mwenekongo António I of Kongo in the Battle of Mbwila
- Revolutions of Tunis or the Muradid War of Succession (1675–1705), after the death of bey Murad II of Tunis
- Dahomey succession struggle (c. 1716–1718), after the death of king Akaba of Dahomey
- Yatengan war of succession (1754–1757), after the death of Naaba ("king") Piiyo of Yatenga (modern Burkina Faso) between his brother Naaba Kango and his cousin Naaba Wobgho. Soon after Kango's ascension to the throne, Wobgho forced him into exile. Still, in 1757, Kango returned with Barbara troops with flintlocks (the first recorded use of firearms in Yatenga), and won the war.
- Several Bunyoro wars of succession in the Empire of Kitara in the 17th and 18th centuries, almost always coinciding with rebellions in its tributary states
- Tripolitanian civil war (1790–1795), after the assassination of Bey Hasan of Tripoli. It involved a war of succession between leading members of the Karamanli dynasty, an intervention by Ottoman officer Ali Burghul who claimed to be acting on the sultan's orders and controlled Tripoli for 17 months, and an intervention by the bey of Tunis Hammuda ibn Ali to restore the Karamanlis to power.
- Lozi war of succession (c. late 1820s–1830s), after the death of litunga Mulambwa Santulu of Barotseland between his sons Silumelume and Mubukwanu. The two brothers fought with each other over the succession, and Silumelume initially gained power and started to rule, but was then assassinated (perhaps on the orders of Mubukwanu), and then Mubukwanu began his reign. The Lozi were 'seriously weakened by [the] succession dispute', and then defeated by the Makololo invasion led by Sebetwane.
- Zulu war of succession (1839–1840), between the brothers Dingane and Mpande after the Battle of Blood River
- Burundian war of succession (c. 1850–1900), after the death of Mwami Ntare Rugamba of the Kingdom of Burundi. Great controversy surrounds the parentage and accession of Mwezi Gisabo to the kingship (ubwami), as his older brother Twarereye had been their father's designated heir. The ensuing fratricidal war ultimately led to Twarereye's death in the Battle of Nkoondo (c. 1860) near the traditional capital of Muramvya. Dynastic feuds and challenges to Mwezi's kingship by his other brothers would continue for decades thereafter, and by 1900, Mwezi had only effective control over half his kingdom's territory.
- Bunyoro war of succession (c. 1851), enthroning Kamurasi over the Empire of Kitara
- Second Zulu Civil War (1856), during the late reign of King Mpande of the Zulu Kingdom between his sons Cetshwayo and Mbuyazi (Mpande's favourite and implied successor). As King Mpande was still alive, Cetshwayo's actions could be labelled a princely rebellion, but the literature often refers to the conflict as a "war of succession".
- Gaza war of succession (1858–1862) between brothers Mawewe and Mzila after the death of their father, king Soshangane of the Gaza Empire
- Makololo war of succession (1863–1864), after the death of morêna Sekeletu of Barotseland, between Mamili/Mamile and Mbololo/Mpololo (Sekeletu's uncle, Sebetwane's brother). It resulted in the extinction of the Makololo dynasty of Sebetwane in Barotseland. It led to the enthronement of Sipopa Lutangu (Mubukwanu's son, Mulambwa's grandson). Conventional historiography regards the accession of Sipopa as "the 'Restoration' of the Lozi monarchy and the start of the 'Second Kingdom'", but Flint (2005) argued that the Lozi and Makololo peoples were ethnolinguistically close and had 'effectively merged' in the decades following the accession of Sebetwane, demonstrated by the fact that both groups spoke the 'Sikololo' or 'Silozi' language by 1864. Sipopa was 'on good terms with the Makololo hierarchy' and married Sebetwane's daughter Mamochisane upon his accession.
- Ndebele war of succession (1868), after the death of king Mzilikazi of the Northern Ndebele kingdom of Mthwakazi, won by Lobengula
- Ethiopian war of succession (1868–1872), after the suicide of emperor Tewodros II of Ethiopia following his defeat in the British expedition to Abyssinia
- Bunyoro war of succession (1869), after the death of mukama Kamurasi, enthroning Kabalega over the Empire of Kitara
- Anglo-Zanzibar War (27 August 1896), after the death of sultan Hamad bin Thuwaini of Zanzibar from the House of Busaid. His cousin Khalid bin Barghash of Zanzibar attempted to accede to the throne, but without approval of the British, who favoured a different cousin of Hamad: Hamoud bin Mohammed of Zanzibar. The British bombardment of Khalid's palace compelled him to surrender after about 40 minutes and abdicate in favour of Hamoud, marking the shortest war in recorded history.
- Ethiopian coup d'état of 1928 and Gugsa Wale's rebellion (1930), about the (future) succession of empress Zewditu of the Ethiopian Empire by Haile Selassie

== Asia ==
- Central Asia
- East Asia
- North Asia
- Persia & Afghanistan
- South Asia
- Southeast Asia
- West Asia

=== Ancient Asia ===
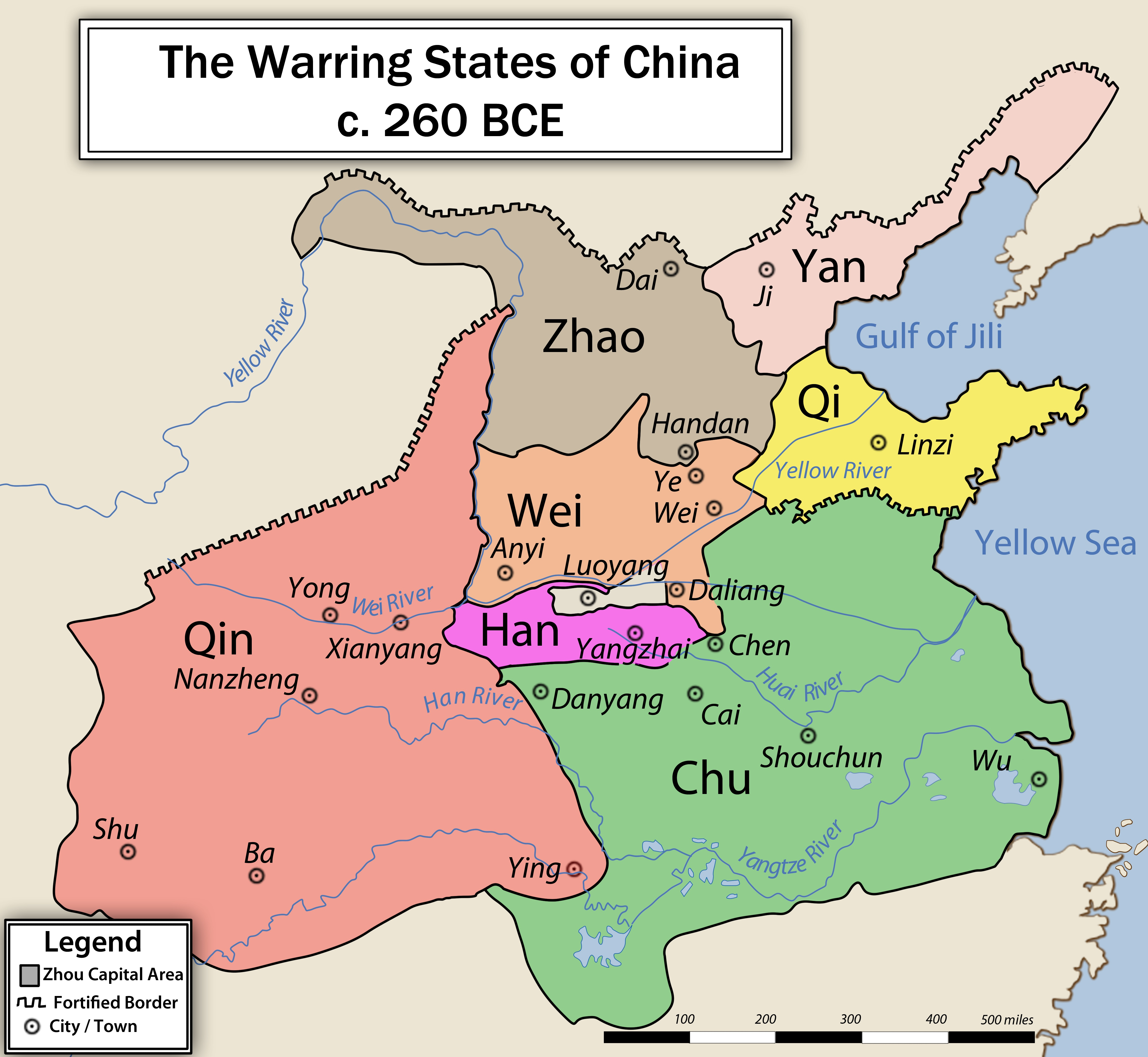
The Warring States, each claiming kingship and seeking to unite China under their banner.

- (historicity contested) Kurukshetra War, also called the Mahabharata or Bharata War (dating heavily disputed, ranging from 5561 to around 950 BCE), between the Pandava and Kaurava branches of the ruling Lunar dynasty over the throne at Hastinapura. It is disputed whether this event actually occurred as narrated in the Mahabharata.
- Hattusili's Civil War (c. 1267 BC)
- Rebellion of the Three Guards (c. 1042–1039 BCE), after the death of King Wu of Zhou
- (historicity contested) War of David against Ish-bosheth (c. 1007–1005 BCE), after the death of king Saul of the united Kingdom of Israel. It is disputed whether this event actually occurred as narrated in the Hebrew Bible. It allegedly began as a war of secession, namely of Judah (David) from Israel (Ish-bosheth), but eventually the conflict was about the succession of Saul in both Israel and Judah
- Neo-Assyrian war of succession (826–820 BCE), in anticipation of the death of king Shalmaneser III of the Neo-Assyrian Empire (died 824 BCE) between his sons Assur-danin-pal and Shamshi-Adad
- Jin wars of succession (8th century–376 BCE), a series of wars over control of the Chinese feudal state of Jin (part of the increasingly powerless Zhou dynasty)
  - Jin–Quwo wars (739–678 BCE), dynastic struggles between two branches of Jin's ruling house
  - Partition of Jin (c. 481–403 BCE), a series of wars between rival noble families of Jin, who eventually sought to divide the state's territory amongst themselves at the expense of Jin's ruling house. The state was definitively carved up between the successor states of Zhao, Wei and Han in 376 BCE.
- Zheng war of succession (701–680 BCE), after the death of Duke Zhuang of Zheng
- War of Qi's succession (643–642 BCE), after the death of Duke Huan of Qi
- (debated) Accession of Darius the Great (522 BCE), after the death of Cambyses II of the Achaemenid Empire. Scholars debate how Cambyses II died, and how Darius the Great got into power, because the sources (such as the Behistun Inscription, Ctesias and Herodotus) contradict each other and are unreliable in certain places. What is clear is that there was some power struggle following the death of Cambyses, possibly involving the assassinations of Cambyses and Bardiya, and coups d'état, that eventually Darius acceded to the throne, and that he had to quell multiple rebellions against his new reign.
- Persian war of succession (404–401 BCE) ending with the Battle of Cunaxa, after the death of Darius II of the Achaemenid Empire
- Warring States period (c. 403–221 BCE), a series of dynastic interstate and intrastate wars during the Eastern Zhou dynasty of China over succession and territory
  - War of the Wei succession (370–367 BCE), after the death of Marquess Wu of Wei. Featuring the Battle of the Turbid Swamp.
  - Qin's wars of unification (230–221 BCE), to enforce Qin's claim to succeed the Zhou dynasty (which during the Western Zhou period ruled all the Chinese states), Qin ended in 256 BCE
- Wars of the Diadochi or Wars of Alexander's Successors (323–277 BCE), after the death of king Alexander the Great of Macedon
- Maurya war of succession (272–268 BCE), after the death of emperor Bindusara of the Mauryan Empire; his son Ashoka the Great defeated and killed his brothers, including crown prince Susima
- Bithynian war of succession (255–254 BCE), after the death of king Nicomedes I of Bithynia
- Chu–Han Contention (206–202 BCE), after the surrender and death of emperor Ziying of the Qin dynasty; the rival rebel leaders Liu Bang and Xiang Yu sought to set up their own new dynasties
- Lü Clan Disturbance (180 BCE), after the death of Empress Lü of the Han dynasty

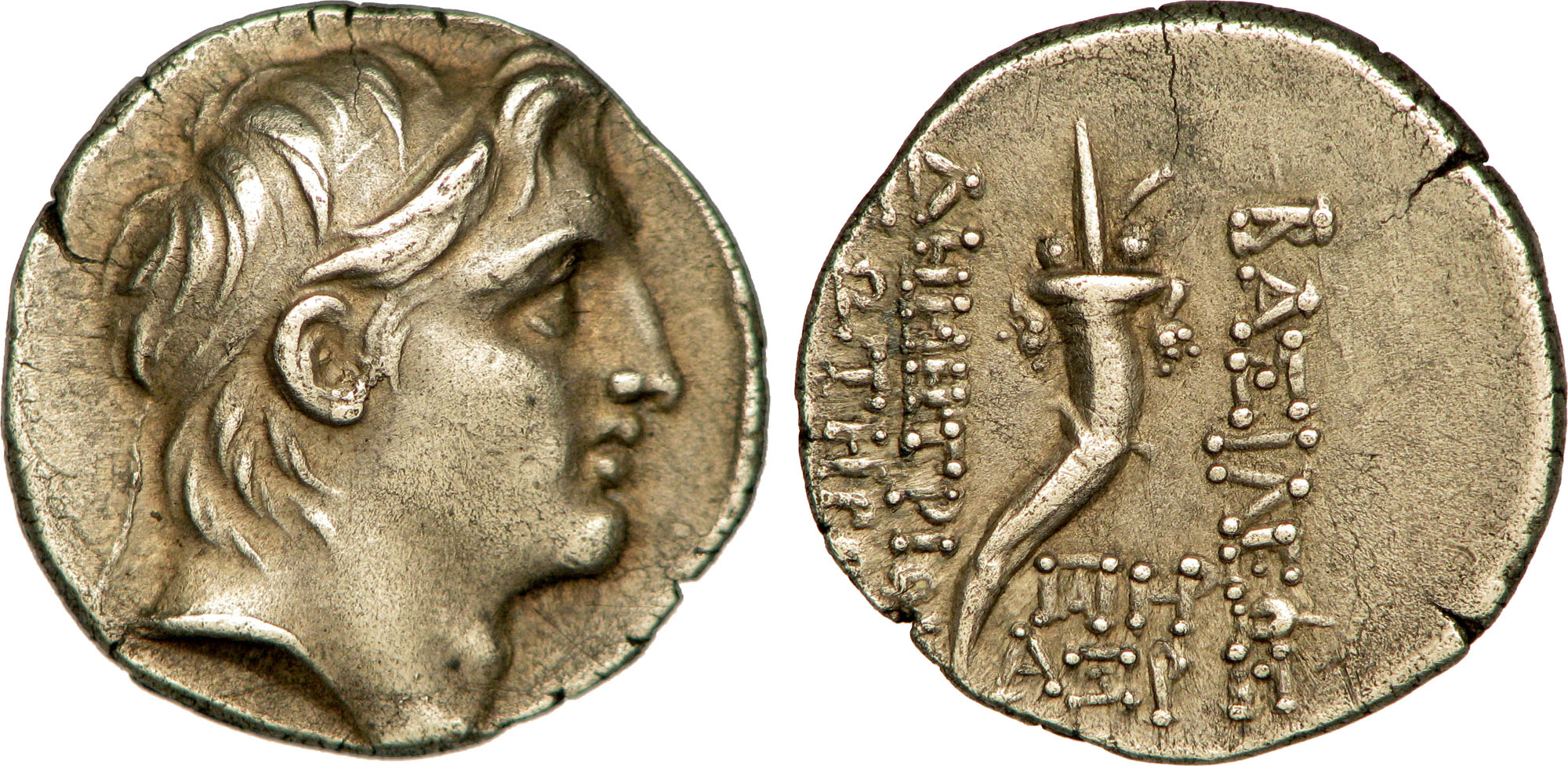
The Seleucid Dynastic Wars ravaged the once great Seleucid Empire, and contributed to its fall.

- Seleucid Dynastic Wars (157–63 BCE), a series of wars of succession that were fought between competing branches of the Seleucid Royal household for control of the Seleucid Empire
- (uncertain) Bactrian war of succession (c. 145–130 BCE), after the assassination of king Eucratides I of the Greco-Bactrian Kingdom, between his sons Eucratides II, Heliocles I and Plato
- Third Mithridatic War (73–63 BCE), after the death of king Nicomedes IV of Bithynia between the Roman Republic and the Kingdom of Pontus
- Hasmonean Civil War (67–63 BCE), after the death of queen Salome Alexandra of Hasmonean Judea between her sons Aristobulus II and Hyrcanus II
- Parthian war of succession (57–54 BCE), between Mithridates IV and his brother Orodes II after killing their father, king Phraates III
  - The Roman invasion of Parthia in 54 BCE, ending catastrophically at the Battle of Carrhae in 53 BCE, was partially motivated by or justified as supporting Mithridates' claim to the Parthian throne
- Red Eyebrows and Lulin Rebellions (17–23 CE), revolts against Xin dynasty emperor Wang Mang to restore the Han dynasty; both rebel armies had their own candidates, however
- Han civil war (23–36), Liu Xiu's campaigns against pretenders and regional warlords who opposed the rule of the Gengshi Emperor (23–25) and his own rule (since 25)
  - Second Red Eyebrows Rebellion (23–27), after the death of Wang Mang, against the Gengshi Emperor, the Lulin rebel candidate to succeed Wang Mang
- War of the Armenian Succession (54–66), caused by the death of Roman emperor Claudius, after which the rival pretender Tiridates was installed by king Vologases I of Parthia, unacceptable to new emperor Nero
- Parthian wars of succession between Vologases III, Osroes I, Parthamaspates, Mithridates V and Vologases IV (105–147), after the death of king Pacorus II of Parthia
  - Trajan's Parthian campaign (115–117), the intervention of the Roman emperor Trajan in favour of Parthamaspates
- Three Kingdoms Period (184–280), after the death of emperor Ling of Han (Note: In the strict sense, the Three Kingdoms Period didn't begin until 220, when the last Han emperor Xian was forced to abdicate by Cao Pi, who proclaimed himself emperor of the Wei dynasty. This claim was soon challenged by Liu Bei, who pretended to be the rightful successor to Xian, and crowned himself emperor of "Shu-Han" (221), and Sun Quan, who first received the title of "king of Wu" by Cao Pi before becoming the third claimant to the imperial title in 229. However, the dismemberment of the Chinese Empire by infighting warlords had already begun in 184, when the Yellow Turban Rebellion and the Liang Province Rebellion broke out. Although the former was suppressed, the latter was maintained, and the rebels continued to form a "de facto" autonomous state in Liang for two more decades. The emperorship itself was already in danger in 189 when, after the death of Emperor Ling, first the eunuchs and later Dong Zhuo seized control at the imperial court, against which the governors and nobility rose fruitlessly, before getting into combat with each other and setting up rival warlord states.)
  - Yuan clan war of succession (202–205), after the death of clan leader Yuan Shao
- Dynastic struggle between Vologases VI and Artabanus IV (213–222), after the death of their father Vologases V of Parthia
  - Parthian war of Caracalla (216–217), Roman intervention in the Parthian dynastic struggle against Artabanus IV
- War of the Eight Princes (291–306), after the death of emperor Sima Yan of the Chinese Jin dynasty
- (historicity contested) A war of succession in the Gupta Empire after the death of emperor Kumaragupta I (c. 455), out of which Skandagupta emerged victorious. Historical sources do not clearly indicate whether the events described constituted a war of succession, nor whether they even occurred as narrated.
- Sasanian war of succession (457–459) between Hormizd III and Peroz I after the death of their father, shahanshah Yazdegerd II of the Sasanian Empire
- War of the Uncles and Nephews (465–c.495) after the death of emperor Qianfei of the Liu Song dynasty
- Prince Hoshikawa Rebellion (479–480), after the death of Emperor Yuryaku of Japan

=== Medieval Asia ===
- Wei civil war (530–550), after the assassination of would-be usurper Erzhu Rong by emperor Xiaozhuang of Northern Wei, splitting the state into Western Wei (Yuwen clan) and Eastern Wei (Gao clan)
- Göktürk civil war or Turkic interregnum (581–587), after the death of Gökturk khagan Taspar Qaghan of the First Turkic Khaganate
- Yamato war of succession (585–587), after the death of emperor Bidatsu of Yamato (Japan). Also the final phase of the religion-based Soga–Mononobe conflict (552–587) between the pro-Shinto Mononobe clan and the pro-Buddhist Soga clan.
- Sasanian civil war of 589-591, about the deposition, execution and succession of shahanshah Hormizd IV of the Sasanian Empire
- Byzantine–Sasanian War of 602–628, Khosrow II invaded the Byzantine Empire under the pretext of installing a pseudo-Theodosius to the throne following the murder of emperor Maurice
- Sui war of succession (604), after the death of Emperor Wen of the Sui dynasty
- Chalukya war of succession (c. 609), after the death of king Mangalesha of the Chalukya dynasty
- Transition from Sui to Tang (613–628): with several rebellions against his rule going on, Emperor Yang of Sui was assassinated in 618 by rebel leader Yuwen Huaji, who put Emperor Yang's nephew Yang Hao on the throne as puppet emperor, while rebel leader Li Yuan, who had previously made Emperor Yang's grandson Yang You his puppet emperor, forced the latter to abdicate and proclaimed himself emperor, as several other rebel leaders had also done.
- Xuanwu Gate Incident (626): with Prince Li Shimin and his followers assassinating his brothers Crown Prince Li Jiancheng and Prince Li Yuanji. About two months later, Li Yuan (Emperor Gaozu of Tang) abdicated and passed the throne to Li Shimin, who would become known as Emperor Taizong of Tang.
- Sasanian civil war of 628–632 or Sasanian Interregnum, after the execution of shahanshah Khosrow II of the Sasanian Empire

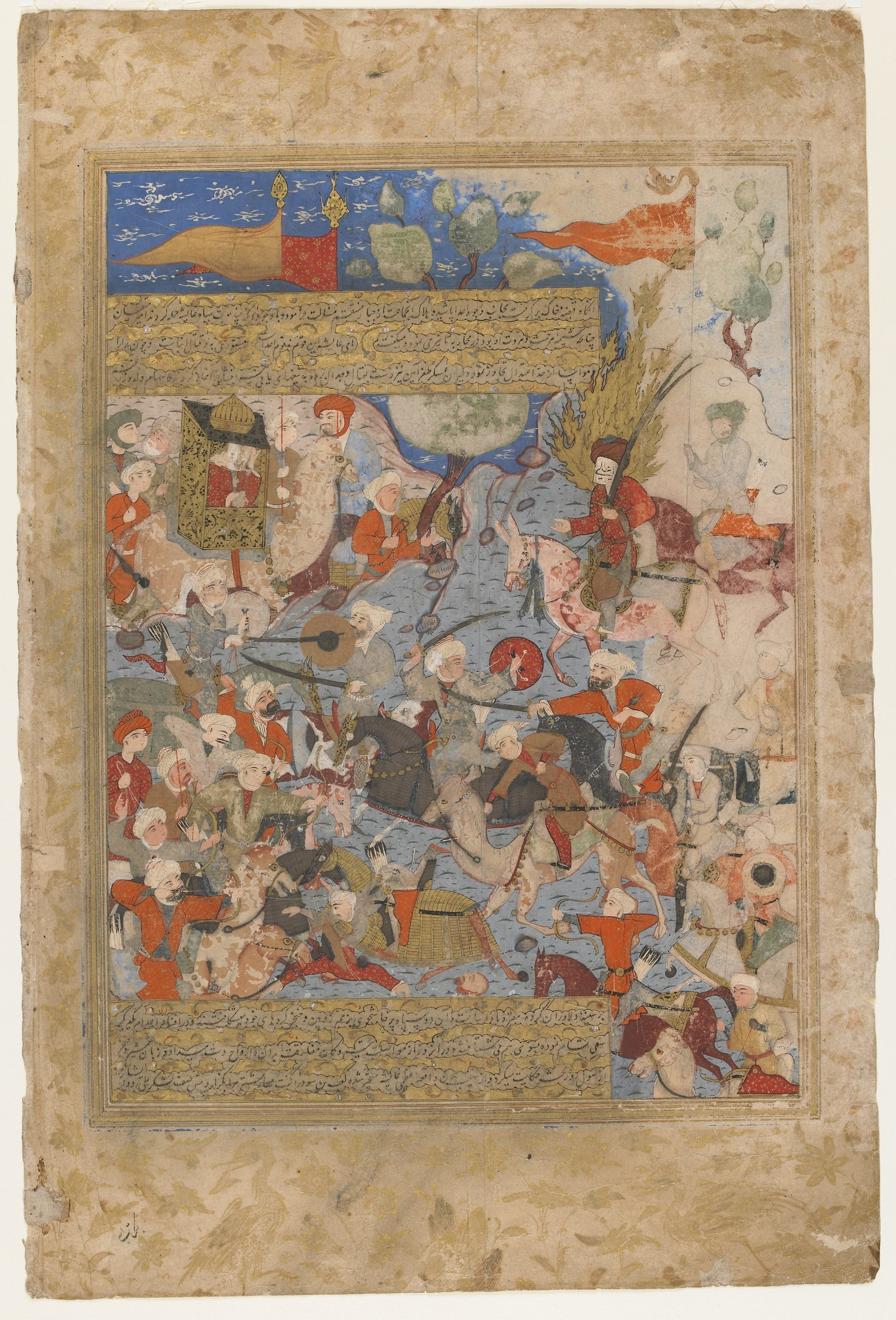
Ali and Aisha at the Battle of the Camel. Originally a political conflict on the Succession to Muhammad, the First Fitna became the basis of the religious split between Sunni Islam and Shia Islam.

- The historical Fitnas in Islam:
  - First Fitna (656–661), after the assassination of caliph Uthman of the Rashidun Caliphate between the Umayyads and Ali's followers (Shiites)
  - Second Fitna (680–692; in strict sense 683–685), after the death of caliph Mu'awiya I of the Umayyad Caliphate between Umayyads, Zubayrids and Alids (Shiites)
  - Third Fitna (744–750/752): a series of civil wars within and rebellions against the Umayyad Caliphate, starting with the assassination of caliph Al-Walid II, and ending with the Abbasid Revolution
  - Fourth Fitna (811–813): under the reign of the caliph Muhammad Al-Amin of the Abbasid Caliphate
  - Fifth Fitna (865–866); after the death of Al-Muntasir of the Abbasid Caliphate.
- War of the Goguryeo succession (666–668), after the death of military dictator Yŏn Kaesomun of Goguryeo, see Goguryeo–Tang War (645–668)
- Jinshin War (672), after the death of emperor Tenji of Yamato (Japan)
- Twenty Years' Anarchy (695–717), after the deposition of emperor Justinian II of the Byzantine Empire
- Abbasid war of succession (754), after the death of the first Abbasid caliph As-Saffah. Decisive battle at Nisibis in November 754.
- Rashtrakuta war of succession (c. 793), after the death of emperor Dhruva Dharavarsha of the Rashtrakuta dynasty
- Era of Fragmentation (842–1253), after the assassination of emperor Langdarma of the Tibetan Empire
- Anarchy at Samarra (861–870), after the assassination of caliph Al-Mutawakkil of the Abbasid Caliphate
  - Abbasid civil war or Fifth Fitna (865–866), after the death of caliph Al-Muntasir of the Abbasid Caliphate
- Later Three Kingdoms of Korea (892–936), began when two rebel leaders, claiming to be heirs of the former kings of Baekje and Goguryeo, revolted against the reign of Queen Jinseong of Silla
- Five Dynasties and Ten Kingdoms period (907–979), after the deposition (and 908) murder of emperor Ai of Tang, ending the Tang dynasty. Subsequent decades witnessed widespread warfare between various warlords who claimed to have succeeded or restored the Tang dynasty.
- Pratihara war of succession (c. 910–913), after the death of king Mahendrapala I of the Gurjara-Pratihara dynasty
- Covenant Crossing (947) after the death of Emperor Taizong of Liao (Liao dynasty)
- Buyid war of succession (949–979), after the death of emir Imad al-Dawla of the Buyid dynasty
- Anarchy of the 12 Warlords (966–968), after the death of King Ngô Quyền of Vietnam
- Samanid war of succession (961–962), after the death of emir Abd al-Malik I of the Samanid Empire between his brother Mansur (supported by Fa'iq) and his son Nasr (supported by Alp-Tegin). Alp-Tegin lost, but managed to establish an autonomous governorship in Ghazni, where his son-in-law Sabuktigin founded the Ghaznavid dynasty in 977.
- Buyid war of succession (983–998), after the death of emir 'Adud al-Dawla of the Buyid dynasty
- Ghaznavid war of succession (997–998), after the death of emir Sabuktigin of the Ghaznavids
- Khmer war of succession (c. 1001–1006/11), after the death of king Jayavarman V of the Khmer Empire between Udayadityavarman I (r. 1001–1002), Suryavarman I (r. 1002/6–1050) and Jayavirahvarman (r. 1002–1010/11)
- Ghaznavid war of succession (1030), between Mas'ud and Muhammad after the death of Sultan Mahmud of Ghazni.
- Ghaznavid war of Succession (1041), after the death of sultan Mas'ud I of Ghazni
- Seljuk war of succession (1063), after the death of Sultan Tughril, founder of the Seljuk Empire
- Seljuk war of succession (1072–1073), after the death of sultan Alp Arslan of the Seljuk Empire. Decided at the Battle of Kerj Abu Dulaf.
- Seljuk war of Succession (1092–1105), after the death of Sultan Malik Shah I of the Seljuk Empire
- Seljuk war of succession in Iraq (1131–1134?), after the death of Mahmud II, the Seljuk sultan of Baghdad
- Seljuk war of succession in Iraq and Persia (1152–1159), after the death of Ghiyath ad-Din Mas'ud, the Seljuk sultan of Baghdad and Hamadan
- Hōgen Rebellion (1156), Heiji Rebellion (1160) and Genpei War (1180–1185), after the death of emperor Konoe of Japan, between clans over control of the imperial family
- Pandyan Civil War (1169–1177): king Parakrama Pandyan I and his son Vira Pandyan III against Kulasekhara Pandya of Chola
- War of the Antiochene Succession (1201–1219), after the death of Prince Bohemond III of Antioch
- Cilician war of succession (c. 1219–1221), after the death of king Leo I of Armenian Cilicia
- War of the Lombards (1228–1243), after the death of Queen Isabella II of Jerusalem and Cyprus
- Ayyubid war of succession (1238–1249), after the death of Sultan Al-Kamil of the Ayyubid dynasty
- Toluid Civil War (1260–1264), after the death of great khan Möngke Khan of the Mongol Empire between Ariq Böke and Kublai Khan
  - Berke–Hulagu war (1262), a proxy war of the Toluid Civil War; Hulagu supported Kublai, Berke supported Ariq Böke.
- Kaidu–Kublai war (1268–1301/4), continuation of the Toluid Civil War caused by Kaidu's refusal to recognise Kublai Khan as the new great khan
- Chagatai wars of succession (1307–1331), after the death of khan Duwa of the Chagatai Khanate
  - War between Taliqu and Kebek (1308–1309?), after the death of khan Könchek of the Chagatai Khanate
- Pandya Fratricidal War (c. 1310–?), after the death of king Maravarman Kulasekara Pandyan I of the Pandya dynasty
- Golden Horde war of succession (1312–1320?), after the death of khan Toqta of the Golden Horde
- War of the Two Capitals (1328–1332), after the death of emperor Yesün Temür of the Yuan dynasty
- Disintegration of the Ilkhanate (1335–1353), after the death of il-khan Abu Sa'id of the Ilkhanate
- Chagatai wars of succession (1334–1347), after the deposition and killing of khan Tarmashirin of the Chagatai Khanate. As a result, the Chagatai Khanate effectively split into Transoxania in the west, and Moghulistan in the east.
- Nanboku-chō period or Japanese War of Succession (1336–1392), after the ousting and death of emperor Go-Daigo of Japan
- Trapezuntine Civil War (1340–1349), after the death of emperor Basil of Trebizond
- Tughlugh Timur's invasions of Transoxania (1360–1361), after the assassination of Amir Qazaghan of Transoxania
- Ottoman war of succession (1362), after the death of sultan Orhan between şehzade (prince) Murad I, şehzade Ibrahim Bey (1316–1362; governor of Eskişehir) and şehzade Halil. Murad won and executed his half-brothers Ibrahim and Halil, the first recorded instance of Ottoman royal fratricide.
- Forty Years' War (1368–1408) after the death of king Thado Minbya of Ava; the war raged within and between the Burmese kingdoms of Ava and Pegu as the successors of the Pagan Kingdom
- Tran war of succession (1369–1390), after the death of king Trần Dụ Tông of the Trần dynasty
- Delhi war of succession (1394–1397), after the death of Sultan Ala ud-din Sikandar Shah of the Tughlaq dynasty (Delhi Sultanate)
- Strife of Princes (1398–1400), after king Taejo of Joseon appointed his eighth son as his successor instead of his disgruntled fifth, who rebelled when he learnt that his half-brother was conspiring to kill him (see also History of the Joseon dynasty § Early strife)
- Jingnan Rebellion (1399–1402), after the death of the Hongwu Emperor of the Ming dynasty
- Regreg War (1404–1406), resulting from succession disputes after the death (1389) of king Hayam Wuruk of the Majapahit Empire
- Timurid wars of succession (1405–1507):
  - First Timurid war of succession (1405–1409/11), after the death of Amir Timur of the Timurid Empire
  - Second Timurid war of succession (1447–1459), after the death of sultan Shah Rukh of the Timurid Empire
  - Third Timurid war of succession (1469–1507), after the death of Sultan Abu Sa'id Mirza of the Timurid Empire
- Sekandar–Zain al-'Abidin war (1412–1415): according to the Ming Shilu, Sekandar was the younger brother of the former king, rebelled and plotted to kill the current king Zain al-'Abidin to claim the throne of the Samudera Pasai Sultanate; however, the Ming dynasty had recognised the latter as the legitimate ruler, and during the fourth treasure voyage of admiral Zheng He, the Chinese intervened and defeated Sekandar.
- Ottoman war of succession (1421–1422/30), after the death of sultan Mehmed I of the Ottoman Empire between his younger brother Mustafa Çelebi, his oldest son Murad II, and his second-oldest son Küçük Mustafa
  - During the Siege of Thessalonica (1422–1430), a Turkish pretender (known as "Pseudo-Mustafa") claiming to be Mustafa Çelebi was supported by the Byzantines
- Gaoxu rebellion (1425), after the death of the Hongxi Emperor of the Chinese Ming dynasty
- Kakitsu Chaos (July–September 1441), after the assassination of shogun Ashikaga Yoshinori of Japan. Not to be confused with the Kakitsu uprising that happened simultaneously.
- Shiro Furi Rebellion (1453), after the death of king Shō Kinpuku of the Ryukyu Kingdom, between the king's son Shiro (志魯, also Shiru, Chinese Shilu) and his younger brother Furi (布里, also Buri, Chinese Buli).
- Sengoku period (c. 1467–1601) in Japan
  - Ōnin War (1467–1477), after the 1464 abdication of Emperor Go-Hanazono of Japan in favour of Emperor Go-Tsuchimikado, as well as the imminent succession of shōgun Ashikaga Yoshimasa of Japan
- Aq Qoyunlu war(s) of succession (1470s–1501), after the death of shahanshah Uzun Hasan of the Aq Qoyunlu state

=== Early Modern Asia ===
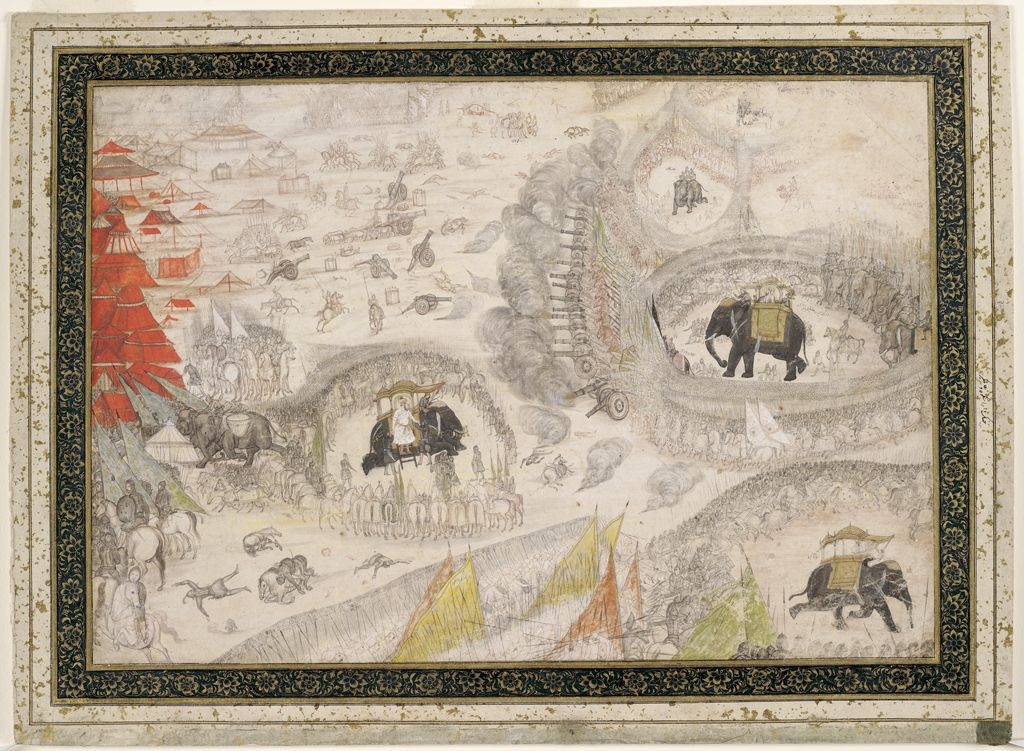
War of 1657–61. Mughal emperors were often overthrown by their sons, who then fought to the death against each other (takht ya takhta).

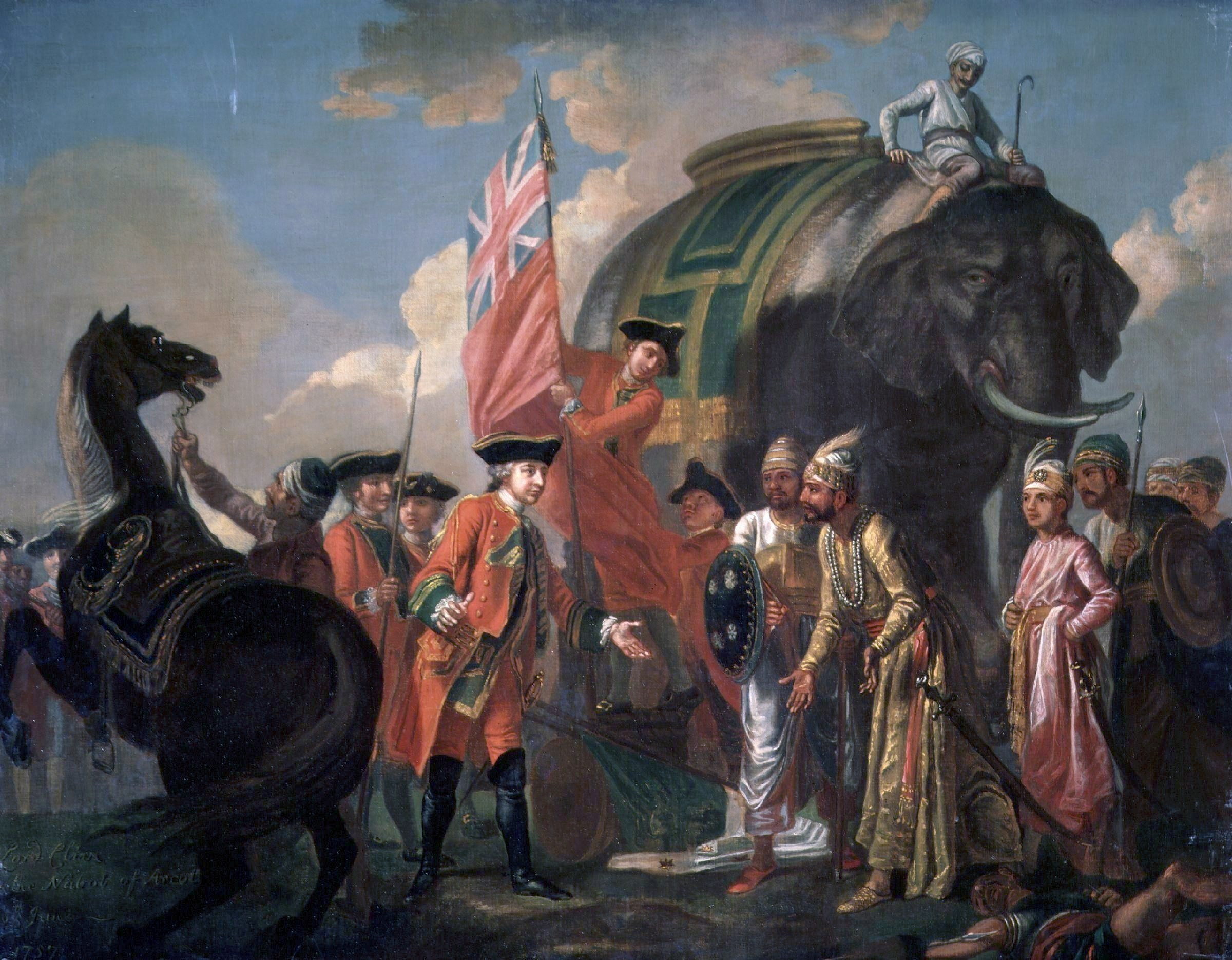
Mir Jafar defected to the British during the Battle of Plassey, being made the new nawab of Bengal as a reward.

- Khandesh war of succession (1508–1509), after the death of Sultan Ghazni Khan of the Farooqi dynasty (Sultanate of Khandesh).
- Idar war of succession (1515–1520), between Bharmal and Raimal over the throne of Idar.
- Trần Cao rebellion (1516–1521), after the deposition of emperor Lê Tương Dực of the Lê dynasty of Đại Việt by the spring of 1516 military coup
- Northern Yuan war of succession (1517–15??), after the death of Khagan Dayan Khan of the Northern Yuan dynasty
- Negara Daha war of succession (c. 1520), between Suriansyah of Banjar (alias Prince Samudera) and his uncle Pangeran Tumenggung
- Crisis of the Sixteenth Century (1521–1597), after the overthrow and murder of king Vijayabahu VI of Kotte during the Vijayabā Kollaya. The three sons of his first wife had conspired to kill him to prevent his designated heir, their stepbrother from his second wife, to ascend to the throne. Although they managed to kill their father, they soon began fighting each other over the division of the kingdom of Kotte into three parts. At the same time, the Kingdom of Kandy seized the opportunity to reassert its independence. The Portuguese began intervening in the war in the 1540s in pursuit of commercial concessions and ultimately inherited the reunited Kingdom of Kotte (excluding Kandy) in 1597.
- Gujarati war of succession (1526–1527), after the death of sultan Muzaffar Shah II of the Gujarat Sultanate
- Lê–Mạc War (1527/33–1592), after the deposition and execution of puppet-emperor Lê Cung Hoàng by general Mạc Đăng Dung, who proclaimed himself the emperor of his own new Mạc dynasty. Lê dynasty loyalists revolted, and in 1533 enthroned Lê Trang Tông.
- Hanakura Rebellion (1536), after the death of daimyo Imagawa Ujiteru of the Imagawa clan (controlling the Suruga Province of Japan)
- Mughal war of succession (1540–1552), between the brothers Humayun and Kamran Mirza about the succession of their already 10 years earlier deceased father, emperor Babur of the Mughal Empire
- Burmese–Siamese War (1547–1549), after the death of king Chairachathirat of Ayutthaya, followed by a succession crisis involving two coups and royal assassinations of kings Yotfa and Worawongsathirat
- Safavid war of succession (1576–1578), after the death of Shah Tahmasp I of Persia
- Mughal war of succession (1601–1605), in advance of the death of emperor Akbar of the Mughal Empire
- Siamese war of succession (1610–1611), after the death (murder?) of king Ekathotsarot of the Ayutthaya Kingdom
- Karnataka war of succession (1614–1617), after the death of emperor Venkatapati Raya of the Vijayanagara Empire
- Jaffna war of succession (1617–1621; last phase of the Portuguese conquest of the Jaffna kingdom), after the death of king Ethirimana Cinkam (Parasasekaran VIII) of the Jaffna Kingdom
- Mughal war of succession (1627–1628), after the death of emperor Nuruddin Salim Jahangir of the Mughal Empire
- Siamese war of succession (1628–1629), after the death of King Songtham of the Ayutthaya Kingdom
- Mataram war of succession (1645–1648), after the sudden death of Sultan Agung of Mataram. To prevent succession disputes from challenging his legitimacy, Agung's son Amangkurat I (crowned with heavy military security in 1646) launched many pre-emptive strikes (assassinations, massacres and battles) to eliminate potential rivals to the throne, including many noblemen and military leaders such as Tumenggung Wiraguna and his whole family (1647). This led his younger brother, Prince Alit (patron of the Wiraguna family), to attempt to overthrow him by attacking the royal palace with the support of Islamic clerics (ulema) and devout Muslims in 1648. Still, they were defeated, and Alit was slain in battle. Two days later, Amangkurat I committed a Massacre of the ulema and their families (about 5,000–6,000 people) to secure his reign.
- Mughal war of succession (1657–1661), after grave illness of emperor Shah Jahan of the Mughal Empire. Scholars disagree about whether to label this conflict a 'war of succession' or a '(princely) rebellion'. (Note: Faruqui (2012) decided 'not to count the conflict between Aurangzeb and his brothers (1657–9) as a rebellion. This is an arguable choice since the conflict started as a rebellion against Shah Jahan but then morphed into a succession struggle once Shah Jahan had been forced to abdicate his throne in the summer of 1658.' He regarded it as a 'war of succession' and noted that S. M. Azizuddin Husain (2002) had characterized it as a 'rebellion'.)
- Brunei Civil War (1660–1673), after the killing of Sultan Muhammad Ali of the Bruneian Sultanate by Abdul Hakkul Mubin, who seized the throne
- Tungning war of succession (1662), after the death of king Koxinga of the Kingdom of Tungning
- During the Trunajaya rebellion (1674–1681), Sultan Amangkurat I of Mataram died in 1677, causing a war of succession between his sons Rahmat (Amangkurat II) and Puger (Pakubuwono I)
- Laotian wars of succession (1694–1707/1713), after the death of king Sourigna Vongsa of Lan Xang
- The Javanese Wars of Succession (1703–1755), between local pretenders and candidates of the Dutch East India Company for the Sultanate of Mataram on Java
  - First Javanese War of Succession (1703–1708), after the death of Sultan Amangkurat II of Mataram, between his son Amangkurat III of Mataram and his brother Puger (Pakubuwono I)
  - Second Javanese War of Succession (1719–1722)
  - Third Javanese War of Succession (1749–1755)
- Sikkimese War of Succession (c. 1699–1708), after the death of chogyal Tensung Namgyal of the Kingdom of Sikkim
- Mughal war of succession (1707–1709), after the death of emperor Aurangzeb of the Mughal Empire
- Mughal war of succession (1712–1720), after the death of emperor Bahadur Shah I of the Mughal Empire
- Marava War of Succession (1720–1729), after the death of Raja Raghunatha Kilavan of the Ramnad estate
- Persian or Iranian Wars of Succession (1725–1796)
  - Safavid war of succession (1725–1729), after a Hotak invasion and the imprisonment of Shah Sultan Husayn of Safavid Persia
  - Afsharid war of succession (1747–1757), after the death of Shah Nadir Shah of Afsharid Persia
  - Zand War of Succession (1779–1796), after the death of Karim Khan of Zand Persia
- Carnatic Wars (1744–1763), territorial and succession wars between several local, nominally independent princes in the Carnatic, in which the British East India Company and French East India Company mingled
  - First Carnatic War (1744–1748), part of the War of the Austrian Succession between, amongst others, France on the one hand, and Britain on the other
  - Second Carnatic War (1749–1754), about the succession of both the nizam of Hyderabad and the nawab of Arcot
  - Third Carnatic War (nl) (1756–1763), after the death of nawab Alivardi Khan of Bengal; part of the global Seven Years' War between amongst others France on the one hand and Britain on the other
- Maratha war of succession (1749–1752), after the death of Maharaja Shahu I of the Maratha Empire
- Burmese war of succession (1760–1762), after the death of king Alaungpaya of the Konbaung dynasty
- War of the Sumbawan Succession (1761/2–1765), after the deposition of sultana I Sugiratu Karaeng Bontoparang (alias Sultanah Siti Aisyah, the wife of sultan Qahar-al-Din, who died in 1758) of the Sumbawa Sultanate. The war raged between the newly council-elected sultan Hasan al-Din (alias Hasanuddin, the Datu of Jarewe) and the council chief the Nene Rangan on the one hand (later supported by Balinese troops from Lombok), and Muhammad Jalaluddin Shah II (the Datu of Taliwang) and Mille Ropia on the other hand (later supported by Dutch East India Company (VOC) forces). The VOC defeated and captured Hasan al-Din and installed Jalaluddin as the new sultan in February 1764, but upon gathering more information decided that Hasan al-Din was the rightful sultan after all, and reinstalled him.
- Anglo-Maratha Wars (1775–1819): wars of succession between peshwas, in which the British intervened, and conquered the Maratha Empire
  - First Anglo-Maratha War (1775–1782), after the death of peshwa Madhavrao I; pretender Raghunath Rao invoked British help, but lost
  - Second Anglo-Maratha War (1803–1805), pretender Baji Rao II, son of Raghunath Rao, triumphed with British help and became peshwa, but had to surrender much power and territory to the British
  - Third Anglo-Maratha War, also Pindari War (1816–1819), peshwa Baji Rao II revolted against the British in vain; the Maratha Empire was annexed

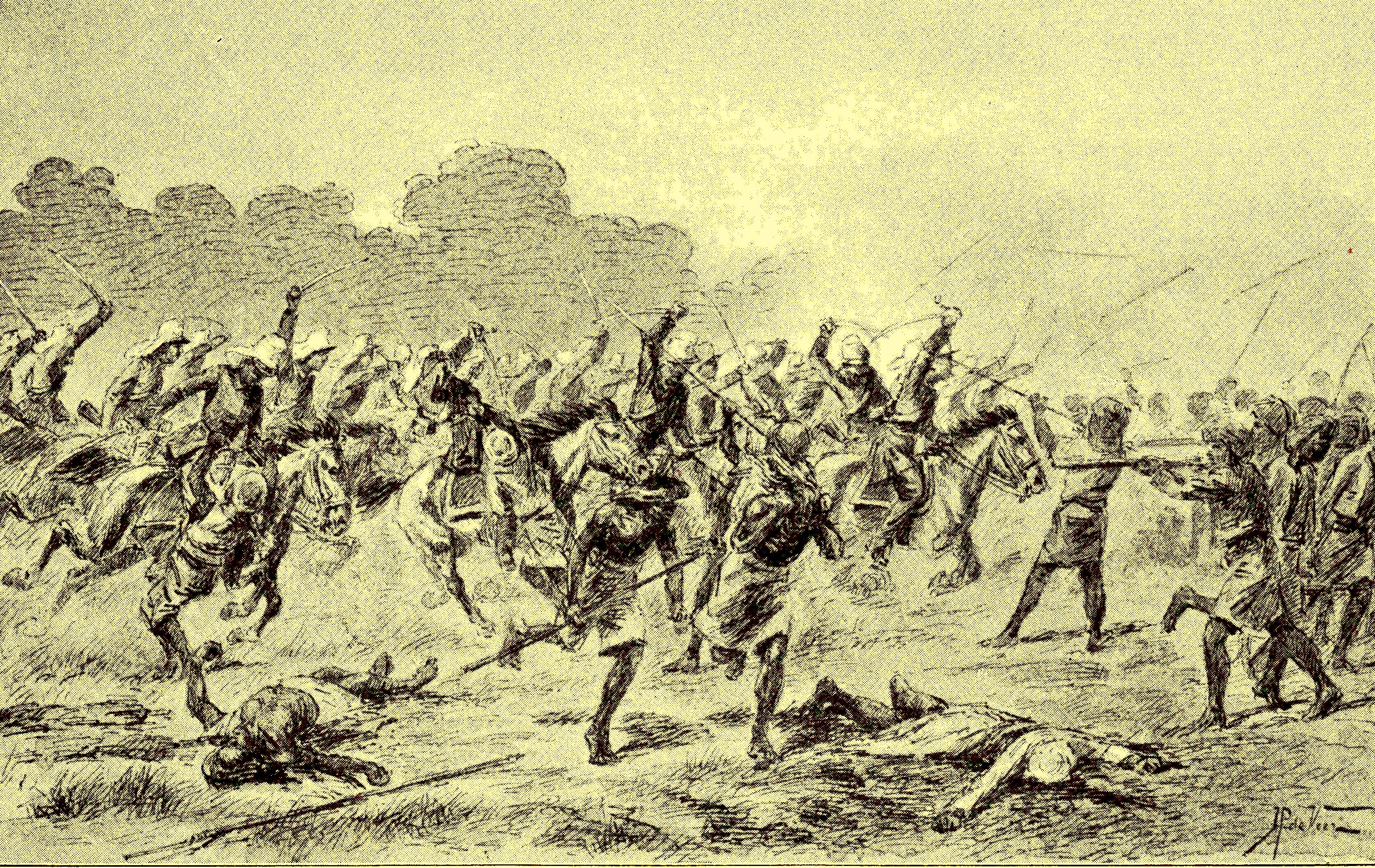
Dutch cavalry charge during the 1859 Bone Expedition on Sulawesi.

- Banjarmasin war of succession (1785–1787), after the death of Sultan Tahhmid Illah I of the Sultanate of Banjar(masin). The Dutch East India Company (VOC) intervened in 1786 in favour of Pangeran Nat(t)a (known by many other names), and upon victory he had to cede part of his territory to the VOC.
- Kurnool war of succession (1792–?), after the death of nawab Ranmust Khan of Kurnool between his sons Azim Khan (supported by the Nizam of Hyderabad) and Alif Khan (supported by the Sultan of Mysore)

=== Modern Asia ===
- Afghan Wars of Succession (1793–1834?), after the death of emir Timur Shah Durrani of Afghanistan
- First Anglo-Afghan War (1839–1842), British–Indian invasion of Afghanistan under the pretext of restoring the deposed emir Shah Shujah Durrani
- Pahang Civil War (1857–1863), after the death of Raja Tun Ali of Pahang
- Later Afghan War of Succession (1865–1870), after the death of emir Dost Mohammed Khan of Afghanistan
- The Dutch East Indies Army's 1859–1860 Bone Expeditions dealt with a war of succession in the Sulawesi kingdom of Bone
  - In the Second Bone War (1858–1860), the Dutch supported pretender Ahmad Sinkkaru' Rukka against queen Besse Arung Kajuara after the death of her husband, king Aru Pugi
- The Banjarmasin War (1859–1863), after the death of Sultan Adam. The Dutch supported pretender Tamjid Illah against pretender Hidayat Ullah; the latter surrendered in 1862.
- Third and Fourth Larut Wars (1871–1874), after the death of Sultan Ali (r. 1865–1871) of Perak
- Nauruan Civil War (1878–1888), after the crown chief was fatally shot during a heated discussion, shattering the existing federation of tribes and triggering a war between two tribal factions

== Europe ==
- British Isles
- Scandinavia, Baltics & Eastern Europe
- Low Countries
- Central Europe (HRE)
- France & Italy
- Spain & Portugal
- Southeastern Europe

== Americas ==
- Andean conflict
- Mesoamerican conflict
- Hawaiian conflict
- European intercolonial conflict
- (uncertain) Yaxchilan interregnum (742–752), between the death of Itzamnaaj Bahlam (Shield Jaguar) III and the accession of Yaxun Bʼalam (Bird Jaguar) IV. There is some evidence to suggest there was a struggle for the throne of Yaxchilan in this decade between Bird Jaguar and an unnamed pretender backed by Piedras Negras, compelling Bird Jaguar to construct an unusual amount of monuments to affirm his legitimacy and dynastic ties during his reign. Alternatively, there may have been a regency of Lady Eveningstar in this period after her husband Shield Jaguar died and before her son Bird Jaguar succeeded.
- Tepanec War (1426–1428), after the death of king Tezozomoc of Azcapotzalco; this led to the formation of the anti-Tepanec Triple Alliance, better known as the Aztec Empire
- Cusco war of succession (1438), after Viracocha Inca and designated heir Inca Urco (Urca, Urqu) fled during the Chanka invasion of the Kingdom of Cusco. Viracocha's other son Pachacuti successfully defended the city. He practically seized control of the kingdom, but upon Viracocha and Urco's return, a battle broke out over the succession, in which Urco was killed and Viracocha expelled, dying in exile in Calas shortly thereafter. Pachacuti's accession is regarded as the start of the Inca Empire.
- War of the Two Brothers, or Inca Civil War (1529–1532), after the death of emperor Huayna Capac of the Inca Empire
- King William's War (1688–1697), North American theatre of the Nine Years' War
- Queen Anne's War (1702–1713), North American theatre of the War of the Spanish Succession
- War of Jenkins' Ear (1739–1748), a pre-existing Anglo-Spanish conflict in the Americas, subsumed into the War of the Austrian Succession
- King George's War (1746–1748), North American theatre of the War of the Austrian Succession
- Hawaiian war of succession (1782), after the death of king Kalaniʻōpuʻu of Hawaii

== See also ==
- Ottoman dynasty § Succession practices (including royal fratricide)
- Political mutilation in Byzantine culture

== Bibliography ==
- Baker, Chris; Phongpaichit, Pasuk (2017). A History of Ayutthaya. Cambridge: Cambridge University Press. p. 158. ISBN 9781107190764.
- Baocheng, Zie (2013). A Brief History of the Official System in China. Beijing: Paths International Ltd. p. 232. ISBN 9781844641536.
- Black, Antony (2011). History of Islamic Political Thought. Second Edition. Edinburgh: Edinburgh University Press. pp. 15–17, 330–331. ISBN 9780748688784.
- Braumoeller, Bear F. (2019). Only the Dead: The Persistence of War in the Modern Age. Oxford: Oxford University Press. p. 288. ISBN 9780190849542.
- Coquery-Vidrovitch, Catherine (1988). Africa: Endurance and Change South of the Sahara. Translated by David Maisel. Berkeley, California: University of California Press. p. 403. ISBN 9780520078819.
- de Crespigny, Rafe (2007). A biographical dictionary of Later Han to the Three Kingdoms (23–220 AD). Leiden: Brill. ISBN 978-90-04-15605-0.
- Dillon, Michael (2016). Encyclopedia of Chinese History. Abingdon: Routledge. p. 872. ISBN 9781317817161.
- "(various entries)". Encarta Encyclopedie Winkler Prins (in Dutch). Microsoft Corporation/Het Spectrum. 1993–2002.
- Fage, J. D.; Oliver, Roland (1975a). The Cambridge History of Africa: Volume 4. From c. 1600 to c. 1790. Cambridge: Cambridge University Press. p. 752. ISBN 9780521204132.
- Fage, J. D.; Flint, John Edgar; Oliver, Roland (1975b). The Cambridge History of Africa: Volume 5. From c. 1790 to c. 1870. Cambridge: Cambridge University Press. ISBN 9780521207010.
- Faruqui, Munis Daniyal (2002). "Princes and power in the Mughal Empire, 1569–1657". ProQuest Dissertations Publishing. Duke University.
- Faruqui, Munis D. (2012). The Princes of the Mughal Empire, 1504–1719. Cambridge: Cambridge University Press. pp. 181–234. ISBN 9781139536752. doi:10.1017/CBO9781139135474.009
- Flint, Lawrence S. (2005). Historical constructions of postcolonial citizenship and subjectivity: the case of the Lozi peoples of southern central Africa (PDF). Birmingham: University of Birmingham. p. 311.
- Gillespie, Alexander (2013). The Causes of War. Volume 1: 3000 BCE to 1000 CE. Oxford: Bloomsbury Publishing. ISBN 9781782252085.
- Hanne, Eric J. (2007). Putting the Caliph in His Place: Power, Authority, and the Late Abbasid Caliphate. Madison: Fairleigh Dickinson Univ Press. pp. 58–65. ISBN 9780838641132.
- Higham, Charles (2004). Encyclopedia of Ancient Asian Civilizations. Infobase. p. 412.
- Holsti, Kalevi (1991). Peace and War: Armed Conflicts and International Order, 1648–1989. Cambridge: Cambridge University Press. p. 379. ISBN 9780521399296.
- Jaques, Tony (2007). Dictionary of Battles and Sieges: F-O. Santa Barbara: Greenwood Publishing Group. ISBN 9780313335389.
- Kohn, George Childs (2013). Dictionary of Wars. Revised Edition. Londen/New York: Routledge. ISBN 9781135954949.
- Oliver, Roland (1977). The Cambridge History of Africa: Volume 3. c. 1050 – c. 1600. Cambridge: Cambridge University Press. p. 803. ISBN 9780521209816.
- Kokkonen, Andrej; Sundell, Anders (May 2014). "Delivering Stability—Primogeniture and Autocratic Survival in European Monarchies 1000–1800". American Political Science Review. 108 (2). American Political Science Association: 438–453. doi:10.1017/S000305541400015X. hdl:2077/38982. S2CID 53132563.
- Kokkonen, Andrej; Sundell, Anders (September 2017). "The King is Dead: Political Succession and War in Europe, 1000–1799" (PDF). Qog Working Paper Series. Gothenburg: University of Gothenburg: 51. ISSN 1653-8919.
  - (Appendix) Kokkonen, Andrej; Sundell, Anders (September 2017). Online supplementary appendix for "The King is Dead: Political Succession and War in Europe, 1000–1799" (PDF). Gothenburg: University of Gothenburg. p. 40.
- Kurrild-Klitgaard, Peter (2000). "The constitutional economics of autocratic succession". Public Choice. 103 (1/2): 63–84. doi:10.1023/A:1005078532251. ISSN 0048-5829. S2CID 154097838.
- Kurrild-Klitgaard, Peter (2004). "Autocratic succession". Encyclopedia of Public Choice. 103: 358–362. doi:10.1007/978-0-306-47828-4_39. ISBN 978-0-306-47828-4.
- Lange, D. (1984). Africa from the Twelfth to the Sixteenth Century. Berkeley, California: UNESCO. p. 263. ISBN 9789231017100.
- Luard, Evan (1992). "Succession". The Balance of Power. London: Palgrave Macmillan. pp. 149–150. doi:10.1007/978-1-349-21927-8_6. ISBN 978-1-349-21929-2.
- Mikaberidze, Alexander, ed. (2011). Conflict and Conquest in the Islamic World: A Historical Encyclopedia, Volume 1. Santa Barbara: ABC-CLIO. ISBN 9781598843361.
- Moore, Robert I. (2000). "Sex and the Social Order". The First European Revolution: 970–1215. Oxford: Wiley-Blackwell. pp. 65–111. ISBN 9780631222774.
- Nolan, Cathal J. (2006). The Age of Wars of Religion, 1000–1650: An Encyclopedia of Global Warfare and Civilization, Volume 2. London: Greenwood Publishing Group. p. 1076. ISBN 978-0313337345.
- Nolan, Cathal J. (2008). Wars of the Age of Louis XIV, 1650–1715: An Encyclopedia of Global Warfare and Civilization: An Encyclopedia of Global Warfare and Civilization. London: Greenwood Press. p. 214. ISBN 9780313359200.
- Ooi, Keat Gin (2004). Southeast Asia: A Historical Encyclopedia, from Angkor Wat to East Timor. ABC-CLIO. p. 1791. ISBN 9781576077702.
- Otunnu, Ogenga (2016). Crisis of Legitimacy and Political Violence in Uganda, 1890 to 1979. Cham, Switzerland: Springer. p. 369. ISBN 9783319331560.
- Reuter, Timothy (1995). The New Cambridge Medieval History: Volume 3, c.900–c.1024. Cambridge: Cambridge University Press. p. 891. ISBN 9780521364478.
- Sandberg, Brian (2016). War and Conflict in the Early Modern World: 1500–1700. Cambridge: Polity Press. p. 284. ISBN 9781509503025.
- Tarling, Nicholas (1992). The Cambridge History of Southeast Asia: From early times to c. 1800. Cambridge: Cambridge University Press. p. 706. ISBN 9780521355056.
