= Setlutlu =

Spouse of the Kololo people's chief

- Other name: Masekeletu
- Title: Queen consort of the Makololo tribe
- Spouse: King Sebetwane
- Children: King Sekeletu
- Relatives: Prince Litali (grandson)

Setlutlu, or Masekeletu, (fl. c. 1836 CE - c. 1855 CE) was the spouse of Sebetwane — a chief of the Kololo people.

Her brother-in-law was King Mbololo.

== Biography ==
Setlutlu was not Kololo by birth; she may have been Batlokoa, or Phuthing. She had been captured during war, and Sebetwane, the Kololo ruler, originally awarded Setlutlu to Lechae, one of his young commanders, to serve as his wife. Later, Sebetwane took her for himself, and married her.

They had a son, Sekeletu, who later became a ruler, after the death of Sebetwane, and the abdication of Sebetwane's daughter - and chosen successor - Mamochisane. There was debate, however, over whether Sekeletu was a legitimate son of Sebetwane, or whether he should rightly be considered a son of Lechae. Nonetheless, at age 18, he was appointed ruler.

David Livingstone met and interacted with Setlutlu on many occasions, and frequently mentioned her in his accounts of his travels. By this time she was married once again, to a man named Mamire. The town she lived in was simply known by her name. She evidently held much influence over the commanders that Sibituane left, and wielded power. For instance, in c. 1854, she assisted David Livingstone by outspokenly supporting his request to Mpolo to free a number of captives. Livingstone himself admiringly commented on her "good sense". Setlutlu was a grandmother of Princes Litali and Sesane.

== Literature ==
- Makololo interregnum and the legacy of David Livingstone (PDF)
