= Makololo Chiefs (Malawi) =

Chiefs of the Kololo people

The Makololo chiefs recognised by the governments of colonial Nyasaland and independent Malawi have their origin in a group of porters that David Livingstone brought from Barotseland in the 1850s to support his first Zambezi expedition that did not return to Barotseland but assisted Livingstone and British missionaries in the area of southern Malawi between 1859 and 1864. After the withdrawal of the Universities' Mission to Central Africa those Makololo remaining in the Shire valley used firearms provided by the Europeans to attract dependants seeking protection, to seize land and to establish a number of chieftainships. At the time that a British protectorate was established in 1891, there were seven Makololo chiefs of which six were recognised by the government. Five survived to be given local governmental powers in 1933, and these powers continued after Malawi became independent. Although called Makololo or Kololo, after the ruling group in Barotseland in the 1850s, the majority came from peoples subject to the Makololo who adopted the more prestigious name. As, regardless of their origin, they took wives from among the inhabitants of the Shire Valley, their modern descendants have little connection with the Kololo people apart from their name.

== Makololo arrival in Malawi ==
The missionary activities of David Livingstone in Botswana for the London Missionary Society effectively ended in 1851 when he left Kolobeng Mission after failing to convert more than a few local people. During his last two years at Kolobeng, Livingstone had made three journeys well to the north of the mission which convinced him that the successful evangelisation of the interior of Africa would be achieved through exploring and mapping its navigable rivers as highways for missionaries and traders to enter the continental interior. Between 1852 and 1856, Livingstone mapped most of the course of the Zambezi, and made a transcontinental journey from Luanda on the Atlantic to Quelimane on the Indian Ocean between 1854 and 1856.

This journey was accomplished with the help of 27 Africans provided as porters by Sekeletu, the King of Barotseland and chief of the Makololo or Kololo people, which had conquered Barotseland in the previous decade, for the passage from Luanda to Linyanti, now in Namibia, and later with 114 men from the same source for the journey from Linyanti to Quelimane. From Sekeletu's perspective, establishing a secure route to the Atlantic or Indian Ocean, rather than relying on the dangerous and insecure one southward to the Cape Colony was well worth the loan of these men and they contributed significantly to Livingstone's success. Although, following the name Livingstone gave them, these men are conventionally called "Makololo" after the ruling group in Barotseland, most of them probably belonged to the Lozi people or other subject peoples of Sekeletu's kingdom that inhabited the Caprivi Strip around Linyanti, and who were usually described as Makalaka. Around 100 of these men were left at Tete in 1856 when Livingstone made his way to Quelimane and then to Britain. The local governor at Tete oversaw their welfare and they hunted elephant and cultivated land to support themselves there.

Although on one level, the individuals involved were working for both Sekeletu's and Livingstone's goals, those that the Makololo contemptuously dismissed as Makalaka, vassals or serfs, saw the expedition as a way to gain, wealth, authority, and power that their social position denied them in their homeland. The Makololo conquest had been completed barely a decade before Livingstone's arrival and the senior Makololo indunas had gained control of the traditional sources of the country's wealth, making emigration or association with new sources of wealth the Europeans promised and the firearms that they provided the best options for the young men of the subject populations seeking advancement.

After he had completed his first Zambezi expedition, the London Missionary Society told Livingstone it was unable to support him in exploration rather than missionary work, and he resigned from the society in 1857. Livingstone's second Zambezi expedition that started in 1858 was diverted up the Shire River in January 1859 after it was found that the Zambezi was not navigable beyond the Cabora Bassa rapids, which he had bypassed on his first expedition. On reaching Tete, he was reunited with the porters he had left there in 1856 and attempted to repatriate them all to Barotseland. However, by this time Sekeletu was facing increasing opposition from the Lozi majority, and a number of porters decided to remain on the middle Zambezi. These included two Makololo who had a superior status and their servants, the remainder being porters or canoemen from the subject peoples, and there were either 15 or 16 of them. They were used from 1859 onward, first by Livingstone and then by missionaries of the Universities' Mission to Central Africa (UMCA), as porters and armed guards to support their activities in the Shire valley and Shire Highlands including the freeing of slaves, and were paid in guns, ammunition and cloth. In 1861, after the original UMCA mission site at Magomero in the Shire Highlands was abandoned, the Makololo relocated with the missionaries to the Shire valley, from where the missionaries withdrew in January 1864. The Makololo decided to remain.

== Formation of chiefdoms ==
What is now southern Malawi was relatively peaceful, prosperous and densely populated by the Mang'anja people at the time of Livingstone's first visit in early 1859, but was about to become the focus of disruption caused by the large-scale migration of Yao people. The early Yao migrations from the 1830s involved few people and were relatively peaceful but, whether forced out of their earlier territory in Mozambique by the Makua people, by famine, by slave traders, by internal Yao conflicts or some combination of these, larger numbers of Yao moved, firstly, into the Niassa Province of Mozambique east of Lake Nyasa and then into the Shire Highlands in the 1850s. These incursions disrupted agriculture and caused widespread famine in the Shire Highland in the early 1860s as the local people abandoned their farms.

The Mang'anja were one of the Maravi cluster of peoples who moved into the Lower Zambezi and Lower Shire river valleys before the end of 16th century and coalesced into a number of loosely connected chieftainships which, under pressure from the Portuguese in the Lower Zambezi valley, recognised paramount chiefs with the titles of Lundu, Kalonga and Kaphwiti. These paramount chiefs derived some of their prestige through guardianship of the main shrines of the M'Bona Cult, and the Lundu kingdom, which included most of the Mang'anja people, controlled the main M'Bona shrine until the early 19th century. At that time, pressure from supposedly subordinate chiefs controlling other shrines and attacks from Afro-Portuguese chikunda raiding for slaves left the Lundu state with little real power over what had become a loose confederation of local chiefdoms.

In the early 1860s, members of Livingstone's expedition or UCMA missionaries described the Mang'anja as being ruled by a hierarchy of chiefs and headmen of varying power and influence. In theory, the Lundu was still the paramount ruler with the power to appoint local chiefs, but his influence was limited. Several major chiefs within the Lundu sphere had more real power than the Lundu himself, although their inability to defend their people against attacks by the Yao and chikunda was beginning to reduce their prestige. As a result of those attacks, some of the Mang'anja in the Shire Highlands were killed or exported as slaves to the Indian Ocean coast, others died of famine or famine-related disease and yet others fled to the Shire valley or the uplands beyond. The loss of population in the Shire Highlands was very great, and much land went out of cultivation and reverted to forest. Even thirty years later at the start of the colonial period, large areas of the Shire Highlands were underpopulated and remained so until the large-scale immigration of Lomwe people fleeing famine and forced labour in Mozambique at the end of the 19th century. Those Mang'anja remaining in the Shire Highlands were either slave wives or domestic slaves in Yao households or occupied defensible hilltops and inaccessible lakeshores.

Once the Makololo had relocated to the Shire valley, they maintained themselves through hunting elephants for ivory and attracted Mang'anja dependents seeking protection, many of whom were slaves liberated from slave caravans who had lost contact with their original homes. The freed women became polygamous wives of the Makololo and the men cultivated farmland seized from its original inhabitants. After the 1864 departure of the UMCA mission, which left behind supplies of arms, munitions and trade goods, the Makololo and their armed dependents attacked local Mang'anja chiefs and established chieftaincies in the present-day Chikwawa District. Graham-Jolly records the names of 16 original Makololo, but nothing is known of six of them beyond their names, and they were probably absorbed into the local population, losing their Makololo identity. The other ten became chiefs or headmen: two of these, Kasisi and Mloka, were said to be true Makololo rather than coming from subject peoples, and these were the first leaders of the group. The chiefs or headmen that were not originally Makololo soon also adopted what they considered the more prestigious, if fictitious, name of Makololo.

The Mang'anja put up little resistance to Kasisi, Mloka and their men and, apart from the deaths of the Lundu and Kaphwiti paramounts and a few followers, the takeover was relatively bloodless. Some Mang'anja chiefs were willing to cooperate with the Makololo against other Mang'anja who were their enemies, whereas the Makololo remained united among themselves and determined to build up their power. At first, Kasisi and Mloka divided the land they had occupied between them, with Kasisi as senior ruler. Kasisi enjoyed reasonably good relations with the Yao which, together with his guns, kept him and his dependents safe from Yao attacks. The Makololo were also some distance away from two other potential enemies. The more powerful and active were the Maseko Ngoni in present-day Ntcheu District, and Kasisi set up fortified villages at fords along the Shire River as protection against Ngoni raids. Several Makololo and some of their Mang'anja dependents were installed as headmen in these villages and, on the death of Mloka, Kasisi divided his former territory between three of the original Makololo. Until the death of their leader, Paul Marianno II in 1863, the Afro-Portuguese chikunda had considerable power and influence in the Lower Shire valley. However, as Marianno's son was then only 8 years old, he required a long minority, during which there were power struggles between the child's mother, his aunt and a prominent chikunda leader, which made it difficult to resist growing power of the Makololo, and the chikunda retreated further down the Shire.

== Later history ==
The territories of the two largest Makololo chiefdoms were each about 1,300 square kilometres (500 sq mi) in extent, the others being smaller. Between the 1870s and 1910s, the original ten Makololo that became chiefs or headmen died and several of their lines of descent died out or merged with others, so that there were seven Makololo chiefs in 1891. Since 1888, the most powerful of these was Mlauri, who tried to use the position of his village on a hill above the Shire River to dominate traffic on the river in the 1880s and impose tolls on European steamers using it. He became increasingly hostile to both British and Portuguese influences and, in 1889, he attacked a Portuguese military force under Major Alexandre de Serpa Pinto and was severely defeated, later fleeing from his village. As he had previously shown hostility to British as well as Portuguese forces, the British government did nothing to restore him and declined to recognise him as a chief. Mlauri was never restored although he lived until 1913. The other six Makololo chiefs were recognised, and five of their chiefdoms survived to be recognised as a Native Authority by the Nyasaland government in 1933 under the policy of Indirect rule, their titles were Kasisi, Makwira, Katunga, Masea and Mwita.

Apart from Mlauri, most of the Makololo chiefs valued their former connection with Livingstone and were favourably disposed to British missionaries and traders entering their area. They traded ivory in exchange for guns, ammunition and trade goods from the 1870s until a protectorate was established by John Buchanan in 1889 and extended into the British Central Africa Protectorate in 1891. The Makololo had a virtual monopoly over the collection of ivory in the lower Shire valley, which they sold to the African Lakes Company as they were unable to use the Shire-Zambezi route to the coast through Portuguese territory. There was a certain amount of friction between the Makololo and the African Lakes Company by the mid-1880s, because the company was unwilling to supply them with firearms and ammunition, which it did supply to independent African hunters competing with the Makololo. The Makololo in turn tried to bypass the company by trading with independent European traders, until one of these killed a Makololo chief in a dispute over trade goods and was in turn killed by the chief's men.

Relations with the Portuguese were difficult because they controlled the main access route to the coast and also laid claim to the Shire valley and Shire Highlands. The guardians of the young Paul Marianno III had been forced to withdraw south of the Ruo River on the eastern bank of the Shire, and their power on the western bank of the Shire virtually ended. In an attempt to regain these lost territories, an alliance of the prazeros of the middle Zambezi attacked the Makololo and were heavily defeated in 1877. In the same year and until 1881, the Makololo chiefs attacked the prazos of Marianno III and his allies, which were in areas of Portuguese jurisdiction. Fears that the Makololo were part of a British attempt, also including the Scottish missions and African Lakes Corporation, to claim the areas attacked persuaded the Portuguese government to reinforce its claims to the area by sending a number of expeditions there. As a result, the Scottish missionaries in Blantyre protested to the British government, asking it to oppose any Portuguese claim to the Shire Highlands. After Serpa Pinto's battles with Mlauri, Serpa Pinto's second-in-command took two armed steamboats up the Shire River to overawe the Makololo and some of their chiefs fled to the European settlement of Blantyre for safety, provoking the declaration of a British protectorate over the disputed area.

The first two colonial administrators of the British Central Africa Protectorate, Harry Johnstone and Alfred Sharpe, did not wish to involve African chiefs in the governance of the protectorate or to acknowledge their authority, but the small number of colonial officials in the protectorate and its poverty meant that many chiefs continued to exercise their traditional powers unofficially. As the administration did not recognise chiefs, it only removed those that had opposed them and made no attempt to replace Yao, Ngoni or Makololo chiefs that ruled people of different ethnicity. A government Ordinance of 1912 sanctioned the governmental appointment of Principal Headmen, with limited authority as government agents in their areas. Most were prominent local chiefs, including six Makololo chiefs. In 1933, a form of Indirect rule was introduced by the governor of Nyasaland, Sir Hubert Young, who appointed chiefs as local government officials with wider powers than in 1912, but with no jurisdiction over European-owned estates and no financial responsibilities. The Provincial Commissioner in the south of Nyasaland wished to deal with the anomaly that the five Makololo chiefs in Chikwawa District ruled over predominantly Mang'anja populations, whereas seven Mang'anja chiefs in the neighbouring Nsanje District had a majority of Sena immigrants as their subjects, but no changes were made.

The Native Authority scheme generally worked well until the mid-1940s, but in the post-Second World War period, most chiefs lost legitimacy by enforcing unpopular government policies. By the early 1950s, Indirect rule was barely operating in many areas and the political initiative had passed to the Nyasaland African Congress. However, after the country gained independence as Malawi in 1964, the Malawian government halted the decline of Indirect rule and, under the presidency of Hastings Banda, the chiefs, including the five Makololo chiefs, regained their lost status and became an essential part of the state apparatus.

== Sources ==
- N. R. Bennett, (1970). David Livingstone: Exploration for Christianity in R. I. Rotberg (editor), Africa and its Explorers. Harvard University Press.ISBN 978-0-67436-711-1.
- D. Cammack, E. Kanyongolo and T. O’Neil, (2009). Town Chiefs in Malawi: Africa Power and Politics Programme Working Paper No. 3. London, Department for Overseas Development.
- T. Jeal, (2013). Livingstone: Revised and Expanded Edition, Yale University Press.ISBN 978-0-30019-100-4.
- W. T. Kalusa, 2009. Elders, Young Men, and David Livingstone's "Civilizing Mission": Revisiting the Disintegration of the Kololo Kingdom, 1851-1864. The International Journal of African Historical Studies, Vol. 42, No. 1.
- J. McCracken, (2012). A History of Malawi, 1859–1966, Woodbridge, James Currey pp. 130–2. ISBN 978-1-84701-050-6.
- M. D. D. Newitt, (1970). The Massingire Rising of 1884, The Journal of African History, Vol. 11, No. 1.
- M. D. D. Newitt, (1982). The Early History of the Maravi, Journal of African History, Vol. 23, No. 3.
- N. Northrup,(1986). The Migrations of Yao and Kololo into Southern Malawi: Aspects of Migrations in Nineteenth Century Africa. The International Journal of African Historical Studies, Vol. 19, No. 1.
- B. Pachai, (1978). Land and Politics in Malawi 1875-1975, Kingston (Ontario), The Limestone Press. ISBN 0-91964-282-9.
- R. I. Rotberg, (1965). The Rise of Nationalism in Central Africa: The Making of Malawi and Zambia 1873–1964, Harvard University Press..ISBN 978-0-67477-191-8.
- M. Schoffeleers, (1972). The History and Political Role of the M'Bona Cult among the Mang'anja, in T. O. Ranger and I. N. Kimambo (editors), The Historical Study of African Religion. University of California Press. ISBN 0-52003-179-2.
- L. White, (1987). Magomero: Portrait of an African Village, Cambridge University Press. ISBN 0-521-32182-4.
