= Sipopa =

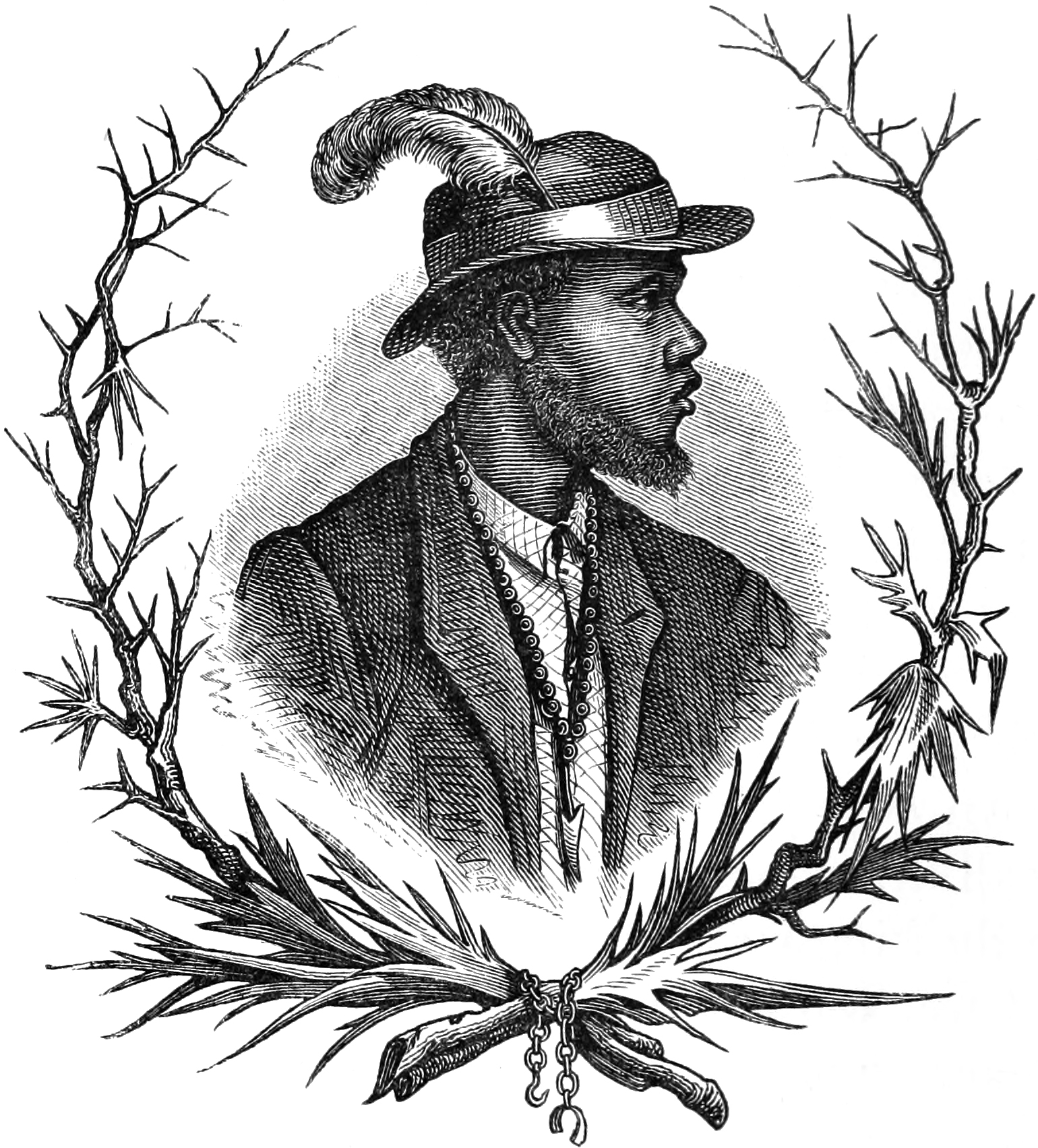
- King Sepopo portrayed in the book Seven Years in South Africa (1881)
- Other names: Lutangu
- Title: King of the Lozi people
- Predecessor: Mbololo
- Successor: Mowa Mamili
- Spouse: Mamochisane
- Children: daughter and many sons
- Parent: Mubukwanu
- Relatives: Kandundu (sister)

Sipopa Lutangu was the leader of the Lozi revolution and later a Litunga (king) of the Lozi people. He ruled from 1864 to 1876.

== Biography ==
Sipopa (also known as Lutangu) was the son of the former Lozi King, Mubukwanu. He was a successor of Mbololo, who was a very cruel king. Sipopa's reign started in 1864. Some Lozi contenders for power accused Sipopa of retaining the customs of the Makololo tribe (including the base of the language).

He took Queen Mamochisane for a wife. She was the daughter of Sebetwane and sister of Sekeletu, who was a leper. Mamochisane was widely respected throughout Barotseland and Sipopa could well have simply been following a tradition that Sekeletu had followed whereby, when a chief had died, the wife or wives of the deceased were inherited and cared for by the new chief.

His daughter married a surviving Makololo man by the name of Manengo. Sipopa had a sister called Kandundu and many sons:

columns

- Prince (Mwana' Mulena) Kaiba Natamoyo
- Prince (Mwana' Mulena) Mutumwenu
- Prince (Mwana' Mulena) Munalula
- Prince (Mwana' Mulena) Malitela
- Prince (Mwana' Mulena) Kaluwe
- Prince (Mwana' Mulena) Musiwa
- Prince (Mwana' Mulena) Notulo
- Prince (Mwana' Mulena) Simbotwe
- Prince (Mwana' Mulena) Nolianga
- Prince (Mwana' Mulena) Sishwati
- Prince (Mwana' Mulena) Mboo Fwabi
- Prince (Mwana' Mulena) Mwanagala
- Prince (Mwana' Mulena) Kabaenda
- Prince (Mwana' Mulena) Mando
- Prince (Mwana' Mulena) Monambeza
- Prince (Mwana' Mulena) Wamulimungwa
- Prince (Mwana' Mulena) Sepopa

His successor was Mowa Mamili.
