= Mbona cult =

The Mbona cult (also spelled M'Bona) is a system of religious beliefs and rituals which is currently restricted to the most southerly parts of Malawi, but which probably extended more widely, both in other parts of Malawi and adjacent parts of Mozambique. The cult is found mainly among the local Mang'anja people and its former extent reflected that people's wider past distribution. It aims to secure abundant rains at the appropriate season through the making of propitiatory gifts at cult shrines, and includes rainmaking rituals in the event of drought. It has been related to a number of other territorial cults among the Maravi cluster of related African peoples which aim to secure the well-being of the people of a particular area secure from drought, floods or food shortages. The cult is believed to be a long established one, although estimates of how long it has existed are speculative, as the earliest definite record of its existence dates from 1862.

There are a number of debates about the sect. The first is what the essential nature of M'Bona is, whether a natural spirit, a deified single human or combination of several such people, a priest or other human intermediary with a god or even the personification of the suffering of the conquered people, whether this identity has changed over time, and whether the name M'Bona has been applied to what were originally different entities in different places. The second is whether the current stories about M'Bona are myths, created to explain the cult after it was formed, oral traditions with possibly a much distorted factual basis or a form of oral history from which actual past events can be recovered. The third is about the exact historical role of the M'Bona cult and whether its ritual practices as recorded in the 20th centuries are a continuation of those of earlier times.

Much of the study of M'Bona was undertaken by Father Jan Matthew Schoffeleers (1928 – 2011), an anthropologist and researcher into African Religion, who was a Catholic missionary in the Lower Shire valley from 1955 to 1963 and then followed a largely academic career in Britain, Malawi and the Netherlands until his retirement in 1998. His extensive study of the cult began in the 1950s and he published eight books or papers on it between 1972 and 1992, besides two academic theses.

== Historical background ==
=== From early sources ===
A number of speculative reconstructions of the origin of the Maravi cluster of peoples suggest that they entered the area of central and southern Malawi in relatively small groups from the 14th century, and that the trade in ivory they developed with the Muslim traders based on the coast of Nampula and Zambezia provinces was central to the rise of centralised Maravi states in the late 16th and 17th centuries in an area they had long occupied. The later conflicts between these states. The political changes in the area between 1570 and 1640 were said to result from the disruption of that trade by the Portuguese, who had been excluded from that trade, and their African allies.

However, there is no documentary evidence for a Maravi movement into the Lower Zambezi and Lower Shire river valleys before the late 16th century, let alone their forming organised states in that area before the 1570s, or for any substantial ivory trade between that area and the coastal Muslims. The earliest European account of those river valleys and its people relates to an expedition of 1569, which places the Makua people along the Lower Zambezi valley and the related Lolo people around Tete, with no indication of powerful Maravi states in the area. According to a further account of 1590, the Makua had recently lost control of the south bank of the Zambezi and the Lolo had been displaced eastward: these two groups then occupied roughly the same area of Zambezia province as today. There are also several contemporary or near-contemporary accounts which indicate a Portuguese involvement in a rather limited Zambezi ivory trade in the mid-16th century, probably involving the Makua people rather than the Maravi.

Although these sources do not specifically name the invaders that displaced the Makua and Lolo, it seems that they came from the north and are plausibly interpreted as being Maravi and as forming the Lundu state, although the chiefly title of Lundu and the name Maravi are not recorded until 1616, and the title Kalonga, that of the most senior Maravi ruler, is recorded only from 1660. Rather than a Maravi empire being formed well to the north of the Zambezi and expanding southwards, as in several accounts, it is more probable that a number of related but rather small groups from north of the Zambezi entered Zambezia in the 16th century and coalesced into loosely connected Maravi chieftainships which were forced, when their further advance was prevented by the Portuguese, to recognise one or more paramount chiefs.

In the early 17th century, according to Portuguese accounts recorded in 1648, an individual named Muzura, who had worked for the Portuguese, established himself as the overlord of the Maravi chieftainships on the north bank of the Zambezi with Portuguese support in 1608, and he retained this position until around 1635, defeating an attempt of the Lundu chief to revolt in 1622. One theory is that Muzura's successors adopted the title of Kalonga and ruled what came to be called the Maravi Empire, including three other substantial kingdoms or paramount chieftainships: Lundu along the Lower Shire, Kaphwiti in the Shire Highlands and Undi to the west of the Shire valley, in the area of what is now the Mozambique-Zambia border. Another is that the Kalonga state, whose main seat is believed to have been south of Lake Malawi, already existed but did not take part in the expansion into Zambezia so was unknown to the Portuguese in the early 17th Century. In this reconstruction, Muzura formed a state in the Mwanza area of the mid-Shire valley, between Lundu and Kalonga, which Kalonga took over by on his death, only then gaining paramountcy over the three chieftainships to the south

The people of the Maravi cluster diversified over time to become, from north to south the Tumbuka, Chewa, Nyanja and Mang'anja, although these successors retained certain common beliefs.

=== Pre-colonial 19th century ===
At the end of the 18th century, the original Lundu kingdom among the Mang'anja people was based in the Lower Shire valley, but was vulnerable to aggression from Portuguese slave-traders. Over a half -century beginning in the early 19th century, an individual named Mankhokwe, who already controlled the Katchsi shrine in Thyolo District in the Shire Highlands, gained control of the Middle Shire and western Shire highlands He then claimed the paramountcy and title of Lundu, and attempted to gain control of the Khulubvi shrine. In the Lower Shire, another chief with the title Tengani built up a force able to resist the Portuguese threat, at least temporarily, and the original Lundu state and its title holder descended into obscurity.

The situation of the Mang'anja in the 1860s, as described by members of David Livingstone's expedition or the Universities' Mission to Central Africa, was that there was a hierarchy of chiefs and headmen of varying power and influence. Theoretically, the paramount chief with the title Lundu was at the apex of this hierarchy, his prestige deriving from his control of one or more rain shrines, but his power over other major chiefs was limited. In practice, Mankhokwe, the pretender to the Lundu title had more power than the hereditary title-holder. Senior chiefs controlling significant areas were in theory appointed by the paramount but they had followings in the areas they controlled and, in some cases, also controlled rain shrines: as the provision of rain was central to Mang'anja religion and daily life, being the patron of such a shrine was a source of significant power. The nature of one shrine was described in 1862, when it was claimed that the spirit of a former chief, M'Bona, communicated with a prophetess in dreams.

Although an Afro-Portuguese slave-trader, Paul Mariano II, managed to defeat Tengani, capture many slaves and destroy the Khulubvi shrine in 1862, Tengani survived with a reduced chiefdom and was later recognised by the colonial authorities as the senior Mang'anja chief. However some of the Kololo that Livingstone had brought from Botswana as porters for his Zambezi expedition, and left in the Shire Valley at the end of his expedition in 1864, established chieftainships along the Middle and Lower Shire valley outside Tengani's influence. Mankhokwe had to face Kololo pressure on the Middle Shire and Yao attacks in the Shire Highlands, so he and his people later migrated to the hills west of the Shire River, deserting the ancestral Mankhokwe rain shrine, which fell into disuse once its Mang'anja devotees had left the area. Paul Mariano II died in 1863 and was succeeded by his young son, Paul Mariano III. After Paul Mariano III reached adulthood, he reached an agreement with the Portuguese authorities in 1879 which left him in control of the Lower Shire Valley as far south as its confluence with the Zambezi, until a subsequent Portuguese governor attacked Mariano's stronghold in 1884-85, following which many of Mariano's chikunda, or native soldiers, moved into the area around the Khulubvi shrine, destroying villages and taking slaves until when, from 1889 onwards, first a Portuguese expedition led by Alexandre de Serpa Pinto and later a British one under Henry Hamilton Johnston entered the area to quell the disorder. The Lower Shire Valley was divided between the two powers by an 1891 Anglo-Portuguese treaty The British Central Africa Protectorate that was set up in 1891 protected the Mang'anja people from further attacks by Mariano's former chikunda or the Kololo chiefs of the Middle Shire, and the protectorate authorities later recognised Tengani as protector of the Khulubvi shrine.

== The M'Bona cult ==
=== The nature of M'Bona ===
The history of the M'Bona sect is closely bound up with that of the Mang'anja people, who currently live mainly in the north of Nsanje district and south of Chikwawa district in the Lower Shire valley of Malawi, and also in adjacent areas of Mozambique. However, before the migrations of the Yao and Lomwe into the north-western part of their former territory and the Sena in the south, all of which began in the mid-19th century, they had ranged from the mid-Zambezi valley near Vila de Sena through the Lower and Middle Shire valley and into the western part of the Shire Highlands.

A description of the M'Bona cult dating from 1953 recounted then-current traditions of M'Bona who, it was claimed, possessed rainmaking powers and was a relative of the ruler who had the hereditary title of Lundu. M'Bona fled south because he had usurped the Lundu's power as a ruler and intermediary with the High God to ensure prosperity for his people. M'Bona had made rain during a drought after the Lundu had failed to do so, and was accused of witchcraft. During his flight, M'Bona was said to have rested in several places in southern Malawi, all within the area inhabited by the Mang'anja, before he was killed by his pursuers and beheaded. The places where he rested and that where he was killed were said to have become rain-shines after his death. Jan Matthew Schoffeleers, who studied the cult for other 30 years, notes the opposing traditions that an historical M'Bona was either a relative of the first Lundu, as in Rangeley's account, or a priest of the Khulubvi rain shrine who had been killed by the first Lundu when he destroyed that shrine, and he proposed a third possible explanation, that M’Bona was the personification of the suffering of the Mang'anja people conquered by the Lundu, rather than a single individual.

Schoffeleers suggested that a change in Portuguese policy in the 1590s, which involved setting up forts in the Zambezi valley and employing African mercenaries called Zimba, who attacked uncooperative local rulers and raided for slaves, disrupted agriculture and caused widespread suffering throughout an area that included southern Malawi. These Zimba conquerors set up more centralised states, including one whose leader had the title of Lundu, and destroyed centres of possible resistance, including cult shrines, with the intention of replacing these by cult of his own ancestors, so combining secular and ritual power in a single office that he occupied instead of being separate. However, the alien Lundu had no means of communicating with the territorial spirits whose shrines his mercenaries had destroyed, so the original population regarded his rule, and his claim to possess rain-making powers, as illegitimate. Once the first Lundu was defeated in 1622 by the Portuguese who had turned against him, his claim to control the ritual activity of rain-calling ended. Although he and his successors retained political control, a form of dual authority was re-established. the Khulubvi shrine was restored but was rededicated to M’Bona, a martyr who Schoffeleers initially considered to be a historical person, but later either a priest of the shrine or a personification of the suffering of the conquered Mang'anja people.

Schoffeleers initially claimed that the M'Bona rain shrine at Khulubvi in Nsanje District in the lower Shire Valley, where it is said M'Bona's head was placed after his killing, had been in existence since at least 1500 and was at the heart of a cult whose influence stretched as far as the Indian Ocean in the east, Tete in the west, the Shire Highlands in the north and the Lower Zambezi valley in the south, and that it gave rise to other M'Bona shrines. Subsequently, following excavation at the site by an archaeologist, the same scholar reported that material dating from between the 8th and 17th centuries had been found at Khulubvi. However, Schoffeleers considered that, before its destruction by the Lundu around 1600, its original form was as a shrine to the High God manifested as a python, whereas when restored it became a shrine to M’Bona, a martyr whose nature could be either that of a single individual or the personification of the suffering that the people conquered by Lundu suffered.

Another scholar considers M'Bona to have originated as a river god or spirit of a type known in other parts of Zambezia, the area of the Zambezi and its tributaries, as much as a protector against floods as a provider of rain, adding that some of these precursors of M'Bona were female. In at least one 19th century case, M'Bona was a female spirit, and her husband was a snake, which Wrigley links to the widespread African mythological theme of the conflict of the eagle, representing lightning and flood, and the python, representing the rainbow and adequate rainfall, and protector against flood or drought. It seems unlikely that there was originally a single M'Bona cult with many shrines over a wide area so much as a range of shrines devoted to different versions of a widespread myth. Although the Khulubvi shrine was of considerable antiquity, its original form may have been that of a shrine to the python god, only later becoming a shrine of M'Bona.

There are three rain-shrines in central Malawi among the Chewa people, another offshoot of the Maravi. The first was at Msinja, where its female founder was also said to be of a ruling lineage, the first in a line of priestesses and prophetesses called Makewana. However, In contrast to M'Bona, there was no suggestion that the first Makewana was or became a deity: instead she was said to be possessed by god. The two other minor rain cults were not associated with a ruling family and little is known of them.

The reconstruction of Territorial Cults in Central Africa by Ranger described below suggests that most of these cults changed their nature over time, from shrines originally devoted to nature spirits with female priestesses or mediums, becoming shrines controlled by locally-powerful families, which reclassified the spirit as that of a deceased ancestor, and its priestesses as wives of that spirit. This suggests that Wrigley may be correct on the ultimate origin of the cult, and that the priestesses and prophetesses at the Msinja may be relics of more widespread former practice. However, Schoffeleers entirely dismisses Wrigley's claim that accounts of M'Bona are a myth, insisting on M'Bona having had some form of historical reality and dating his death to around 1600.

Initially, when they met Livingstone's party and the UMCA missionaries, officials of the M'Bona cult were hostile to their exposition of Christian doctrines, regarding them as likely to undermine Mang'anja society. However, when many of the Mang'anja became Christians from the 1920s, particularly under the influence of Catholic missionaries, the M'Bona cult incorporated some Christian themes into its belief system, modifying the nature of the M'Bona myth by portraying M'Bona as a prophet and martyr, the black parallel of Jesus, and the saviour through his death of black people, as Jesus is for whites.

Although most adherents to the M'Bona cult were Mang'anja, when Lomwe people with similar social structures moved into areas inhabited by Mang'anja people, they were also allowed to adopt the cult, although Sena people, who were immigrants from Mozambique as were the Lomwe, were not. In the south of Nsanje district, Sena residents began to outnumber the existing Mang'anja population in the first quarter of the 20th century, although most village headmen were Mang'anja, whose use of M'Bona shrines distinguished them from Sena villagers who had lower status.

=== The shrines ===
The sacred sites currently associated with M'Bona and claimed to derive from Khulubvi are found at Nyandzikwi, Nkhadzi and Mwala in Nsanje District; Kaloga sacred cave in Mwabvi Wildlife Reserve, where sacrifices were offered in times of drought, disease or other calamities; Chifunda Lundu, the present day headquarters of Paramount Chief Lundu, Mtsakana and Konde Dzimbiri rain shrines, all three in Chikwawa district and a hut for the worship of M'Bona at Katchsi in Thyolo district. These are all, except for Katchsi, in the Shire valley to the west of the river, in a zone of around 120 km from north to south. Rangeley also mentions Dzambawe and Nyangazi, both in Mozambique as sites connected to M'Bona The principal Khulubvi rain shrine was destroyed an incursion from Mozambique in the early 1860s, but soon rebuilt.

Rangeley and Schoffeleers have both given accounts of the M'Bona rites as they existed in the 1950s and 1960s, or as they had existed and were recorded in popular memory. Schoffeleers' more detailed account relates specifically to the Khulubvi shrine. The Khulubvi shrine and others were built in thickets, so not easily visible, and contained three huts, each rebuilt when it fell into decay, one for M'Bona, another for his spirit wife and the third for the wife's maidservant. "Spirit wives", were a common feature of all the shrines; permanently celibate women who traditionally served until death and received spirit messages} for their communities in the form of dreams. At Khulubvi and other shrines, a woman of marriageable age was traditionally selected as the spirit wife of M'Bona with the title Salima and supported by a handmaiden. After the 1880s, the position of Salima lost status and was filled by elderly widows, and the handmaiden was a young girl with the name Camanga who only served until puberty, although the post may earlier have been one for a woman of marriageable age . No spirit wives were recorded after the late 19th century.

In some cases, M'Bona's spirit was said to communicate with Salima in dreams, in others the medium was a male officiant of the shrine. No women held the positions of Salima or Camanga in the 1950s, and the mediums at that time were male. Schoffeleers suggests that mediums associated with the cult at Khulubvi only began that association around 1900, after the line of spirit wives ended, when a female medium replaced Salima. Later mediums were usually male but included two females; some were descended from the first medium, others were relatives of a shrine guardian. Each shrine has one or more hereditary guardians or principals, of which Khulubvi had two competing ones from two chiefly lineages, and two officials responsible for its upkeep At Khulubvi the medium also has guardians and an interpreter of what the medium's utterances mean.

There were three main M'Bona rites at Khulubvi, annual communal rain prayers, rebuilding the shrine and, formerly, the induction of a new spirit wife. Rain prayers, accompanied by libations of millet beer, are said to be offered in October and November each year at the end of the dry season, and again if there is a drought. Huts within the shrine are built out of insubstantial materials and never repaired but rebuilt, with an accompanying animal sacrifice, when the existing ones fall into decay. Rangeley says little about rites at the shrines, except that offerings of live animals, grain and beer were made to ensure plentiful rainfall.

The cult declined during the early 20th century, and several shrines fell into disuse. However, following a widespread famine caused by a failure in the rains in 1949, it had a significant revival

=== Revival and politics ===
In the 1950s and until Malawi's independence in 1964, the Khulubvi rain shrine was associated with a chief whose title was Tengani. However, the Chief Tengani before independence was a supporter of the Federation of Rhodesia and Nyasaland and also a committed Christian, who discouraged his people from using the shrine Since independence, holders of the Lundu title became the leading traditional authority in the Lower Shire. The Lundu chiefs, who were unimportant village headmen in the 1920s, and associated with the subsidiary shrine of Chifunda Lundu, claimed descent from the powerful Lundu chiefdom that was broken up in the early 19th century: the last chief of the original Lundu lineage was murdered in 1864 by some of the Kololo that David Livingstone brought from Botswana in 1862 as porters for his Zambezi expedition and left in the Lower Shire area at the end of the expedition in 1864. The current Lundu chiefs also claim that the Lundus before 1864 were patrons of the Khulubvi rain shrine, and although continuity between them and the 19th century Lundus is uncertain, the present title-holders are now recognised as patrons of that shrine.

The Nyasaland famine of 1949, caused by a failure of the seasonal rains, was most severe in the south of the protectorate and led to a revival of the cult. In the aftermath of the famine, the colonial Agricultural Department introduced what it claimed were soil conservation techniques, more suited to sloping upland areas than the flat river valley. The M'Bona medium prophesied that use of these techniques would cause further drought. Although the administration imposed the regulations, this was the start of a period where the M'Bona medium opposed either the protectorate administration or the Federation of Rhodesia and Nyasaland or both, culminating in the arrest and imprisonment of the medium during the 1959 State of Emergency.

The Khulubvi shrine had a poor relationship with Molin Tengani, who retired in 1961. It hoped to improve this with his successor, Stonken Tengani, but he cut his links with the shrine in 1967.

== M'Bona as a territorial cult ==
There is no consensus among archaeologists and historians on the origin of the Maravi people, but many believe that there was a mingling of early settlers and a later ruling group. The former, sometimes known as the Chipeta, had moved into the area around the south of Lake Malawi early in the second millennium, perhaps from the 11th century onwards and, although they did not form centralised states, their leaders had the clan name Banda. The later ruling group were said to be migrants from the Katanga region who, sometime between the 14th and 16th centuries, brought ideas of chiefly power into what had been a stateless population. These newcomers belonged the Phiri clan of the Chewa people, and this clan formed a number of centralised states. However, as the account of Muzura shows, the claim to Phiri ancestry could be assumed by a successful parvenu, and Phiri titles such as Lundu (and also Kalonga, if it predated the mid-17th century) could be appropriated by previous subordinates.

The concept of a "territorial cult" is one where the spirit venerated relates to a particular area, not to a kinship group. The cult's main function is to secure the well-being of the local people through one or more of rain-making, the control of floods, maintaining the fertility of the soil or promoting success in fishing or hunting. These spirits may either be nature spirits or deified former human beings, some with one central shrine, others with several separate shrines. Some, but not all, if these cults involve spirit possession or mediumship. Territorial cults generally involve the whole community of a particular area, but are usually controlled by a local elite that provides priests, shrine guardians and other functionaries. This distinguishes territorial cults from ancestral cults that do not involve the whole community and spirit possession, which are not controlled by an elite and may spread a beyond an area. Within this diversity, Ranger believes there are common themes, and the originally single people that later split into separate Chewa, Tumbuka and Mang'anja groups initially shared a common belief in a High God, and in spirits that acted as intermediates between that god and mankind. They also believed that humans that were able to communicate with the spirits. Ranger also considered that these ideas were modified later, so that some territorial cult continue to venerate a High God while others venerate nature spirits of deified humans. In some cases, a territorial cult dominates an area to the exclusion of other cults, in other areas it co-exists with other cults, and in recent time with Christianity.

Firstly, these ideas became attached to specific local sites and, in the absence of central leadership, local territorial cults formed, usually with a prominent family controlling the shrine and with priestesses "married" to a spirit intermediary acting as oracles or mediums. Secondly, before political organisation developed, there was some centralisation of local cults, with some accorded precedence over others. Thirdly, migrant members of the Phiri clan formed centralised states and took over control of many shrines, replacing the former guardian families with their officials and substituting deceased Phiri rulers or members of those rulers' families as the spirits of the shrine. The role of priestesses was often reduced, with their function as mediums either ceasing or being taken over by men. Finally, the status of various shrines rose of fell as the fortunes of the states controlling them changed, to create the variety observed in recent times. In particular, where a state was conquered, what was previously a High God of an independent people may become the shine of a divinized human being from the conquering rulers, as may had been the case when the area around the original M'Bona shrine was conquered by the Lundu.

Before the Phiri rulers gained power, it is claimed, M'Bona was the title of the priestess, the wife of the spirit intermediary, with her main shrine in Thyolo district and a minor shrine in Nsanje district. The latter became associated with a chief with real or assumed Phiri ancestry and the title Lundu, and the name M'Bona was transferred to a deceased member of the Lundu family. As the Lundu chiefs grew more powerful, the Khulubvi shrine gained prominence and the former priestess was demoted to the status of the newly named M'Bona's wife. However, some memory of her function as a medium may have remained, until this was taken over by a male medium. As the Lundu state expanded, it absorbed other cult sites, where the name M'Bona was applied to nature spirits of the river, who were protector against floods

Schoffeleers accepts that a generalised Central African belief in a High God with spirit intermediaries existed, adding that, in one particular instance, this belief was transformed into the story of a human martyr, and this later absorbed other cults. He also accepts it is impossible to know if there was a single rain priest called M'Bona who persecuted and murdered or whether one or more members of an M'Bona priesthood were murdered and that name was attached to one or all of them. Nevertheless, he argues that, as the story of M'Bona's life and death is not part of any cult ceremony, it is not a myth in the normal sense but an orally-relayed biography
