= Makalaka =

Term used by the Tswana and Ndebele people

Makalaka or Amakhalanga is a general designation used by the Bechuana, Matabele, and kindred peoples, for the Bantu groups who had their Mapungubwe kingdom north of the area of the said groups. The Makalaka people are believed to have had rainmaking powers and because of this, were substantially different from the other Bantu peoples.

The fall of this nation led to many of the people seeking refuge among the people who mainly inhabited the Lubumbo area.Thus, many of the tribes subjugated by the Kololo chief Sebetwane circa 1830 were called Makalaka.

By 1911 the name was more frequently used to designate the Bakalanga, one of the peoples mistakenly classed as Shonas, who lived alongside the Bechuana and Matebele.

== Notable people ==
- Uwini, a Makalaka leader
