= Uwini =

Makalaka leader from Zimbabwe

Uwini was a Makalaka leader from Zimbabwe. He was considered a divinity. He was in the resistance against the British colonialism and was accused of participating in the murder of white settlers by the British South Africa Company. He was tried by court-martial and executed on the edge of the Somaboola (Somabhula) Forest about 80 miles from Bulawayo in 1896.

== Sources ==
- Robert Baden-Powell: The Matabele-Campaign 1896. - Online-Ausgabe in Englisch
