= Mamochisane =

- Born: Mamochisane
- Title: Queen of the Makololo tribe
- Predecessor: Sebetwane
- Successor: Sekeletu
- Spouse: King Sipopa Lutangu
- Parent(s): King Sebetwane and one of his wives
- Relatives: Sekeletu and Mpepe (brothers); Litali (nephew)

Mamochisane (fl. 1851) was a Makololo Queen who ruled over many people, but especially the Lozi in Barotseland, today's Western Zambia, in 1851. She was later a wife of King Sipopa Lutangu.

== Biography ==
Mamochisane was a daughter of the King Sebetwane, half-sister of Prince Sekeletu, and sister or half-sister of Prince Mpepe. She was the niece of king Mbololo.

Mamochisane was also a military leader, and commanded a regiment of warriors during her father's campaign against the Lozu. She succeeded her father on his death in 1851, as he had intended long before his death, even if she had brothers. She maintained the friendship with the traveller David Livingstone, which had been initiated by her father, giving him permission to visit all her kingdom.

When Livingstone returned in 1853 to the Makololo's capital, Linyati, he found out that only shortly after her father's death she had stepped down in favour of her brother Sekeletu, who became a new king. In Livingstone's account the reason was her desire to have a stable husband and a family that was firmly hers, while as a ruler she was forced to alternate many husbands so that none got too much power.

Mamochisane had a nephew called Litali; he was a Sekeletu's son. She married Sipopa Lutangu.

== Literature ==
- Encyclopædia Britannica, Sebetwane
