= Sekeletu =

Late king of the Makololo nation

- Born: Sekeletu c. 1835
- Died: 1863
- Title: King of the Makololo tribe
- Predecessor: Mamochisane
- Children: Prince Litali; Prince Sesane
- Parent(s): King Sebetwane and Queen Setlutlu
- Relatives: Mamochisane (half-sister); Mpepe (half-brother)

Sekeletu (c. 1835–1863) was the Makololo King of Barotseland in western Zambia from about 1851 to his death in 1863.

== Biography ==
Sekeletu was a son of the King Sebetwane and Queen Setlutlu. He succeeded his half-sister Mamochisane, who had decided to step down from the throne. It was she who proclaimed him new ruler, against the ambitions of Sekeletu's half-brother Mpepe, who unsuccessfully tried to block him by insinuating that he was not the lawful son of Sebetwane, since Sekeletu's mother had been previously married to another chief.

He appears to have been very young when he took power, as the explorer David Livingstone presumed on first meeting him in Linyati in 1853 that he was about 18 years old. Sekeletu's relations with the explorer appear to have been very good, as confirmed by the 27 Makololo that under their king's orders went with Livingstone with the goal of finding a road between Barotseland and the port of Luanda, capital of Portuguese West Africa.

His relations with another group of European missionaries were not so good. Like Livingstone, these were members of the London Missionary Society. When they arrived in 1860, headed by Holloway Helmore, they had no formal introduction from Livingstone and were warned by Robert Moffat not to go until they heard from David Livingstone. Ignoring Moffat's advice would prove fatal. Eight of the twelve members of the expedition died (Helmore included) of malaria. Roger and Isabella Price survived. Two of Helmore's children also survived. Ironically David Livingstone had left supplies of quinine in the vicinity, but the missionaries did not know it. Isabella Price died and was buried on the plain of Mababe. David Livingstone was greatly moved by the death of the other missionaries if they had only heeded Moffat's advice the disaster could have been avoided.

Sekeletu was a bad tempered leader who did not care for the Lozi people eventually proving himself an unsuccessful ruler, generating discontent among the Lozi, the people who had formerly ruled the land. When he contracted leprosy, Sekeletu no longer trusted the Lozi whom he suspected of having bewitched him as a leper. Therefore, many Lozi were put to death. Due to this, a year after his death the Makololo's power crumbled and the Lozi regained self-rule. Sekeletu had two sons, Princes Litali and Sesane. Members of Sekeletu's tribe believed that their king has died from God's punishment.

His uncle Mbololo later took the kingship

== Literature ==
- Encyclopædia Britannica, "Sebetwane"
- Centralised Societies - The Luyi (Lozi)
