= Mbololo (king) =

- Other names: Mpololo
- Title: King of the Makololo tribe
- Relatives: Sebetwane (brother); Mamochisane (niece); Sekeletu (nephew)

Mbololo (or Mpololo) was a Litunga (chief) of Makololo tribe, a successor of Liswaniso. He ruled from 1863 to 1864. He was the last king of the Makololo dynasty.

== Biography ==
=== Family ===
Mbololo was a brother of the King Sebetwane and uncle of the Queen Mamochisane and King Sekeletu.

=== Reign ===
He was a successor of the king Liswaniso and he seized the kingship in 1863. He was even more unpopular then Sekeletu.

He was very cruel and was overthrown by a force led by a Lozi contingent from the north in August 1864. After his death general Njekwa destroyed Makololo.

=== View of Coillard ===
The French missionary François Coillard, who had read much of David Livingstone’s work noted:

All their (Lozi) chiefs have been the servants or slaves of Sebetoane and Sekeletu. It is from these Makololo potentates, of whom they always speak with affection and the highest respect, that they received their education, and formed their ideal of the dignity, manners and power of a sovereign. The warrior tribe of Barotsi, once subdued, had become the most devoted of all to the interests of the Makololo; and if Mpololo (Mbololo) the cousin and successor of Sekeletu had not shown himself so capriciously cruel, they would never have thought of revolting.

== Sources ==
- Makololo interregnum and the legacy of David Livingstone (PDF)
- Dictionary of African historical biography by Mark R. Lipschutz and R. Kent Rasmussen
- Trade and Travel in Early Barotseland by George Westbeech, Edward C. Tabler, Norman Magnus MacLeod
- Iron Age Cultures in Zambia: Dambwa, Ingombe Ilede, and the Tonga by Brian M. Fagan, D. W. Phillipson, and S. G. H. Daniels
