= Sebetwane =

Late chief of the Kololo people

- Born: between about 1790 and 1800
- Died: July 7, 1851; Barotseland
- Other names: Sebitwane and Sibutuane
- Known for: Establishing Makololo nation
- Title: King (chief) of the Makololo tribe
- Successor: Queen Mamochisane
- Spouse(s): Queen Setlutlu; Queen Kololo
- Children: Queen Mamochisane; King Sekeletu; Prince Mpepe
- Relatives: Princes Sesane and Litali (grandsons)

Sebetwane (between about 1790 and 1800 – July 7, 1851) was chief of the Patsa branch of the Bafokeng clan. He established the large and powerful Makololo nation in what is now southwestern Zambia after an arduous migration of over 1200 kilometres from the clan's ancestral lands in Biddulphsberg, near modern-day Senekal, in the Free State province of South Africa .

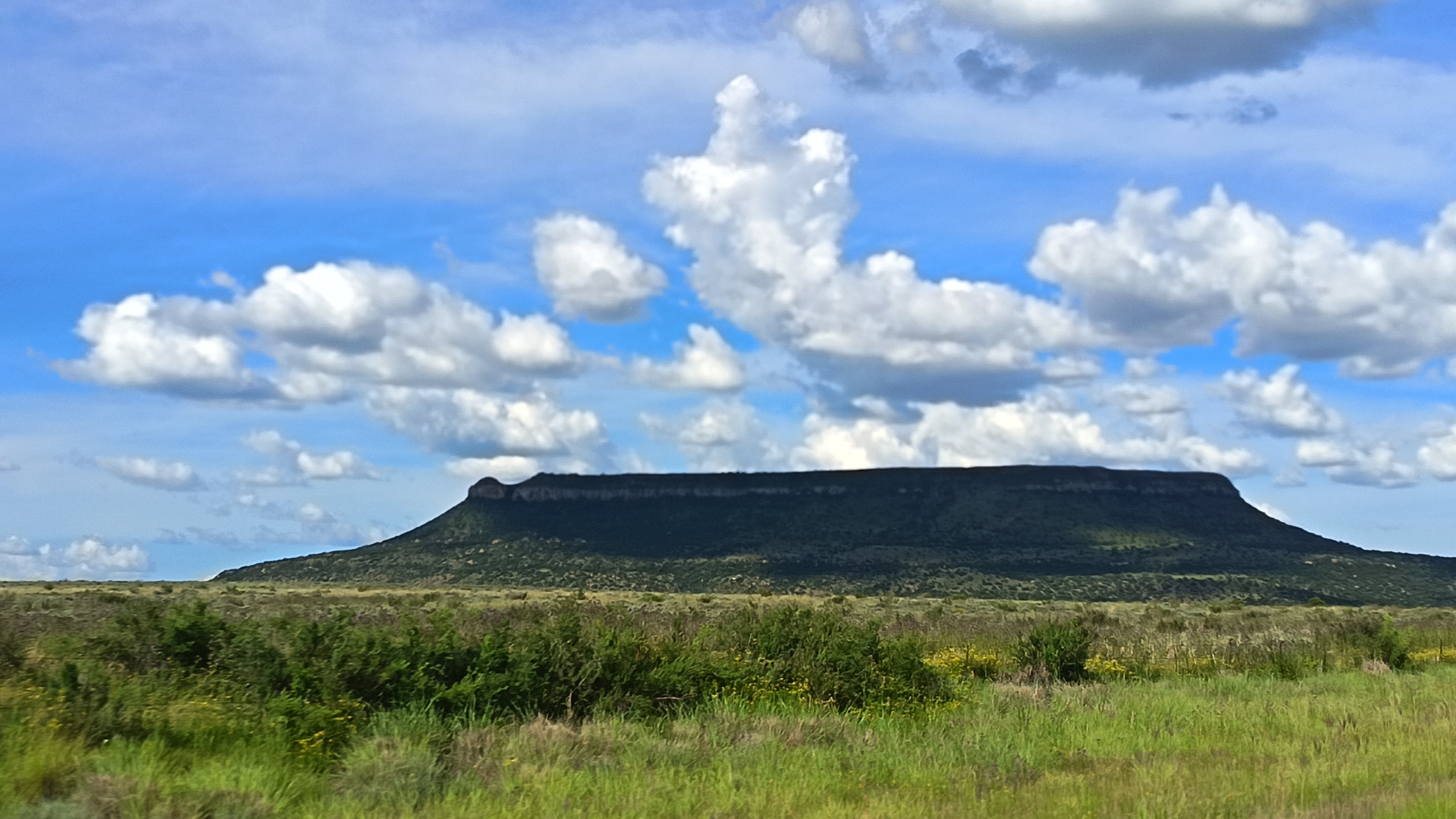
Biddulphsberg, as seen from N5 from Senekal to Bethlehem.

== Names ==
King's names also can be written as Sebitwane or Sibutuane. In isizulu he is called sibidwane.

== Biography ==
In the early 1820s Sebetwane was the Chief of a small Sotho group known as the Bafokeng-ba-ha-Patsa. His brother and predecessor was killed by a lion. Facing constant attacks and losing all their cattle during the early years of the Mfecane, Sebetwane urged his people to leave their homeland, the area which then Boers later called Biddulphsberg, near modern-day Senekal, in the Free State province of South Africa .

"My masters, you see that the world is collapsing. We shall be eaten up one by one. Our fathers taught us peace means prosperity, but today there is no peace, no prosperity! Let us march!"

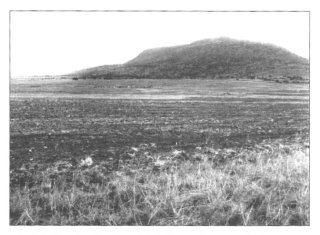
Biddulphsberg in 1991.

In 1823 they moved north near what is now the southern borders of Botswana, attacking a number of other societies and incorporating their younger members. These attacks were largely successful for three years, and the Kololo increased their population and cattle wealth. Pushed north by the advancing Ndebele, the Kololo suffered a catastrophic defeat at Dithubaruba in 1826 to a coalition of forces headed by the Ngwaketse chief Sebego I. Following this defeat they moved north-east, but continuing warfare there eventually pushed them towards the Okavango Delta in 1834. Once in the area, Sebetwane's heir was killed, although in 1835 Sebetwane won a major victory over the Batawana and controlled the area for a few years before striking north again around 1840.

After briefly settling near Mosi-oa-Tunya, Victoria Falls, in 1838, Sebetwane passed the Zambesi River and conquered the Lozi's kingdom. He was both able to conciliate Makololo and Lozi and repel two attacks brought against him by Mzilikazi, king of the Ndebele. He died on July 7, 1851, shortly after meeting at Linyati, his capital, the missionary explorer David Livingstone, with whom he developed a warm friendship.

== Personality ==
Distinguished as both a warrior and a statesman, Sebetwane was able to consolidate his military gains by his generous and just treatment of the conquered peoples. Even those who had been conquered by him and eventually fled his kingdom maintained that he was an extremely warm leader: Sebetwane "loved people very much even if they were his victims."

== Family ==
Sebetwane had a wife named Setlutlu. His oldest son, Kgwaanyane, was his favorite and was pampered. Carried around the Kalahari in a litter, he was sheltered from battle but eventually was killed in an ambush by the Herero. He was succeeded by his daughter Mamochisane, who soon stepped down in favour of her half-brother Sekeletu. He also had a son named Mpepe, who was an enemy of Sekeletu, and grandson called Litali.

His brother Mbololo later became a king of makololo
