= Lozi people =

Bantu ethnic group of Southern Africa

Balozi
- Flag of the Lozi nation

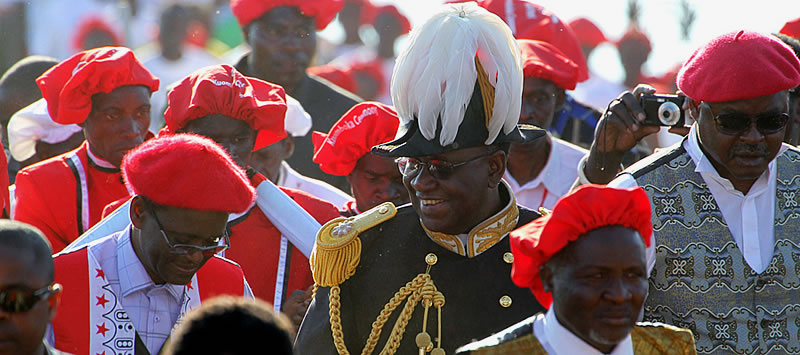
- Litunga (king) of the Lozi (in black)

Total population
- 1,561,900"Balozi".

Regions with significant populations
- Zambia: 1,325,000
- Zimbabwe: 166,000
- Namibia: 41,000
- Botswana: 20,000

Languages
- Silozi

Religion
- Christianity • minority African traditional religion

Related ethnic groups
- Sotho-Tswana peoples

Lozi
- Person: Mulozi
- People: Balozi
- Language: Silozi
- Country: Bulozi

The Lozi people, also known as Balozi, are a Bantu-speaking ethnic group native to Zambia and Zimbabwe. The population of the Lozi people is estimated to be 1,562,000 in all countries combined. They refer to their land as Bulozi or Barotseland.

The Lozi comprise several tribes including the Bamakoma, Kwanda, Lukolwe, Bafwe, Batotela, Bayeyi, Mbowe (Mamboe), Bambukushu, Mishulundu, Muenyi (Mwenyi), Mwanga, Ndundulu and Basubia. Intermarriage among the tribes further strengthens their cultural bonds.

== Name ==
The word "Lozi" means "plain" in the Makololo language, referring to the Barotse Floodplain of the Zambezi River, on and around which most Lozi live. It may also be spelled Lotse or Rotse, the spelling Lozi having originated with German missionaries in what is now Namibia. Mu- and Ba- are corresponding singular and plural prefixes for certain nouns in the Silozi language, so Murotse means "person of the plain" while Barotse means "people of the plain".

The Lozi people are also known by various names such as the Malozi, Nyambe, Makololo, Barotse, Rotse, Rozi, Rutse, Balozi, Balobedu, and Tozvi.

== History ==
The Lozi kingdom was founded in the 17th century, and expanded to encompass the Bulozi Floodplain and surrounding territories.

In about 1830, an army which originated in the Sotho-speaking Bafokeng who occupied the areas around Biddulphsberg, near modern-day Senekal, in the Free State, South Africa, known as the Makololo, led by a warrior called Sebetwane, invaded Barotseland and conquered the Lozi. They ruled until 1864, when the Sotho clique was overthrown following a Lozi revolt.

The political organisation of the Lozi has long centred on a monarchy, whose reigning head, the Paramount King, is known as 'Litunga', which means 'keeper of the earth.' The renowned Litunga Lewanika, whose latter name was a nickname from the Mbunda meaning "unifier" following the Lozi revolt, reigned from 1878 to 1916, with a short insurrectionist break in 1884–85. He requested that Queen Victoria bring Barotseland under protectorate status. Great Britain, however, was uninterested in acquiring the territory. The granting of a royal charter to the British South Africa Company by Cecil Rhodes allowed the company to acquire Barotseland under the guise of the British government. Although under protectorate status, Lewanika eventually realized that he had been tricked and petitioned for the protectorate status to be corrected. Yet the land remained under Rhodes's control, and when no valuable resources like gold, copper, or other exports were found in the territory, the "British South Africa Company defaulted on every commitment it had made to Lewanika," resulting in little progress in the development of infrastructure and education.

Although Barotseland was incorporated into Northern Rhodesia, it retained a large degree of autonomy, which was carried over when Northern Rhodesia became Zambia on its independence in 1964. In the run-up to independence, the Litunga, the Ngambela (Prime Minister), and about a dozen senior indunas went to London for talks with the Colonial Office, in an attempt to have Barotseland remain a Protectorate.

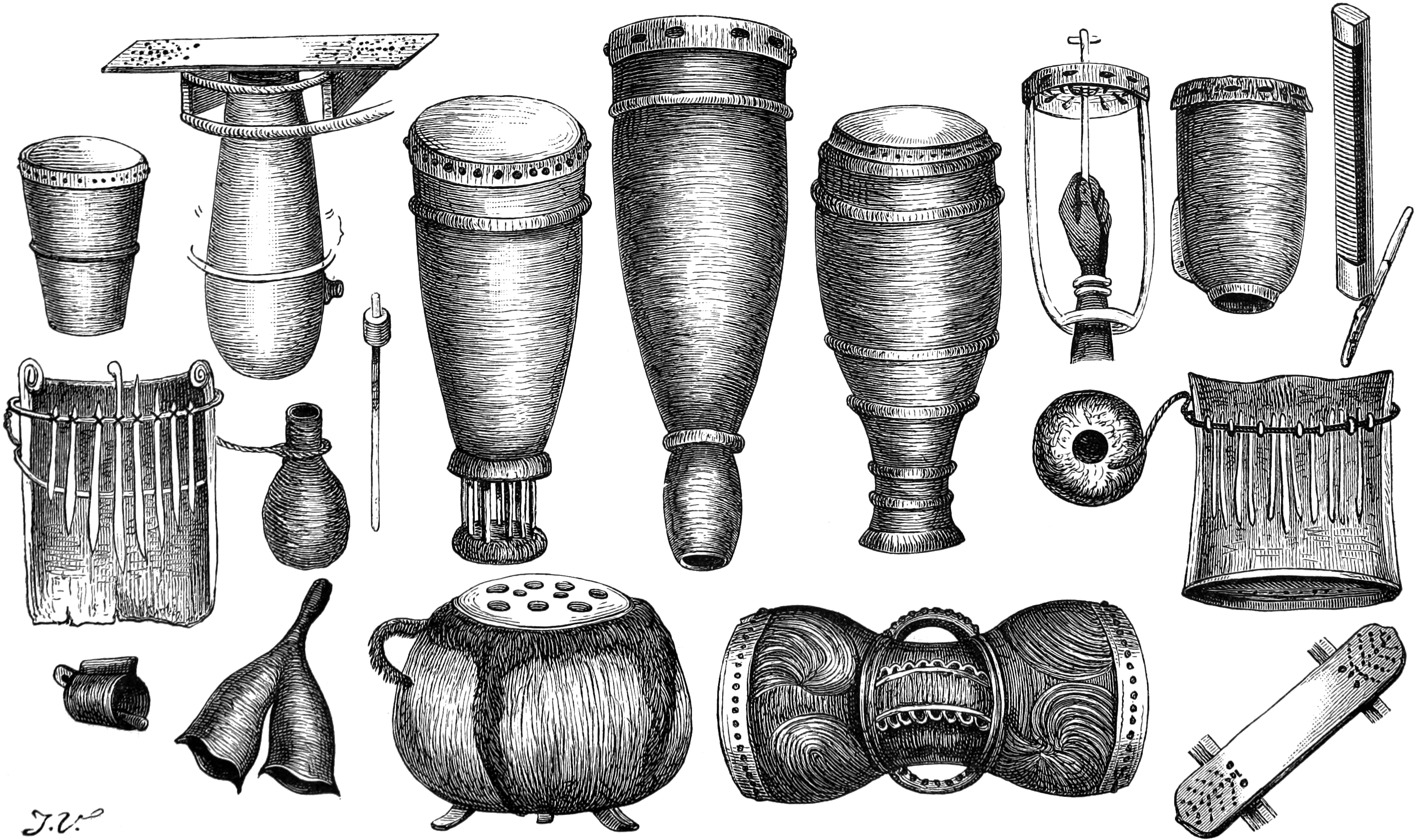
Musical instruments, 1870s

== Culture ==
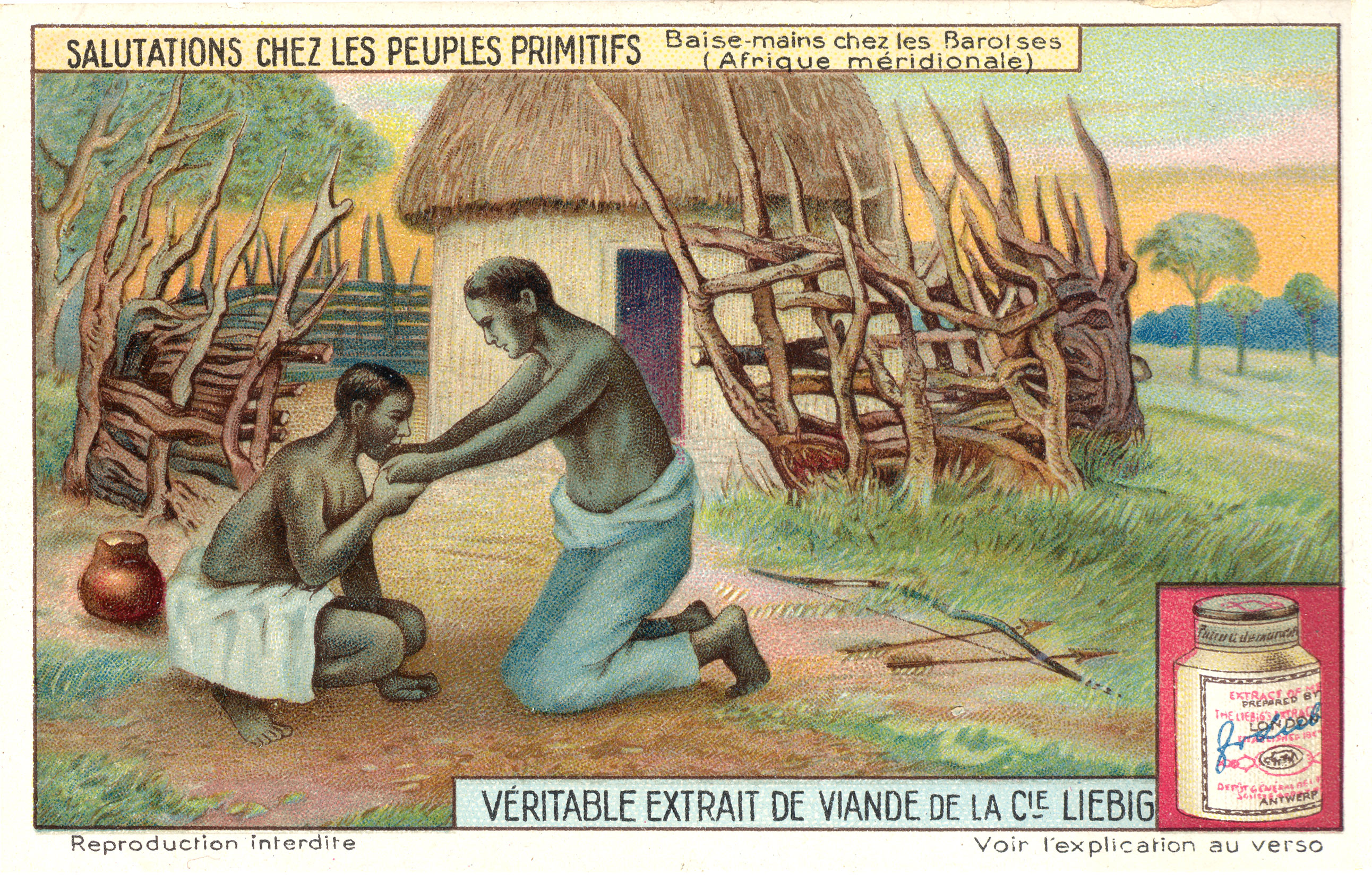
Barotse handkiss

Lozi society is stratified, with a monarch at the top and those of recent royal descent occupying high positions in society.

Lozi culture is strongly influenced by the flood cycle of the Zambezi River, with annual migrations taking place from the floodplain to higher ground at the start of the wet season. The most important of these events and festivals is the Kuomboka, in which the Litunga moves from Lealui in the flood plain to Limulunga on higher ground. The Kuomboka usually takes place in February or March. The annual floods displace hundreds of people every year.

Lozi traditional dress is the siziba for men (consisting of a shirt and knee-length skirt, sometimes paired with a sleeveless jacket and mashushu (red beret)), and the musisi for women (possibly influenced by crinolines worn by wives of 19th-century missionaries).

=== Dances ===
The Luyana/Lozi had two main ceremonial dances: Ngomalume (a war dance performed by men) and Liwale (performed by women), which were not accompanied by singing and were performed at royal events. Ngomalume involves belly movement, and it was said that "no hungry man can dance [it] effectively". Other dances included Liimba, Lishemba, and Sipelu, all accompanied by singing and often drums, which were performed in the evening. Sipelu involves men and women in opposite lines, where only one or two pairs danced at a time. Siyemboka was introduced by the Mbunda and was performed at beer parties, festivals, ceremonies, and girls' initiations.
