= 2000 Zambian census =

2000 Census of Zambia
- October, 2000 - May, 2001

General information
- Country: Zambia
- Topics: Census topics: People and population; Families and living arrangements; Nationality; Education; Economic Characteristics
- Authority: Central Statistical Office

The 2000 Zambian census was conducted in Zambia in 2000 by DRS under approval of the Government of Zambia, which recorded demographic data from 13 million people and 4 million households. Planning for the project commenced in 1998. In October 2000 the census started, with more than 30,000 workers across Zambia completing the 17 million double-sided A4 forms. The census was completed in May 2001. The scanning was undertaken in collaboration with the Examinations Council of Zambia (ECZ) and published by the Central Statistical Office. The census was noted by the Milton Keynes & North Bucks Chamber of Commerce and the DRS received a special commendation for its census work in Africa.

According to the census, Zambia had a total population of 9,885,591 with 4,946,298 (50.04%) males and 4,939,293 (49.46%) females and the sex ratio was 999 for every 1,000 males. The total literacy of the population above the age of five stood at 55.3 per cent. Urban population constituted 34.67 per cent and the remaining 65.33 per cent resided in rural areas. The density of population was 13.1 persons per km^{2} and the decadal growth of population was 2.50 per cent. There were 22 major languages spoken in Zambia of which 30.1 per cent of the population spoke Bemba, making it the largest spoken language. Out of the seven broad ethnic groups, Bemba was the most prevalent tribal group (33.6%), followed by Eastern Province group (18.2%). The total labour force was 3,165,151 with a total of 55 per cent of the population being inactive in rural areas and 45 per cent in urban areas. Unemployment increased in the country by 29.9 per cent in 2000. Agriculture was the major occupation with 71.5 per cent involved in it.

The people affected by HIV or AIDS constituted 15 per cent of the population, amounting to one million, of which 60 per cent estimated were women. Only 49 per cent of the total population had access to safe water, while only 15 per cent had access to proper toilets. As per the mortality indicators in 2000, the Infant Mortality Rate (IMR) stood at 110 deaths per 1,000 children born. The life expectancy at the time of birth increased from 47 in 1990 to 50 in 2000.

== Background ==
The first complete census of Africans in Zambia was carried out in Zambia during May 1963, when the country was a British colony, while the enumeration of non-African people was performed during 1961. Before the 2000 census enumeration, there were three census enumeration exercises carried out in independent Zambia during 1969, 1980 and 1990.

== Administration ==
Zambian 2000 census was carried out from 16 October to 15 November 2000 by 30,000 persons deputed by the Census Statistical Office of Zambia. There were two forms: Form A, which had basic details of full name, sex, membership status and was expected to be answered by senior member of each household; Form B had details about individual members of the family. When the respondent was a minor, proxy members having knowledge about the family were enquired. The details in form B were not sufficiently captured on account of lack of knowledge of the proxy members about the family enquired. All buildings that were complete, incomplete, abandoned, habitable or inhabitable were accounted by the enumerators.

== Reports ==
Zambia had a total population of 9,885,591 including 4,946,298 males and 4,939,293. Among the provinces, Copperbelt Province had the largest population followed by Lusaka, Eastern, Northern and Southern provinces. The interdecadal growth was 3.1 per cent compared to 2.5 per cent during the census of 1990 and 1980. The total literacy of the population above the age of five stood at 55.3 per cent. Urban population constituted 34.67 per cent and the remaining 65.33 per cent resided in rural areas. The density of population was 13.1 persons per km^{2} and the decadal growth of population was 2.50 per cent. The average annual population had a decrease of 19.4 per cent during the decade of 1990–2000. The highest number of females were found at Copperbelt Province, while the lowest was North-Western. Western Province had the highest sex ratio of 1,058 for every 1,000 males while Lusaka had the lowest of 971. The literacy rate was highest in Copperbelt and lowest in Eastern Province. Eastern Province had the largest number of individuals residing in rural areas, while Lusaka had the highest number residing in urban areas. The density of population was highest in Lusaka district with 63.5 persons living per km^{2}.

Population distribution in Zambia by states
| Provinces | Rank | Population | % of total population | Males | Females | Sex ratio | Literacy rate (%) | Rural (%) Population | Urban Population | Area (km^{2}) | Density (/km^{2}) | Decadal Growth% (1990–2000) |
|---|---|---|---|---|---|---|---|---|---|---|---|---|
| Central | 6 | 1,012,257 | 10.32% | 510,501 | 501,756 | 983 | 55.80% | 75.99% | 24.01% | 94,394 | 10.7 | 2.80% |
| Copperbelt | 1 | 1,581,221 | 16.16% | 799,402 | 781,819 | 978 | 70.50% | 22.14% | 77.86% | 31,328 | 50.5 | 0.80% |
| Eastern | 3 | 1,306,173 | 13.11% | 648,676 | 657,497 | 1,014 | 37.90% | 91.17% | 8.83% | 69,106 | 18.9 | 27.00% |
| Luapula | 8 | 775,353 | 7.84% | 387,825 | 387,528 | 999 | 48.40% | 86.95% | 13.05% | 50,567 | 15.3 | 3.20% |
| Luapula | 2 | 1,391,329 | 14.27% | 705,778 | 685,551 | 971 | 70.10% | 18.17% | 81.83% | 21,896 | 63.5 | 3.50% |
| Northern | 4 | 1,258,696 | 12.74% | 629,976 | 628,720 | 998 | 47.00% | 85.93% | 14.07% | 147,826 | 8.5 | 3.10% |
| North-Western | 9 | 583,350 | 5.88% | 290,856 | 292,494 | 1,006 | 43.40% | 87.71% | 12.29% | 125,826 | 3.1 | 2.90% |
| Southern | 5 | 1,212,124 | 12.16% | 601,440 | 610,684 | 1,015 | 56.20% | 78.81% | 21.19% | 85,283 | 14.2 | 2.30% |
| Western | 7 | 765,088 | 7.52% | 371,844 | 393,244 | 1,058 | 50.60% | 87.96% | 12.04% | 126,386 | 6.1 | 1.80% |
| TOTAL | Zambia | 9,885,591 | 100 | 4,939,293 | 4,939,293 | 999 | 55.3% | 65.33% | 34.67% | 752,612 | 13.1 | 2.5% |

== Language and ethnicity ==
The census of 2000 indicated that there were 22 major languages spoken in Zambia. A total of 30.1 per cent of the population spoke Bemba, making it the largest spoken language. Nyanja spoken by 10.7 per cent people and Tonga, spoken by 10.6 per cent people were the other commonly spoken languages. Bemba was most common in Copperbelt, Luapala and Northern provinces with more than 50 per cent of population speaking it as the provinces were historically occupied by Bemba tribal group. Lusaka was the most diverse among all provinces with more languages spoken. Southern Province had a majority speaking Tonga (69.8%) while a majority in Western Province spoke Lozi (60%).

Language spoken
| Language | Total (%) | Rural (%) | Urban (%) |
|---|---|---|---|
| Bemba | 30.1 | 19.7 | 48.5 |
| Bisa | 1 | 1.5 | 0.2 |
| Chewa | 4.9 | 6.7 | 1.8 |
| English | 1.7 | 0.3 | 4.2 |
| Ila | 0.8 | 1.1 | 0.2 |
| Kaonde | 2 | 2.5 | 1.2 |
| Lala | 2 | 2.8 | 0.5 |
| Lamba | 1.9 | 2.6 | 0.5 |
| Lenje | 1.4 | 2 | 0.3 |
| Lozi | 5.7 | 6.8 | 3.9 |
| Lunda | 2.2 | 2.9 | 0.9 |
| Lungu | 0.6 | 0.8 | 0.2 |
| Luvale | 1.7 | 2.2 | 0.8 |
| Mambwe | 1.2 | 1.6 | 0.7 |
| Namwanga | 1.3 | 1.6 | 0.7 |
| Ngoni | 1.2 | 1.3 | 1 |
| Nsenga | 3.4 | 4.4 | 1.7 |
| Nyanja | 10.7 | 4.4 | 21.8 |
| Senga | 0.6 | 0.9 | 0.2 |
| Tonga | 10.6 | 14.1 | 4.3 |
| Tumbuka | 2.5 | 3.4 | 0.9 |

The census identified seven broad ethnic groups, out of which Bemba was the most prevalent tribal group (33.6%), followed by Eastern Province group (18.2%). Bemba was most prevalent in Laupula, Central, Copperbelt and Northern provinces, while Tonga group was prevalent in Southern province. The seven ethnic groups were prevalent in nine of the ten provinces and accounted for two-thirds of the total population. Chewa, Nsenga, Tumbuka and Ngoni were the four ethnic groups of the ten found predominantly in Eastern province. Bemba, Kaonde and Mambwe were prevalent in urban areas.

Ethnicity
| Ethnicity | Total (%) | Male (%) | Female (%) | Rural Total (%) | Rural male (%) | Rural female (%) | Urban Total (%) | Urban male (%) | Urban female (%) |
|---|---|---|---|---|---|---|---|---|---|
| Bemba | 33.6 | 33.5 | 33.6 | 30.5 | 30.5 | 30.5 | 39.1 | 38.8 | 39.3 |
| Tonga | 16.8 | 16.7 | 16.9 | 20 | 20 | 20.1 | 11 | 10.8 | 11.1 |
| North-Western | 10.3 | 10.4 | 10.3 | 11.3 | 11.4 | 11.3 | 8.6 | 8.7 | 8.4 |
| Barotse | 7.8 | 7.7 | 7.9 | 8.8 | 8.6 | 8.9 | 6.1 | 6.2 | 6.1 |
| Eastern | 18.2 | 18.2 | 18.2 | 16.9 | 16.9 | 16.9 | 20.5 | 20.4 | 20.5 |
| Mambwe | 5.9 | 5.9 | 5.8 | 5.3 | 5.4 | 5.3 | 7 | 7 | 6.9 |
| Tumbuka | 5.1 | 5.1 | 5 | 4.8 | 4.8 | 4.8 | 5.6 | 5.7 | 5.4 |
| Others | 2.3 | 2.4 | 2.3 | 2.4 | 2.4 | 2.3 | 2.3 | 2.4 | 2.2 |

== Socio-economic conditions ==
The census computed economically active persons as persons above age of twelve involved in activities, while inactive people accounted were housewives, homemakers and students. The total labour force was 3,165,151 with 2,755,379 employed and 409,772 unemployed people. A total of 55 per cent of the population was inactive in rural areas and 45 per cent in urban areas. The labour force increased by 22.4 per cent in 2000 compared to 1990. Unemployment increased in the country by 29.9 per cent in 2000. A third of the employed population of 71.5 per cent is still involved in agriculture on account of lack of rapid industrialization. A large proportion (62%) of the country were untrained workers.

As per the report, only 2.7 per cent of the total population were above the age of 65. The country was predominantly rural with 65% of the population living in rural areas. The average size of the households stood at 5 with 80 per cent families led by men. Most of the male-led family households had 88.4 per cent married men, while 45.5 per cent of female-led families were led by widows. The survey also indicated that 73 per cent of the total population lived in poverty, with 83 per cent poor in rural and 56 per cent in urban areas. The people affected by HIV or AIDS constituted 15 per cent of the population, amounting to one million, of which 60 per cent estimated were women. The pandemic results in increased number of orphans, with an estimated 600,000 orphans in the country. It is estimated that by 2014, 974,000 children would be orphaned. There were a total of 1.8 million households with 52.4 per cent of them being traditional. A total of 78 per cent were single house holds. Only 49 per cent of the total population had access to safe water, while only 15 per cent had access to proper toilets. Garbage disposal was improper in 62 per cent of households. Urban households had better sanitation compared to rural areas. A total of 60.9 per cent of households used wood for cooking, while 50 per cent used kerosene for lighting. The increase in poverty during the decades of 1990 and 2000 were attributed to the cut in government subsidies in agriculture, slash in public services and removal of price control on key commodities.

Profession
| Profession | Total | Male (%) | Female (%) | Total Rural | Rural male (%) | Rural female (%) | Total Urban | Urban male (%) | Urban female (%) |
|---|---|---|---|---|---|---|---|---|---|
| Workers | 2812428 | 1,556,610 | 1,255,818 | 2114364 | 1,086,649 | 1,027,715 | 698,064 | 469,961 | 228,103 |
| Prof.Tech | 4.5 | 5.6 | 3.2 | 1.5 | 2.1 | 0.8 | 13.6 | 13.6 | 13.7 |
| Admin & Manag | 0.3 | 0.4 | 0.1 | 0 | 0.1 | 0 | 1.1 | 1.3 | 0.6 |
| Clerical Workers | 1.2 | 1.4 | 1 | 0.2 | 0.2 | 0.1 | 4.5 | 4.2 | 5.2 |
| Sales Workers | 7.3 | 7.4 | 7.2 | 2.1 | 2.1 | 2 | 23.3 | 19.8 | 30.5 |
| Service Workers | 3.8 | 4.6 | 2.8 | 0.8 | 1.1 | 0.5 | 12.9 | 12.8 | 12.9 |
| Agriculture | 71.5 | 65.4 | 79 | 89.5 | 87.6 | 91.5 | 16.9 | 14.2 | 22.5 |
| Prod Trans & Worker | 7.1 | 10.7 | 2.6 | 2.5 | 3.4 | 1.5 | 21.1 | 27.6 | 7.5 |
| Unclassified | 0.2 | 0.2 | 0.1 | 0.1 | 0.1 | 0.1 | 0.4 | 0.4 | 0.4 |
| Not stated | 4.1 | 4.2 | 4 | 3.4 | 3.4 | 3.4 | 6.3 | 6.1 | 6.7 |

== Mortality ==
As per the mortality indicators in 2000, the Infant Mortality Rate (IMR) stood at 110 deaths per 1,000 children born. It has declined by 12 per cent compared to 1990, but still higher than the levels of 1980. The rate was 16 per cent higher in rural areas compared to the urban areas on account of increased medical facilities in the urban areas. The number of male infants that died was significantly higher than the female infants. Eastern province had the highest IMR, while North-Western province had the lowest. A similar trend was observed in Child Mortality Rate (CMR) where rural and male CMR children were higher than the female counterparts. The life expectancy increased from 47 in 1990 to 50 in 2000, while the low life expectancy at birth is attributed to rural mothers, widowed mothers, uneducated mothers and working mothers.

Mortality in Zambia by provinces
| Provinces | Infant Mortality Rate (per ‘000) | Child Mortality Rate (per ‘000) | Under-five mortality Rate (per ‘000) | Life Expectancy at Birth (Years) |
|---|---|---|---|---|
| Zambia | 110 | 82 | 162 | 50 |
| Male | 120 | 91 | 169 | 48 |
| Female | 100 | 72 | 155 | 52 |
| Rural | 117 | 89 | 180 | 48 |
| Urban | 91 | 64 | 126 | 54 |
| Central | 100 | 72 | 144 | 52 |
| Copperbelt | 91 | 63 | 126 | 54 |
| Eastern | 129 | 100 | 196 | 46 |
| Luapula | 132 | 103 | 224 | 45 |
| Lusaka | 88 | 60 | 126 | 54 |
| Northern | 130 | 101 | 180 | 46 |
| North-Western | 83 | 56 | 137 | 56 |
| Southern | 93 | 65 | 138 | 53 |
| Western | 140 | 111 | 201 | 44 |

== Disability ==
The census computed disability based on whether the respondent was blind or visually impaired, partially sighted, deaf or dumb, hard of hearing, mentally ill, historically suffered mental disorders, intellectually disabled or physically challenged. There were a total of eight disabilities thus considered compared to 1990 census when only five disabilities were counted. The loss of feelings in fingers as defined by United Nations was not considered as disability for the survey. There were 256,690 persons in the country, constituting 2.7 per cent of the population, who were disabled. Western Province had 4 per cent disabled individuals, while Copperbelt had only 0.4 per cent disabled persons. The major reasons of disability were computed on account of diseases (38.4%), followed by injury (17.2%), prenatal causes (13.7%) and others (9%). The disabled were higher in rural areas compared to urban and males formed 53 per cent of disabled.

Disability in Zambia by provinces
| Province and sex | Zambia | Rural | Urban | Zambia (%) | Rural (%) | Urban (%) |
|---|---|---|---|---|---|---|
| Zambia | 9,337,425 | 5,990,356 | 3,347,069 | 2.7 | 3.2 | 0.2 |
| Central | 957,288 | 725,100 | 232,188 | 2.5 | 2.7 | 2 |
| Copperbelt | 1,527,294 | 290,724 | 1,236,570 | 2.3 | 3.5 | 2 |
| Eastern | 1,226,767 | 1,118,004 | 108,763 | 3.1 | 3.2 | 2 |
| Luapula | 729,828 | 616,846 | 112,982 | 3.4 | 3.4 | 3.2 |
| Lusaka | 1,341,167 | 238,483 | 1,102,684 | 1.9 | 2.8 | 1.7 |
| Northern | 1,174,316 | 1,011,727 | 162,589 | 3.2 | 3.1 | 3.5 |
| North | 539,822 | 468,796 | 71,026 | 2.8 | 2.9 | 1.9 |
| Southern | 1,132,810 | 892,141 | 240,669 | 2.6 | 2.8 | 1.7 |
| Western | 708,133 | 628,535 | 79,598 | 3.8 | 4.1 | 2 |
