= Zedwap =

Music streaming service

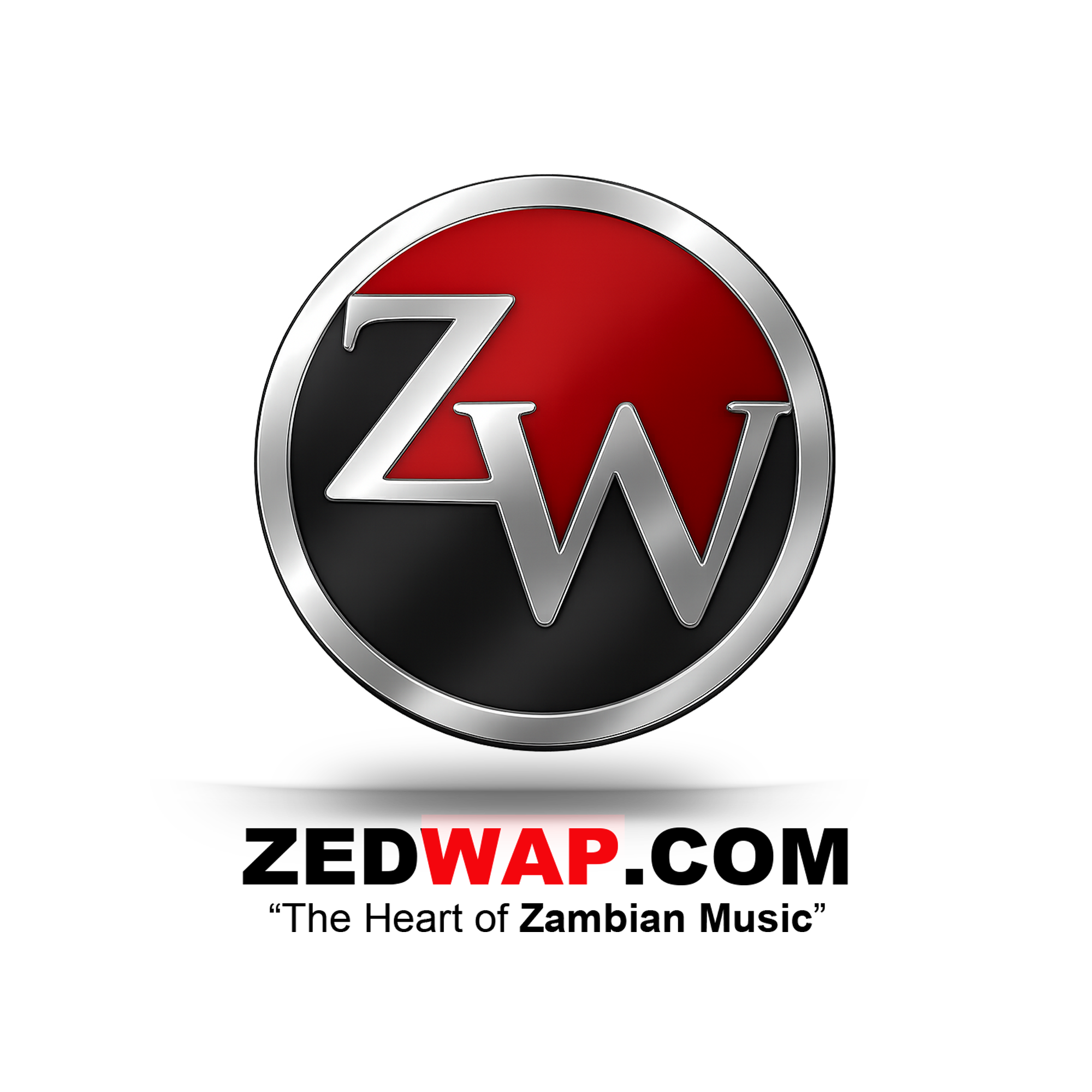
- Company type: Private
- Founded: 15 December 2017; 8 years ago Lusaka, Zambia
- Headquarters: Lusaka, {{{location_country}}}
- Key people: Austin Mweemba (CEO)
- Industry: Streaming on-demand media
- Services: Streaming media
- Website: zedwap.com
- Registration: Optional
- Users: 3 million (monthly active)
- Current status: Active
- Native client on: Web, Android

Zedwap or Zedwap Music, is a Zambian digital audio streaming and media service provider that allows artists to upload their music and listeners to stream or download tracks. As of May 2025, it had become one of the largest online music platforms in Zambia, attracting over 3 million monthly users.

== History and growth ==
Zedwap was established on December 15, 2017 by Lusaka-based entrepreneur Austin Mweemba as a digital platform focused on Zambian music and entertainment. Since then, it has grown from a small music blog into a recognized digital platform supporting Zambia’s online music culture.

After recovering from early hosting setbacks between 2017 and 2019, the platform strengthened its technical foundation and expanded its reach, with additional contributions from co-founder Vanessa Longwani from 2019 onward.

Between 2020 and 2021, Zedwap continued rebuilding and improving its content output, and from 2022 onward it expanded further by covering entertainment news, music trends, and artist features while introducing improved streaming and downloadable content. As the platform developed, its coverage expanded to include entertainment trends, celebrity news, sports updates, cultural content related to Zambia’s creative industry, and trending music from other African countries and around the world.

== Features ==
In addition to its web platform, Zedwap launched an Android application, which included features such as music streaming, downloads, and a simplified music upload process.

Music Charts Zedwap provides music charts that track popular songs and trends, allowing users to see the most listened-to tracks on the platform.

Music and Albums Users can browse a wide selection of individual songs and full albums across various genres.

Music Videos The platform hosts music videos, offering a visual experience alongside audio streaming.

Forums Zedwap includes interactive forums where listeners can discuss artists, releases, and industry developments.

Sports News In addition to music content, the platform offers updates and news from the sports world.

Hot 100 Songs Zedwap maintains a “Hot 100” list highlighting the most popular and trending songs on the platform.

Song Requests Listeners can request specific songs, enabling the platform to respond to user preferences and showcase emerging tracks.

Accounts and subscriptions Zedwap's features are available free of charge with advertisements. This enables users to stream and download local and international music content without requiring a subscription, while revenue is supported through in-app advertising.

Type	Ad-Free	Mobile listening	320 kbit/s audio?	Offline Save and Play	Music downloads
Free	No	Yes	Yes	Yes	Yes

== Reach and impact ==
As of May 2025, Zedwap Music was one of the largest online music platforms in Zambia, with over 3 million monthly users, serving as a widely used source for accessing local music online and reflecting the broader shift in the country from traditional media like radio to internet-based music discovery.

The platform’s reach provided local artists with greater visibility, enabling emerging musicians to connect with audiences beyond major urban centers. It also contributed to identifying popular music trends by offering insights into listener preferences and genre popularity, making music accessible nationwide—even in areas with limited access to live performances or radio coverage.
