= India–Zambia relations =

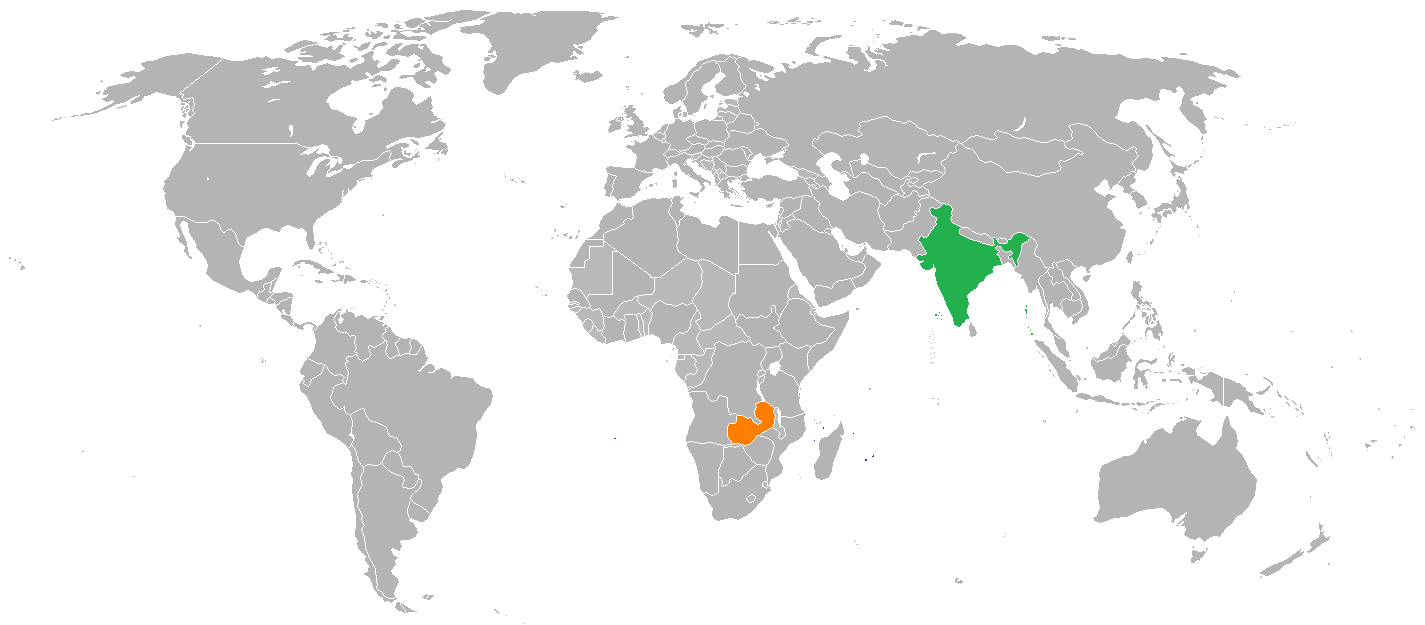
- India: Zambia

India–Zambia relations are bilateral diplomatic relations between the Republic of India and the Republic of Zambia. India maintains a High Commission of India in Lusaka that is concurrently accredited to Malawi while Zambia has a High Commission in New Delhi.

== History ==
India and Zambia have cordial relations. The Indian freedom struggle inspired Kenneth Kaunda and Zambia's independence movement. India has supported Zambia's economic and technological development while it has supported India on international fora on the issue of Jammu and Kashmir, terrorism and India's nuclear tests in 1998. Zambia has also extended support to India's claim for permanent membership of an expanded UN Security Council. Presidents Kaunda, Frederick Chiluba and Levy Mwanawasa have paid state visits to India while Presidents V V Giri, Neelam Sanjiva Reddy and R Venkataraman and Prime Ministers Indira Gandhi and Rajiv Gandhi have led Indian state visits to Zambia.

Vice President Hamid Ansari made an official visit in 2010 to Zambia where he extended India's incentives to Zambia.

In 2018, Indian President Ram Nath Kovind visited Equatorial Guinea, Swaziland, and Zambia from April 7 to 12 to strengthen relations with these countries. On April 10, he arrived in Lusaka, where he met Zambian President Edgar Chagwa Lungu. His agenda included discussions, a state banquet, interaction with the Indian community, and a business event.

== Economic ties ==
=== Trade ===
Trade between India and Zambia amounted to $200 million in 2010. Indian exports to Zambia include pharmaceuticals, transport equipment, plastics and chemicals while semi-precious stones, non-ferrous metals, ores (copper and cobalt) and raw cotton constitute Indian imports from Zambia. India and Zambia aim to increase this trade to $1 billion and Zambia has been seeking investments from India in its core economic sectors.

Bilateral trade between India and Zambia was $1 billion in 2016-17, with India mainly importing copper. Indian investments in Zambia reached nearly $5 billion, primarily in mining.

=== Investments ===
Since 2007, foreign direct investments from India into the Zambian economy has amounted to $3 billion. This includes a $2.6 billion investment by Vedanta Resources in Konkola Copper Mines, the establishment of a $300 million manganese processing plant by Taurian Manganese and Bharti Airtel's establishment of Airtel Zambia after its acquisition of Zain Telecom's African businesses.

=== Economic cooperation ===
India has for long extended government credit to Zambia to facilitate its development and trade between the countries. Support has included soft loans from India's Exim Bank and the donation of transport equipment, agricultural equipment and emergency medical supplies to Zambia. During Vice President Hamid Ansari's visit to Zambia in 2010, India extended lines of credit worth $125 million to Zambia to enable it to expand its power generation capacity and to establish the joint venture, 120 MW, Itezhi Tezhi hydropower project. Zambia is also part of the Duty Free, Quota Free (DFQF) regime for its exports to India as a Least Developed Country and part of the Government of India's lines of credit programme.

== Technical cooperation ==
India extends technical cooperation to Zambia for training its defence and civilian personnel through the Indian Technical and Economic Cooperation Programme. Indian armed forces personnel have also been deputed to Zambia to help train the Zambian armed forces. Several Zambian defence chiefs have been trained in India and since 1994 a Military Advisory Team of four Indian Army officers have been posted to the Defence Services Command and Staff College in Zambia.

India also provided lines of credit in various sectors and trained a significant number of Zambian armed forces personnel.

== See also ==
- Indians in Zambia
- Hinduism in Zambia
