= Chinese people in Zambia =

Total population
- 80,000 (2019)

Regions with significant populations
- Lusaka

Related ethnic groups
- Overseas Chinese

In recent decades, the population of Chinese people in Zambia has rapidly increased. There were 80,000 Chinese people living in Zambia according to a 2019 U.N. World Population study.

== History ==
There was significant temporary migration of thousands of Chinese workers from 1970 to 1975 to Zambia to build the TAZARA Railway, the largest aid project then. TAZARA Railway, was built to connect the mines on the Copperbelt Province of Zambia to the seaport of Tanzania.

== Business ==
With the take off in trade relations in the 2000s, growing from $100m in 2000 to $2.8 billion in 2010, Chinese investors in Zambia include large enterprises in mining and infrastructure, but also small business owners in areas like retail and even agriculture. The remarkable sight of a family of Chinese chicken farmers that moved to Zambia was the subject of a profile in the BBC News program From Our Correspondent with the reporter observing: "It sounds extraordinary but these Chinese businessmen and women spotted an opportunity to make a bit of money raising chickens on small farms in Zambia. They upped sticks and travelled 11,000km (7,000 miles) from their homes to do just that."

== Chinese investment in Mining in Zambia ==
China remains one of the major investors in the mining sector of Zambia. They have also widened their investments to mining support activities which has required experts from China.

In April 2005, An explosives factory at the site of a mine in Chambishi exploded killing over 50 workers, mostly Zambian. The incident and rapid increase in Chinese migration raised the level of discontent towards Chinese mining investors, turning the issue of Chinese investors and migration into a political issue during both the 2006 Zambian general election and the 2011.

=== 5,000 Mining jobs in 2018 ===
Zambia is a leading exporter of copper and Chinese investment in the mining sector has been considerable. Chinese investment in mines has accompanied the migration of Chinese owners and managers. In 2018, a Chinese firm launched a $832 million copper mine, setting Zambia's mining sector on a recovery path with 5,000 new jobs, and deepening ties between the Chinese and Zambian people.

== Population integration issues ==
=== Rapid population growth ===
There were 19,845 Chinese people living in Zambia in September 2014 according to the Home Affairs ministry in data provided to respond to questions raised in parliament.
In 2019, this number quadrupled to 80,000.

=== 2006 Race riots ===
During the 2006 election, Michael Sata the opposition presidential candidate lost after campaigning on rhetoric that China exploited the country and turned it into a "dumping ground." Following his loss, in his stronghold of Lusaka, rioting broke out against Chinese businesses.

In the following election in 2011, he would again campaign against Chinese investors, lambasting them for "taking over" Zambia.

=== 2010 Mine manager murder ===
Tensions have arisen between mine managers and local workers. In February 2010 a Chinese mine manager was murdered by a Zambian worker.

=== 2020 Closure of businesses following anti-Zambian discrimination ===
Three days after indefinitely closing Lantian restaurant in Lusaka's Longacres area for discriminating against Zambians, Lusaka Mayor Miles Sampa closed Chinese-owned Angels Barbershop at Arcades Shopping Mall for discriminating against local Zambians.

The Barbershop was also found displaying their prices in Chinese contrary to the Food and Health Act. “We had a tip off from a whistle blower who took his son to cut hair but was told K300 as price just to put him off. When he agreed to pay, they then changed their mind and said the Barbershop was actually closed and had to leave”, said the Mayor.

Later, in a statement released to the media, Mr. Sampa said that he had reviewed events last week and over the weekend as regards his monitoring and conduct towards some business houses and accepted his error in judgment of physically going to the business premises instead of engaging relevant offices and institutions.

=== 2020 Factory boss murders ===
The murder of three Chinese factory bosses in Zambia, allegedly killed by employees over the weekend, rekindled tensions over China's strong presence in the country. The local press reported the three victims, who were found dead in their burnt out factory, were killed by aggrieved employees of their textile business in Makeni, a suburb of the capital Lusaka.

== See also ==
- Demographics of Zambia
- Indians in Zambia
- China–Zambia relations
