= Zimbabweans in Zambia =

Zambian and international media estimate there to be tens of thousands of Zimbabweans in Zambia.

== Migration history ==
Around 2007, the number of Zimbabweans crossing the border into Zambia began to grow, rising as high as 1,000 per day from a previous average of sixty per day. By late 2007 and early 2008, there were roughly 10,000 Zimbabweans in Zambia. Numbers spiked sharply that year, as 25,000 Zimbabweans formerly living in South Africa fled across two borders to Zambia as a result of the May 2008 riots, ignoring a call by Robert Mugabe to return to their homeland. However, by the end of the month, only three had formally applied for political asylum. UNHCR estimated that a further 200 Zimbabweans were crossing into Zambia every day. The influx countered the trend of decreasing numbers of refugees in Zambia; the total numbers had fallen from 300,000 in the 1990s (the vast majority being Angolans, as well as Rwandans and Congolese) to around 113,000 due to repatriations.

Zambia also granted political asylum to twelve members of the Zimbabwean opposition party Movement for Democratic Change in advance of the second round of voting in the 2008 Zimbabwean presidential election. There was a thirteenth member of their group who was not granted asylum.

The large number of border crossers led to long queues at checkpoints near Victoria Falls as early as August 2007. The 2008–2009 Zimbabwean cholera outbreak led to further delays due to Zambian authorities' need to screen border-crossers for the disease.

== Employment ==
=== Cross-border trade ===
Many Zimbabweans in Zambia engage in shuttle trade, bringing products such as game meat, fruit, sweets, and mobile phones for sale. Zimbabweans living in the border area also cross Lake Kariba into Zambia in search of food, selling or bartering chickens for mealie meal. Zimbabwean cross-border traders who buy mealie meal in bulk in Zambia and then bring it back to Zimbabwe for sale have been blamed for food shortages in border areas.

=== White farmers ===
Among Zimbabweans who have moved to Zambia are a small number of white Zimbabwean farmers, whose numbers had reached roughly 150 to 300 people as of 2004. They farm a variety of crops including tobacco, wheat, and chili peppers on an estimated 150 farms. The capital they brought, combined with general economic liberalisation under the late Zambian president Levy Mwanawasa, has been credited with stimulating an agricultural boom in Zambia. In 2004, for the first time in 26 years, Zambia exported more corn than it imported. Zambia was considered the "easy option" for Zimbabwean farmers as compared to other potential destinations such as Malawi or Nigeria due to the close resemblance between the soil and climate of Zambia and that of Zimbabwe, as well as Zambia's relative stability; however, farmers who relocated to Zambia typically took on heavy debts denominated in Zambian kwacha while selling their produce abroad for U.S. dollars, which put them into difficulties when the kwacha appreciated almost one-third against the dollar in 2006.

Zimbabwean leader Robert Mugabe harshly criticised his Zambian counterpart Levy Mwanawasa for taking in the white farmers, whom he called "racist colonialists". Zambian agricultural minister Mundia Sikatana offered praise to the Zimbabwean farmers for training up locals, but implicitly warned them against racism, reminding them that "they have got to take their Zambian employees for what they are, human beings."

=== Other ===
The poor economy in Zimbabwe has also led foreign tourists hoping to see Victoria Falls to approach it from the Zambian rather than the Zimbabwean side. This has led to further tensions as Zimbabweans who formerly worked in tourism-related industries on their own side of the border have crossed over to the Zambian side and compete directly with their Zambian counterparts. The Zambian government has also expressed concern about the increasing numbers of Zimbabwean sex workers in the capital Lusaka. Other Zimbabweans working as street vendors or in other lines of employment report that they increasingly stereotyped as sex workers and subject to public opprobrium.

In June 2009, the Zambian government was also pursuing a plan to bring in Zimbabwean nurses as invited guest workers, but faced a strike brought by local health care workers over the issue. The government threatened to fire all the strikers.

== See also ==
- Demographics of Zambia
