= Religion in Zambia =

Religion in Zambia (2022 census)
1. Other Christian (74.5%)
2. Roman Catholic (17.9%)
3. Jehovah's Witnesses (5.60%)
4. No religion (1.30%)
5. Islam (0.50%)
6. Other (0.50%)

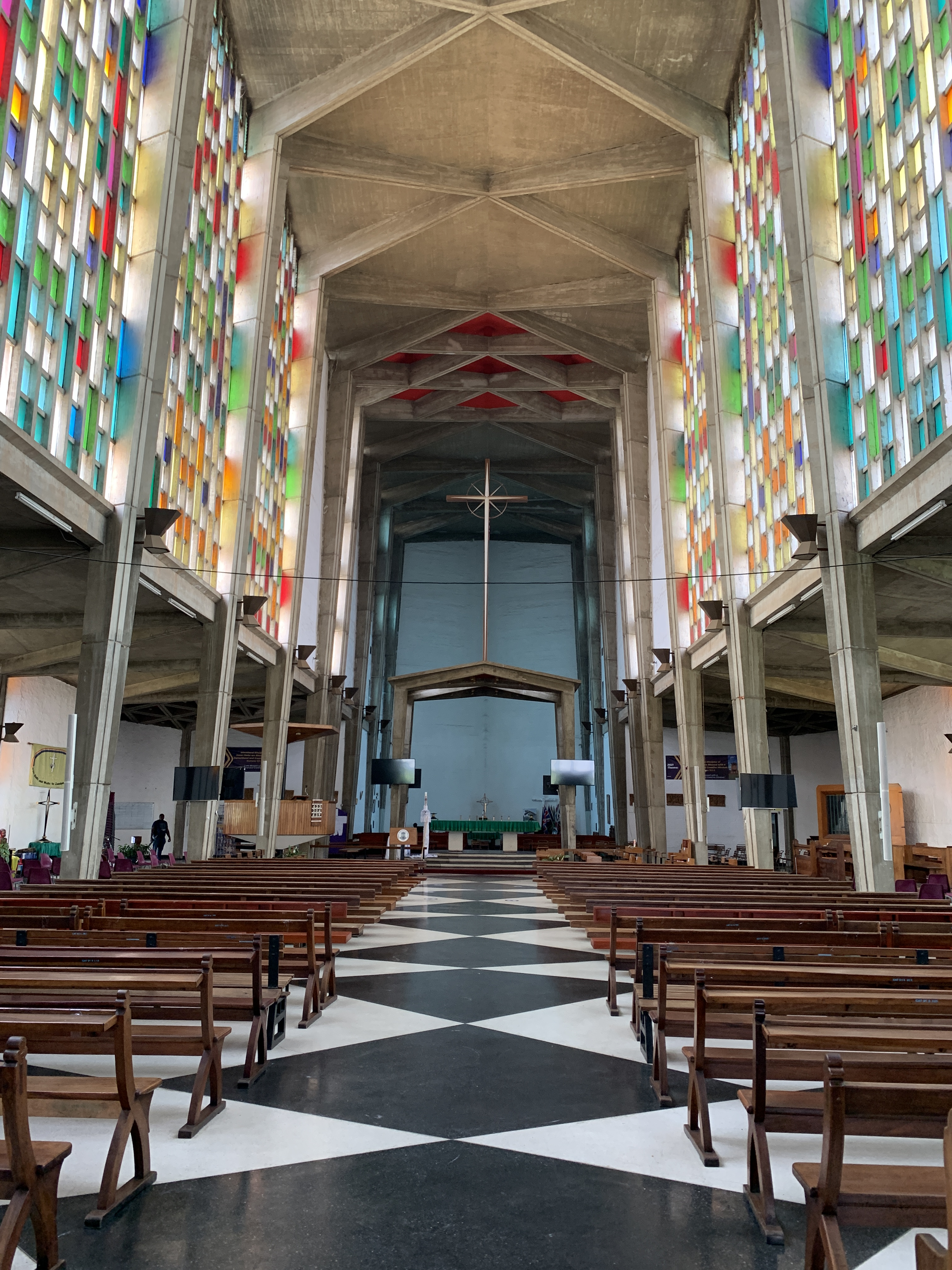
Interior of the Anglican Cathedral of the Holy Cross in the capital Lusaka

Christianity is the predominant religion in Zambia and is recognised as the state religion by the country's constitution. Before the arrival of European missionaries, the various ethnic groups residing in the territory of modern-day Zambia practised a variety of African traditional religions.

According to the most recent estimates, 75.3% of Zambians were Protestant, 20.2% were other Christians, 0.5% were Muslim, 2.2% followed other religions, and 1.8% had no religion.

== Background ==
Zambia gained independence in 1964 from the British Empire. After independence, Pentecostal and charismatic missionaries from the United States were met with a wide audience in the 1970s. The growth of the religion suffered during the 1980s and 1990s on account of increased economic turmoil. After Frederick Chiluba (a Pentecostal Christian) became President in 1991, Pentecostal congregations expanded considerably around the country. While the initial constitution did not specify religion, the amendment in 1996 declared the nation as "a Christian nation while upholding the right of every person to enjoy the person's freedom of conscience and religion". As per Article 1 of the constitution, the nation is a Sovereign Secular Republic and as per Article 25, citizens free to express thoughts and practise any religion.

In September 2021 the newly elected president, Hakainde Hichilema, disbanded the Ministry of National Guidance and Religious Affairs and put regulating religions under the control of the Office of the Vice President.

== Organization ==
The government requires religious groups to affiliate with a "mother body" which in 2021 were 14 in number. The Christian ones were the Zambia Conference of Catholic Bishops (ZCCB), the Council of Churches in Zambia (CCZ), and the Evangelical Fellowship of Zambia (EFZ), the Independent Churches of Zambia, the Apostles Council of Churches, the Seventh-day Adventist Church, and Christian Missions in Many Lands. The non-Christian ones were the Islamic Supreme Council of Zambia, the Hindu Association of Zambia, the Guru Nanak Council of Zambia, the Jewish Board of Deputies Zambia, the Rastafarians, the Council for Zambia Jewry, and the Baha’i Faith in Zambia.

== Christianity ==
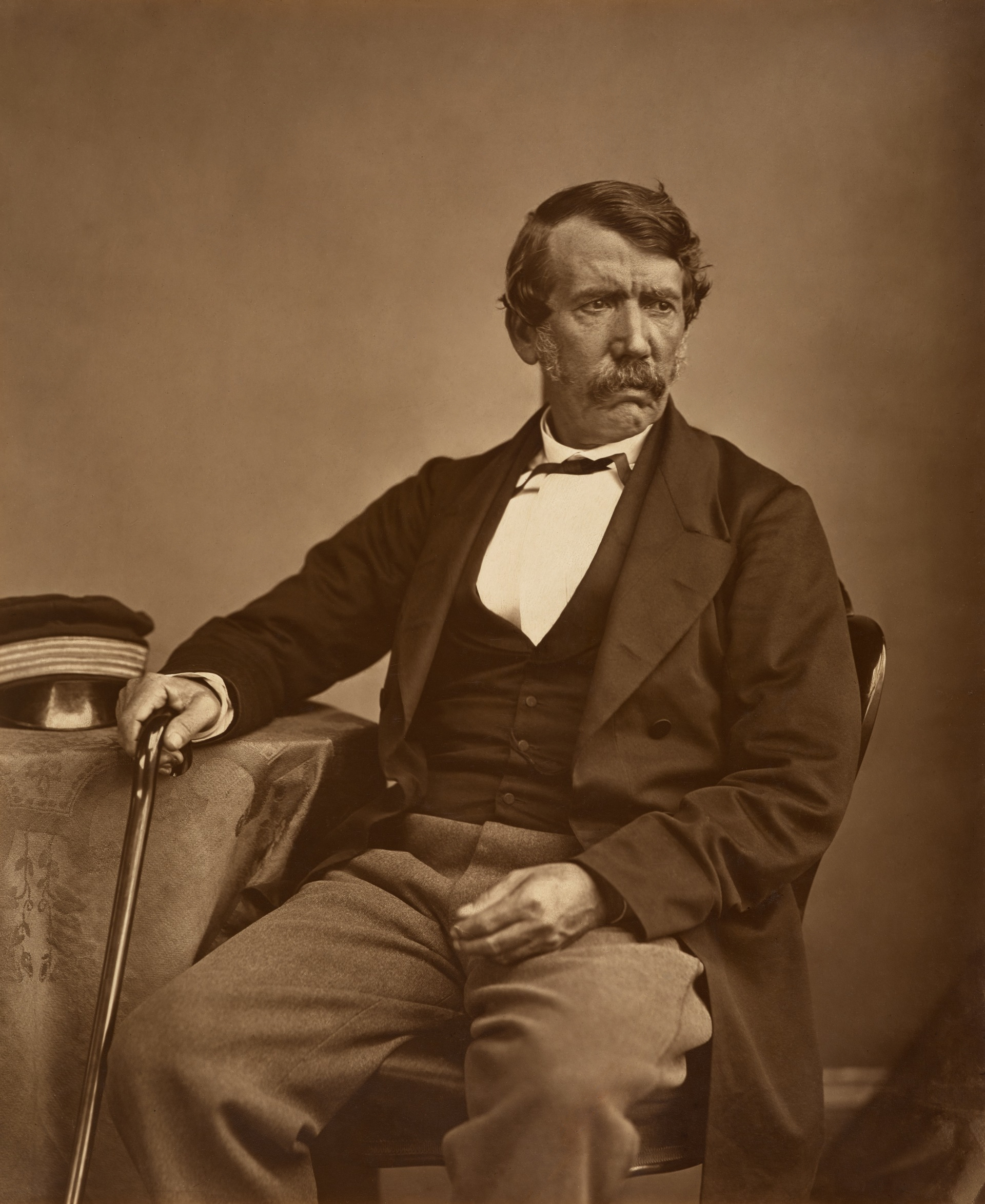
Portrait of David Livingstone

The 2022 census reported that 98.0% from Zambia's population are Christian, while 74.5% of Zambians are Protestant (mainly Pentecostal and Seventh day-Adventist), 17.9% were Roman Catholic and 5.6% were Jehovah's Witnesses.

Christianity is believed to have arrived in Zambia in the form of European Protestant missionaries and African explorers during the mid-19th century. David Livingstone was a Scottish missionary who did pioneering missionary work that brought the attention of Africa to the Western world. Livingstone inspired abolitionists of the slave trade, explorers and missionaries. He led the way in Central Africa to missionaries who initiated the education and health care for Africans. Many African chiefs and tribes held him in high esteem and it was one of the major reasons for facilitating relations between them and the British.

Zambia is officially a Christian nation according to the 1996 constitution, but a wide variety of religious traditions exist. Traditional religious thought blends easily with Christian beliefs in many of the country's syncretic churches. Christian denominations include: Presbyterianism, Catholic, Anglican, Pentecostal, New Apostolic Church, Lutheran, Seventh-day Adventist, Jehovah's Witnesses, The Church of Jesus Christ of Latter-day Saints, Branhamism, and a variety of Evangelical denominations. These grew, adjusted and prospered from the original Catholic missionary settlements (Portuguese influences) in the east from Mozambique and Anglicanism (English and Scottish influences) from the south. Except for some technical positions (e.g. physicians), Western missionary roles have been assumed by native believers. Zambia has one of the largest communities of Jehovah's Witnesses in Africa with over 200,000 members.

== Baháʼí Faith ==
The official website of the Bahá'í Community of Zambia reported 4,000 Bahá'ís in 2018 and the UNdata reported 3,891 Bahá'ís in 2015.

The William Mmutle Masetlha Foundation, an organization founded in 1995 and run by the Zambian Baháʼí community, is particularly active in areas such as literacy and primary health care. The Maseltha Institute, its parent organization, was founded earlier in 1983.

== Islam ==
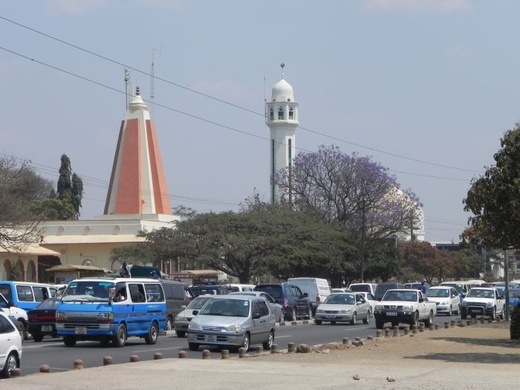
Hindu temple and mosque in Lusaka Province

Islam arrived in Zambia in the form of Arab slave traders during the mid-18th century. Other Muslims and people from the Hindu community arrived in Zambia (then known as Northern Rhodesia) during British colonial rule. In 2014, there were 100,000 Muslims in Zambia, representing 2.7% of the total population. The vast majority of Muslims in Zambia are Sunni. An Ismaili Shia community is also present. About 500 people in Zambia belong to the Ahmadiyya sect of Islam.

== Others ==
There is also a small Jewish community, composed mostly of Ashkenazis. Notable Jewish Zambians have included Simon Zukas, retired Minister, MP and a member of Forum for Democracy and Development and earlier the MMD and United National Independence Party. Additionally, the economist Stanley Fischer, who is both the former governor of the Bank of Israel and the former head of the IMF, respectively, was born and partially raised in Zambia's Jewish community.

Notable sects, such as the Alice Lenshina–led Lumpa Church and the newly established Last Church of Order also exist.

== Secular and Non-Religious Movements ==
Humanists & Atheists of Zambia (HAZ) was founded in 2018 by Larry Tepa, with Thasiyana Mwandila serving as Vice-President. The organisation promotes secular humanism and aims to normalise atheism in Zambia. In June 2019, HAZ announced a youth conference scheduled for October that year; the announcement prompted a social media post urging the Ministry of National Guidance and Religious Affairs to intervene. Larry Tepa left Humanist & Atheists of Zambia in 2021 to focus more on his work as the regional director of Africa of Atheist Alliance International and as the regional coordinator of Africa for Young Humanists International

In 2022, Larry Tepa founded the Ethical Society of Zambia (ESZ), a secular humanist organization focused on education, community development, and freedom of belief. Under his leadership, ESZ has supported literacy initiatives and engaged with international human rights mechanisms. In 2025, Tepa participated in consultations during the visit of the UN Special Rapporteur on Freedom of Religion or Belief to Zambia, providing perspectives on the experiences of nonreligious communities.

== Freedom of religion ==
In 2023, the country was scored 3 out of 4 for religious freedom.

== See also ==
- Church of the Province of Central Africa (Anglican)
- Catholicism in Zambia
- Council of Churches in Zambia
- Demographics of Zambia
- Religion in Africa
- Bibliography of the history of Zambia
