= Indians in Zambia =

Total population
- 25,000-30,000

Regions with significant populations
- Lusaka · Chipata

Languages
- Tamil · Telugu · Hindi · Gujarati · Punjabi · English

Religion
- Hinduism · Islam · Jainism · Sikhism · Christianity

Related ethnic groups
- Non-resident Indian and Person of Indian Origin · Desi

There is a small but recognisable community of Indians in Zambia. Unlike the better-known Indian communities of South East Africa, they were little-studied by historians until the 2000s.

== Migration history ==
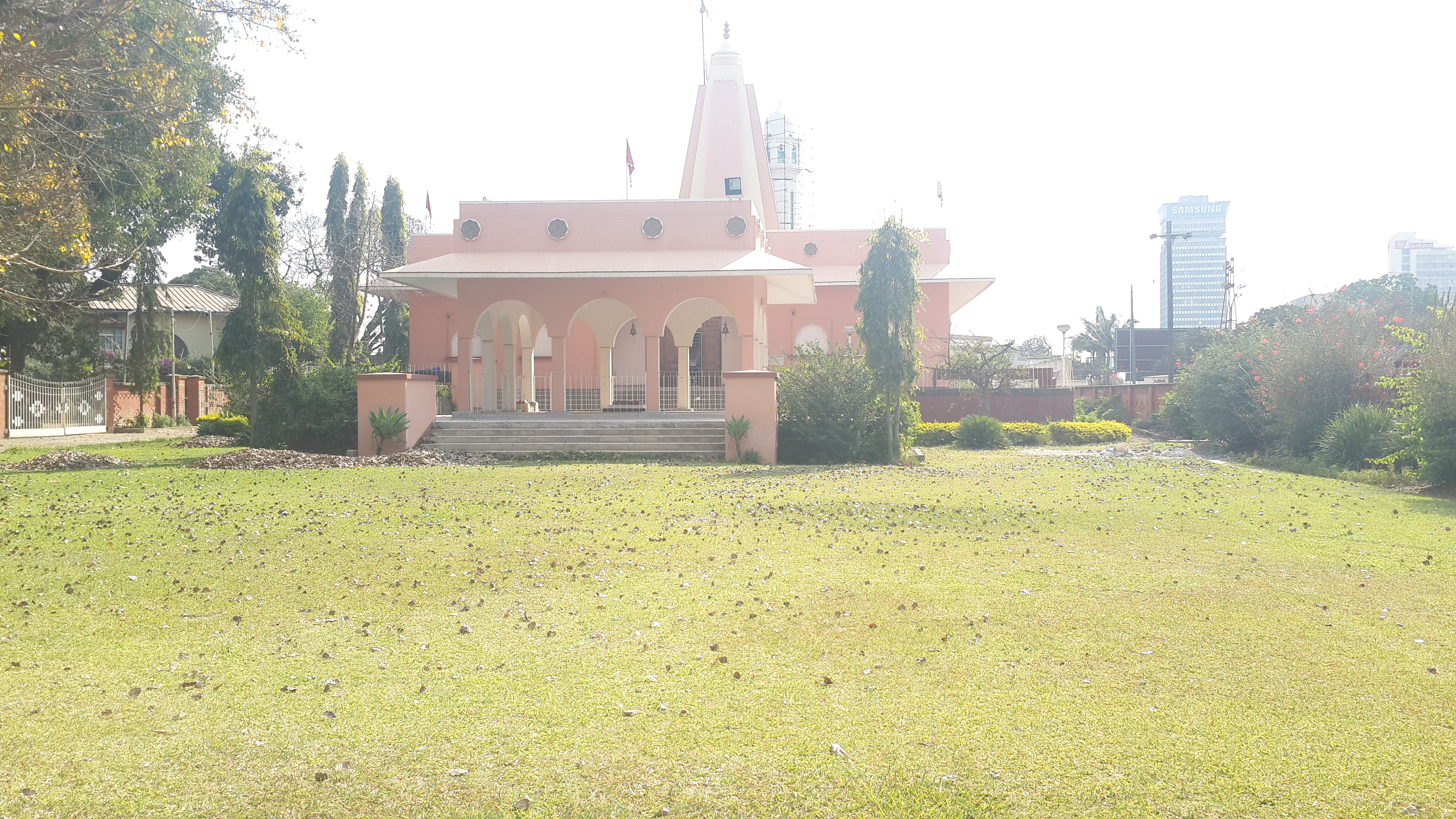
Lord Krishna Temple, Lusaka

Indians from Gujarat arrived in what was then the British territory of North-Eastern Rhodesia (later part of Northern Rhodesia and then Zambia) in 1905 via Bulawayo, Southern Rhodesia (now Zimbabwe) or the British Central Africa Protectorate (later Nyasaland, now Malawi). Unlike the population of Indians in South Africa, the proportion of indentured labourers among them was quite small; most instead were skilled artisans or businesspeople. Initial settlers were Muslims. They were followed by Hindu traders. Indians always formed a much smaller portion of the population than Europeans, but their numbers continued to increase until the 1950s; in 1930, the ratio of Europeans to Indians was 300:1, but by 1951 the proportion had shifted to just 10:1. One main driver for this was the expansion in Northern Rhodesia's mining industry in the late 1940s, which attracted demobilised white British servicemen as well as Indians. Immigration again accelerated around 1953, for fears that the new federal government of Northern Rhodesia would place restrictions on Indian migration.

The India Office had repeatedly expressed interest in sending a representative to British Central Africa to look after the interests of Indian emigrants, but permission was refused for fear that the presence of such a representative could stir up ethnic tensions between Indians and Europeans. Following Indian independence in 1947, the British High Commissioner to India proposed that one seat on Lusaka's legislative council be allocated to an Indian, but this suggestion was ignored and not further pursued. The Indian High Commissioner for British East and Central Africa was specifically warned "not to be the spokesman of Indians permanently resident". The Indian government, when it did voice complaint about issues of Indians in Africa, tended to focus on those in East Africa rather than Central Africa.

After Zambia achieved independence in 1964, the government started looking to India for material and moral support, and since then the Indian community has played a meaningful role in the Zambian economy. Most held Zambian or British citizenship. Many are in professions like banking, retail, farming and mining. Recent arrivals include medical and educational professionals. The Levy Mwanawasa government was friendly towards the Indian community; the functions hosted by the Indian community, such as Diwali, were attended by a number of cabinet ministers of the Mwanawasa government.

== Notable people ==
- Parbhu Nana, former cricketer with the East African cricket team
- Dipak Patel, Minister of Commerce and Industry under the Chiluba and Mwanawasa governments
- Sir Alimuddin Zumla, London-based professor of tropical medicine; parents of Gujarati origin
- Kiran C Patel - American philanthropist, serial entrepreneur, hotelier and cardiologist

== See also ==
- Hinduism in Zambia
- Islam in Zambia
- Demographics of Zambia
- India–Zambia relations
