= Alice Lenshina =

Zambian religious leader

- Lenshina in 1964
- Born: Alice Mulenga Lubusha; 1920; Kasama, Northern Rhodesia (Zambia)
- Died: 1978 (aged 57–58); New Chilenje compound, Lusaka
- Occupation: Leader of a religious sect
- Spouse: Petros Chintankwa
- Children: 5

Alice Lenshina (1920–1978) was a Zambian woman, prisoner of conscience and self-appointed "prophetess" who is noted for her part in the "Lumpa Uprising", which claimed 700 lives.

Lenshina founded and led the Lumpa Church, a religious sect that embraced a mixture of Christian and animist beliefs and rituals. The Lumpa Church rejected the authority of any "earthly government", it refused to pay taxes and it established its own tribunals. Shortly after Zambia became independent under President Kenneth Kaunda, she and her followers were engaged in the so-called "Lumpa Uprising". The uprising was suppressed and she was detained, but the Lumpa Church was never entirely eradicated.

== Origins ==
She was born Alice Mulenga Lubusha in 1920 in Chinsali district of the northern province of Northern Rhodesia. Alice was her baptismal name, while Mulenga was her traditional African name. Much information about her upbringing remains unknown. There are no further details on her mother beside her name, Musungu Chimba. Lubusha, her father, was a village policeman who fought for the British during World War I and was a messenger for the colonial administration. They were members of the Crocodile Clan, which was a distinguished clan of the Bemba kingdom.

The name "Lenshina" was a Bemba form of the Latin word "regina" ("queen"). She married Gibson Nkwale. After he died, she married Petros Chintankwa with whom she had five children.

Situated in a remote part of Northern Rhodesia, Chinsali district was a battleground for two competing Christian missions: the Roman Catholic Missionaries of Africa (the "White Fathers"), based at Llondola from 1934, and the United Free Church of Scotland, based at Lubwa from 1905. One of the Lubwa missionaries was David Kaunda, father of Kenneth Kaunda who became the first president of Zambia and who was a firm opponent of the Lumpa sect.

== 1953–1955 ==
Lenshina was a member of the Church of Scotland until she became very ill with cerebral malaria in September 1953 and fell into a deep coma. On regaining consciousness, she claimed that, during her coma, she met Jesus Christ, who gave her the task of spreading a special message. She became the focus of a revival movement at Lubwa mission, where she was baptized. Lenshina preached a Christian doctrine with baptism as the only observance. She attacked witchcraft and sorcery, and condemned the consumption of alcohol and the practice of polygamy. A grand temple was built at Zion (the name given to her home village) in 1958. Gradually the revival became a witchcraft eradication movement and evolved into an independent church called the Lumpa Church in 1955. The Lumpa Church was the answer for women who wanted more active leadership roles. The European missionaries were an often domineering presence that devalued African culture, especially the importance of women. According to Hinfelaar, the Lumpa Church resulted from the Bemba women’s reaction against the missionaries who kept confining them to subordinate positions.

The new church rapidly joined the competition for souls against the Roman Catholic Church and the Church of Scotland. Lumpa was so successful that by the late 1950s it may have had up to 150,000 members in the northern and eastern provinces of Northern Rhodesia. The church's drive for membership was so aggressive that it was seen as a political threat by the colonial Northern Rhodesia government.

== 1958–1964 ==
At first the Lumpa Church was close to the main Black organization fighting for independence, the Northern Rhodesia African National Congress (ANC). However, when Kenneth Kaunda left the ANC in 1958 and formed the more militant United National Independence Party (UNIP) there arose a competition for members between the new church and the new party. Villages were split as Lumpa leaders ordered their members to establish separate villages by moving out of villages where they lived alongside UNIP's members. The conflict between UNIP and the Lumpa Church reached a climax in July to October in 1964, just before Northern Rhodesia's independence. On July 24, 1964, a gunbattle broke out between UNIP and Lumpa Church members. The resulting riots were only quelled by the intervention of State troops, and the proclamation of a state of emergency by the new pre-independence Prime Minister, Kenneth Kaunda.

About a thousand people died in the clashes between Lumpa Church adherents, UNIP's members and the security forces. Approximately 15,000 Lumpa Church members fled and took refuge in Congo; some of them never returned to Zambia. The Lumpa Church was banned on 3 August 1964 and Lenshina surrendered to police a few days later. Hardly anyone faulted Lenshina for the violence that took place. This was evident when her biggest critic, Kaunda, never called for her trial in court. Even though she was the symbol for the Lumpa Church, she adamantly denied any involvement in the political disturbances. The political aspirations of her contemporaries took precedent over Lenshina's desire for a religious and cultural revival.

== 1964–1978 ==
Alice Lenshina herself played no significant role in the Lumpa Church's political activities. She regretted the fact that the political actions weakened the religious impact of her message, which stressed the sanctity of marriage, opposed both polygamy and traditional African folk magic and promoted the upliftment of common people, especially women. Lenshina never faced a trial but was detained by Kenneth Kaunda in Mumbwa district, beginning in August 1964. Her husband, Petros Chintankwa (who died in 1972), was detained with her. In 1965 they were moved to Kalabo district, near the Angolan border, but they escaped in October 1967. They were caught, jailed for 6 months and restricted in Mkushi district. In May 1970 Kaunda placed her in detention and ordered the destruction of her temple church in her home village of Kasomo. Finally she was released from detention in December 1975 but was put under house arrest in Lusaka's New Chilenje compound, Nkunda Road.

== Death ==
Lenshina died on 7 December 1978 while under house arrest and was eventually buried at Kasomo village where the Kamutola Church stood.

The Lumpa Church continues to exist to this day, though it is split and called by various names, the most prominent of which are Uluse Kamutola Church, under Chilemweni Nkonde (the biggest), Jerusalem Church, under Bubile (Daughter to Lenshina) and New Jerusalem Church, under Nkaya, in Kitwe's Chimwemwe Township.
