= Godfridah Sumaili =

Zambian cleric and former politician (born 1957

Minister of National Guidance and Religious Affairs
- In office 15 September 2016 – August 2021
- President: Edgar Lungu
- Preceded by: Position created
- Succeeded by: Position abolished
- Constituency: None (Nominated MP)

Personal details
- Born: 26 May 1957 (age 69) Northern Rhodesia
- Education: BSc in business administration MSc in business administration
- Occupation: Cleric

Godfridah Sumaili (born 26 May 1957) is a Zambian cleric and was the Minister of National Guidance and Religious Affairs for five years from September 2016. Sumaili did not seek election to Parliament, and received a nominated seat from Edgar Lungu on 15 September 2016.
