= List of countries by net reproduction rate =

The following list sorts countries and dependent territories by their net reproduction rate. The net reproduction rate (R_{0}) is the number of surviving daughters per woman and an important indicator of the population's reproductive rate. If R_{0} is one, the population replaces itself and would stay without any migration and emigration at a stable level. If the R_{0} is less than one, the reproductive performance of the population is below replacement level.

== List of countries (2023) ==
Countries and dependent territories by the net reproduction rate in 2023 according to the World Population Prospects 2024 of the United Nations Department of Economic and Social Affairs.

Country or territory	Rate
Democratic Republic of the Congo	2.599
Somalia	2.515
Central African Republic	2.510
Niger	2.508
Chad	2.413
Mali	2.362
Angola	2.299
Mayotte	2.238
Mauritania	2.172
Afghanistan	2.152
Burundi	2.147
Mozambique	2.146
Tanzania	2.118
Yemen	2.105
Uganda	1.982
Sudan	1.944
Cameroon	1.921
Benin	1.912
Republic of the Congo	1.909
Zambia	1.895
Ivory Coast	1.894
Equatorial Guinea	1.815
Togo	1.813
Ethiopia	1.804
Gambia	1.789
Burkina Faso	1.785
Samoa	1.779
Comoros	1.770
Senegal	1.764
Guinea	1.755
São Tomé and Príncipe	1.736
Liberia	1.736
Madagascar	1.730
Nigeria	1.722
Rwanda	1.714
Malawi	1.708
Eritrea	1.705
Gabon	1.704
Guinea-Bissau	1.688
Zimbabwe	1.686
Vanuatu	1.679
Solomon Islands	1.652
Uzbekistan	1.644
French Guiana	1.639
Sierra Leone	1.629
Pakistan	1.628
South Sudan	1.588
Iraq	1.526
Ghana	1.520
Namibia	1.504
Palestine	1.476
Tuvalu	1.471
Nauru	1.467
Tonga	1.467
Kenya	1.464
Tajikistan	1.438
Kazakhstan	1.435
Kiribati	1.400
Papua New Guinea	1.393
Israel	1.367
Marshall Islands	1.333
Kyrgyzstan	1.330
Saint Martin	1.315
Guam	1.315
Algeria	1.313
Egypt	1.303
Mongolia	1.285
Syria	1.271
Botswana	1.268
Federated States of Micronesia	1.264
Jordan	1.263
Tokelau	1.263
Eswatini	1.249
Turkmenistan	1.243
Timor-Leste	1.218
Oman	1.215
Haiti	1.204
Cambodia	1.201
Honduras	1.187
Bolivia	1.169
Lesotho	1.168
Niue	1.164
Djibouti	1.161
Paraguay	1.151
Guyana	1.142
Laos	1.120
Saudi Arabia	1.097
Guatemala	1.096
American Samoa	1.087
Northern Mariana Islands	1.079
Faroe Islands	1.074
Suriname	1.069
Nicaragua	1.067
Lebanon	1.064
Réunion	1.061
Morocco	1.061
Dominican Republic	1.056
Fiji	1.056
Libya	1.047
World	1.035
Seychelles	1.023
Monaco	1.023
South Africa	1.016
United States Virgin Islands	1.014
Western Sahara	1.013
Bangladesh	1.013
Guadeloupe	1.013
Panama	1.007
Indonesia	0.993
Venezuela	0.982
Martinique	0.979
Cook Islands	0.977
Myanmar	0.963
Belize	0.962
Sri Lanka	0.955
Peru	0.945
New Caledonia	0.944
Nepal	0.930
Mexico	0.917
India	0.915
Greenland	0.911
Gibraltar	0.900
Philippines	0.884
Bahrain	0.884
Vietnam	0.881
Palau	0.878
Tunisia	0.877
Ecuador	0.872
Georgia	0.863
Montenegro	0.863
El Salvador	0.848
Saint Vincent and the Grenadines	0.846
Qatar	0.841
Bulgaria	0.840
North Korea	0.835
Romania	0.825
Barbados	0.825
Brunei	0.824
Moldova	0.823
Falkland Islands	0.816
Armenia	0.811
Iran	0.809
New Zealand	0.803
France	0.794
Australia	0.793
Colombia	0.789
Saint Helena, Ascension and Tristan da Cunha	0.781
United States	0.781
Brazil	0.775
Turkey	0.772
Ireland	0.772
Azerbaijan	0.771
Aruba	0.769
Maldives	0.762
Antigua and Barbuda	0.762
Slovenia	0.760
Slovakia	0.752
United Kingdom	0.752
Iceland	0.744
Cayman Islands	0.740
Malaysia	0.739
Isle of Man	0.739
Kosovo	0.737
Cape Verde	0.736
Kuwait	0.734
Trinidad and Tobago	0.731
Denmark	0.730
Portugal	0.728
French Polynesia	0.723
Saint Kitts and Nevis	0.721
Serbia	0.718
Argentina	0.718
Hungary	0.716
Bosnia and Herzegovina	0.712
Grenada	0.711
Croatia	0.707
Caribbean Netherlands	0.705
Turks and Caicos Islands	0.704
Liechtenstein	0.703
Czech Republic	0.700
Dominica	0.700
North Macedonia	0.699
Russia	0.696
Germany	0.696
Montserrat	0.696
Sint Maarten	0.696
Switzerland	0.694
Netherlands	0.692
Sweden	0.691
Bhutan	0.690
Cuba	0.688
Bermuda	0.682
Norway	0.677
Uruguay	0.675
Wallis and Futuna	0.672
Cyprus	0.669
Belgium	0.668
Anguilla	0.665
Luxembourg	0.664
Saint Lucia	0.662
Bahamas	0.660
Guernsey	0.656
Jersey	0.656
Estonia	0.650
Canada	0.650
Jamaica	0.647
Greece	0.642
Latvia	0.641
Albania	0.641
Costa Rica	0.641
Austria	0.637
Poland	0.626
Finland	0.619
Saint Pierre and Miquelon	0.611
Mauritius	0.596
Japan	0.585
Spain	0.584
United Arab Emirates	0.582
Belarus	0.582
Lithuania	0.580
Italy	0.579
Thailand	0.576
Chile	0.564
San Marino	0.554
Malta	0.522
Andorra	0.519
Curaçao	0.516
British Virgin Islands	0.502
Vatican City	0.482
China	0.467
Ukraine	0.467
Singapore	0.455
Puerto Rico	0.455
Taiwan	0.417
Saint Barthélemy	0.389
South Korea	0.348
Hong Kong	0.343
Macau	0.317
