= Demographics of Zambia =

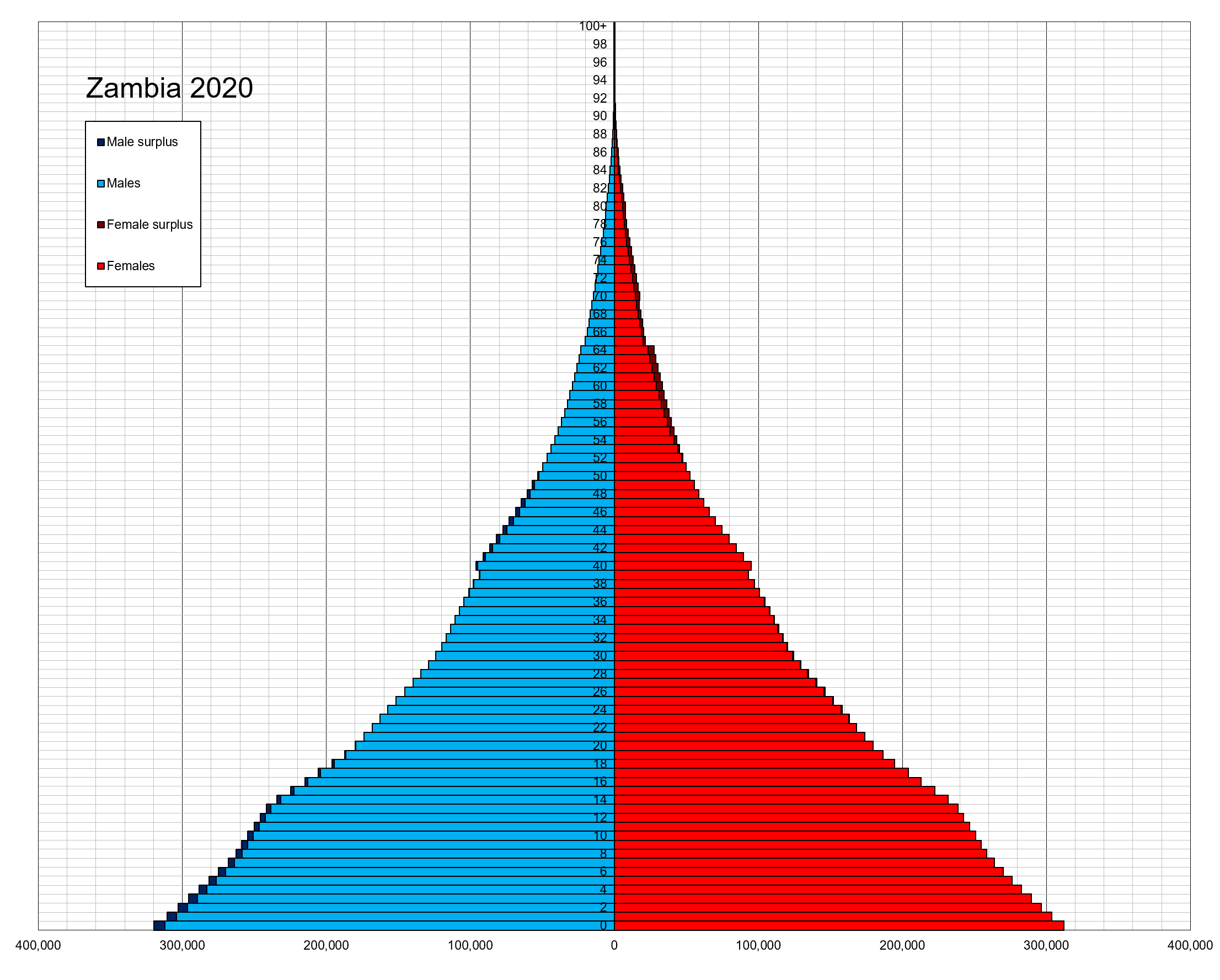
- Population pyramid of Zambia in 2020
- Population: 19,642,123 (2022 est.)
- Growth rate: 2.9% (2022 est.)
- Birth rate: 32.4 births/1,000 population (2025 est.)
- Death rate: 5.1 deaths/1,000 population (2025 est.)
- Life expectancy: 66.26 years
  - male: 64.52 years
  - female: 68.06 years
- Fertility rate: 3.97 children born/woman (2025 est.)
- Infant mortality: 37.11 deaths/1,000 live births
- Net migration rate: 0.24 migrant(s)/1,000 population

Sex ratio
- Total: 1 male(s)/female (2022 est.)
- At birth: 1.03 male(s)/female

Nationality
- Nationality: Zambian

Demographic features of the population of Zambia include population density, ethnicity, education level, health of the populace, economic status, religious affiliations and others aspects of the population.

Zambia's youthful population consists primarily of Bantu-speaking people representing nearly 70 different ethnicities. Zambia's high fertility rate continues to drive rapid population growth, averaging almost 3 percent annually between 2000 and 2010. The country's total fertility rate has fallen by less than 1.5 children per woman during the last 30 years and still averages among the world's highest, almost 6 children per woman, largely because of the country's lack of access to family planning services, education for girls, and employment for women. Zambia also exhibits wide fertility disparities based on rural or urban location, education, and income. Poor, uneducated women from rural areas are more likely to marry young, to give birth early, and to have more children, viewing children as a sign of prestige and recognizing that not all of their children will live to adulthood.

== Population ==
Census population
Year	Pop.	±% p.a.
1969	4,056,955	—
1980	5,661,801	+3.08%
1990	7,383,097	+2.69%
2000	9,855,591	+2.93%
2010	13,092,666	+2.88%
2022	19,693,423	+3.46%

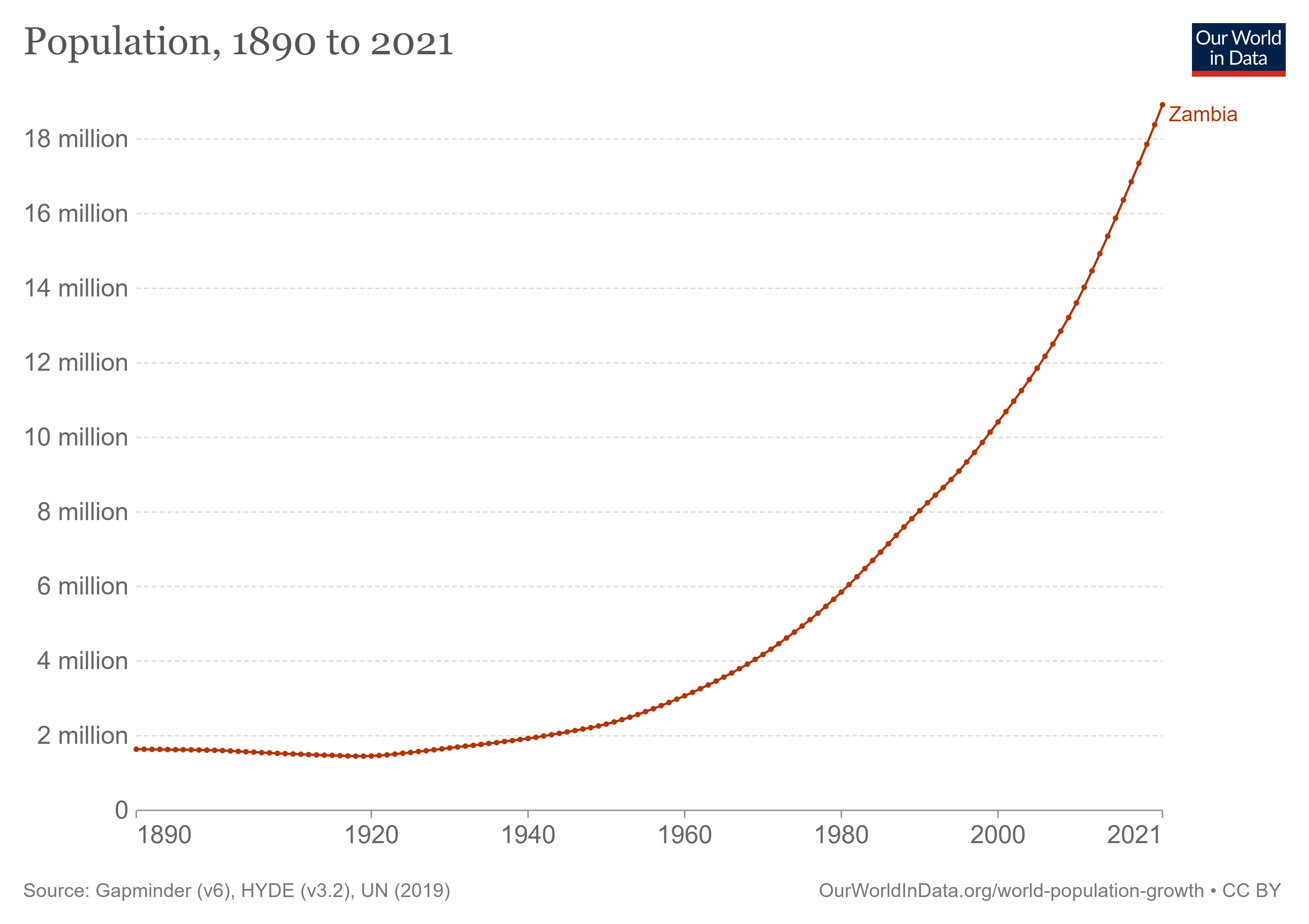
Zambia's population (1890–2021).

According to the 2022 revision of the World Population Prospects the total population of Zambia is 19,473,125 in 2021, compared to only 2,340,000 in 1950. The proportion of children below the age of 15 in 2010 was 46.4%, 50.6% was between 15 and 65 years of age, while 3.1% was 65 years or older.

	Total population	Population aged 0–14 (%)	Population aged 15–64 (%)	Population aged 65+ (%)
1950	2 340 000	44.9	52.3	2.7
1955	2 653 000	44.7	52.7	2.6
1960	3 045 000	44.9	52.6	2.5
1965	3 537 000	45.2	52.2	2.6
1970	4 139 000	46.4	50.9	2.7
1975	4 900 000	47.0	50.3	2.7
1980	5 775 000	47.3	49.9	2.8
1985	6 785 000	46.6	50.6	2.8
1990	7 860 000	45.8	51.4	2.8
1995	8 919 000	45.3	51.8	2.9
2000	10 202 000	45.3	51.8	2.9
2005	11 462 000	45.9	51.0	3.0
2010	13 089 000	46.4	50.6	3.1
2018	17,351,708			

Population Estimates by Sex and Age Group (01.VII.2020) (Data based on the 2010 Population Census.):

Age group	Male	Female	Total	%
Total	8 852 174	9 033 248	17 885 422	100
0–4	1 579 231	1 554 009	3 133 240	17.52
5–9	1 357 442	1 343 776	2 701 218	15.10
10–14	1 160 256	1 154 409	2 314 665	12.94
15–19	958 687	954 923	1 913 610	10.70
20–24	833 604	851 421	1 685 025	9.42
25–29	693 050	727 248	1 420 298	7.94
30–34	496 336	579 946	1 076 282	6.02
35–39	433 030	493 825	926 855	5.18
40–44	361 566	362 160	723 726	4.05
45–49	298 359	283 452	581 811	3.25
50–54	205 799	193 301	399 100	2.23
55–59	153 109	160 905	314 014	1.76
60–64	109 330	123 190	232 520	1.30
65-69	72 624	79 062	151 686	0.85
70-74	54 288	68 013	122 301	0.68
75-79	35 056	44 637	79 693	0.45
80+	50 407	58 971	109 378	0.61
Age group	Male	Female	Total	Percent
0–14	4 096 929	4 052 194	8 149 123	45.56
15–64	4 542 870	4 730 371	9 273 241	51.85
65+	212 375	250 683	463 058	2.59

== Vital statistics ==
Population, fertility rate and net reproduction rate, United Nations estimates

=== UN estimates ===
Registration of vital events is in Zambia not complete. The website Our World in Data prepared the following estimates based on statistics from the Population Department of the United Nations.

	Mid-year population	Live births	Deaths	Natural change	Crude birth rate (per 1000)	Crude death rate (per 1000)	Natural change (per 1000)	Total fertility rate (TFR)	Infant mortality (per 1000 live births)	Life expectancy (in years)
1950	2,318,000	113,000	46,000	67,000	48.6	19.7	28.8	6.62	135.9	45.12
1951	2,385,000	116,000	47,000	69,000	48.6	19.7	28.9	6.64	134.9	45.28
1952	2,454,000	119,000	48,000	72,000	48.7	19.4	29.2	6.68	132.9	45.68
1953	2,525,000	123,000	48,000	75,000	48.8	19.1	29.7	6.72	130.8	46.14
1954	2,600,000	127,000	49,000	78,000	48.9	18.9	30.1	6.76	128.9	46.53
1955	2,677,000	132,000	50,000	82,000	49.1	18.6	30.5	6.82	126.9	46.95
1956	2,758,000	136,000	51,000	85,000	49.3	18.4	30.9	6.87	124.8	47.37
1957	2,843,000	141,000	52,000	89,000	49.4	18.1	31.3	6.93	122.8	47.75
1958	2,931,000	146,000	52,000	93,000	49.6	17.8	31.8	6.99	120.8	48.23
1959	3,023,000	151,000	53,000	98,000	49.8	17.5	32.3	7.06	118.8	48.65
1960	3,119,000	156,000	54,000	102,000	49.9	17.3	32.6	7.12	116.9	49.04
1961	3,219,000	161,000	55,000	106,000	50.0	17.0	33.0	7.17	115.1	49.45
1962	3,323,000	167,000	56,000	111,000	50.1	16.8	33.3	7.21	113.6	49.79
1963	3,431,000	172,000	57,000	115,000	50.0	16.6	33.5	7.25	112.1	50.13
1964	3,543,000	177,000	59,000	118,000	50.0	16.7	33.3	7.27	111.7	49.85
1965	3,658,000	183,000	59,000	123,000	49.9	16.2	33.6	7.29	110.2	50.56
1966	3,778,000	188,000	61,000	127,000	49.7	16.1	33.6	7.30	109.7	50.68
1967	3,901,000	194,000	63,000	131,000	49.7	16.0	33.6	7.32	109.4	50.80
1968	4,029,000	200,000	64,000	136,000	49.7	16.0	33.7	7.33	108.8	50.86
1969	4,159,000	207,000	66,000	141,000	49.7	15.8	33.9	7.35	107.7	51.15
1970	4,282,000	214,000	67,000	147,000	49.8	15.5	34.2	7.37	106.0	51.49
1971	4,400,000	219,000	67,000	152,000	49.7	15.2	34.5	7.38	103.6	52.02
1972	4,524,000	225,000	67,000	158,000	49.6	14.8	34.9	7.39	100.8	52.63
1973	4,653,000	231,000	67,000	164,000	49.5	14.3	35.2	7.39	97.9	53.30
1974	4,789,000	237,000	67,000	170,000	49.3	13.9	35.3	7.38	95.5	53.87
1975	4,931,000	244,000	68,000	177,000	49.3	13.7	35.7	7.39	93.7	54.24
1976	5,080,000	250,000	69,000	182,000	49.1	13.4	35.7	7.37	92.8	54.60
1977	5,233,000	257,000	70,000	187,000	48.9	13.4	35.5	7.33	92.7	54.71
1978	5,391,000	263,000	72,000	190,000	48.6	13.4	35.2	7.29	93.0	54.61
1979	5,553,000	269,000	75,000	194,000	48.2	13.4	34.8	7.23	93.3	54.44
1980	5,720,000	273,000	78,000	196,000	47.6	13.5	34.1	7.15	93.8	54.14
1981	5,897,000	282,000	80,000	202,000	47.7	13.5	34.1	7.10	94.1	54.05
1982	6,091,000	291,000	83,000	208,000	47.8	13.6	34.2	7.06	94.6	53.86
1983	6,291,000	301,000	87,000	214,000	47.8	13.8	33.9	7.02	95.5	53.39
1984	6,488,000	310,000	92,000	218,000	47.7	14.2	33.6	6.98	97.0	52.76
1985	6,686,000	321,000	98,000	223,000	47.8	14.6	33.2	6.92	99.0	51.90
1986	6,891,000	330,000	104,000	226,000	47.8	15.1	32.8	6.85	101.0	51.06
1987	7,095,000	338,000	110,000	229,000	47.6	15.4	32.2	6.77	102.9	50.33
1988	7,294,000	347,000	116,000	231,000	47.4	15.8	31.6	6.68	104.4	49.53
1989	7,491,000	356,000	122,000	234,000	47.4	16.2	31.2	6.61	105.4	48.70
1990	7,686,000	363,000	128,000	235,000	47.1	16.6	30.5	6.53	106.1	47.93
1991	7,880,000	372,000	134,000	238,000	47.1	17.0	30.1	6.45	106.6	47.10
1992	8,074,000	381,000	140,000	241,000	47.0	17.2	29.8	6.36	106.4	46.51
1993	8,271,000	391,000	144,000	247,000	47.1	17.3	29.8	6.32	105.5	46.21
1994	8,474,000	401,000	148,000	253,000	47.1	17.4	29.8	6.27	104.0	45.85
1995	8,684,000	410,000	152,000	258,000	47.0	17.4	29.6	6.24	102.4	45.55
1996	8,902,000	418,000	156,000	262,000	46.8	17.5	29.3	6.18	100.9	45.23
1997	9,133,000	425,000	160,000	265,000	46.5	17.5	29.0	6.12	99.5	44.95
1998	9,372,000	435,000	164,000	271,000	46.3	17.5	28.8	6.05	98.1	44.70
1999	9,621,000	445,000	168,000	277,000	46.2	17.4	28.8	5.99	96.4	44.66
2000	9,891,000	454,000	167,000	287,000	45.9	16.9	29.0	5.93	93.5	45.23
2001	10,192,000	460,000	164,000	296,000	45.2	16.1	29.1	5.86	89.0	46.02
2002	10,508,000	470,000	161,000	310,000	44.7	15.3	29.5	5.79	83.5	46.98
2003	10,838,000	481,000	155,000	326,000	44.4	14.3	30.1	5.73	78.1	48.28
2004	11,188,000	496,000	150,000	346,000	44.3	13.5	30.9	5.72	72.7	49.49
2005	11,565,000	511,000	146,000	365,000	43.8	12.4	31.5	5.70	67.8	50.66
2006	11,972,000	526,000	143,000	384,000	43.7	11.7	32.0	5.68	63.7	51.80
2007	12,402,000	538,000	141,000	398,000	43.2	11.0	32.1	5.61	60.8	52.74
2008	12,853,000	552,000	137,000	415,000	42.6	10.4	32.2	5.53	58.3	53.95
2009	13,318,000	564,000	132,000	431,000	42.0	9.8	32.2	5.45	55.5	55.30
2010	13,792,000	576,000	127,000	449,000	41.4	9.3	32.1	5.36	52.9	56.80
2011	14,266,000	587,000	125,000	462,000	40.7	8.8	31.8	5.26	51.6	57.77
2012	14,745,000	595,000	122,000	473,000	39.9	8.4	31.5	5.14	50.4	58.87
2013	15,235,000	602,000	119,000	483,000	39.0	8.0	31.0	5.01	48.3	59.88
2014	15,738,000	607,000	117,000	490,000	38.1	7.7	30.4	4.89	46.7	60.70
2015	16,248,000	614,000	117,000	498,000	37.3	7.4	29.9	4.78	46.3	61.21
2016	16,768,000	624,000	116,000	508,000	36.6	7.2	29.4	4.67	44.9	61.79
2017	17,298,000	633,000	118,000	515,000	35.9	7.0	28.9	4.57	44.5	62.12
2018	17,836,000	643,000	120,000	522,000	35.5	6.8	28.7	4.49	45.0	62.34
2019	18,380,000	652,000	121,000	531,000	35.0	6.5	28.5	4.42	44.2	62.79
2020	19,059,000	656,000	119,000	536,000	34.4	6.3	28.1	4.32	41.4	63.4
2021	19,604,000	665,000	130,000	536,000	33.9	6.6	27.3	4.25	40.3	62.4
2022	20,153,000	676,000	113,000	536,000	33.5	5.6	28.0	4.17	39.3	65.3
2023	20,724,000	686,000	108,000	578,000	33.1	5.2	27.9	4.10	38.2	66.3
2024					32.7	5.2	27.6	4.04		
2025					32.4	5.1	27.2	3.97		

=== Demographic and Health Surveys ===
Total Fertility Rate (TFR) (Wanted TFR) and Crude Birth Rate (CBR) :

Year	Total			Urban			Rural		
Year	CBR	TFR	WFR	CBR	TFR	WFR	CBR	TFR	WFR
1992	45	6.5	5.4	44	5.8	4.7	46	7.1	6.2
1996	45.2	6.08	5.2	43.7	5.08	4.1	46.1	6.86	6.1
2001–2002	43.3	5.9	4.9	36.7	4.3	3.4	47.0	6.9	5.8
2007	43.6	6.2	5.2	36.3	4.3	3.6	47.5	7.5	6.3
2013–2014	37.2	5.3	4.5	32.2	3.7	3.3	40.3	6.6	5.6
2018	35.3	4.7	4.0	30.9	3.4	2.9	38.4	5.8	5.0
2024	32.1	4.0	3.6	28.4	3.2	2.8	35.3	4.9	4.4

View source data.
View source data.
View source data.
View source data.

Fertility data as of 2013–2014 (DHS Program):

Province	Total fertility rate	Percentage of women age 15-49 currently pregnant	Mean number of children ever born to women age 40-49
Central	5.9	8.1	6.8
Copperbelt	4.0	7.6	5.5
Eastern	5.8	8.7	6.9
Luapula	6.4	11.4	6.6
Lusaka	3.7	7.7	5.1
Muchinga	6.3	10.3	7.2
Northern	6.6	10.4	7.6
North Western	6.2	9.2	6.7
Southern	6.2	9.2	6.9
Western	5.6	8.1	6.0

=== Fertility rate by religion ===
At national level, the TFR was highest among women with no religious affiliation at 6.5. Among the women with religious affiliation Protestants had the highest TFR of 6.0, followed by Muslims with 5.9 and Catholics with 5.7.

Religious Affiliation	Total fertility rate
Protestantism	6.0
Catholicism	5.7
Islam	3.2
Hinduism	2.0
Other religions	5.8
Not religious	6.5
Zambia (total)	5.9

=== Life expectancy ===
Period	Life expectancy in Years
1950–1955	42.07
1955–1960	▲44.13
1960–1965	▲46.08
1965–1970	▲47.83
1970–1975	▲50.16
1975–1980	▲51.47
1980–1985	▼50.31
1985–1990	▼46.74
1990–1995	▼43.79
1995–2000	▼43.53
2000–2005	▲46.86
2005–2010	▲52.93
2010–2015	▲59.73

== Ethnic groups ==
Zambia is one of the most highly urbanised countries in sub-Saharan Africa with 44% of the population concentrated in a few urban areas along the major transport corridors, while rural areas are sparsely populated. Zambia's population comprises more than 72 Bantu-speaking ethnic groups. Some ethnic groups are small, and only two have enough people to constitute at least 10% of the population. The majority of Zambians are subsistence farmers, but the country is also fairly urbanised, with 42% of the population being city residents. The predominant religion is a blend of traditional beliefs and Christianity.

Immigrants, mostly British or South African, as well as some white Zambian citizens (about 40,000 in 2014), live mainly in Lusaka and in the Copperbelt in northern Zambia, where they are either employed in mines, financial and related activities or retired. Zambia also has small but economically important Indian and Chinese populations.

=== 2010 census ===
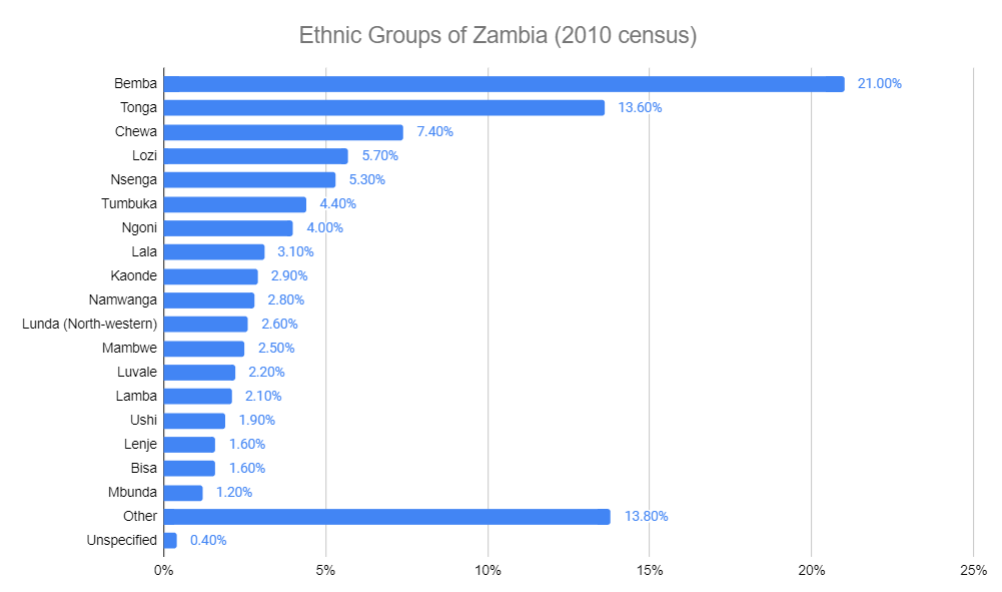

Groups	Percentage
African	99.2%
Bemba	21%
Tonga	13.6%
Chewa	7.4%
Lozi	5.7%
Nsenga	5.3%
Tumbuka	4.4%
Ngoni	4%
Lala	3.1%
Kaonde	2.9%
Namwanga	2.8%
Lunda (North-western)	2.6%
Mambwe	2.5%
Luvale	2.2%
Lamba	2.1%
Ushi	1.9%
Lenje	1.6%
Bisa	1.6%
Mbunda	1.2%
Other	13.8%
Unspecified	0.4%

== Languages ==
Bemba 33.4%, Nyanja 14.7%, Tonga 11.4%, Lozi 5.5%, Chewa 4.5%, Nsenga 2.9%, Tumbuka 2.5%, Lunda (North Western) 1.9%, Kaonde 1.8%, Lala 1.8%, Lamba 1.8%, English (official) 1.7%, Luvale 1.5%, Mambwe 1.3%, Namwanga 1.2%, Lenje 1.1%, Bisa 1%, other 9.7%, unspecified 0.2% (2010 est.)
note: Zambia is said to have over 70 languages, although many of these may be considered dialects; all of Zambia's major languages are members of the Bantu family

== Religion ==
Protestant 75.3%
Roman Catholic 20.2%
other 2.7% (includes Muslim, Buddhist, Hindu, and Baha'i)
none 1.8%

(2010 est.)

== See also ==
- Cultures of Zambia
- Angolans in Zambia
- Chinese people in Zambia
- Indians in Zambia
- Zimbabweans in Zambia
- Bibliography of the history of Zambia
