= Peter Chintala =

Zambian politician and diplomat

Ambassador of Zambia to Russia
- In office 2004–2009

Minister of Youth, Sport and Child Development
- In office 2001–2001
- President: Frederick Chiluba
- Preceded by: Syacheye Madyenkuku

Deputy Minister for Religious Affairs
- In office 1997–2001
- Preceded by: Post established

Deputy Minister of Youth, Sport and Child Development

Member of the National Assembly for Kabushi
- In office 1992–2001
- Preceded by: Abraham Makola
- Succeeded by: Nedson Nzowa

Personal details
- Died: 11 February 2019 Lusaka Zambia
- Party: Movement for Multi-Party Democracy

Dr Reverend Peter Lusaka Chintala (b. - d. 11 February 2019 in Lusaka) was a Zambian politician and diplomat.

== Biography ==
Chintala was born in the Copperbelt Province and graduated in 1990 from the Talbot School of Theology in La Mirada, California with a Master of Arts degree in theology. He died on 11 Febrbruary 2019 after undergoing medical treatment at Coptic Hospital in Lusaka Whilst Chairman and General Secretary of the Zambian Baptist Association, Chintala pastored two churches in Ndola, and in 1992 set up Free Baptist Churches of Zambia acting as President. In 1994, the Board of Trustees of Biola University awarded him a Doctorate of Divinity.

Chintala was selected as the Movement for Multi-Party Democracy candidate for the Kabushi constituency in a by-election in 1992, and was elected with a 2,386-vote majority. He was subsequently appointed Deputy Minister of Youth, Sport and Child Development. Chintala was re-elected in the 1996 general elections with a 7,871-vote majority. In 1997 he was appointed Deputy Minister for Religious Affairs in State House, a ministry he was in charge to set up.

In May 2001 he was appointed Minister of Youth, Sport and Child Development, succeeding to Syacheye Madyenkuku. However, in the December 2001 general elections he was defeated by Nedson Nwowa of the Heritage Party.

On 5 March 2004, President Levy Mwanawasa appointed Chintala Ambassador of Zambia to Russia. He presented his credentials to President of Russia Vladimir Putin on 5 October 2004. Resident in Moscow, Chintala had concurrent accreditation as ambassador of Zambia to Albania, Armenia, Azerbaijan, Belarus, Georgia, Kazakhstan, Kyrgyzstan, Moldova, Tajikistan, Turkmenistan, Ukraine and Uzbekistan.

Peter Chintala died on 11 February 2019 at Coptic Hospital in Lusaka.
