= Examinations Council of Zambia =

Zambian government agency

- Abbreviation: ECZ
- Formation: 1987
- Location: Lusaka
- Services: Examinations and academic assessments
- Website: www.exams-council.org.zm

The Examinations Council of Zambia (ECZ) was established under the Examinations Council of Zambia Act of 1983, to set and conduct examinations and award certificates to successful candidates. The Examinations are given to Grade 7 students before they move on to secondary examination, Grade 9 students as well as Grade 12 school leaving students. Additionally, the Examinations are taken by those that did not have the opportunity to have a formal education as part of leveling up for newer jobs and positions.

Compared to most contemporary examinations it ranks as harder in the scales.

== Qualifications ==
=== Junior Certificate Examination internal ===
==== Grading ====
Junior certificate of education for 2019

== See also ==
- General Certificate of Education (GCE)
- GCE Ordinary Level
