= Angolans in Zambia =

Total population
- 200,000 (2001) — decreased somewhat due to out-migration since that time

Regions with significant populations
- Zambezi · Mayukwayukwa · Meheba

There is a significant population of Angolans in Zambia.

== Migration history ==
With Zambia's 1964 independence from the British Empire, many members of national liberation movements in neighbouring countries, including Angola, found the country a hospitable base for their operations. However, eastern Angola (near the border with Zambia) was less densely populated than the northern region adjacent to Zaire (now the Democratic Republic of the Congo); Zaire and not Zambia thus because the primary destination for Angolan refugees in those days. Most of these refugees were of Balovale ethnicity, an ethnic group also present in Zambia. The Zambian government aimed to move them away from the border; they were settled first at Zambezi in North-Western Province and in Mayukwayukwa in Western Province. Later, due to ethnic tensions, those in Zambezi were transferred to Meheba near Solwezi (also in Northwestern Province). The refugee population reached roughly 25,000 by 1972, despite efforts by the Zambian government to control the influx and return new arrivals to Angola.

With the onset of the 1975 Angolan Civil War, the number of refugees began to expand, and repatriation efforts also came to a halt. Peace briefly returned to Angola with the 1991 Bicesse Accords and brought hope to the government that they could repatriate the refugees, but fighting resumed in 1992, resulting in a new influx. By the end of that year, the number of Angolan refugees had reached 101,779. The number would continue to expand; by 2001, it was estimated that there were 200,000 Angolan refugees in Zambia, making up about 77% of all refugees in the country. Rather than living in refugee camps or finding assistance through government resettlement schemes, many Angolan refugees settled on their own in Zambian villages.

In 2002, a peace deal was brokered which ended the war. By 2006, an estimated 63,000 had repatriated to Angola. However, the term "repatriation" itself may be misleading; one study of Angolans in Zambia found that they saw themselves simply as villagers; relocating from their villages in Zambia to Angola was not perceived as going home, but in contrast as leaving home in search of a better life.

== See also ==
- Demographics of Zambia
