= Gross reproduction rate =

Average number of daughters per woman if she survived all her childbearing years

The gross reproduction rate (GRR) is the average number of daughters a woman would have if she survived all of her childbearing years, which is roughly to the age of 45, subject to the age-specific fertility rate and sex ratio at birth throughout that period. This rate is a measure of replacement fertility if mortality is not in the equation. It is often regarded as the extent to which the generation of daughters replaces the preceding generation of women. If the value is equal to one that indicates that women will replace themselves. If the value is more than one that indicates that the next generation of women will outnumber the current one. If the value is less than one that indicates that the next generation of women will be less numerous than the current one.

The gross reproduction rate is similar to the net reproduction rate (NRR), the average number of daughters a woman would have if she survived her lifetime subject to the age-specific fertility rate and mortality rate throughout that period.

== Formulas ==
- $GRR=\Sigma ASFR_{f'}\times5$

*Note that we did not multiply by 1,000 because the results for individual women not per 1,000 women.

== See also ==
- Net reproduction rate
- Sub-replacement fertility
- Total fertility rate
