= Lumpa Church =

Christian new religious movement in Zambia

The Lumpa Church, an independent Christian church, was established in 1953 by "Alice" Lenshina Mulenga in the village of Kasama, Northern Rhodesia (Zambia). The church promoted a blend of Christian and traditional religious values and practices, including a belief in the role of women as spiritual mediums. Conflict between the church and the emerging, United National Independence Party, led to an uprising from July-October 1964.

== Origin ==
The group began with the ideals of Alice Mulenga Lubusha who rechristened herself Alice Lenshina or essentially "Alice Regina." She claimed to have undergone a temporary death, during which angels brought her before Jesus, who instructed her to return to earth as his witness and to be the bearer of a purifying message. This formation reflected a wider movement where African Indigenous churches were established by people who were unhappy with features of Christianity preached by missionaries. Lenshina's criticism of witchcraft, sorcery, polygamy, and alcohol made the Lumpa church popular. The group was what could be deemed the "eradication movement" in African religion. 'Lumpa' comes from the Bemba word, meaning 'excelling all others, most important.'

By 1955, Lenshina was leading a clear separatist movement, which spread from the Northern province into the Copperbelt, Broken Hill, and Lusaka. Members of the church contributed significant amounts of time and money. In 1958, cathedral was built in Kasomo, Lenshina's home village. They also maintained a strong allegiance which was seen in the Lumpa uprising in 1964. By the end of the 1950s membership was around 90,000 with 199 churches established in the north-eastern region.

== Conflict with UNIP ==
A large projected membership of around 60,000-90,000 was politically significant for the United National Independence Party (UNIP) organisers in the Northern province. From the late 1950s until 1961, the Lumpa movement was perceived as having a strong nationalist and anti-European elements. It was reported that prior to the formation of UNIP, the African National Congress (ANC) had promised the status of a national church. However, UNIP did not have any intention to follow this, and instead showed increased impatience with Lumpa religious practices, especially its emphasis on witchcraft and exorcism. Converts refused to obey state authorities and often clashed with members of UNIP.

The Lumpa church refused to pay taxes and formed its own villages which threatened traditional authority. Lenshina challenged the dominant nationalist party, UNIP, that was fighting against colonial rule in Northern Rhodesia. Lenshina had once supported the freedom of Africans from colonial rule, but after Kenneth Kaunda broke away from the ANC and formed UNIP in 1958, she was critical of this new party. Strong animosity between supporters of the ANC and UNIP resulted in violence, including stones thrown at houses and homes being burnt. Lenshina ordered her followers to leave their homes and establish separate villages. This led to clashes between members of the Lumpa church and UNIP supporters and the burning of many homes.

In 1962, after a year of visiting various Lumpa churches, Lenshina discovered her support had decreased because of the activities of UNIP. Immediately, she forbade members from joining the party and staged a public burning of UNIP party cards.

In 1963, Lenshina prohibited her followers from participating in political activity due to the belief it was a form of terrestrial witchcraft. This caused increased tensions with UNIP supporters and in 1963, there were numerous incidents where Lumpa churches were burnt and where Lumpa members raided in retaliation. A government deadline was set for the 20th of July 1964, where Lumpa church members were required to disarm and abandoned the fortified villages they had established. Kaunda held several meetings with Lenshina in an attempt at reconciliation. After winning the 1964 election, Kaunda gave the Lumpa church an ultimatum to abandon their settlements which caused the outbreak of civil war from July to October 1964.

== The Lumpa Uprising ==
On the 24th of July 1964, a gun battle broke out between UNIP and members of the Lumpa church. State troops were sent in by prime minister Kenneth Kaunda who declared it a state of emergency. Members of Lumpa church fought back and repelled government forces. A British and African police officer were killed after entering a Lumpa village as a part of patrol. Police retaliations resulted in the deaths of more than 30 Lumpa members. In response, Lumpa followers carried out attacks on neighbouring villages which provoked further retaliation from the local population. As the violence intensified, local police forces were supported by government troops who were instructed to disperse Lumpa communities and resettle inhabitants in their original pre-movement villages. The resistance they encountered led to heavy casualties and violence continued for approximately three weeks.

On August 11^{th}, Alice Lenshina agreed to surrender through a British mediator. She appealed to her followers via radio broadcast and leaflets distributed by government aircraft to cease resistance and to mark their villages with white circles to show their good intentions. In response, Kenneth Kaunda, announced a policy of no retaliation against Lumpa members. This announcement did not reflect the position of senior UNIP associates, who demanded that the army exterminate all the Lumpa’s. In the rural areas of northeast Zambia the fighting between state troops and the church’s members ceased in October 1964. It is estimated that between 700-1500 people. The biggest battle happened in October 1964. At Kasomo village more than 85 people were killed. In total more than 1,000 people were killed and 15,000 members of the Lumpa church fled and took refuge in Zaire. Fighting lasted for three months and ended with the church being banned and the arrest of Lenshina. In May 1970, Kaunda ordered the destruction of her cathedral in Kasomo village.

The Lumpa uprising was a severe setback and an embarrassment to the new UNIP government.

== Aftermath & Legacy ==
While the government condemned the churches fanaticism, heresy, and criminality, it sought to minimalise casualties, urged against civilian retaliation, and established rehabilitation and resettlement programmes. Lenshina was treated with respect, but her church was banned and she remained in custody. Despite government efforts, members of the church faces hostility and fled to the Democratic Republic of the Congo. By 1968, the population reached 19,000, although 3,000 returned to Zambia. The Lumpa church continues to exist to this day, although is split and called by different names. The most prominent are known as the Uluse Kamutola Church and the New Jerusalem Church.

== See also ==
- Alice Lenshina
- History of Church activities in Zambia
- New religious movement
