= Ministry of National Guidance and Religious Affairs =

Government ministry of Zambia

The Ministry of National Guidance and Religious Affairs was a ministry in Zambia. It was headed by the Minister of National Guidance and Religious Affairs.

The ministry was originally created as the Ministry for National Guidance. It was renamed the Ministry for Development and National Guidance after the Development portfolio was merged into it in 1970.

During the multi-party era, the ministry was initially created in 1997 as a desk in the Office of the President, overseen by a deputy minister. It became a full ministry in 2016. After the 2021 general election the ministry was dissolved and became a department of the Office of the Vice-President.

== List of ministers ==
Minister	Party	Term start	Term end
Minister for National Guidance
Justin Chimba	United National Independence Party	1968	1970
Minister for Development and National Guidance
Justin Chimba	United National Independence Party	1970	1970
Minister of National Guidance and Religious Affairs
Godfridah Sumaili	Patriotic Front	2016	2021

=== Deputy ministers ===
Minister	Party	Term start	Term end
Deputy Minister for Religious Affairs in State House
Peter Chintala	Movement for Multi-Party Democracy	1997	2001
