= Net reproduction rate =

Average number of daughters per woman with typical mortality rates

In population ecology and demography, the net reproduction rate, R_{0}, is the average number of offspring (often specifically daughters) that would be born to a female if she passed through her lifetime conforming to the age-specific fertility and mortality rates of a given year. This rate is similar to the gross reproduction rate but takes into account that some females will die before completing their childbearing years. An R_{0} of one means that each generation of mothers is having exactly enough daughters to replace themselves in the population. If the R_{0} is less than one, the reproductive performance of the population is below replacement level.

The R_{0} is particularly relevant where sex ratios at birth are significantly affected by the use of reproductive technologies, or where life expectancy is low.

The current (2015–20) worldwide estimate for the R_{0} under the UN's medium variant model is 1.09 daughters per woman.

== See also ==
- List of countries by net reproduction rate
- Sub-replacement fertility
- Total fertility rate
