= Nsenga language =

Bantu language spoken in Zambia and Mozambique

Nsenga
- Chinsenga
- Native to: Zambia, Mozambique, Zimbabwe
- Native speakers: 600,000 in Zambia and Mozambique (2006 – 2010 census); 16,000 in Zimbabwe (1969)
- Language family: Niger–Congo?: Atlantic–Congo; Benue–Congo; Bantoid; Bantu; East Bantu; Sabi; Nsenga

Language codes
- ISO 639-3: Either: nse – Nsenga phm – Phimbi
- Glottolog: nsen1242 Nsenga phim1238 Phimbi
- Guthrie code: N.41
- Linguasphere: 99-AUS-xf incl. varieties 99-AUS-xfa...-xfc

Nsenga, is a Bantu language of Zambia and Mozambique, occupying an area on the plateau that forms the watershed between the Zambezi and Luangwa river systems and Western Malawi land overshadowing Kachebere mountain called Mchinji. The language is part of the Sabi family of languages.
