= Lala-Bisa language =

Bantu language spoken in Zambia and DRC

Lala-Bisa
- Biza-Lala
- Native to: Zambia, Democratic Republic of the Congo
- Region: Central Province, Northern Province
- Ethnicity: Lala
- Native speakers: 350,000 in Zambia (2010) unknown but smaller number in DRC
- Language family: Niger–Congo?: Atlantic–Congo; Benue–Congo; Bantoid; Bantu; Sabi; South; Lala-Bisa
- Dialects: Ambo (Mbo); Luano; Swaka; Bisa (Ichibisa, Wiza); Lala (Ichilala)

Language codes
- ISO 639-3: leb
- Glottolog: lala1264
- Guthrie code: M.51–53,521–522

Lala-Bisa is a Bantu language of Zambia that is closely related to Bemba.

Swaka dialect is divergent, and sometimes classified as a separate language (Nurse 2003). Maho (2009) lists Biisa (Wisa), Lala, Ambo, Luano, and Swaka as distinct languages, with Ambo and Luano closest to Lala.
