= Outline of Zambia =

Landlocked country in Southern Africa

The Flag of Zambia

The Coat of arms of Zambia

The location of Zambia

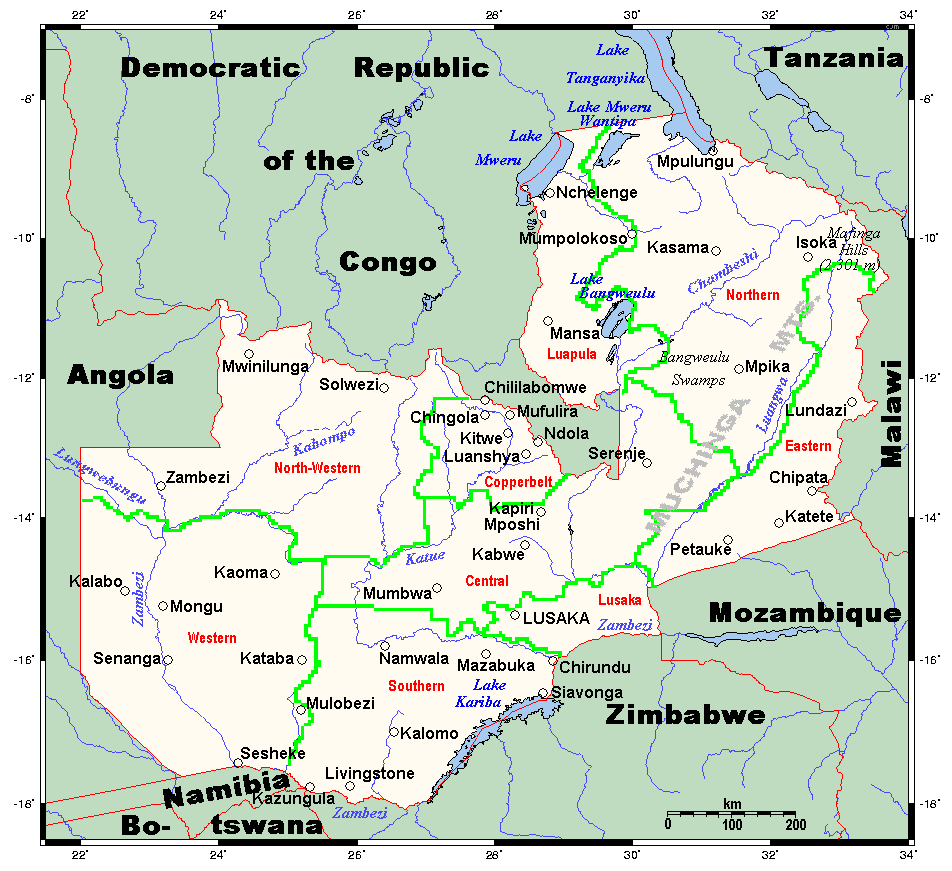
An enlargeable map of the Republic of Zambia

The following outline is provided as an overview of and topical guide to Zambia:

Zambia – landlocked sovereign country located in Southern Africa. Zambia has been inhabited for thousands of years by hunter-gatherers and migrating tribes. After sporadic visits by European explorers starting in the 18th century, Zambia was gradually claimed and occupied by the British as protectorate of Northern Rhodesia towards the end of the nineteenth century. On 24 October 1964, the protectorate gained independence with the new name of Zambia, derived from the Zambezi river which flows through the country. After independence the country moved towards a system of one party rule with Kenneth Kaunda as president. Kaunda dominated Zambian politics until multiparty elections were held in 1991.

== General reference ==
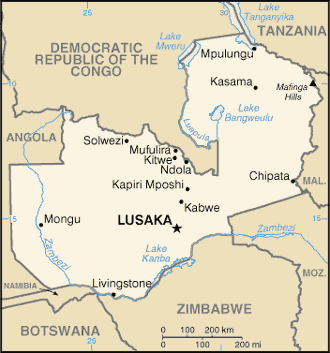
An enlargeable basic map of Zambia

- Pronunciation: /ˈzæmbiə/
- Common English country name: Zambia
- Official English country name: The Republic of Zambia
- Common endonym(s):
- Official endonym(s):
- Adjectival(s): Zambian
- Demonym(s): Zambian(s)
- Etymology: Name of Zambia
- International rankings of Zambia
- ISO country codes: ZM, ZMB, 894
- ISO region codes: See ISO 3166-2:ZM
- Internet country code top-level domain: .zm

== Geography of Zambia ==
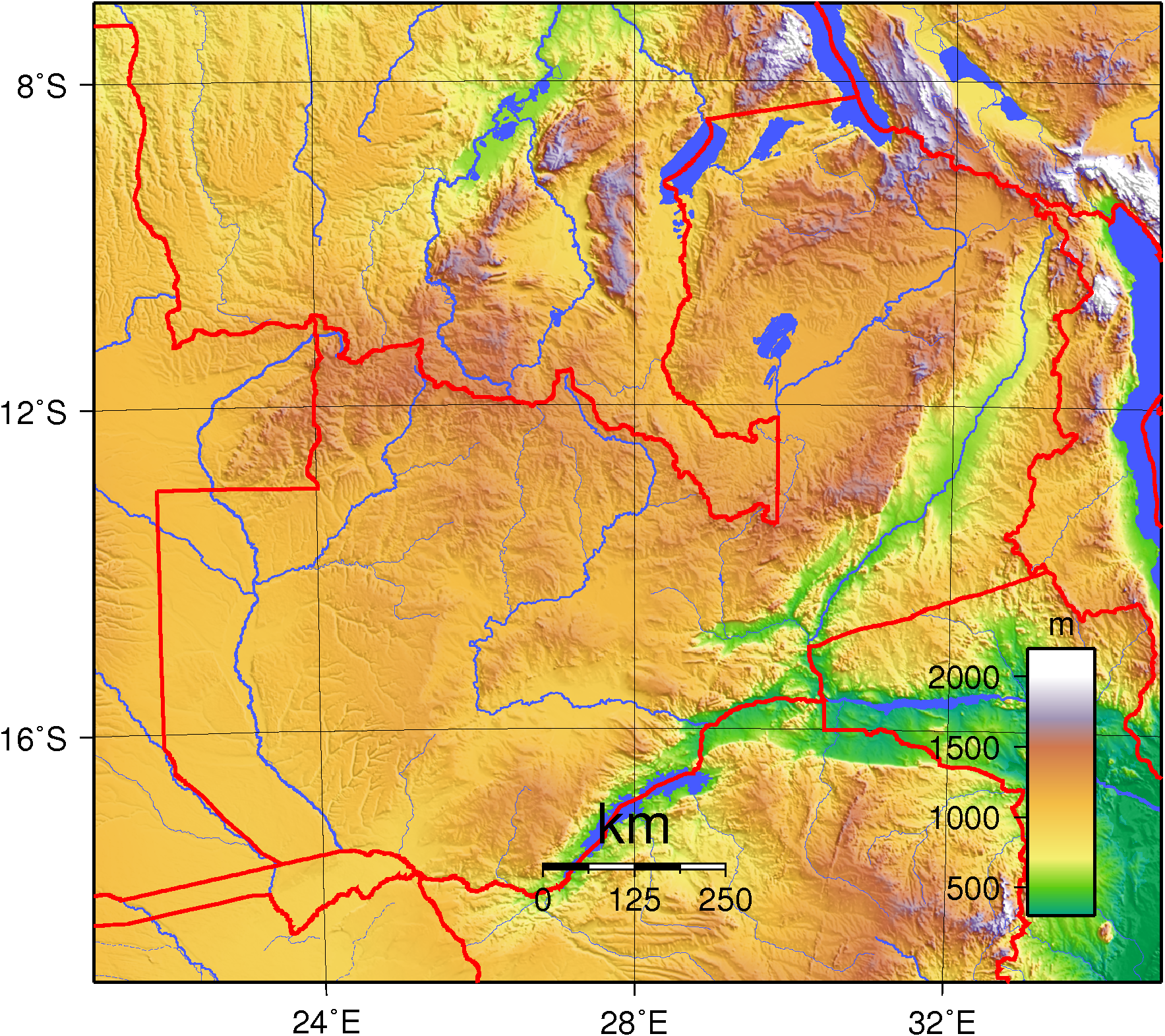
An enlargeable topographic map of Zambia

Geography of Zambia

- Zambia is: a landlocked country
- Location:
  - Eastern Hemisphere and Southern Hemisphere
  - Africa
    - East Africa
    - Southern Africa
  - Time zone: Central Africa Time (UTC+02)
  - Extreme points of Zambia
    - High: unnamed location in Mafinga Hills 2,329 m (7,641 ft)
    - Low: Zambezi 329 m (1,079 ft)
  - Land boundaries: 5,665 km

Democratic Republic of the Congo 1,930 km
Angola 1,110 km
Malawi 837 km
Zimbabwe 797 km
Mozambique 419 km
Tanzania 338 km
Namibia 233 km
Botswana 1 km

- Coastline: none

- Population of Zambia: 19,610,769 - 64th most populous country
- Area of Zambia: 752,618 km^{2}
- Atlas of Zambia

=== Environment of Zambia ===
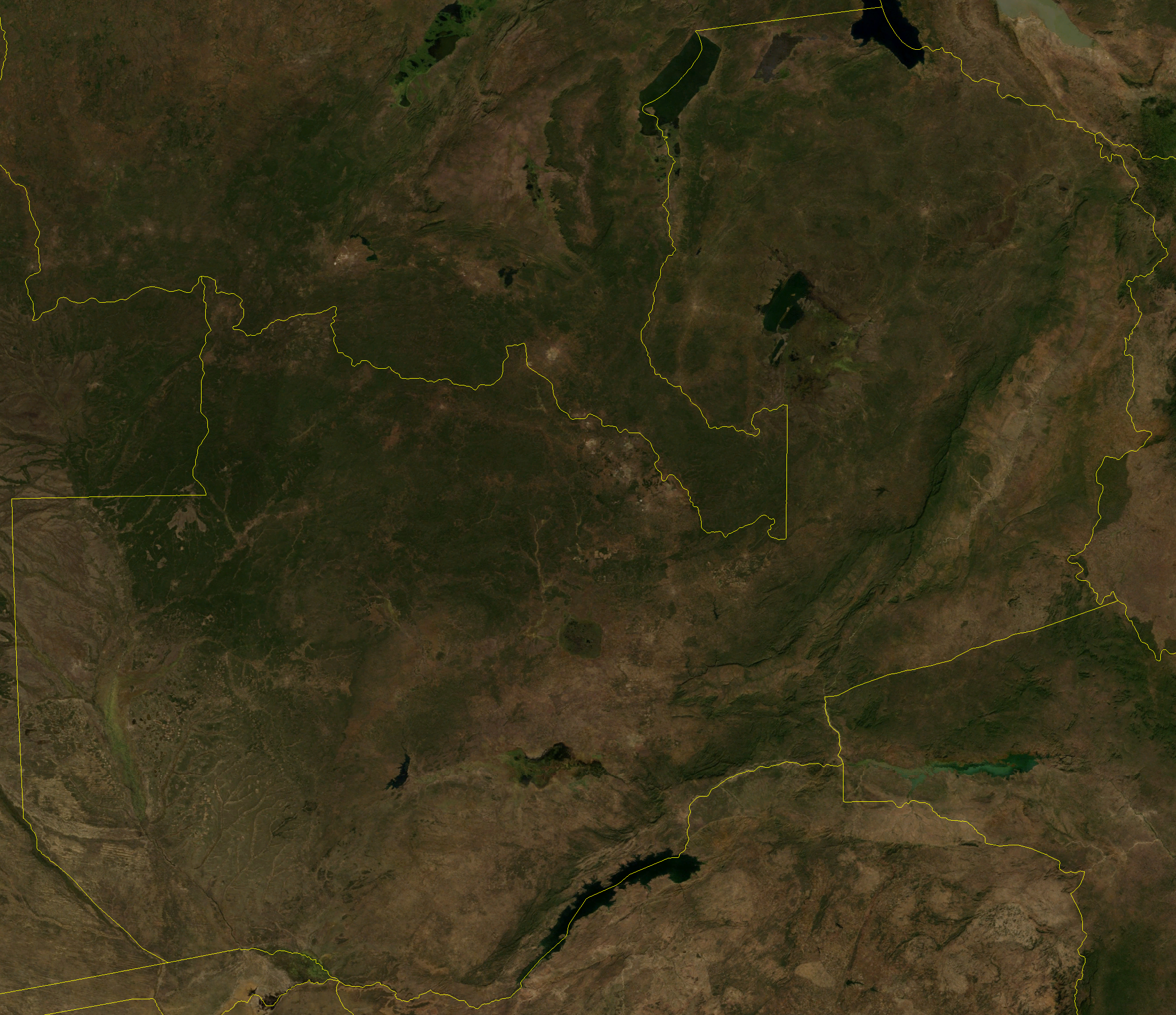
An enlargeable satellite image of Zambia

- Climate of Zambia
- Ecoregions in Zambia
- Protected areas of Zambia
  - National parks of Zambia
    - KAZA
    - Kafue National Park
    - Kasanka National Park
    - Liuwa Plain National Park
    - Lochinvar National Park
    - Lower Zambezi National Park
    - Luambe National Park
    - Mosi-oa-Tunya National Park
    - North Luangwa National Park
    - Nsumbu National Park
    - Nyika National Park, Zambia
    - South Luangwa National Park
    - Mweru Wantipa National Park
    - Sioma Ngwezi National Park
- Wildlife of Zambia
  - Fauna of Zambia
    - Birds of Zambia
    - Mammals of Zambia

==== Natural geographic features of Zambia ====
- Glaciers in Zambia: none
- Lakes of Zambia
  - Lake Bangweulu
  - Lake Kariba
  - Lake Kashiba
  - Lake Ishiba Ng'andu
  - Mita Hills Dam
  - Mulungushi Dam
  - Mofwe Lagoon
  - Lake Mweru
  - Lake Mweru Wantipa
  - Lake Tanganyika
  - Rift Valley lakes
- Rivers of Zambia
  - Chambeshi River
  - Congo River
  - Cuando River
  - Kabompo River
  - Kafue River
  - Kalambo River
  - Kalungwishi River
  - Luanginga River
  - Luangwa River
  - Luapula River
  - Luena River, Western Zambia
  - Lukasashi River
  - Lunga River (Zambia)
  - Lungwebungu River
  - Lunsemfwa River
  - Mbereshi River
  - Zambezi
  - Mulungushi River
  - Waterfalls of Zambia
    - Chavuma Falls
    - Kabwelume Falls
    - Kalambo Falls
    - Lumangwe Falls
    - Ngonye Falls
    - Ntumbachushi Falls
    - Victoria Falls
    - Mumbuluma Falls
    - Mutumuna Falls
    - Kabweluma Falls
    - Chishimba Falls
    - Kundalila Falls
- Wetlands
  - Bangweulu Wetlands
  - Lukanga Swamp
- World Heritage Sites in Zambia

=== Regions of Zambia ===
Regions of Zambia

==== Ecoregions of Zambia ====
List of ecoregions in Zambia

- Ecoregions in Zambia

==== Administrative divisions of Zambia ====
Administrative divisions of Zambia

- Provinces of Zambia
  - Districts of Zambia
    - Municipalities of Zambia

===== Provinces of Zambia =====
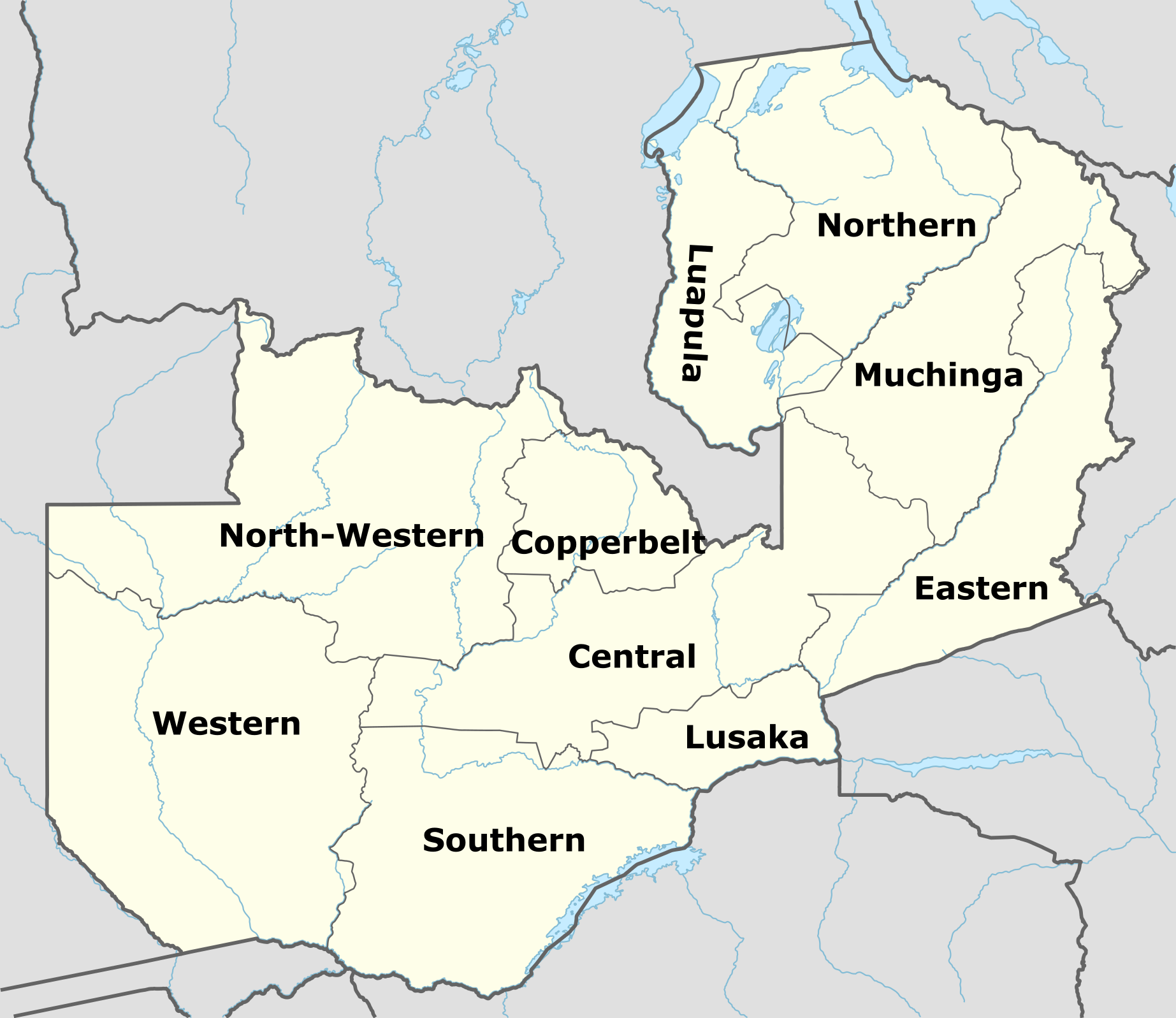
The provinces of Zambia

Zambia is divided into ten provinces:

- Central
- Copperbelt
- Eastern
- Luapula
- Lusaka
- Muchinga
- Northern
- North-Western
- Southern
- Western

The nine provinces of Zambia are divided into a total of 72 districts:

Central Province

- Chibombo
- Kabwe
- Kapiri Mposhi
- Mkushi
- Mumbwa
- Serenje

Copperbelt Province

- Chililabombwe
- Chingola
- Kalulushi
- Kitwe
- Luanshya
- Lufwanyama
- Mufulira
- Ndola

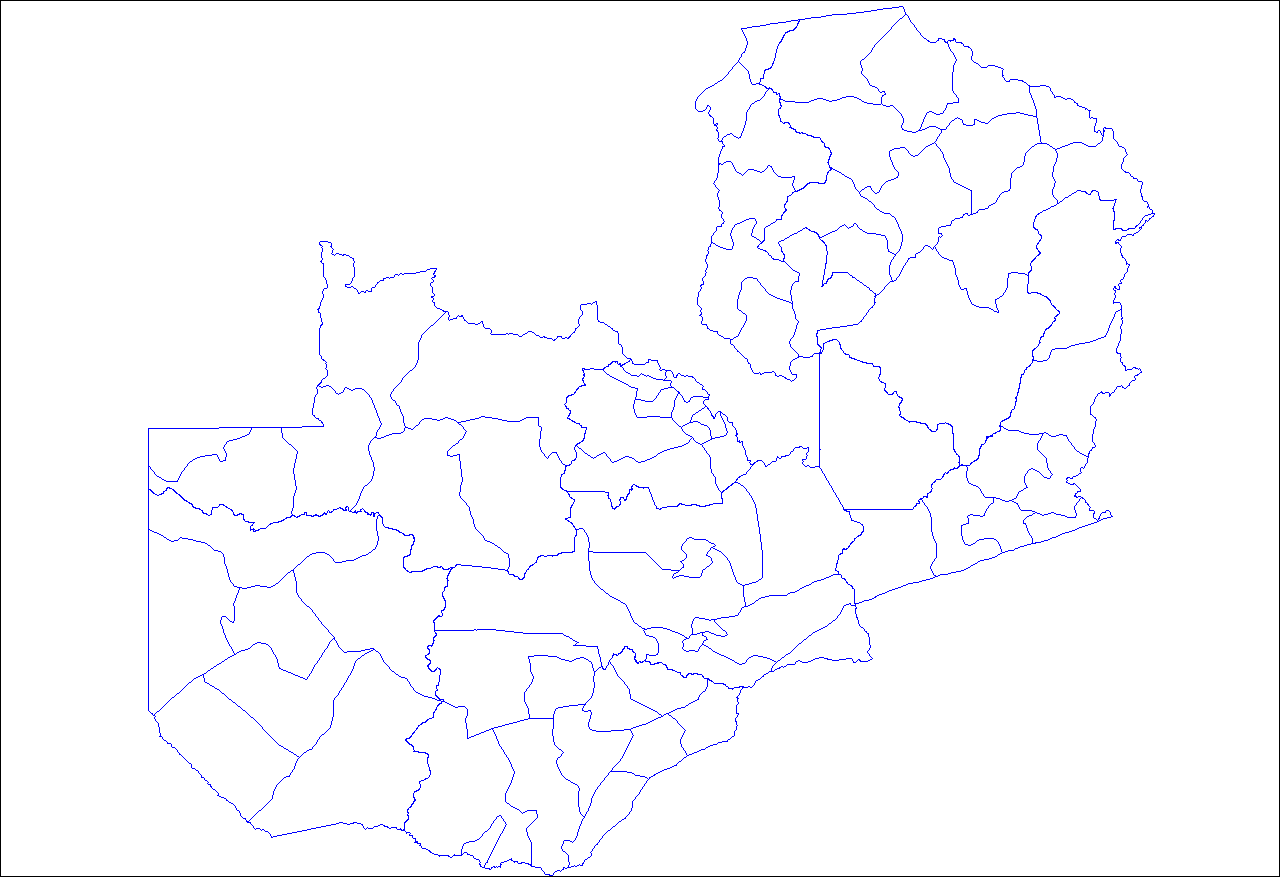
Districts of Zambia

Eastern Province

- Chadiza
- Chama
- Chipata
- Katete
- Lundazi
- Petauke

Luapula Province

- Chiengi
- Kawambwa
- Mansa
- Milenge
- Nchelenge
- Samfya

Lusaka Province

- Kafue
- Luangwa
- Lusaka

North-Western Province

- Chavuma
- Kabompo
- Kasempa
- Mufumbwe
- Mwinilunga
- Solwezi
- Zambezi

Northern Province

- Chilubi
- Chinsali
- Isoka
- Kasama
- Mbala
- Mpika
- Mporokoso
- Mpulungu

Southern Province

- Choma
- Gwembe
- Itezhi-Tezhi
- Kalomo
- Kazungula
- Livingstone
- Mazabuka
- Monze
- Namwala
- Siavonga
- Sinazongwe

Western Province

- Kalabo
- Kaoma
- Lukulu
- Mongu
- Senanga
- Sesheke
- Shangombo

- Capital of Zambia: Lusaka
- Cities of Zambia
- Lusaka
- Kitwe
- Ndola
- Kabwe
- Chingola
- Mufulira
- Livingstone
- Luanshya
- Kasama
- Chipata

=== Demography of Zambia ===
Demographics of Zambia

== Government and politics of Zambia ==
Politics of Zambia

- Form of government: presidential representative democratic republic
- Capital of Zambia: Lusaka
- Elections in Zambia
  - Zambian parliamentary election, 1991
  - Zambian presidential election, 1991
  - Zambian presidential election, 2001
  - Zambian parliamentary election, 2006
  - Zambian presidential election, 2006
  - Zambian general election, 2006
- Political parties in Zambia
  - List of political parties in Zambia
  - Forum for Democracy and Development
  - Heritage Party
  - Movement for Multiparty Democracy
  - National Citizens' Coalition
  - National Democratic Focus
  - Patriotic Front (Zambia)
  - Revolutionary Socialist Party (Zambia)
  - United Democratic Alliance (Zambia)
  - United Liberal Party (Zambia)
  - United National Independence Party
  - United Party for National Development
  - United Progressive Party (Zambia)
  - Zambia Alliance for Progress
  - Zambia Republic Party
  - Zambian African National Congress
- Taxation in Zambia

=== Branches of the government of Zambia ===
Government of Zambia

==== Executive branch of the government of Zambia ====
- Head of state and government: President of Zambia, Hakainde Hichilema
  - Vice President of Zambia, Mutale Nalumango

==== Legislative branch of the government of Zambia ====
- National Assembly of Zambia (unicameral)

==== Judicial branch of the government of Zambia ====
Court system of Zambia

- Supreme Court of Zambia
  - High court
  - Magistrate's court
  - Local courts

=== Foreign relations of Zambia ===
Foreign relations of Zambia

- Diplomatic missions in Zambia
  - United States Ambassador to Zambia
- Diplomatic missions of Zambia

==== International organization membership ====
International organization membership of Zambia The Republic of Zambia is a member of:

- African, Caribbean, and Pacific Group of States (ACP)
- African Development Bank Group (AfDB)
- African Union/United Nations Hybrid operation in Darfur (UNAMID)
- African Union (AU)
- Common Market for Eastern and Southern Africa (COMESA)
- Commonwealth of Nations
- Food and Agriculture Organization (FAO)
- Group of 77 (G77)
- International Atomic Energy Agency (IAEA)
- International Bank for Reconstruction and Development (IBRD)
- International Civil Aviation Organization (ICAO)
- International Criminal Court (ICCt)
- International Criminal Police Organization (Interpol)
- International Development Association (IDA)
- International Federation of Red Cross and Red Crescent Societies (IFRCS)
- International Finance Corporation (IFC)
- International Fund for Agricultural Development (IFAD)
- International Labour Organization (ILO)
- International Monetary Fund (IMF)
- International Olympic Committee (IOC)
- International Organization for Migration (IOM)
- International Organization for Standardization (ISO) (correspondent)
- International Red Cross and Red Crescent Movement (ICRM)
- International Telecommunication Union (ITU)
- International Telecommunications Satellite Organization (ITSO)
- International Trade Union Confederation (ITUC)
- Inter-Parliamentary Union (IPU)
- Multilateral Investment Guarantee Agency (MIGA)
- Nonaligned Movement (NAM)
- Organisation for the Prohibition of Chemical Weapons (OPCW)
- Permanent Court of Arbitration (PCA)
- Southern African Development Community (SADC)
- United Nations (UN)
- United Nations Conference on Trade and Development (UNCTAD)
- United Nations Educational, Scientific, and Cultural Organization (UNESCO)
- United Nations High Commissioner for Refugees (UNHCR)
- United Nations Industrial Development Organization (UNIDO)
- United Nations Mission in Liberia (UNMIL)
- United Nations Mission in the Central African Republic and Chad (MINURCAT)
- United Nations Mission in the Sudan (UNMIS)
- United Nations Operation in Cote d'Ivoire (UNOCI)
- United Nations Organization Mission in the Democratic Republic of the Congo (MONUC)
- Universal Postal Union (UPU)
- World Confederation of Labour (WCL)
- World Customs Organization (WCO)
- World Federation of Trade Unions (WFTU)
- World Health Organization (WHO)
- World Intellectual Property Organization (WIPO)
- World Meteorological Organization (WMO)
- World Tourism Organization (UNWTO)
- World Trade Organization (WTO)

=== Law and order in Zambia ===
- Law Enforcement in Zambia
- Constitution of Zambia
- Human rights in Zambia
  - Abortion in Zambia
  - Freedom of the press in Zambia
  - LGBT rights in Zambia

=== Military of Zambia ===
Military of Zambia

- Command
  - Commander-in-chief: President of Zambia
- Military forces
  - Zambian Defence Force
  - Army of Zambia
  - Navy of Zambia: None
  - Zambian Air Force

=== Local government in Zambia ===
Local government in Zambia

== History of Zambia ==
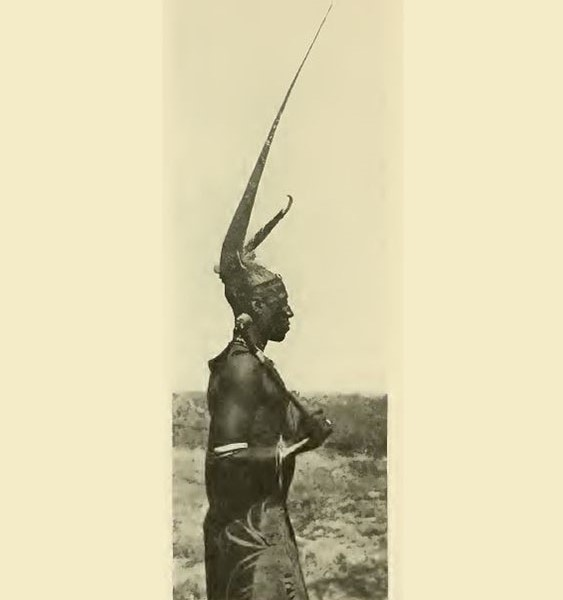
Ila Headman's son in Southern Zambia, Cattle formed an important part of their society.

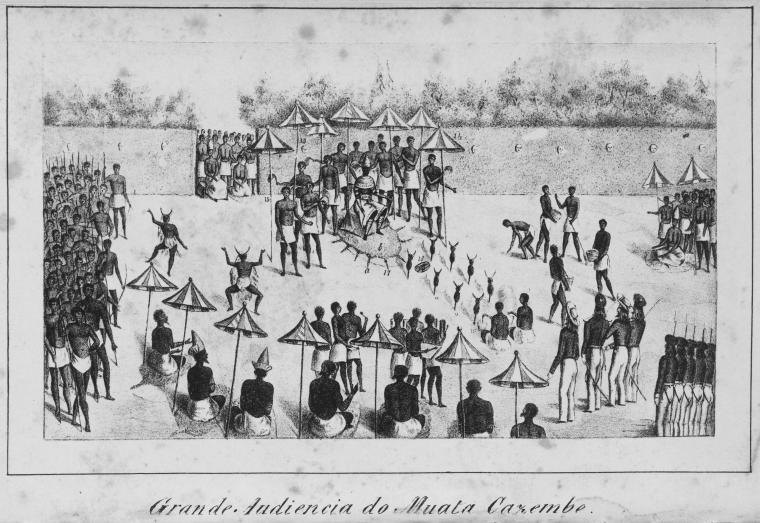
Drawing of the ruler of Lunda, Mwata Kazembe, receiving Portuguese in the royal courtyard in the 1800s

Flag of Northern Rhodesia

History of Zambia

- Current events of Zambia
- Military history of Zambia:

History of Zambia

- Africa House, The
- British South Africa Company
- British South Africa Police
- Cape to Cairo Road
- Copperbelt strike (1935)
- East African Campaign (World War I)
- Federation of Rhodesia and Nyasaland
- Federation of Rhodesia and Nyasaland election, 1953
- Governor-General of the Federation of Rhodesia and Nyasaland
- Governor of Northern Rhodesia
- History of Africa
- History of Church activities in Zambia
- Luapula Province border dispute
- Lunda Empire
- Mulungushi
- Mwata Yamvo
- North-Eastern Rhodesia
- Northern Rhodesia
- Northern Rhodesian African National Congress
- North-Western Rhodesia
- Old Drift cemetery
- Rhodesia (disambiguation)
- Rhodesia and Nyasaland pound
- Rhodesian Man
- Stairs Expedition
- The Africa House
- Zambia Independence Act 1964
- Zambian pound

=== Archaeological sites ===
See also Kalambo Falls in the Geography list above

- Ing-ombe Ilede
- Mumbwa Caves
- Gwisho Hot-Springs

=== Disasters ===
- 1977 Dan-Air Boeing 707 crash

=== Topic ===
- History of rail transport in Zambia
- History of the Jews in Zambia
- Postage stamps and postal history of Zambia

== Culture of Zambia ==
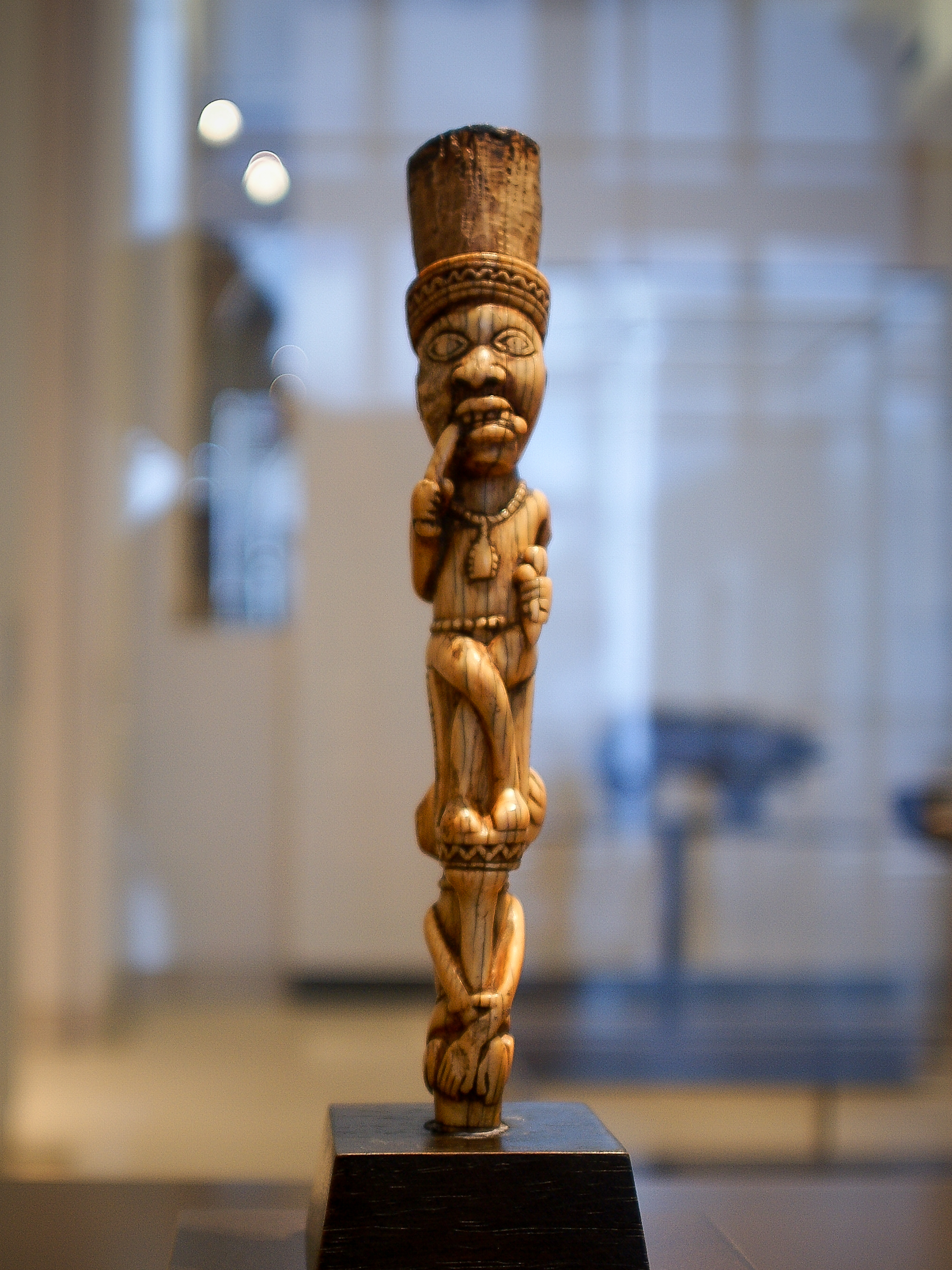
A Yombe sculpture, 19th century

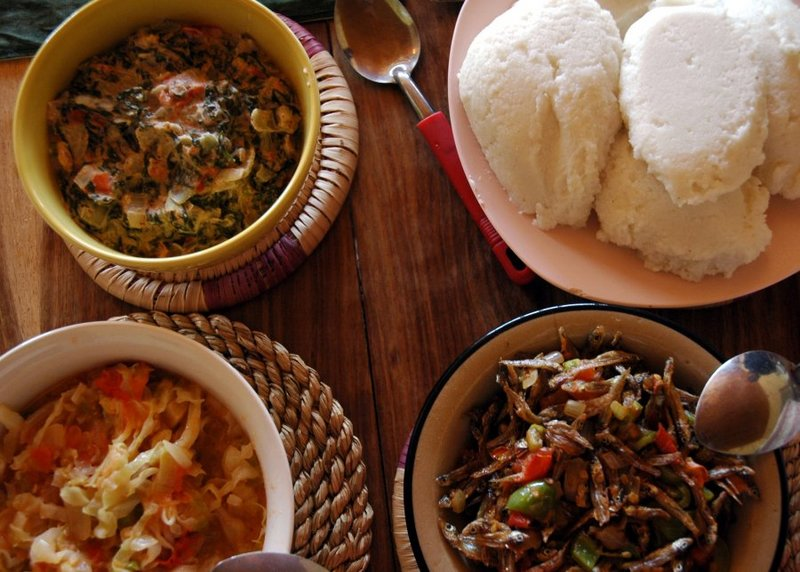
Nsima (top right corner) with three types of relish

- Cuisine of Zambia
- Media in Zambia
- National symbols of Zambia
  - Coat of arms of Zambia
  - Flag of Zambia
  - National Anthem of Zambia
- Prostitution in Zambia
- Public holidays in Zambia
- Scouting in Zambia
  - Girl Guides Association of Zambia
  - Zambia Scouts Association
- World Heritage Sites in Zambia
- Miscellaneous
  - Ibwatu
  - Kuomboka
  - Lwiindi
  - Mangwe
  - Nshima
  - Nsolo
  - Tonga baskets
  - Zambian traditional ceremonies

=== Art in Zambia ===
- Music of Zambia
- Theatre in Zambia

==== Music of Zambia ====
Music of Zambia

- Kalindula
- National Arts Council of Zambia
- Ngoma Music Award
- Silimba
- Zamrock

===== Musical groups =====
- Amayenge
- Distro Kuomboka
- Mashombe Blue Jeans

=== Languages of Zambia ===
Languages of Zambia

- Bemba language
- Chichewa language
- Cilungu
- Fanagalo
- Kaonde language
- Lamba language
- Lozi language
- Kaonde language
- Lunda language
- Mambwe language
- Nkoya language
- Shona language
- Tonga language (Zambia)
- Tumbuka language
- Yauma language

=== People of Zambia ===
People of Zambia

- Ethnic groups
  - Ba Yombe
  - Balovale
  - Bemba people
  - British diaspora in Africa
  - Chewa people
  - Chokwe
  - Eastern Lunda
  - Kanongesha-Lunda
  - Kazembe-Lunda
  - Lozi people
  - Lunda people
  - Mambwe
  - Mwanga (ethnic group)
  - Namwanga
  - Ngoni people
  - Nsenga people
  - Nyamwanga
  - Nyiha
  - Rungu (African ethnic group)
  - Tokaleya
  - Tonga people of Zambia and Zimbabwe
  - Tumbuka

=== Religion ===
Religion in Zambia

- Christianity in Zambia
- Hinduism in Zambia
- Islam in Zambia
- Hinduism in Zambia
- Islam in Zambia
- Lumpa Church
- Roman Catholicism in Zambia
  - Roman Catholic Archdiocese of Kasama
  - Roman Catholic Archdiocese of Lusaka
  - Roman Catholic Diocese of Mansa
  - Roman Catholic Diocese of Mpika
- White Fathers

=== Sport in Zambia ===
Sport in Zambia

- 2011 All-Africa Games
- Zambia at the 2006 Commonwealth Games

==== Football in Zambia ====
- Football Association of Zambia
- Zambia national football team

===== Football competitions =====
- Zambian Challenge Cup
- Zambian Coca-Cola Cup
- Zambian Cup
- Zambian Premier League

===== Football venues =====
- Dag Hammerskjold Stadium
- Dola Hill Stadium
- Edwin Imboela Stadium
- Garden Park
- Independence Stadium (Zambia)
- Konkola Stadium
- Nchanga Stadium
- New Livingstone Stadium
- Heroes Stadium
- Levy Mwanawasa Stadium
- Railways Stadium
- Sunset Stadium

===== Football clubs =====
- Forest Rangers Football Club
- Green Buffaloes FC
- Kabwe Warriors Football Club
- Kitwe United Football Club
- Konkola Blades Football Club
- Lusaka Dynamos
- Mufulira Wanderers
- National Assembly Football Club
- Nchanga Rangers
- Nkana Red Devils
- Nkwazi Football Club
- Power Dynamos FC
- ZESCO United Football Club
- Zanaco FC
- Roan United

==== Other sports ====
- Commonwealth XI cricket team in Rhodesia in 1962-63
- International XI cricket team in Rhodesia in 1961-62
- Zambia Davis Cup team
- Zambia national basketball team
- Zambia National Commercial Bank
- Zambia national cricket team
- Zambia national rugby union team
- Zambia women's national rugby union team

===== Zambia at the Olympics =====
- Northern Rhodesia at the 1964 Summer Olympics
- Zambia at the 1968 Summer Olympics
- Zambia at the 1972 Summer Olympics
- Zambia at the 1980 Summer Olympics
- Zambia at the 1984 Summer Olympics
- Zambia at the 1988 Summer Olympics
- Zambia at the 1992 Summer Olympics
- Zambia at the 1996 Summer Olympics
- Zambia at the 2000 Summer Olympics
- Zambia at the 2004 Summer Olympics

== Economy and infrastructure of Zambia ==
Economy of Zambia

- Economic rank, by nominal GDP (2007): 111th (one hundred and eleventh)
- Banking in Zambia
  - National Bank of Zambia
- Communications in Zambia
  - Internet in Zambia
    - .zm
- Companies of Zambia
  - Chilanga Cement
  - First Quantum Minerals of Canada
  - Glencore International
  - Illovo Sugar
  - Konkola Copper Mines
  - Zambeef Products
  - Zambia Consolidated Copper Mines
  - Zambia Post
  - Zambian Airways
  - Zamtel
- Currency of Zambia: Kwacha
  - ISO 4217: ZMK
- Energy in Zambia
  - Power Stations in Zambia
  - Oil industry in Zambia
    - Tazama Pipeline
- Health care in Zambia
- Mining in Zambia
  - Copperbelt
- Stock exchange: Lusaka Stock Exchange
- Tourism in Zambia
  - See also Geography and Environment sections above
  - Chimfunshi Wildlife Orphanage
  - Livingstone Memorial
  - Monuments and Historic Sites of Zambia
  - Von Lettow-Vorbeck Memorial
- Trade unions
  - Federation of Free Trade Unions of Zambia
  - Zambia Congress of Trade Unions
- Transport in Zambia
  - Air transport
    - Airlines in Zambia
      - Zambian Airways
      - Defunct airlines
        - Aero Zambia
        - Airwaves Airlink
        - Eastern Air
        - Nationwide Airlines (Zambia)
        - Zambia Airways
    - Airports in Zambia
      - List of airports in Zambia
      - Chipata Airport
      - Livingstone Airport
      - Lusaka International Airport
      - Mfuwe Airport
      - Ndola Airport
      - Ngoma Airport
      - Solwezi Airport
  - Rail transport in Zambia
    - Benguela railway
    - Mpika railway station
    - Mulobezi Railway
    - TAZARA Railway
    - Zambia Railways
  - Roads in Zambia
    - Cape to Cairo Road
    - Cairo Road
    - Congo Pedicle road
    - Trans–Caprivi Highway
    - Great East Road (Zambia)
    - Great North Road (Zambia)
    - Bridges in Zambia
      - Chirundu Bridge
      - Kafue Railway Bridge
      - Katima Mulilo Bridge
      - Luangwa Bridge
      - Victoria Falls Bridge
  - Water Transport in Zambia
    - Dugout (boat)
    - Ferries
      - Kabompo Ferry
      - Kazungula Ferry
      - MV Liemba
- Water supply and sanitation in Zambia
  - Dams
    - Itezhi-Tezhi Dam
    - Kariba Dam
    - Mulungushi Dam
    - Mita Hills Dam

== Education in Zambia ==
Education in Zambia

- List of schools in Zambia
  - Sakeji School
- Primary schools
  - Musikili Primary School
- Secondary schools
  - Banani International Secondary School
  - Chengelo Secondary School
  - Chizongwe Secondary School
  - Munali Secondary School
- Colleges
  - Baobab College

== Lists of Zambia-related topics ==
- List of airports in Zambia
- List of birds of Zambia
- Cities – see List of settlements in Zambia
- List of Zambian companies
- Historical figures – see List of Zambians
- List of mammals in Zambia
- List of national parks of Zambia
- People – see List of Zambians
- List of political parties in Zambia
- Politicians – see List of Zambians
- List of presidents of Zambia
- List of schools in Zambia
- List of settlements in Zambia
- Athletes – see List of Zambians
- Towns – see List of settlements in Zambia
- List of vice presidents of Zambia
- List of Zambian parliamentary constituencies
- List of Zambians
- List of Zambia-related topics

== See also ==
- Bibliography of the history of Zambia
