= Mulungushi =

River in central Zambia

Coordinates: 14°40′S 28°50′E

Mulungushi is a river (and a small town nearby) in central Zambia which has taken on a symbolic and historical meaning synonymous with the independence and identity of the nation. The name has been given to a number of events, localities, buildings and organisations, including:

- Mulungushi Rock of Authority, an outdoor venue for political conventions and meetings;
- The Mulungushi Declaration, a policy statement made by President Kenneth Kaunda in 1968 on the nationalisation of the means of production;
- Mulungushi Village, a suburb of Lusaka;
- Mulungushi Hall, an international conference and convention centre, used also as an official reception centre by the Zambian government, and the site of several conferences and negotiations of the independence and anti-apartheid movements in southern Africa;
- Mulungushi House, an office building in Lusaka, home to Zambian Ministry of Agriculture;
- Mulungushi University;
- A number of businesses, such as Zambia-China Mulungushi Textiles Ltd;
- Several roads.

== Other uses and links ==
- Mulungushi River, the origin of the name
- Mulungushi Dam, a dam on that river
- Mulungushi Falls, a waterfall on the river
- The Mulungushi River area was also the site of a training camp for Zimbabwe People's Revolutionary Army fighters in the 1970s sometimes referred to as the 'Mulungushi camp' but this was not an official name and it was not related to the Zambian use of the name.
