= Eagle Award =

Eagle Award may refer to:

- Eagle Award (comics), an annual set of comic book awards
- The highest rank of the Zambia Scouts Association

== See also ==
- Eagle Scout (disambiguation)
- Golden Eagle Award (disambiguation)
