= Scouting and Guiding in Zambia =

Scouting and Guiding associations in Zambia

The Scout and Guide movement in Zambia is served by:

- Girl Guides Association of Zambia, member of the World Association of Girl Guides and Girl Scouts
- Zambia Scouts Association, member of the World Organization of the Scout Movement.

== International Scouting units in Zambia ==
In addition, there are American Boy Scouts in Lusaka, linked to the Direct Service branch of the Boy Scouts of America, which supports units around the world.

== See also ==
- Scouting in displaced persons camps
