= List of rivers of Zambia =

This is a list of rivers in Zambia. This list is arranged by drainage basin, with respective tributaries indented under each larger stream's name.

== Atlantic Ocean ==
- Lake Tanganyika
  - Lufubu River
    - Kalambo River
  - Luvua River (Democratic Republic of the Congo)
    - Kalungwishi River
      - Luangwa River
    - Luapula River
      - Mbereshi River
      - Luongo River
      - Lwela River
      - Luombwa River
      - Chambeshi River
        - Lukulu River
          - Lwombe River

== Indian Ocean ==
- Zambezi River
  - Luia River (Mozambique)
    - Capoche River
  - Luangwa River
    - Lunsemfwa River
      - Lukasashi River
      - Mulungushi River
    - Lupande River
    - Lundazi River
  - Chongwe River
  - Kafue River
    - Lufupa River
    - Lunga River
    - Luswishi River
  - Kalomo River
  - Machili River
  - Cuando River
  - Njoko River
  - Lumbe River
  - Lui River
  - Luete River
  - Luanginga River
  - Luena River
  - Lungwebungu River
  - Kabompo River
    - Dongwe River
      - Lalafuta River
      - Musondweji River
    - Maninga River
    - West Lunga River
    - Mwafwe River
  - Sakeji River

== Lake Rukwa ==
- Momba River (Tanzania)
  - Saisi River
    - Lumi River

== See also ==
- Water transport in Zambia
