= Prostitution in Zambia =

Prostitution in Zambia is legal and common. Related activities such as soliciting and procuring are prohibited. UNAIDS estimate there are 9,285 prostitutes in the capital, Lusaka. Many women turn to prostitution due to poverty. Sex workers report law enforcement is corrupt, inconsistent and often abusive.

In Lusaka, some prostitutes enrol in colleges to obtain a campus room to work from.

Zambia has a huge problem relating to child prostitution. There is a common false belief that having intercourse with a virgin will cure AIDS. HIV and sex trafficking are also problems in the country.

== History ==
Prior to the arrival of the Europeans, prostitution occurred along the long-distance trade routes, especially around the rest houses.

From 1850, the number of Europeans settling in Zambia increased greatly. Most were single men who employed 'Cook Boys’ as servants. Part of the duties of the 'Cook Boys’ was to procure prostitutes for their employers. The woman became known as 'Cook Women’.

Starting from in the 1900s, many men moved from the rural areas to the emerging industrial areas to find work. Some worked in the tin and lead mines at Kabwe, others worked on the construction of the Livingstone to Katanga railway. These men. living away from their wives, created a demand for prostitution in these areas. In Lusaka, prostitutes set up settlements alongside the worker's residential areas.

In the 1920s and 1930s, large scale mining in the Copperbelt was established. The mine workers created a huge demand for prostitution. The prostitutes also cooked and washed for the miners and were known as 'comfort women'.

By 1930, STIs were highly prevalent amongst migrant workers. The Native Authorities expelled all unmarried women from migrant worker's camps in the Copperbelt. The Colonial Government set up blockades at bus stops and transit routes in 1939 in an attempt to stop the prostitutes travelling to the areas men were working in. As a result, brothels started to appear along the migrant labour routes, these routes becoming known as 'whores’ tracks'. Thee Mulobezi – Mongu trail in the Western Province was particularly known for its brothels.

Following Zambia's win over Ghana in the 2012 Africa Cup of Nations's semi-final, many prostitutes offered supporters free sex as part of the celebrations.

== HIV ==
HIV is a major problem in Zambia, with the 7th highest prevalence in the world. Sex workers are a high risk group. Condom use is low, partly due to a belief that circumcised men can't spread the infection. UNAIDS estimate HIV prevalence amongst sex workers to be 56.4%

== Sex trafficking ==
Zambia is a source, transit, and destination country for women and children subjected to sex trafficking. While orphans and street children are most vulnerable, children of affluent village families are also at risk of trafficking because sending children to the city for work is perceived to confer status. Zambian boys and girls are exploited in sex trafficking by truck drivers in towns along the Zimbabwean and Tanzanian borders and by miners in Solwezi. Zambian boys are subjected to sex trafficking in Zimbabwe and women and girls are subjected to sex trafficking in South Africa. Domestically, extended families and trusted family acquaintances facilitate trafficking.

Women and children from neighboring countries are exploited in sex trafficking in Zambia. Chinese traffickers bring in Chinese women and girls for sexual exploitation in brothels and massage parlors in Lusaka; traffickers use front companies posing as travel agencies to lure Chinese victims and coordinate with Zambian facilitators and middlemen. Potential trafficking victims from Ethiopia, Democratic Republic of the Congo, and Syria were identified in Zambia.

The United States Department of State Office to Monitor and Combat Trafficking in Persons ranks Zambia as a 'Tier 2' country.
