= Mulungushi Dam =

Dam in Zambia

Coordinates: 14°40′S 28°50′E

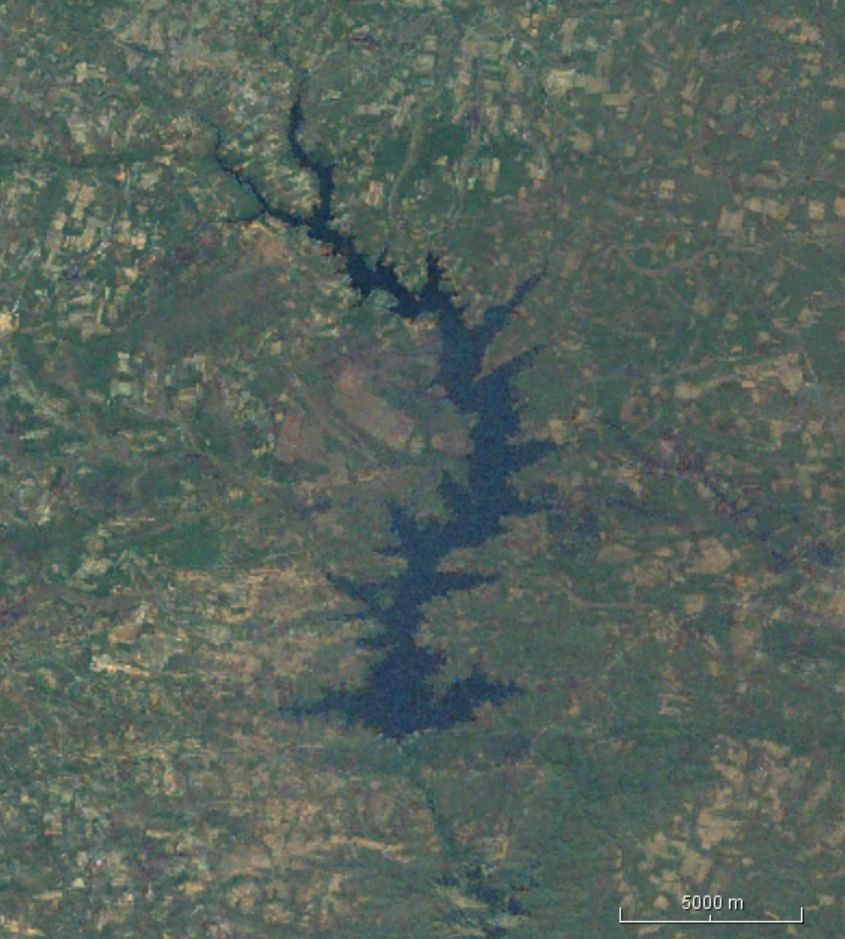
Satellit photo of the reservoir

The Mulungushi Dam located 50 kilometres (31 mi) southeast of Kabwe, Zambia, was constructed by the Broken Hill Development Company on the Mulungushi River and opened in 1925 by the Prince of Wales (the future Edward VIII) to provide hydroelectric power to the Broken Hill Mine in Kabwe (known as Broken Hill at that time). It is a sister facility to the Mita Hills Dam 60 km (37 mi) to its northeast. The Lunsemfwa Hydropower Company currently controls the power stations of both dams and the one at Lunsemfwa Falls.

The manmade lake created by the Mulungushi Dam is approximately 20 km (12 mi) long and 2–3 km (1.2–1.9 mi) wide and is home to the Mulungushi Boat Club (MBC) and a local fishing competition.
