= Chibombo bus crash =

2013 disaster in Zambia

Coordinates: 14.658°S 28.073°E

- Location of Central Province in Zambia

Details
- Date: 7 February 2013
- Location: Central Province
- Country: Zambia

Statistics
- Deaths: 51
- Injured: 28

Chibombo in Zambia

On 7 February 2013, a bus collided with a semi-truck and a sport utility vehicle on the Great North Road, between the towns of Chibombo and Kabwe in the Central Province of Zambia, resulting in the deaths of 49 of the 73 persons on the bus, and of the truck driver and his assistant. A further 28 people were injured.

The crash was one of the worst in the history of Zambia, and was compared to a 2005 bus accident in which 38 high school students died and another 50 were seriously injured.

== Details ==
The 74-seat bus, operated by Zambia Postal Services, left Ndola, in the Copperbelt Province at 04:30 CAT, and was heading toward Zambia's capital, Lusaka. The road connecting Lusaka to Tanzania is a two-lane highway known for having heavy traffic. District Commissioner Priscilla Chisha reported that a sport utility vehicle attempting to pass the bus crashed head-on into an oncoming truck, sending it into the bus' path, while a survivor of the accident stated that the bus swerved into the truck to avoid an oncoming vehicle. Police spokeswoman Elizabeth Kanjela said that even hours after the crash it was not possible to enter the bus wreckage to determine if there were other trapped passengers.

=== Criminal investigation ===
An official of the office of the vice-president told press that all the vehicles involved were speeding. The driver of the SUV, a farm manager from South Africa, was arrested and charged with "51 counts of causing death by dangerous driving", according to Kanjela.

== Reaction ==
President Michael Sata offered his condolences to the families of the victims; "We pray that the Lord almighty grants the bereaved families comfort and strength during this very painful period." Chief Government spokesperson Kennedy Sakeni also offered condolences on behalf of the government, and pledged work would be done to minimise future tragedies. On 8 February, the government declared three days of national mourning.

South African President Jacob Zuma offered his condolences to the people of Zambia in a statement stating "Our hearts go out to the families, relatives and friends of the deceased. Our thoughts are with the injured as we wish them a speedy recovery."
