= Ellensmere High School =

Private boarding school

Ellensmere High School earlier known as "Yonda fields", is a privately owned secondary boarding school in a rural Zambian province (Muchonchi, Kabwe). The school is owned by an affluent family whose family immigrated to Zambia during and after the colonial years (1964 and beyond).
