= Michael Norgrove =

Zambian boxer

Personal information
- Nationality: British
- Born: 9 January 1981 Kabwe, Zambia
- Died: 6 April 2013 (aged 32) London, England
- Weight: light-middleweight

Boxing career

Boxing record
- Total fights: 6
- Wins: 5
- Losses: 0
- Draws: 0
- No contests: 1

Michael Norgrove (9 January 1981 – 6 April 2013) was a British professional boxer from Woodford Green, London. Nicknamed the "Zambezi Hitman", at the time of his death Norgrove had an unbeaten professional record. His death occurred several days after he was taken ill during a boxing match in London, and marked the United Kingdom's first post-match boxing fatality of the 21st century. Norgrove's death reopened the debate as to the safety of boxing as a sport.

== Life and career ==
Born in Kabwe, Norgrove was the son of a British expatriate who worked for Zambian Railways. The family left Zambia at the end of his father's contract when Norgrove was seven, and moved first to Australia, then later to Manchester in England.

In boxing Norgrove competed at light-middleweight level, and entered the sport at a relatively late age. He was known as the "Zambesi Hitman". As an amateur he participated in white-collar fights before boxing at London's Repton Club in the East End. There he took part in the Amateur Boxing Association's Novice Championship, winning the London title, and competing nationally in 2009. He turned professional in 2010. He was also a contemporary and former sparring partner of the one time European super-middleweight champion James DeGale.

Having successfully fought five bouts, he was taking part in his sixth fight (against Tom Bowen) when he was taken ill. It was his first professional fight following a two-year break. On 28 March 2013 he was competing at the historic Ring venue in Blackfriars, which was hosting its first professional boxing event for 73 years. During the fifth round of a six-round fight, referee Jeff Hinds noticed Norgrove acting strangely and stopped the bout. Norgrove subsequently collapsed, and was treated at the scene before being taken to the Royal London Hospital, where he underwent emergency brain surgery for a cerebral haemorrhage. He died nine days later on 6 April following complications. It was the first post-match death in British boxing to occur in the 21st Century, the last being Scottish bantamweight James Murray who died in 1995 from head injuries sustained during a fight in Glasgow.

The result of Norgrove's final fight was recorded as "no contest", meaning he had an unbeaten record at the time of his death.

== Reaction to death ==
Public interest in boxing had experienced an upsurge since the 2012 Summer Olympics when Britain won five medals in the sport, and the UK Government's funding body, UK Sport had increased the amount of finance allocated to it, but Norgrove's death reopened the debate over its safety. Peter McCabe, chief executive of Headway, a charity that supports people with brain injuries, called for it to be banned. "Every time a boxer gets into the ring, there is a significant risk that they may lose their life or sustain a devastating, life-changing brain injury [...] Until this sport is banned, more young lives will be tragically lost." However, Robert Smith, general secretary of the British Boxing Board of Control defended the sport's safety procedures. "We are one of the strictest authorities in the world. This is an acute injury, this can happen any time. He had his medicals done, he had his brain scans done. There was nothing there of any concern whatsoever, else he wouldn't have been in the ring."

Monica Harris, herself a boxer, and a close friend of Norgrove's announced her intention to quit the sport amid concerns for her own safety. "I just don't feel it's right to carry on after this. It [safety] wasn't something I really worried about before. It wasn't an issue. This has just made it real, what we do when we get in the ring. I have a fight on Friday [12 April] which I've been training for since the beginning of the year, and I'm going to make this my last." Errol Johnson, who trained Tom Bowen, Norgrove's opponent in his final fights, said the boxer had been left devastated by the incident and was considering whether to continue in the sport.

Writing for The Independent, the sports journalist Steve Bunce expressed incomprehension at the death, but felt it was a tragic accident. "In nearly 30 years I have never been as confused by a boxer's death or injury as I am by Norgrove's [...] Norgrove did nothing wrong, the sport did nothing wrong and there is nothing that could have been done to prevent this death. There is no hidden story attached to this tragedy."
