= Chongwe River =

Major river in Zambia

Coordinates: 15°42′57″S 29°20′22″E

The Chongwe River in red.

The Chongwe River is a river in Zambia. The river begins to the north east of the capital Lusaka, and alongside the larger Kafue River, drains into the Zambezi River. It forms the western boundary of the Lower Zambezi National Park.

== See also ==
- List of rivers of Zambia
