= Mulungushi University =

Public university in Zambia

Coordinates: 14.4485°S 28.4456°E

- Former names: National College of Management and Development Studies
- Motto: Pursuing the frontiers of knowledge
- Type: Public
- Established: 2008; 18 years ago
- Chancellor: Professor Oliver Saasa
- Vice-Chancellor: Ambassador Professor Royson M. Mukwena, Ph.D.,
- Academic staff: 800
- Students: 14000
- Undergraduates: 10000+
- Postgraduates: 2000+
- Location: Kabwe, Central Province, 10101, Zambia
- Campus: Great North Road (Main), Town (Kabwe), Livingstone
- Colours: White, Blue and Melon
- Nickname: MU
- Website: Official website

Mulungushi University is one of the public universities of Zambia. Previously known as the National College of Management and Development Studies, it was turned into a university by the Zambian Government in a public-private partnership with Konkola Copper Mines in 2008. The university consists of three campuses: the Main Campus, or Great North Road Campus, located 26 kilometers North of Kabwe on the banks of the Mulungushi River; the Town Campus, located along Mubanga Road, off Munkoyo Street, near the center of Kabwe town; and the Livingstone Campus, located within the Livingstone Hospital, which is home to the medical school. The university provides bachelor's degrees and master's degrees for full-time and distance education. In 2009, more than 500 distance education students enrolled. They were mainly former diploma students of the National College for Management and Development Studies.

The Main (Great North Road) Campus is located near the Mulungushi Rock of Authority, a kopje often called the Birthplace of Zambian Independence, where Kenneth Kaunda and the Zambian African National Congress secretly met for rallies. Today, a more accessible rock is still used for political conventions and meetings as well as graduation ceremonies of the university. A series of chalets were built to house dignitaries and other guests.

== Schools ==
Mulungushi University has eightschools and offers degrees in 118 programs.

- School of Agriculture and Natural Resources
  - Department of Agricultural Economics and Agribusiness
  - Department of Natural Resources and Environmental Sciences
  - Department of Agricultural Biotechnology and Bio-sciences
- School of Social Science
  - Department of Social Development Studies
  - Department of Economics
- School of Business Studies
  - Department of Business Studies
  - Department of Law, Labour & Human Resource Management
- School of Engineering and Technology
  - Department of Computer Science and Information Technology
  - Department of Engineering
- School of Natural and Applied Science
  - Department of Mathematics and Statistics
  - Department of Physics
  - Department of Chemistry and Biology
- School of Education
- School of Medicine and Health Sciences
  - Department of Basic Sciences
  - Department of Pharmacology
  - Department of Anatomy

In addition to the Schools and Departments, Mulungushi University has various other educational and administrative units. One important unit is the Library, which is an information and learning focal point for management, lecturers, students, and researchers. The university has two libraries, namely the Main Campus Library and the Kabwe Town Campus Library. The libraries run similar services. The library at the Main (Great North Road) Campus, named the Friedrich Ebert Memorial Library, was designated a United Nations (UN) Repository Library in September 1978 when the institution was a college. The Library has also been a World Bank Repository since February 2007, as well as a Friedrich Ebert Foundation Repository. Other items in the collection include newspaper collections of the Times of Zambia, Zambia Daily Mail, and the Post News paper.

The two libraries are accessible to students and staff of the Institution. ICTs The Library has a number of student computers running on a Local Area Network (LAN) with an Internet connection. The Libraries are headed by a University Librarian.

Images of Mulungushi University
Information and Communication Technology (ICT) Building

Library, Main (Great North Road) Campus

Multipurpose Building, used for classroom and sport

Administration Building, located at the Main (Great North Road) Campus

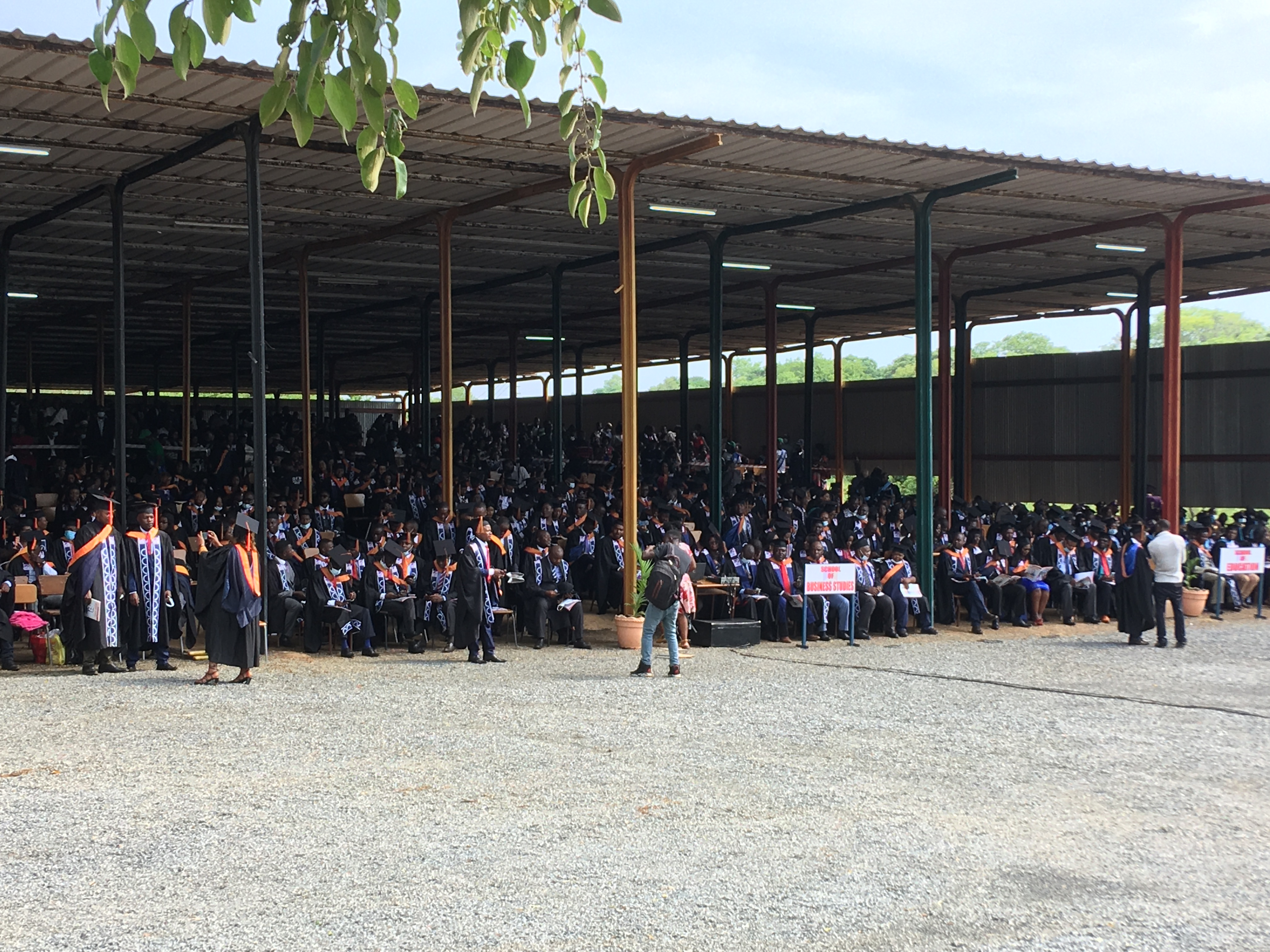
Graduation ceremony, at the Mulungushi Rock of Authority, November 2021

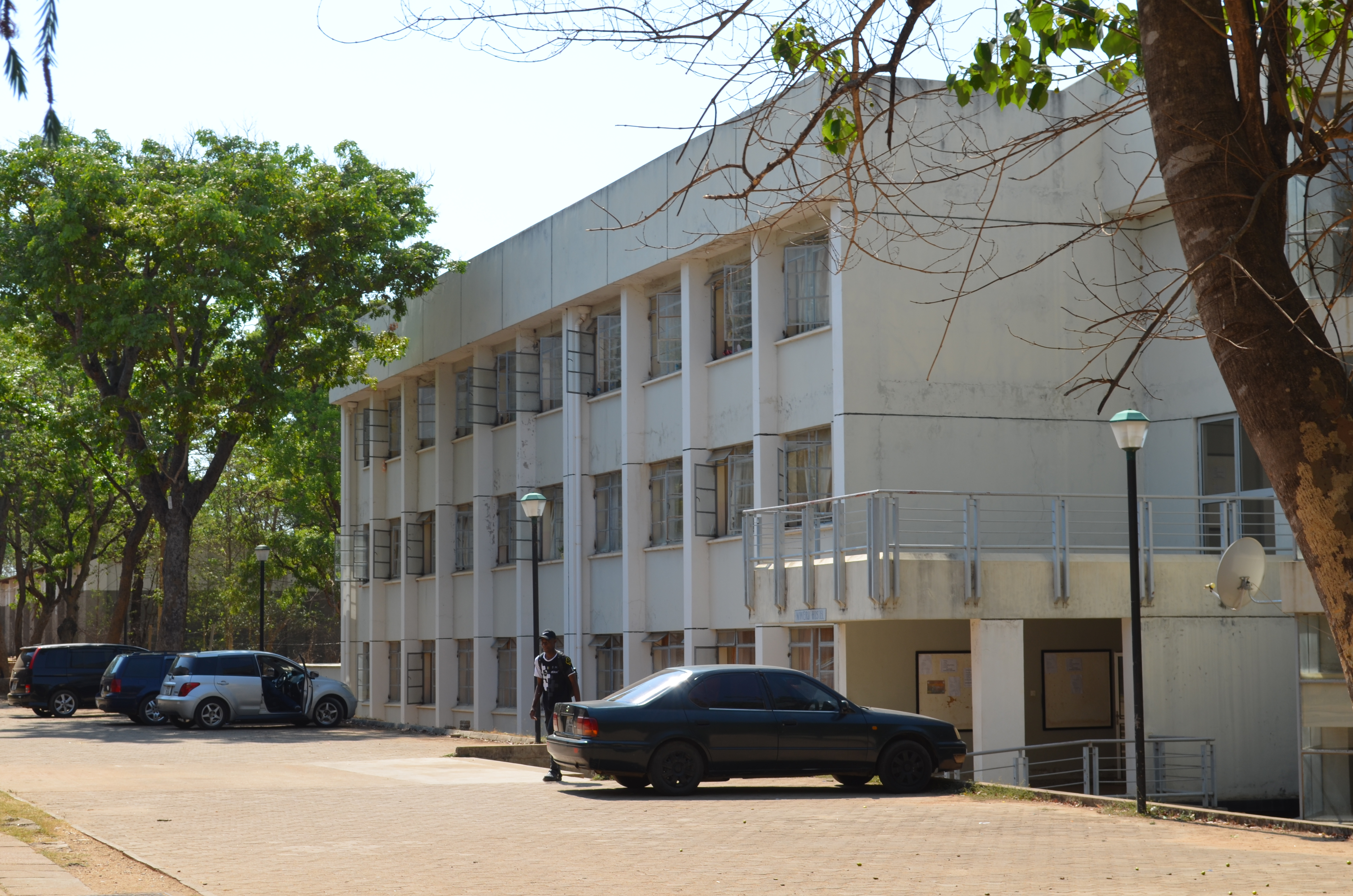
One of the modern hostels (dormitories) on the Main Campus

Laboratory facilities for biology, chemistry, and physics

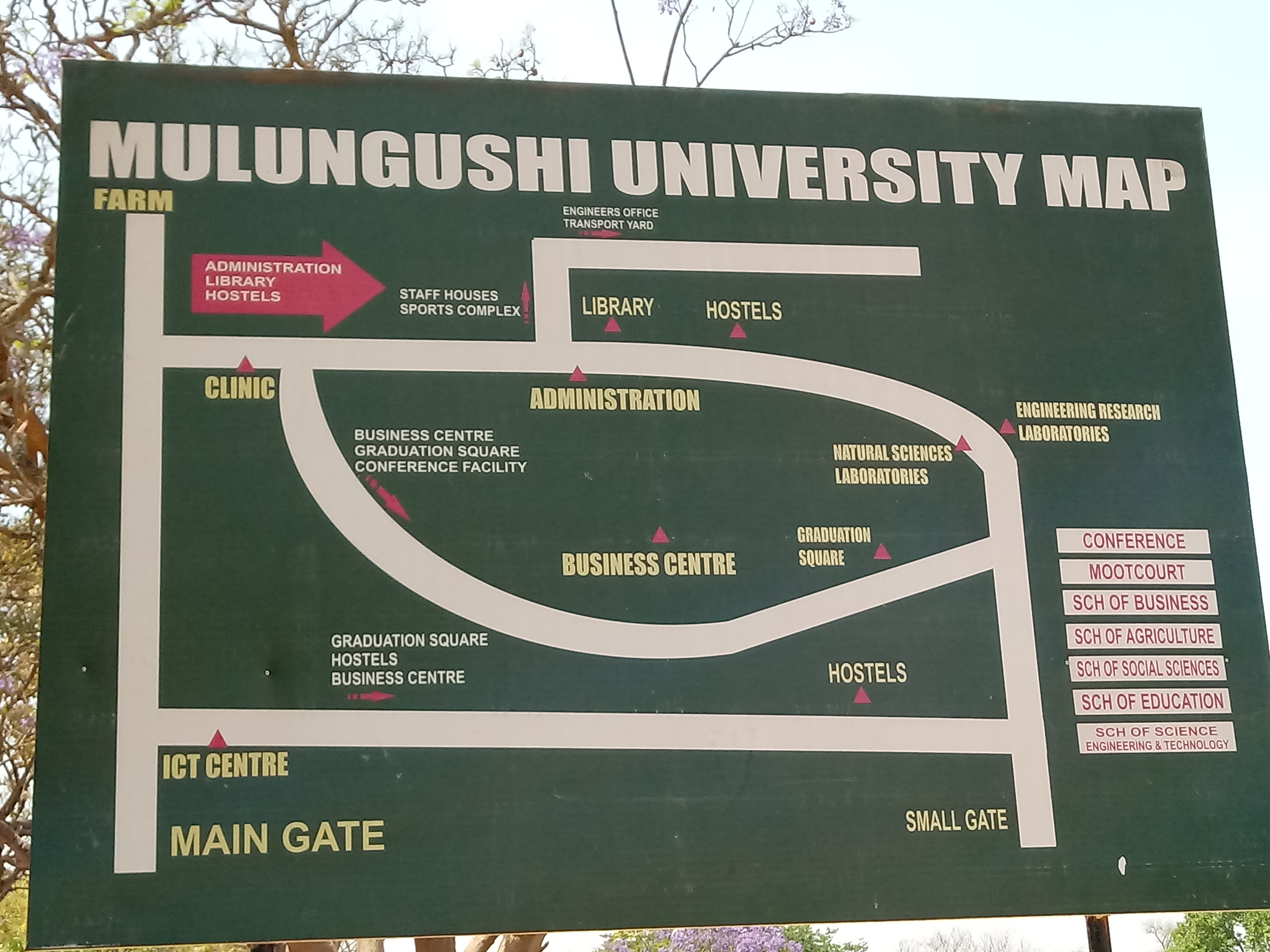
Map of the Main (Great North Road) Campus

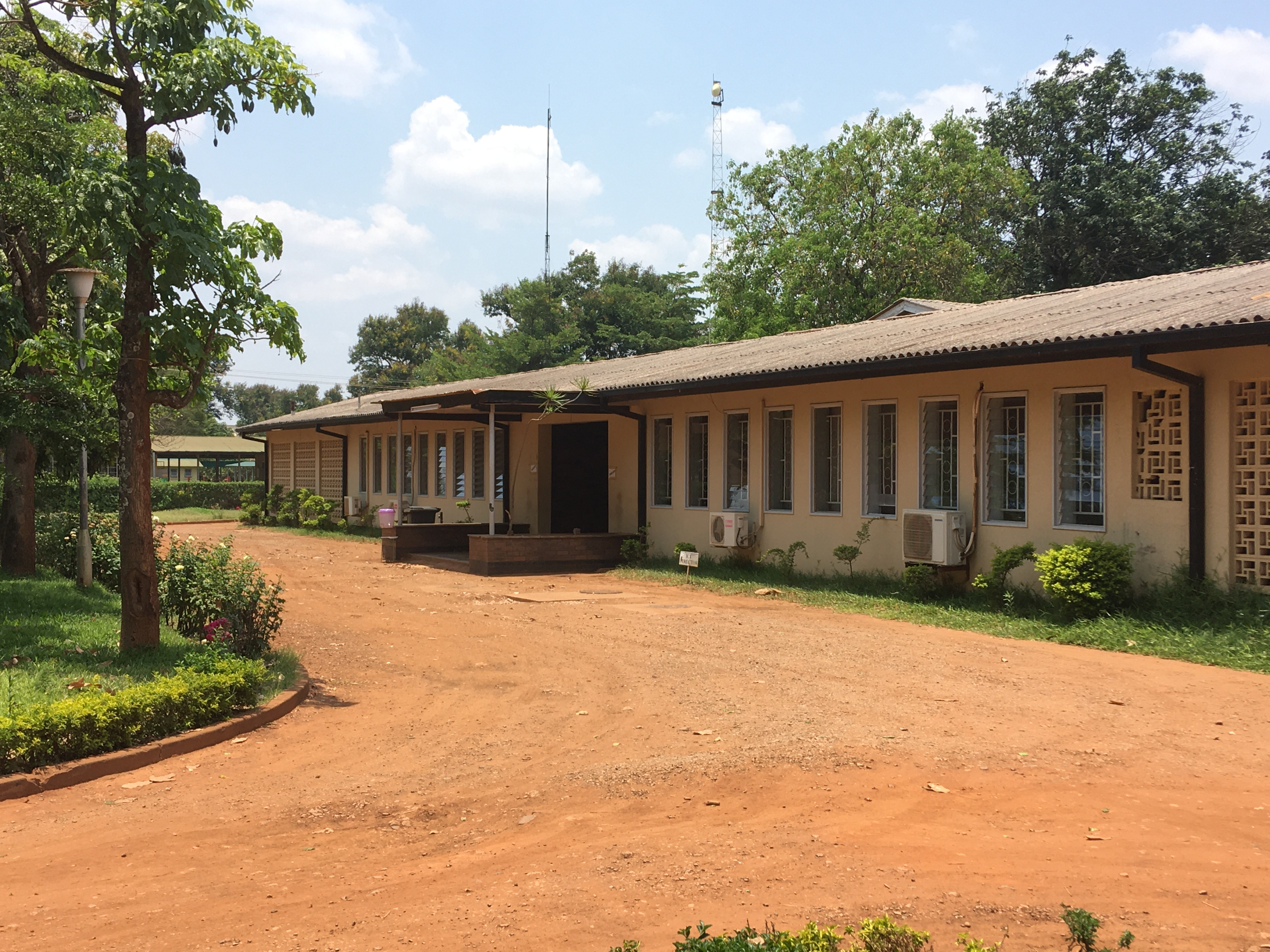
Classroom building at the Kabwe Town Campus

== See also ==
- Education in Zambia
- List of universities in Zambia
