= Eagle Scout (disambiguation) =

Eagle Scout is the highest rank in the Scouts BSA program of the Boy Scouts of America.

- List of Eagle Scouts

Eagle Scout may refer to similar ranks in other Scout organizations:

- Eagle Scout (Boy Scouts of the Philippines)
- Pramuka Garuda (Eagle Scout), the highest rank of Gerakan Pramuka, the Indonesian Scout Association
- Eagle Award, the highest rank of the Zambia Scouts Association
- Assyrian Eagle Scouts of Australia association
