= Tonga baskets =

Tonga baskets or Binga baskets are baskets woven by the Tonga women of the Southern Province of Zambia, who are renowned for their basket weaving. The baskets have a distinctive design with a square bottom forming the foundation of the basket.

It takes approximately two weeks to complete a basket about 35 cm in diameter. The baskets are made from the ilala or malala palm (mapokwe in Tonga), which, although growing freely, is also planted by Tonga women for the purpose of basket making. This re-planting became standard practice in the late 1980s with the opening of the Tonga Craft Centre in Binga village, Zimbabwe a centre funded by the Danish government, which exported thousands of baskets a year. This craft centre was meant to keep the traditional crafts alive: basket-making, drum making, carving, pottery, and beading. The Tonga live in an area prone to drought and poverty, and the basket making helped the women feed their families.

Traditionally, the baskets are used for carrying maize or sorghum from the fields and then winnowing the grain. Traditional designs includes stripes, a spider web type pattern and a lightning pattern. Some Tonga, typically women, partake in basket weaving as a source of income.
