= Islam in Zambia =

Zambia is officially a Christian country, with adherents of Islam forming 2.7% of the population in the country. However, Zambia's constitution guarantees the freedom of religion and conscience, and Muslims are free to proselytize and build places of worship in the country.

== History ==
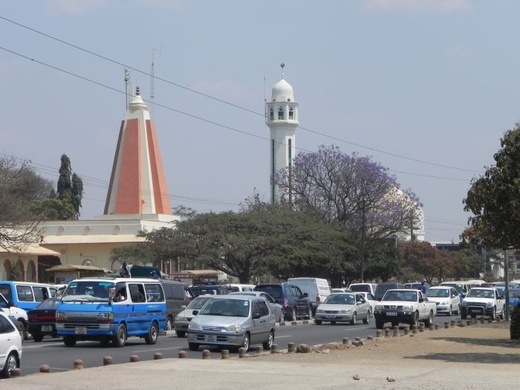
A mosque in Lusaka

The presence of Islam in Zambia dates after the 12th century onward when Muslims established emirates on the coast of East Africa. In the 18th century, Muslim ivory and slave merchants extended their business to the hinterland regions reaching Zambia in the period of the Omani dynasty Al Bu Said. Muslim traders entered Zambia from their trading bases on the coast of Tanzania, Malawi and Mozambique.

The earliest permanent community of Muslims in Zambia emerged in the early 20th century when Yao merchants settled in Lusaka.

Many Muslims entered Zambia during the colonial period, primarily came from the Indian subcontinent establishing themselves along the railways in the central part of the country from Livingstone to Lusaka. In the 1970s, Zambian Muslims began registering associations for organizing the activities and resources of the community. Multiple associations exist that represent different ethnic groups and branches of Islamic practices.

== Demographics ==
In 2023, there were 100,000 Muslims in Zambia, representing 2.7% of the total population. Although Zambia is officially a "Christian Nation" there is freedom of religion and Muslims generally are accepted in the society. The vast majority of Muslims in Zambia are Sunni. A small Ismaili Shia community is also present. There are about 500 people belonging to the Ahmadiyya sect in Islam.

Most Zambian Muslims are of Indian descent though there is a significant native convert community. Immigrants from West Africa and the Middle East comprise the rest of the Muslim population.
