= Mulungushi River =

River in Zambia

Coordinates: 14.8842°S 29.1933°E

The Luangwa River basin with the Mulungushi River (bottom left)

The Mulungushi River in central Zambia is a tributary of the Lunsemfwa River and a part of the Zambezi River basin. It rises on the plateau north-west of Kabwe and flows south-east into the Luangwa Rift Valley where it joins the Lunsemfwa.

The river is the site of the Mulungushi Dam, and its name has become a symbol of Zambia's independence through the Mulungushi Rock of Authority.

== See also ==
- List of rivers of Zambia
