= Mulungushi Rock of Authority =

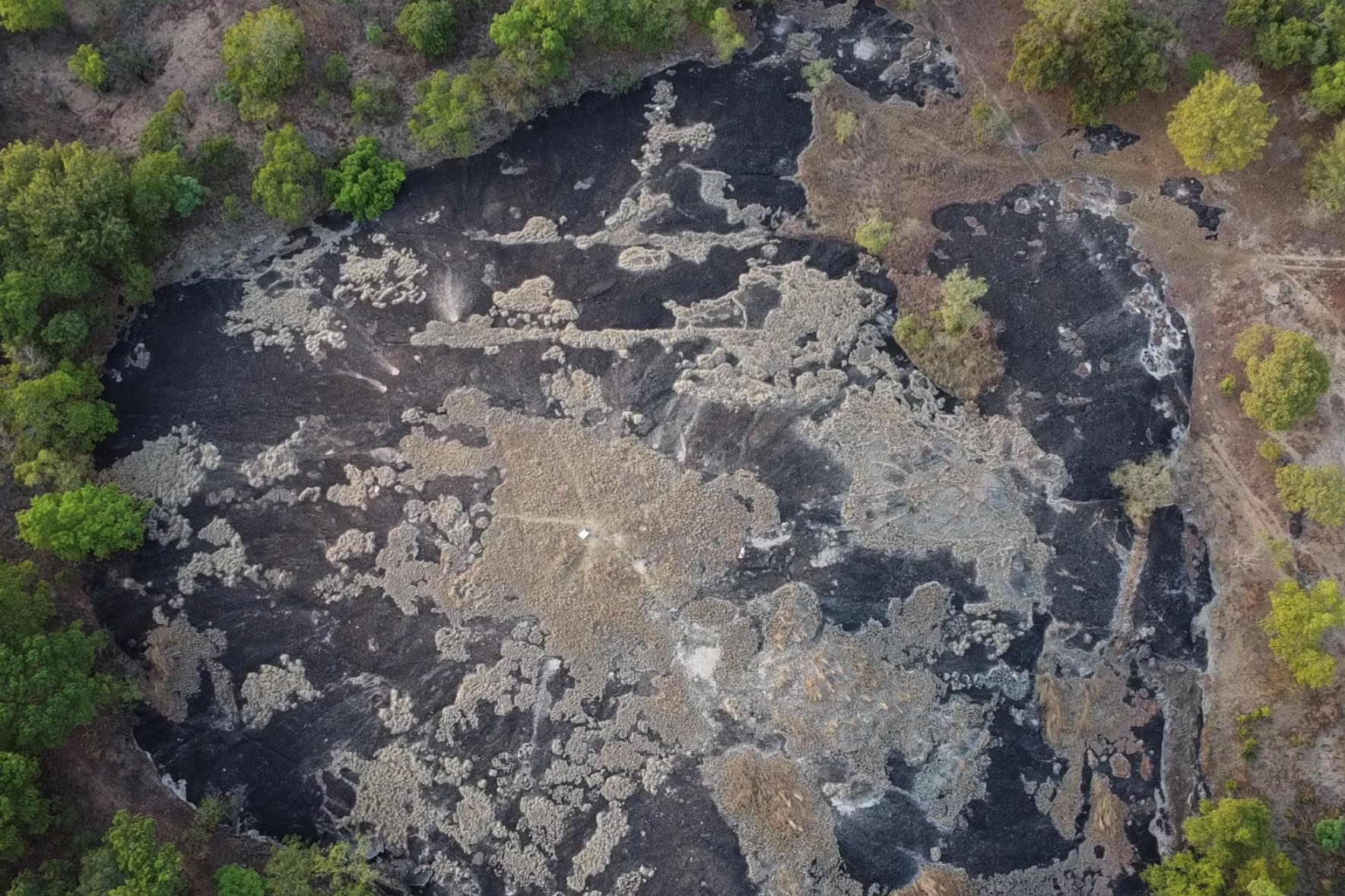

Highest point
- Coordinates: 14°17′53.46″S 28°34′52.66″E

Geography
- Location: Central Province, Zambia

Mulungushi Rock of Authority, also known as Mulungushi Rock, is a kopje (isolated rock hill) in the Central Province of Zambia associated with major political gatherings and speeches. Situated near the Mulungushi River north of Kabwe, it was first used in 1958 for a rally of the Zambian African National Congress and then in 1960 for the first conference of the newly-formed United National Independence Party. Since 1964, it has been regularly used by political parties for their annual conventions and meetings. A national symbol, the Rock of Authority is called "the birthplace of Zambian independence".

== History ==
Mulungushi Rock was first used for an October 26, 1958 rally of the Zambian African National Congress (ZANC) under the leadership of Kenneth Kaunda. When Kaunda and other nationalists broke away from the ZANC and launched their own political party, the United National Independence Party (UNIP), in 1960, they chose the isolated site to hold their first party conference where it would not draw the attention of the North Rhodesian authorities. The area was centrally located, however, enabling more participants to come from all parts of the country. Situated near the Mulungushi River approximately 10 kilometres (6.2 mi) north of Broken Hill (later renamed Kabwe), the Rock could accommodate up to 2,000 people for outdoor speeches and for lodging in temporary shelters. The river guaranteed a water source for large crowds, as did a small dambo flowing from the north. The conference organizers received a permit to use the land but were not allowed to cut down trees or gather wood for fires; they were required to purchase wood from the Mpima Forestry Offices 50 kilometres (31 mi) distant.

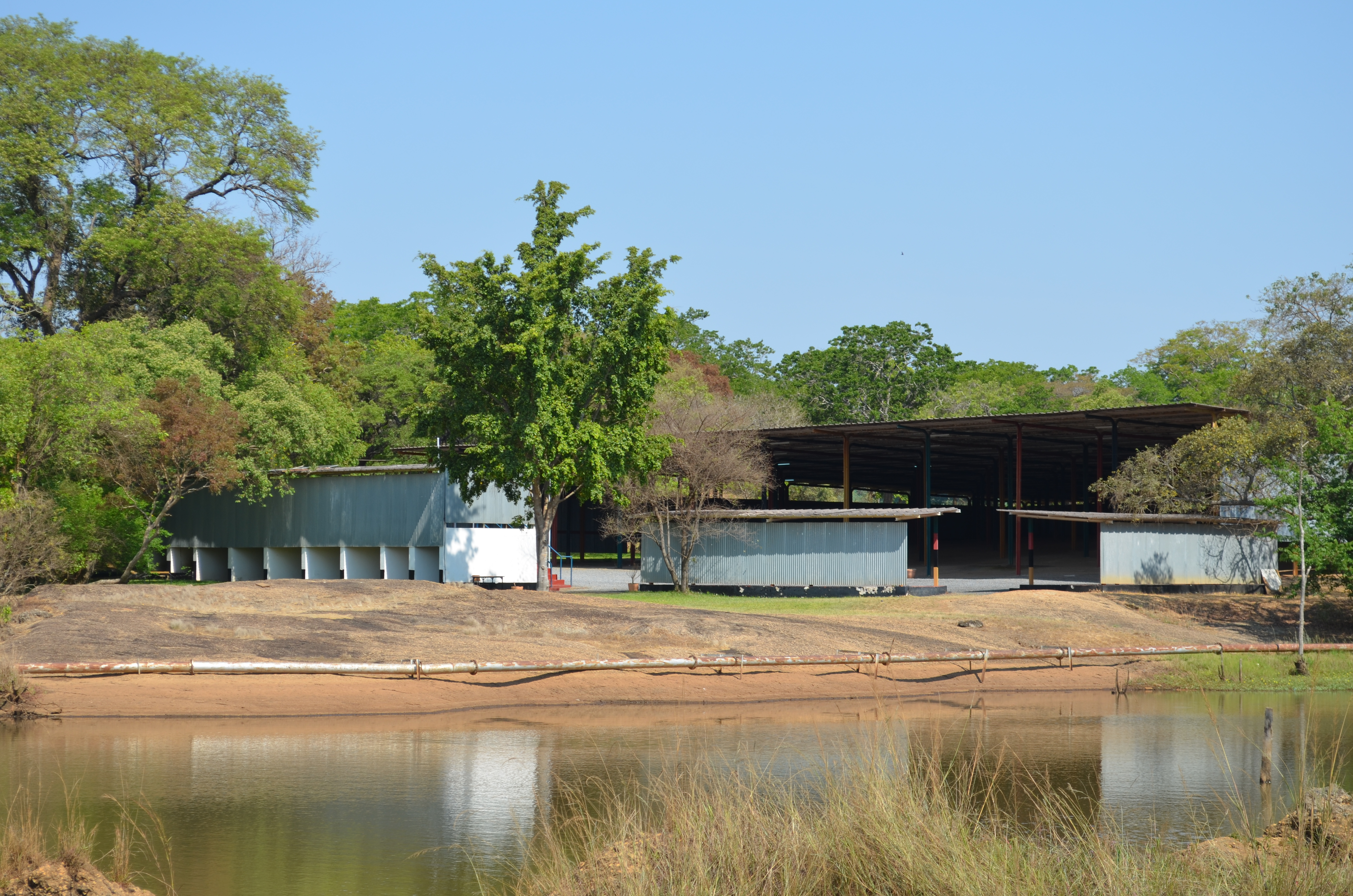
Meeting place near the Mulungushi Rock of Authority, on the campus of Mulungushi University (Great North Road Campus)

More than 2,000 people attended that 1960 conference, which put the UNIP on the political map and helped it become the primary party in the Zambian independence movement. Joseph Katampi, party secretary from the Mkushi constituency, recalled in 2014:

"When we gathered at Mulungushi Rock, we resolved to take any course of action by using any means to indicate our seriousness about independence to the white government ... we resolved not to compromise with the British government's interest of giving us the Macleod constitution but a constitution that allowed for one man, one vote".

After Zambia achieved independence in 1964, the UNIP staged its annual conference and other meetings at Mulungushi Rock, including the 1967 council meeting noted for Simon Kapwepwe's announcing his candidacy for vice-president of the party and Kaunda resigning from the party presidency for a few hours. The UNIP also used the site for major policy addresses, such as the Mulungushi Reforms of 1968 and a major land policy reform in 1975. According to O'Sullivan, the site began to be called the Rock of Authority "with the party's decisions handed down with quasi-divine authority as from an oracle".

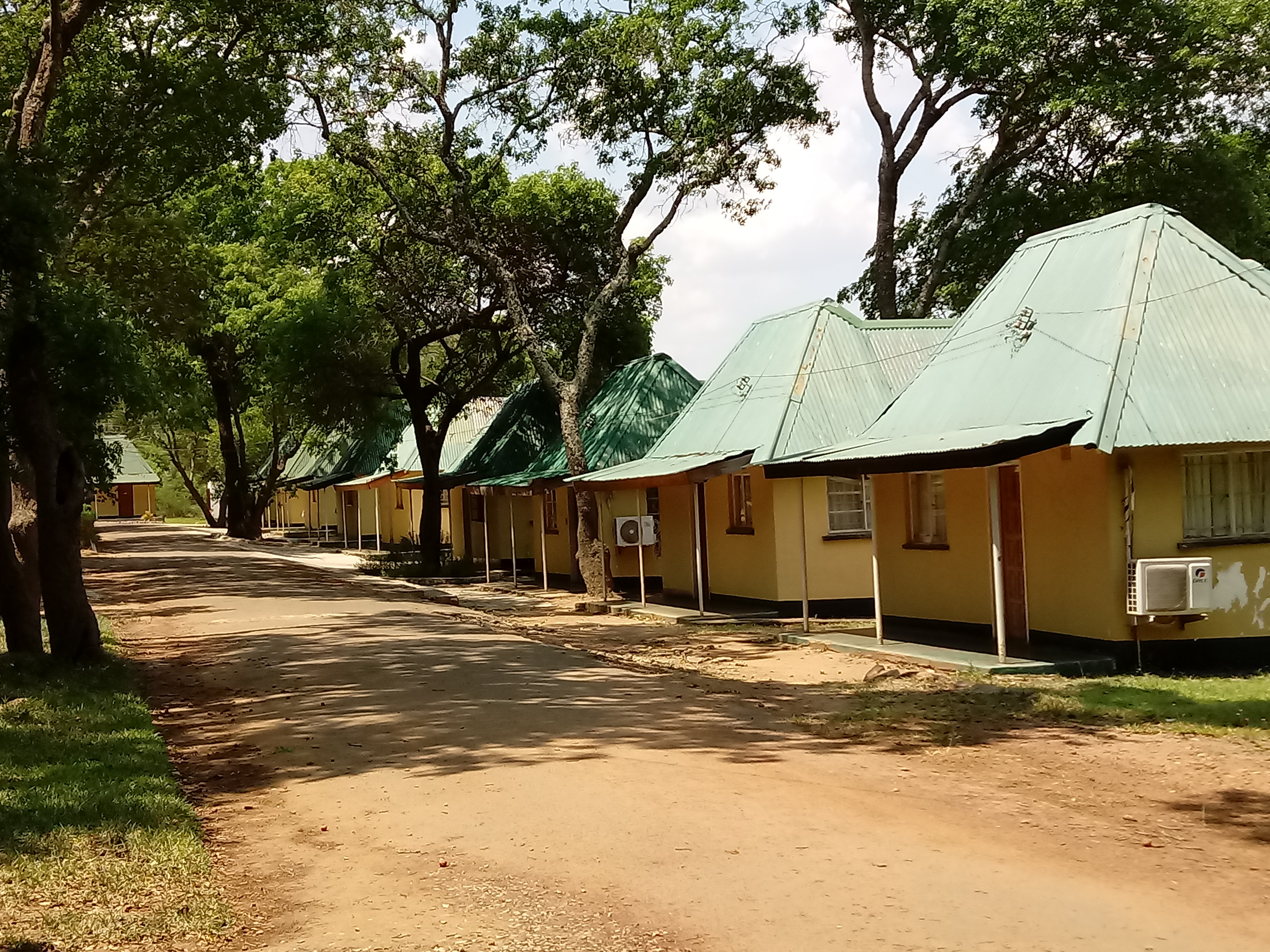
Chalets near the Mulungushi Rock of Authority, on the campus of Mulungushi University (Great North Road Campus)

The Rock of Authority went on to become the venue for many other political events, including conventions of the Movement for Multi-Party Democracy and the Patriotic Front. Labour groups also conduct conferences here. Since 2009, Mulungushi University has held its annual graduation ceremony at the Rock of Authority.

Although the Rock is often said to be located in Kabwe, it is in fact located outside that city. In 1994 the Rock was incorporated into the Kapiri Mposhi District, as was nearby Mulungushi University. The Mulungushi River serves as the boundary between Kabwe and the Kapiri Mposhi District.

== Nearby facilities ==
In 1972 the UNIP founded an institute for labour studies, the President's Citizens College, near the Rock of Authority.

A branch of Mulungushi University was established a few kilometres away in January 2008. The university erected a commercial centre to accommodate groups indoors; most political conventions are now held there. The centre includes a conference room with capacity for 1,000 attendees, 21 chalet-style apartments, and a restaurant.

== Sources ==
- Mbikusita-Lewanika, Akashambatwa (2005). A Mulungushi Experience: MMD 5th National Convention. African Lineki Courier. ISBN 9982872001.
- Mwakikagile, Godfrey (2010). Zambia: Life in an African Country. New Africa Press. ISBN 978-9987160112.
- O'Sullivan, Owen (1997). The Silent Schism: Renewal of Catholic spirit and structures. Gill & Macmillan. ISBN 0717125602.
- Zulu, Alexander Grey (2007), "Discovery of Mulungushi (Rock of Authority) Conference Site", The memoirs of Alexander Grey Zulu, Times Printpak Zambia, ISBN 978-9982130622
