= Revolutionary Socialist Party (Zambia) =

- Leader: Samson Banda
- Founded: 1991
- Dissolved: March 1998
- Ideology: Socialism; Revolutionary socialism

The Revolutionary Socialist Party was a political party in Zambia led by Samson Banda. The party issued its draft programme in 1991. The party was part of an alliance led by UNIP.

RSP was one of several leftwing groups that sprung up in Zambia during the 1990s. It suffered from lack of financial resources and organisational capacity. The party was de-registered in March 1998.
