= Theatre of Zambia =

Zambia is a landlocked country in southern Africa. Modern Zambian theatre has developed syncretically from the melding of traditional local ritual and ceremonial forms of dance, drama and narrative storytelling, with Western theatre that was introduced during the colonial period.

== About ==
=== Traditional dance and dramatic forms ===
Zambia is homeland to seventy-three Bantu peoples, each with their own language. Traditional rituals and ceremonies of the region incorporated dance and/or dramatic elements included:

- kuombaka — a royal seasonal ceremony (Lozi)
- makishi — a masquerade (Eastern Province)
- ncwala — a commemoration of victories (Nguni)
- nyau kasinja — a funeral dance (Eastern Province)
- umutomboko — a celebration of the rule of Mwata Kazembe, which re-enacted the crossing of the Luapula River (Eastern Lunda)

Additionally, there were widespread traditions of oral storytelling, particularly fables featuring the trickster hare Kalulu and other animals, which promoted moral behaviour and satirised human foibles.

=== Colonial and post-colonial dance and drama ===
Performance of traditional rituals and ceremonies was discouraged by European colonisers of Northern Rhodesia and its predecessor territories. The mixing of ethnic traditions due to urbanisation in new copper mining towns, and in some cases a gradual shift from ritual to commercial performance, resulted in new syncretic dance and dramatic forms.

Western theatre was also introduced. The Northern Rhodesian Drama Association (later the Theatre Association of Zambia, TAZ), a whites-only organisation, was founded in 1952 and over the next few years several similarly-segregated theatres were constructed. Segregation was overturned in 1958 when the newly-formed multi-racial Waddington Theatre Club were permitted to join the association.

Radio broadcasting was significant in the development of local drama. The Central African Broadcasting Services was founded in 1948 by Harry Franklin, a government information officer, and targeted indigenous listeners, with programs not only in English but in a variety of local languages. Africans trained in radio techniques included Andreya Masiye, author of Zambia's first full-length play; his 1973 The Lands of Kazembe performed at the Chikwakwa Theatre adapted his 1957 radio play Kazembe and the Portuguese. In addition to formally-written plays, radio also broadcast ongoing improvised plays. For instance, Malikopo was a long-running weekly satirical radio drama in siTonga starring Edward Mungoni. It began in 1947 and was still popular into the nineteen-eighties.It is worth noting however that during the colonial period there was no publication of a stage play written by an indigenous Zambian despite the fact that the Zambian publishing industry was born in 1937 when the colonial Northern Rhodesian government established the African Literature Committee.

The indigenous Zambian Arts Trust formed in 1963. It toured with a repertoire of plays in Zambian languages and English, and ran theatre festivals.One of the distinguishing features of the plays written and performed by indigenous Zambians is that they drew inspiration and some materials from the Zambian oral traditions which included performances such as the oral narratives which are associated with traditional forms of dramatic expression. As Chilala argues in his article 'The African Narrative as a Tool of Education' African playwrights, including Zambians, have been known to blend traditional art forms and western dramatic concepts.

UNZADRAMS, the University of Zambia's drama society, was pivotal in the development of Zambian theatre, both as a foundation for future developments and in reaction to it. UNZADRAMS produced Zambian plays, built the open air Chikwakwa Theatre, instituted a touring company, and produced The Chikwakwa Review, a journal.

In 1975, the black-led Zambian National Theatre Arts Association (ZANTAA) was formed in opposition to TAZ due to dissatisfaction with the attitude of its predominantly white leadership towards non-western theatre. In 1986, Kebby Musokotwane, then Zambia's Minister of General Education and Culture, directed that the two organisations be merged to form the National Theatre Arts Association of Zambia (NATAAZ).

=== Modern ===
An organized Western-styled theatre movement can be found in Lusaka and other urban settings, but traditional dramatic arts are also part of the fabric of traditional life in many rural communities. In recent years, drama has been an especially important avenue for the fight against HIV/AIDS in Zambia.
