= Lunga River (Zambia) =

Location
- Country: Zambia

Physical characteristics
- Mouth
  - coordinates: 14°00′S 26°20′E

The Lunga River is the name of two rivers in Zambia. One is a tributary of the Kafue River and the other a tributary of the Kabompo River, both of which are tributaries of the Zambezi. There is also a West Lunga National Park.
