= Girl Guides Association of Zambia =

National Guiding organization of Zambia

- Girl Guides Association of Zambia
- Headquarters: Lusaka, 6789 lubu road, longacres
- Location: Lusaka
- Country: Zambia
- Founded: 1924
- Membership: 101,236
- Matron: Thandiwe Banda
- Chief Commissioner: Mrs Mushiku
- Affiliation: World Association of Girl Guides and Girl Scouts

The Girl Guides Association of Zambia is the national Guiding organization of Zambia. It serves 23,662 members (as of 2009). Founded in 1924 as the Guides of Northern Rhodesia, the girls-only organization became a full member of the World Association of Girl Guides and Girl Scouts in 1966.

The Girl Guide emblem features the head of a kudu.

In October 2009, First Lady Thandiwe Banda was installed as Matron of the association.

== See also ==
- Zambia Scouts Association
- Betty Clay
