= Mita Hills Dam =

Dam in Zambia

Coordinates: 14.231829°S 29.122092°E

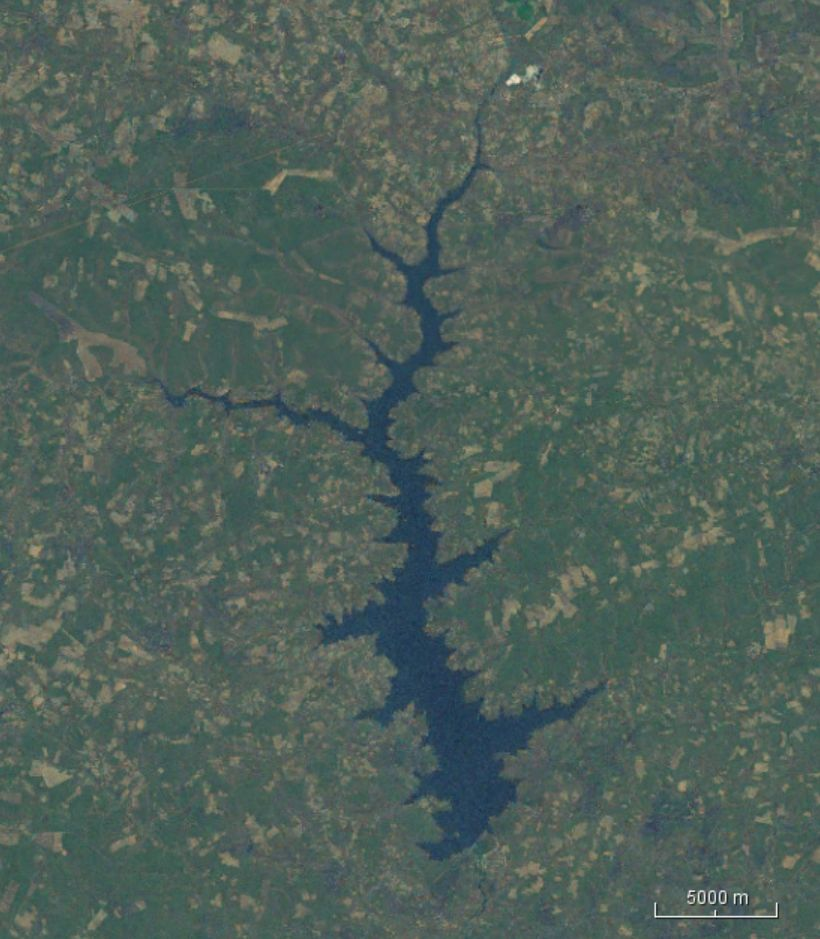
Satellit photo of the reservoir

Mita Hills Dam is an embankment dam with a hydroelectric power station and reservoir located near Kabwe, in the Central Province of Zambia. Construction of the dam began in 1955.

The reservoir is approximately 30 km long by 3-5 km wide. Bream dominate the fish species in the lake.
