= Lunsemfwa River =

River in Zambia

Coordinates: 14°50′S 29°15′E

The Luangwa basin with the Lunsemfwa (bottom left)

The Lunsemfwa River is a tributary of the Luangwa River in Zambia and part of the Zambezi River basin. It is a popular river for fishing, containing large populations of tigerfish and bream.

It rises on the south-central African plateau at an elevation of about 1,250 metres (4,100 ft) to the north of Mkushi and south of the border of Congo Pedicle, and flows south. It is used to generate hydroelectric power for the Kabwe mines through the Mita Hills Dam, built in the 1950s with a reservoir about 30 kilometres (19 mi) long by 3 to 5 kilometres (1.9 to 3.1 mi) wide, and another power station at Lunsemfwa Falls.

About 30 kilometres (19 mi) below the dam it enters a remote and inaccessible gorge which it has cut back into the plateau from the edge of the Luangwa Rift Valley into which it flows. Known as the Lunsemfwa Wonder Gorge it is 20 kilometres (12 mi) long, up to 500 metres (1,600 ft) deep and about 1 kilometre (0.6 mi) wide at the top.

A viewpoint called Bell Point overlooks the confluence of the Lunsemfwa and its tributary the Mkushi River, about 15 kilometres (9.3 mi) along the gorge, and can be reached on a dirt track.

The Lunsemfwa enters the Luangwa River rift valley about 40 kilometres (25 mi) from its western end, where the valley is about 45 kilometres (28 mi) wide. It flows to the middle of the valley and turns east as a meandering river with oxbow lakes and a floodplain 1 to 2 kilometres (0.6 to 1.2 mi) wide. About 100 kilometres (62 mi) further on it merges with the Lukusashi coming from the north-east, and the combined river turns south towards the Luangwa River.
