= Kabwe =

- Town
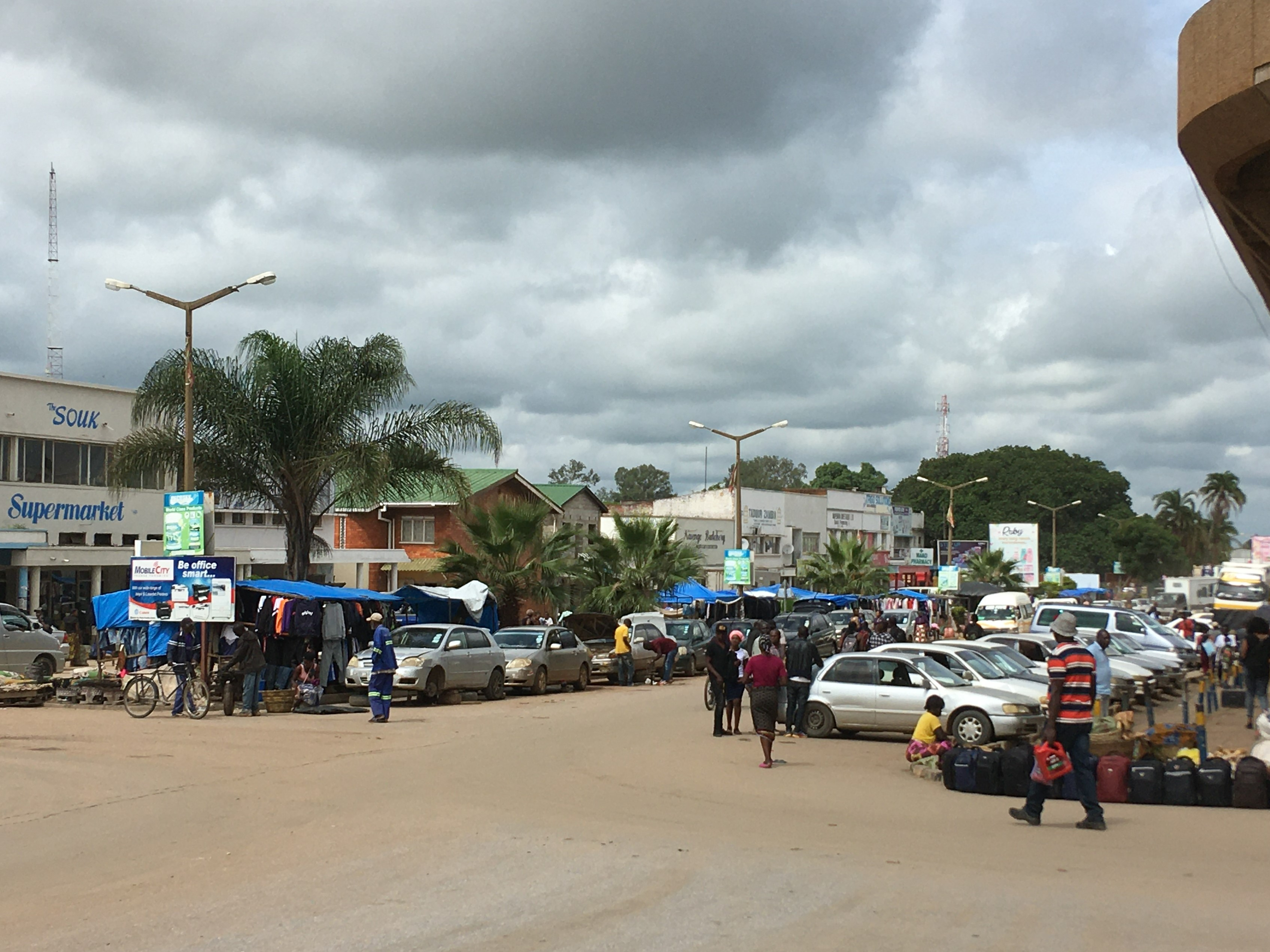
- Downtown Kabwe, looking down Freedom Way, with the Big Tree National Monument in the distance

- Location in Zambia
- Coordinates: 14°26′S 28°27′E
- Country: Zambia
- Province: Central Province
- District: Kabwe District

Government
- Elevation: 1,182 m (3,878 ft)

Population (2022 census)
  - Total: 288,598
- Time zone: UTC+2 (CAT)
- Climate: Cwa

Kabwe is the capital of the Zambian Central Province and the Kabwe District, with a population estimated at 288,598 at the 2022 census. Named Broken Hill until 1966, it was founded when lead and zinc deposits were discovered in 1902. Kabwe also has a claim to being the birthplace of Zambian politics as it was an important political centre during the colonial period.

Kabwe is an important transportation, farming and university centre. Kabwe is becoming a major agricultural hub for the country is the headquarters for Zambia Railways and prison services. Additionally the mining industry has been important to the economic development of the region. However, because of the exceptional contamination of the city with lead and other toxins, and the effects of these on local children's health, a March 2022 report by the UN Special Rapporteur on Human Rights and the Environment identified the town as a sacrifice zone for industry.

== History ==
=== Headquarters of Zambia Railways ===
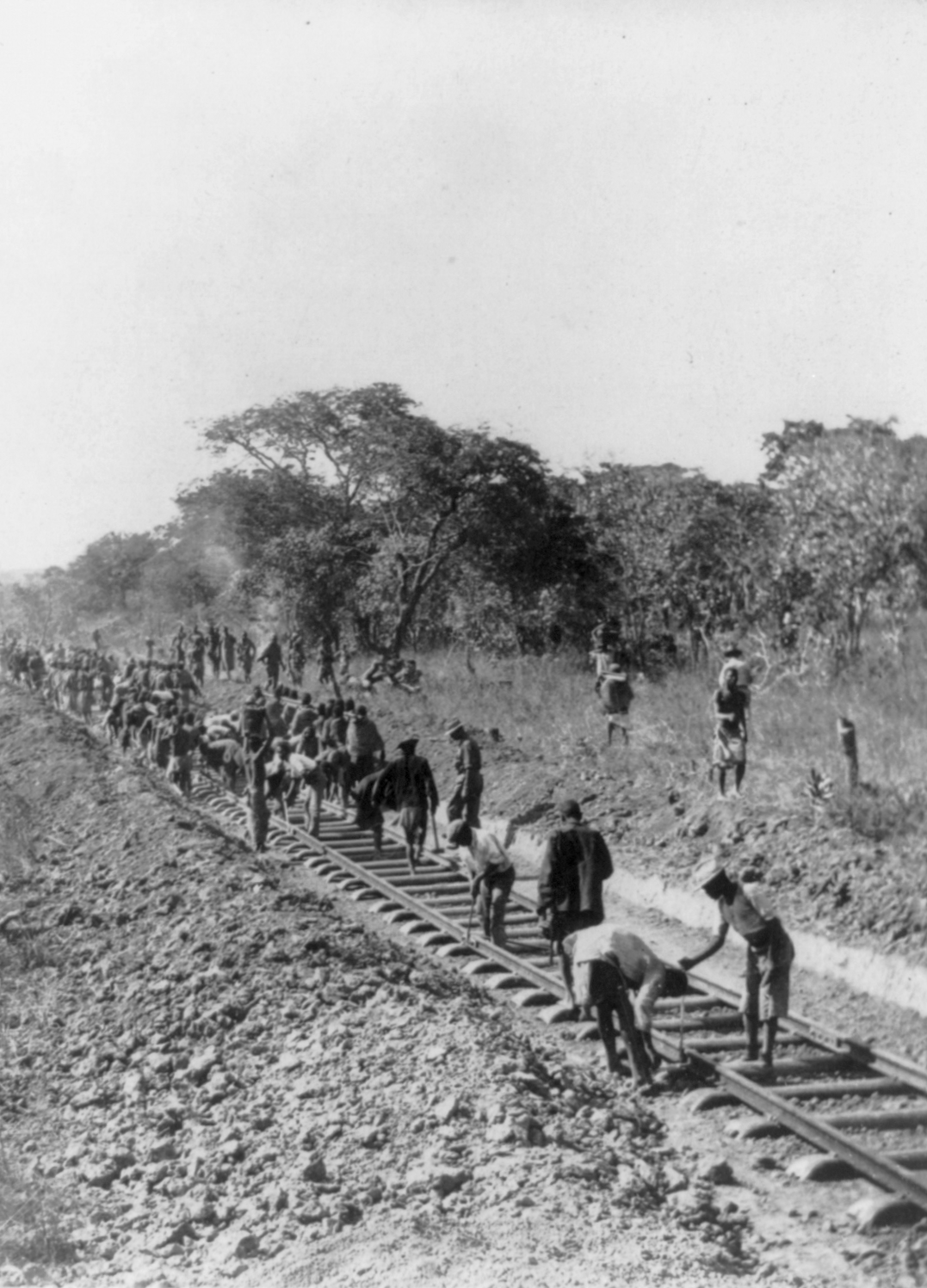
Part of the railway near Kabwe under construction (ca. 1906)

The first railway in the country, operated by Rhodesian Railways when the territory was administered as North-Western Rhodesia the rail line reached Broken Hill mine as early as 1906, and the town became the northern base for the railway, which was the second biggest employer after the mining industry. A locomotive maintenance facility was constructed there. In 1909 the railway reached Ndola in the Lambaland which was to become the Copperbelt.

The railway workers' unions played a large role in the politics of the country. In racially segregated colonial times before Africans had the vote, the town was the seat of Roy Welensky, leader of the powerful Rhodesia Railway Workers Union (RRWU), who became prime minister of the ill-fated Federation of Rhodesia and Nyasaland, which was opposed by the Northern Rhodesia Railway trade union (the black Africans' union) led by Dixon Konkola and also based in Kabwe.

Today, the town is the headquarters of Zambia Railways but employment levels on the railway have been heavily cut.

=== Independence protest ===
Reflecting Kabwe's central location and railway union base, it was chosen as the site for a rally held on October 26, 1958, at Mulungushi Rock north of the city by the Kaunda-Kapwepwe breakaway group from the Zambian African National Congress. Later, they founded the political party UNIP which led the successful independence movement and continued to hold conferences at Mulungushi Rock, which became known as the 'birthplace of independence' in Zambia.

== Demographics ==
Census	Population
1990	154,318
2000	176,758
2010	202,360
2022	288,598

== Districts ==
=== Makululu ===
A large informal settlement on the outskirts of the city, Makululu is an important district in the town. The settlement is on the edge of the Lukanga Swamp, and is thus vulnerable to flooding. Similarly, the water is highly contaminated from both poor sanitation and the broader industrial pollution from the mine.

== Environmental issues ==
=== Mine pollution ===
A study by the Blacksmith Institute found Kabwe to be one of the ten most polluted places in the world due mostly to heavy metal (mostly zinc and lead) tailings making their way into the local water supply. A 2014 report indicates that children's blood lead levels continue to be elevated even though mining has stopped. A 2020 study, found high levels of lead and cadmium in blood levels. A March 2022 report by the UN Special Rapporteur on Human Rights and the Environment identified the town as a sacrifice zone for industry.

Other studies, have found high potential for copper, cobalt and other non-lead materials in leachate from the mine.

A class action lawsuit was launched against Anglo American plc, alleging that it ignored the required safety standards despite knowing about the harms caused. Anglo-American was the majority owner of the mine from 1925 until its 1974 nationalization by the Zambian government. A certification hearing was held at the High Court of South Africa's Johannesburg branch in February 2023.

== Transportation ==
Kabwe is on the T2 road (Great North Road) to Kapiri Mposhi in the north (with a branch route to Ndola) and Lusaka in the south. It is also on the Zambia Railways line.

=== Accidents and incidents ===
On February 7, 2013, a bus collided with two cars south of Kabwe, killing 53 people.

== Industries and agriculture ==
Historically the economy of Kabwe has been dominated by the mine. Other industries include pharmaceuticals, milling and cotton ginning, and Kabwe's first Drinking Water Plant (Aquador Purifed Water) and leather tanning.

To the east of the city are the hydro-electric power stations of the Mulungushi Dam, Mita Hills Dam and Lunsemfwa Falls, built to power the mine and town.

Commercial farming areas surround the city about 10 km from the centre, and the road and rail links provide ready access to the markets of the Copperbelt and Lusaka.

=== Mine ===
The name Kabwe or Kabwe-Ka Mukuba means 'ore' or 'smelting' but the European/Australian prospectors named it Broken Hill after a similar mine in Broken Hill, New South Wales, Australia. The mine was the largest in the country for around thirty years until it was overtaken in the early 1930s by larger copper mining complexes on the Copperbelt. Apart from lead and zinc it also produced silver, manganese and heavy metals such as cadmium, vanadium, and titanium in smaller quantities.

In 1921 a human fossil, a skull, dubbed Kabwe 1, also "Broken Hill Man" or "Rhodesian Man" (classified as Homo rhodesiensis or Homo heidelbergensis) was found in the mine.

Anglo American plc became the majority owner of the mine in 1925, until the mine was nationalized in 1974 by the Zambian government, who closed it in 1994.

The mine, which occupies a 2.5 km^{2} site 1 km south-west of the town centre, is closed but metals are still extracted from old tailings.

Closure of the mine led to economic decline for Kabwe. It has a number of manufacturing industries including the Zambia-China Mulungushi textiles plant established with Chinese investment in the 1980s, but after suffering large losses this plant closed (temporarily according to management) at the beginning of 2007.

== Climate ==
Kabwe has a subtropical highland climate (Cwa) with warm, wet summers, mild dry winters and hot springs.

Climate data for Kabwe (1991–2020, extremes 1961–2020)
Month	Jan	Feb	Mar	Apr	May	Jun	Jul	Aug	Sep	Oct	Nov	Dec	Year
Record high °C (°F)	35.2 (95.4)	33.7 (92.7)	37.5 (99.5)	33.0 (91.4)	32.3 (90.1)	32.6 (90.7)	30.8 (87.4)	35.2 (95.4)	37.2 (99.0)	38.6 (101.5)	38.5 (101.3)	36.5 (97.7)	38.6 (101.5)
Mean daily maximum °C (°F)	27.9 (82.2)	27.9 (82.2)	28.0 (82.4)	27.5 (81.5)	26.4 (79.5)	24.6 (76.3)	24.1 (75.4)	27.1 (80.8)	30.7 (87.3)	32.4 (90.3)	31.1 (88.0)	28.4 (83.1)	28.0 (82.4)
Daily mean °C (°F)	23.0 (73.4)	22.9 (73.2)	22.6 (72.7)	21.2 (70.2)	19.4 (66.9)	17.2 (63.0)	16.9 (62.4)	19.6 (67.3)	23.1 (73.6)	25.3 (77.5)	25.0 (77.0)	23.4 (74.1)	21.6 (70.9)
Mean daily minimum °C (°F)	18.1 (64.6)	17.9 (64.2)	17.1 (62.8)	14.9 (58.8)	12.3 (54.1)	9.7 (49.5)	9.6 (49.3)	12.1 (53.8)	15.5 (59.9)	18.1 (64.6)	18.8 (65.8)	18.3 (64.9)	15.2 (59.4)
Record low °C (°F)	10.1 (50.2)	10.4 (50.7)	9.0 (48.2)	8.2 (46.8)	5.9 (42.6)	1.1 (34.0)	3.4 (38.1)	3.6 (38.5)	4.4 (39.9)	8.9 (48.0)	11.0 (51.8)	9.4 (48.9)	1.1 (34.0)
Average precipitation mm (inches)	210.6 (8.29)	185.8 (7.31)	110.1 (4.33)	21.1 (0.83)	2.9 (0.11)	0.0 (0.0)	1.1 (0.04)	0.0 (0.0)	1.2 (0.05)	6.6 (0.26)	102.1 (4.02)	218.6 (8.61)	860.2 (33.87)
Average relative humidity (%)	81.3	81.3	78.6	72.6	64.8	60.2	56.4	48.1	40.7	44.0	60.9	78.0	63.9
Mean monthly sunshine hours	179.8	165.2	220.1	258.0	282.1	279.0	300.7	316.2	297.0	285.2	222.0	173.6	2,978.9
Source: NOAA (humidity, sun 1961–1990)

== Institutions and attractions ==
- Mulungushi Rock of Authority, north of the city
- Mulungushi University
- Kabwe Warriors football club
- Zambia National Service Training School
- Chindwin Barracks and Kohima Barracks (Zambian Defence Force)
- Mulungushi Boat Club, Mulungushi Dam
- Kwame Nkrumah University, a public institution of higher education
- Paglory University
- Ellensmere High School

== Notable people ==
- Wilbur Smith, novelist
- Michael Norgrove, boxer
- Tutwa Ngulube, politician
- Tommy Tiernan, comedian - lived here
Images of Kabwe
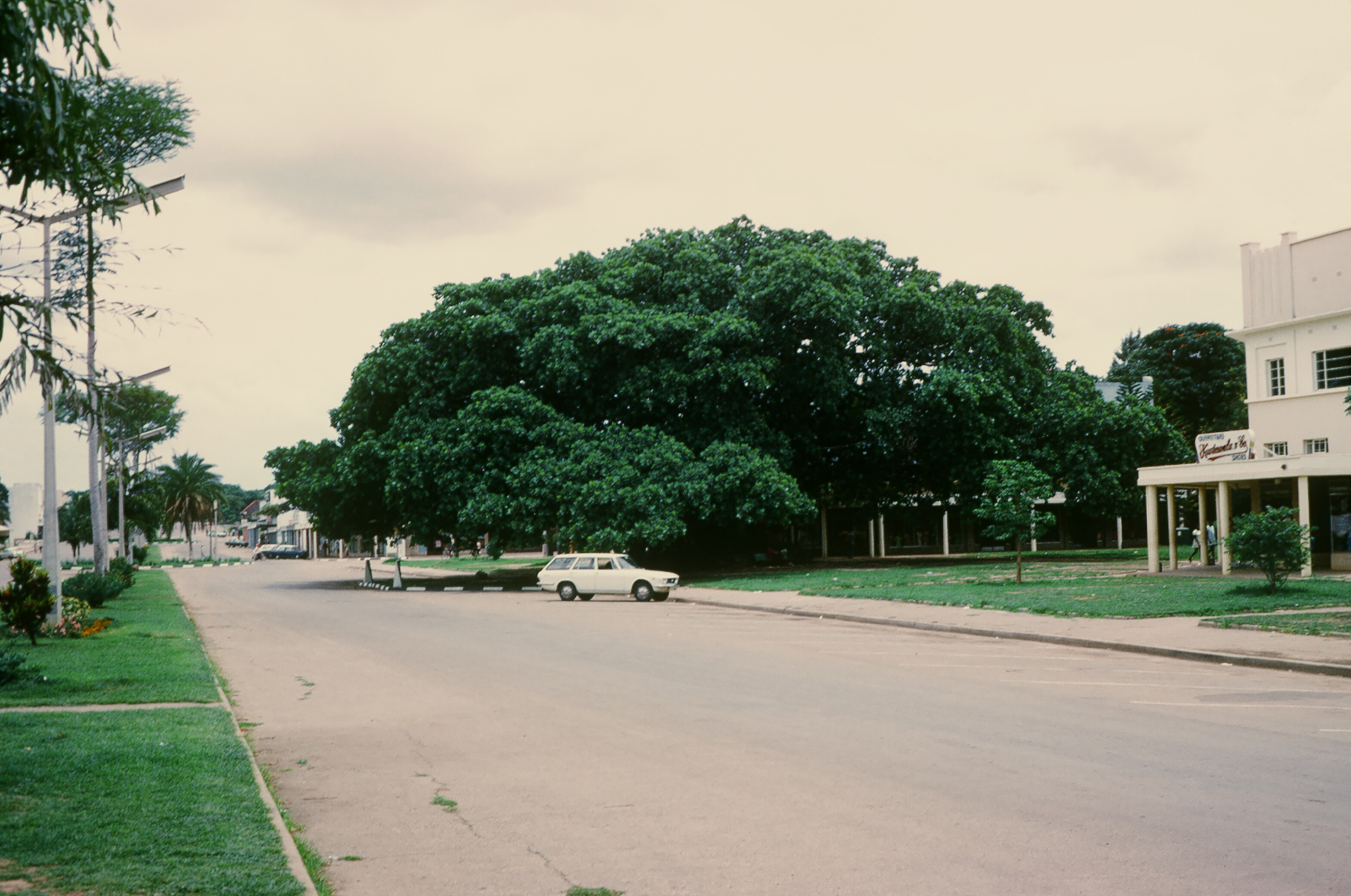
The Big Tree National Monument, a large fig tree (Ficus sycomorus) historically used as a meeting place and now converted into a park (1974)

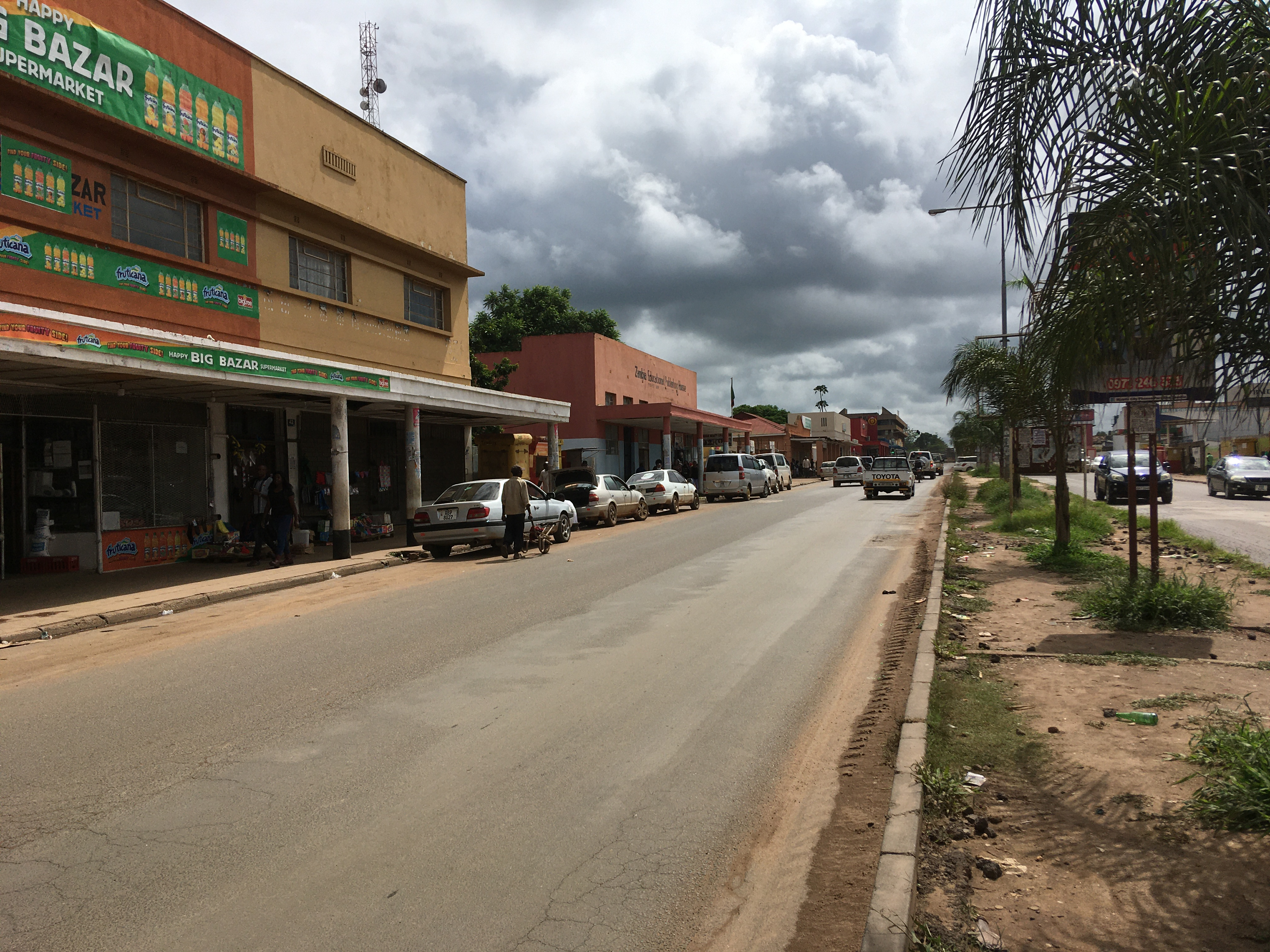
The Great North Road (T2) in Kabwe, just east of its intersection with Buntungwa Street

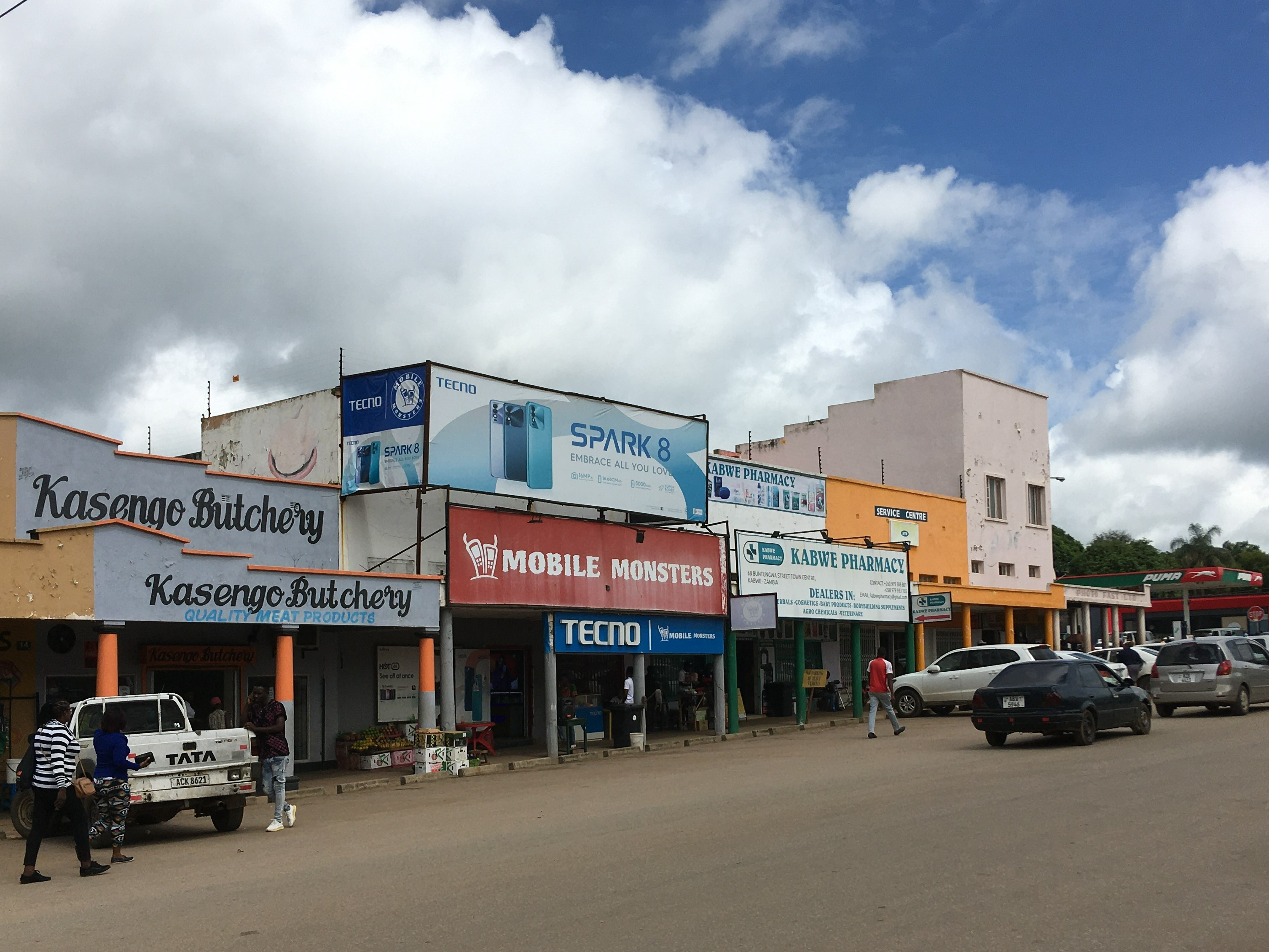
Buntungwa Street, Kabwe, near intersection with the Great North Road (T2)

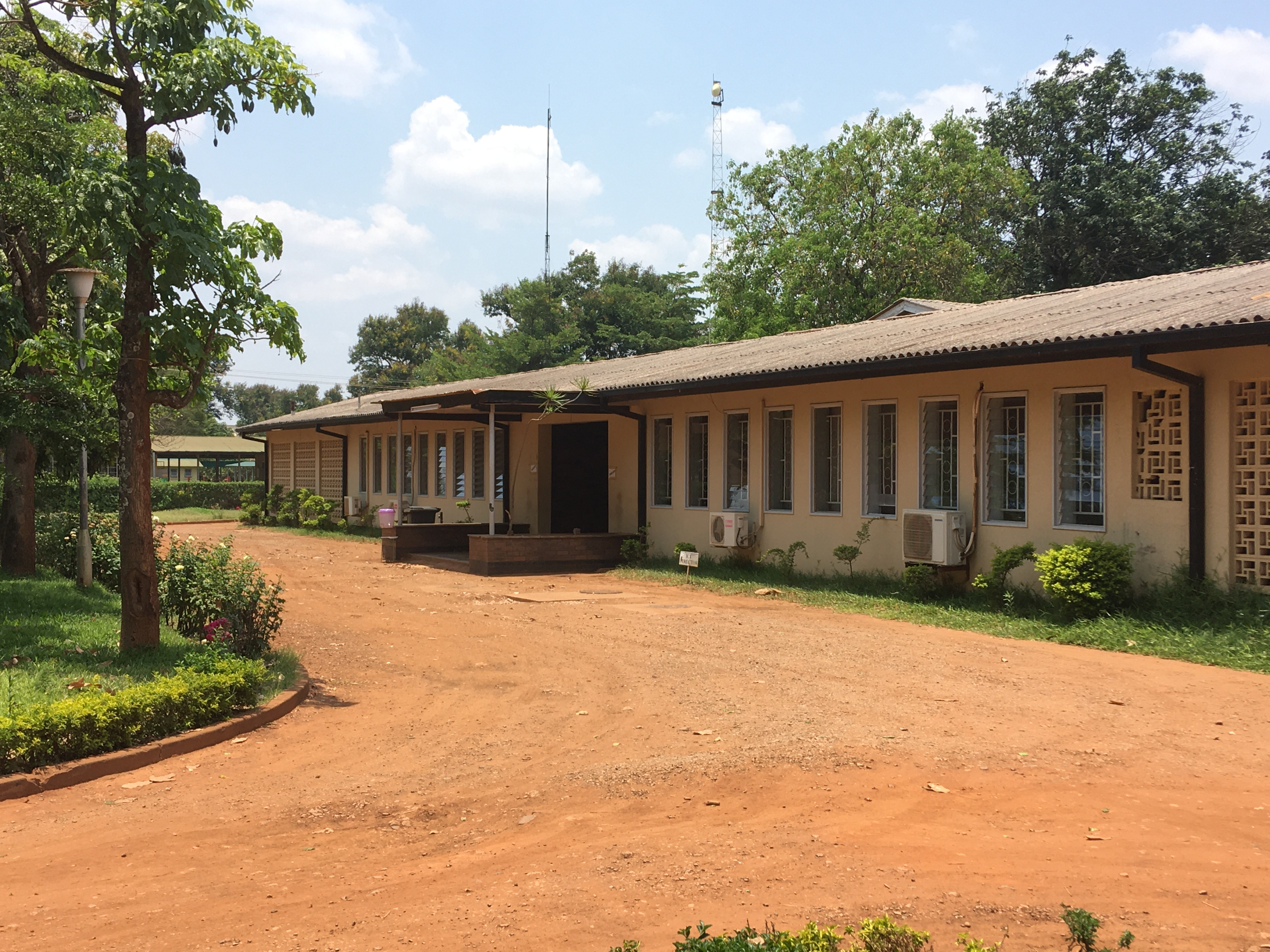
Classroom building at the Kabwe Town Campus of Mulungushi University

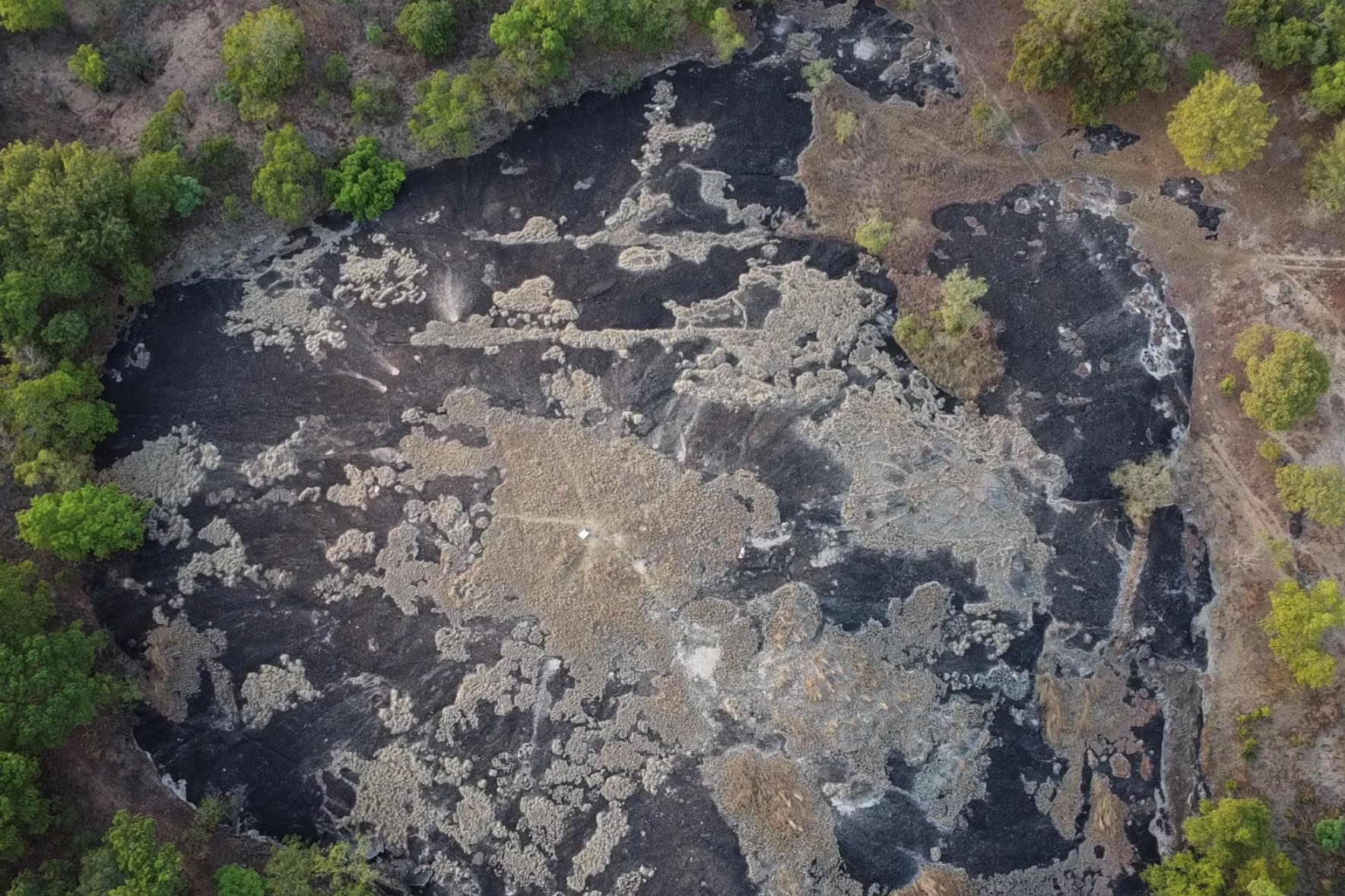
Aerial view of the Mulungushi Rock of Authority, birthplace of the Zambian independence movement

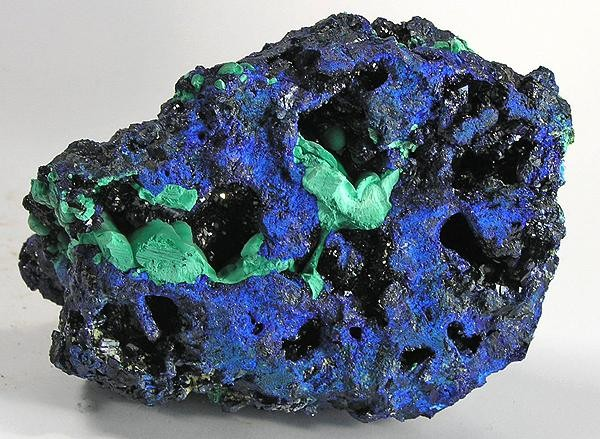
Azurite with green Malachite from the Kabwe Mine
