= Zambia Scouts Association =

National Scouting association of Zambia

- Country: Zambia
- Membership: 7,396
- Affiliation: World Organization of the Scout Movement

The Zambia Scouts Association is the national Scouting association of Zambia and became a member of the World Organization of the Scout Movement in 1965. It shares history with Zimbabwe and Malaŵi, with which it was linked for decades. As of 2004 the Association had 7,396 members.

== History ==
Scouting in the former Rhodesia and Nyasaland started in 1909 when the first Boy Scout troop was registered. Scouting grew quickly and in 1924 Rhodesia and Nyasaland sent a large contingent to the second World Scout Jamboree in Ermelunden, Denmark.

The great popularity of the Boy Scout movement was due to its outdoor program such as hiking, camping, cooking and pioneering, which was unusual in the protectorate. Additionally, the training and progressive badge system was targeted towards helping others, leading to responsible citizenship.

Because of the prevailing circumstances earlier in the 20th century, a separate movement was established for black Africans called "Pathfinders". By the 1950s the time was considered to merge both movements into one Scout Association.

In 1973, Kenan H. Ng'ambi was awarded the Bronze Wolf, the only distinction of the World Organization of the Scout Movement, awarded by the World Scout Committee for exceptional services to world Scouting.

== Program and ideals ==
Eagle Award badge

Scouting is active after the many political disturbances in the area. There is a plan for recovery which has been completed. There is an emphasis on rural Scouting and community service. They have rebuilt their headquarters, campsites and training centers.

The Scout Association runs the Kabwata Trade School. Here, unemployed youth are trained in carpentry and woodworking. There are plans to expand the activities to include metalworking, masonry and tailoring. The program is also to be expanded to include rural areas and include farming.

The highest rank is the Eagle Award. The Scout Motto is Uwe Tayari, Be Prepared in Swahili.

The Scout emblem of the Zambia Scouts Association features an eagle, a symbol in use since Zambia was a colonial branch of British Scouting.

== See also ==
- Girl Guides Association of Zambia
- Betty Clay
