= Ecoregions of Zambia =

The biomes and ecoregions in the ecology of Zambia are described, listed and mapped here, following the World Wildlife Fund's classification scheme for terrestrial ecoregions, and the WWF freshwater ecoregion classification for rivers, lakes and wetlands. Zambia is in the Zambezian region of the Afrotropical biogeographic realm (or ecozone). Three terrestrial biomes are well represented in the country (with an additional one extending a few kilometres over the border). The distribution of the biomes and ecoregions is governed mainly by the physical environment, especially climate.

== Physical environment ==
The main aspects of the physical environment which determine the biomes and ecoregions of Zambia are: climate, specifically rainfall amount, length of the dry season, and temperature, which is related to elevation; and soils and bushfires.

=== Climate ===
==== Rainfall ====
Rainfall amount is the most important determinant of the type and distribution of ecoregions. Zambia experiences good rainfall, with extremes of 500 to 1400 mm (most areas fall into the range 700 to ) in a distinct rainy season of four to six months centred on January, when the moist Intertropical Convergence Zone is over the country. The highest rainfall is in the north (about 1200 mm –- all figures are annual amounts), especially the north-west (1400 mm), decreasing towards the south (around 700 mm); the driest areas are in the Luangwa and middle Zambezi valleys (500 mm). None of the country is arid.

==== Dry season and drought resistance ====
The dry season lasts 6–8 months, divided into the cool dry season or winter from April or May to August, followed by the hot dry season, September to November. Most rivers, lakes and swamps are permanent, except in the hotter, drier south. Along the banks of permanent rivers and in the spray of waterfalls are evergreen thickets similar in character to tropical rainforest, relics of a wetter past. In dambos (complex shallow wetlands in higher-rainfall flat plateau areas, with river-like branching forms, appearing as grasslands in the dry season, comprising 12.5% of the area of Zambia) and other marshes, soil water is available throughout the dry season, but they may be rather acidic. Elsewhere, plants and animals are adapted to the long dry season. For plants this includes the deciduous habit (losing leaves to conserve water), very deep root systems, water-storing roots and tubers, waxy leaf cuticles, and drought-resistant seeds. Succulent plants are also widespread, especially in rocky areas. For animals, adaptations to drought are seen in migration and breeding patterns, as well as the ability, found in rodents and reptiles especially, to obtain water requirements from food without the need to drink. Hibernation through the dry season is practiced by some amphibians and invertebrates. The latter may also survive the dry season through drought-resistant forms.

==== Temperature and elevation ====
The elevation of the great central African plateau on which Zambia is located, typically between 1000 and 1300 metres, modifies temperatures, which are lower than for coastal areas at the same latitude, and pleasant for much of the year. On the plateau (covering about 80% of the country) mean minimums for June in the cool dry season are in the range 6–12 °C, mean maximums for October, the hot dry season are 28–35 °C. Frost only occurs on a few days in winter on the highest exposed hills, or more widely in the lower humidity areas of the southern half of the country. Plants susceptible to frost do not grow in the southern half of the country. Otherwise temperature by itself is not a great determinant of plant and animal distribution. Temperatures are higher at lower elevations, such as the Luapula-Mweru and Mweru-Wantipa/Tanganyika valleys in the north, and highest in the lower Luangwa and Zambezi valleys in the south, typically experiencing 40 °C in October. One way in which temperature affects the distribution of large mammals is through the distribution of the tsetse fly, which, within its range is found in hotter valleys rather than the higher, cooler plateau. Species susceptible to trypanosomiasis are not found in such valleys.

==== Soils ====
The broad types of soil found in Zambia are:

- red sandveld soils cover most of the country, and are generally not very fertile due to weathering and leaching; the top soil is sandy and is more fertile where the top soil has a higher clay content.
- Grey dambo soils contain more nutrients but are waterlogged in the rainy season and often very acidic, restricting the plants which can grow there to sedges and wiry grasses tolerant of marshy conditions.
- Black soils of floodplains are fertile, grasses grow on them as soon as the annual flood recedes and provide a rich resource for herbivores. If the annual flood is disrupted by dams, woody shrubs of lower nutritional value tend to replace grasses and so reduce the number of herbivores and biodiversity.
- Kalahari Sands in the south-west of the country are infertile and do not retain moisture, so are dominated mostly by deep-rooted trees with little growth in the understorey. Grasslands both flooded and non-flooded also occur there .

In areas where soils are waterlogged for all or part of the year, or are very infertile, sandy or acidic, they take over from climate as the predominant factor in determining the distribution of plants and animals. Such communities are said to be edaphic, and are found on grey dambo soils, black floodplain soils and Kalahari sands.

==== Bush fires ====
Bush fires range across most of the country in the later dry season, escaping from "chitemene cultivation" and caused by villagers burning off crop residue or hunting, as well as by lightning strikes. The vegetation is adapted to it, particularly the grasses, and at that time of the year deciduous trees have lost most of their leaves and so usually do not suffer extensive damage. Prevailing winds are not usually very strong and a lack of a great deal of dry fuel on the ground (since most areas are burnt annually it does not build up) means that the fires are not as devastating as in countries such as Australia and the south-western USA.

== Terrestrial biomes ==
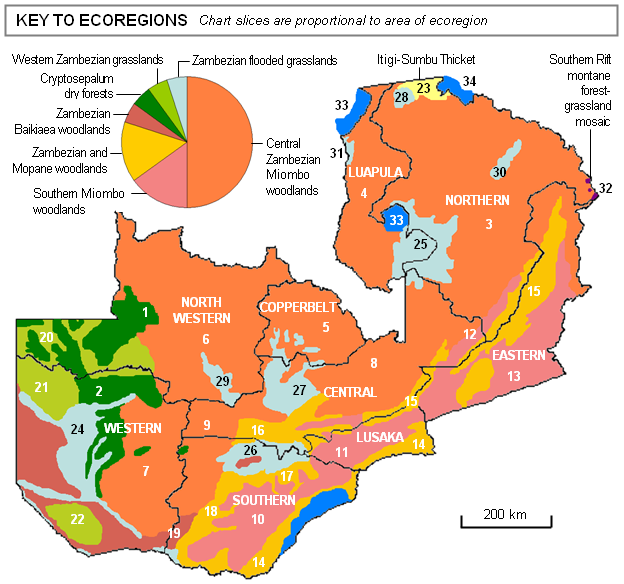
The terrestrial ecoregions of Zambia, superimposed on a map of the provinces. Numbers refer to points in the text.

Rough estimates of the percentage of the country covered as given below are for the original or natural state of the area before urbanisation and agriculture has modified it. The numbers relate to the location labels on the map.

== Tropical and subtropical dry broadleaf forests biome ==
In Zambia this biome is represented by only one ecoregion in a few patches, covering around 5% of the land area.

=== Zambezian Cryptosepalum dry forests ===
Quite dense evergreen forest of medium height on sandy soils with little to no surface water, in several patches which make up the largest evergreen forest in Africa outside of the equatorial zone. The dominant genus, Cryptosepalum, is a tree in the legume family. The lack of water and thickness of the forest has kept the human population low, and despite some poaching and the absence of protection, the forest is still fairly rich in wildlife. The main patches are in:

1 —West Lunga National Park, North-Western Province, stretching south-west to the Kabompo River–Zambezi River confluence.
2 —Western Province between the Kabompo and Luena Rivers

== Tropical and subtropical grasslands, savannas, and shrublands biome ==
Most of Zambia (around 80%) is in this extensive biome. Six ecoregions are represented of which the first four listed below are woodland savannas, consisting of a grass cover 1–2 m high, and hardwood deciduous trees and/or hardwood shrubs, which range in ground coverage from 'scattered' to 'abundant'. Leguminous tree species dominate, which are deciduous, losing leaves in the dry season and producing a flush of new leaves, often reddish, just before the onset of the rains. In higher rainfall areas of Zambia the proportion and size of trees are at the higher extreme for this biome, with a canopy covering up to 40% of the ground and trees often exceeding 10 m in height. However, except in the case of the last ecoregion listed, even where the canopy is extensive, at ground level the woodland is relatively open, affording quite easy passage by animals and people.

=== Central Zambezian Miombo woodlands ===
The most extensive ecoregion covering about 50% of the country, characterised by Miombo trees (Brachystegia sp.), a member of the legume family. This ecoregion predominates in the wettest part of the country, across the northern part of both 'lobes' of the country . On the flat central African plateau the woodland is interspersed with dambos, grassy wetlands forming the headwaters and margins of rivers which may make up to 30% of the ecoregion and which increase biodiversity of the ecoregion. The ecoregion has suffered extensive deforestation, especially in the highly urbanised Copperbelt Province due to charcoal production and clearing for farming, the centre of Central Province (for farming and ranching), and around Kasama and Mansa (charcoal production and chitemene farming). It covers:

3 —Northern Province except flooded grassland areas and Luangwa valley slopes
4 —Luapula Province except flooded grassland areas
5 —Copperbelt Province except for flooded grassland areas in the south-west.
6 —North-Western Province except the Busanga area and far west
7 —the eastern part of Western Province
8 —northern parts of Central Province
9 —Kafue National Park in Central and Southern Provinces, except the north-west corner (Busanga Swamps and plain) in North-Western Province.(also the western part)

=== Southern Miombo woodlands ===
Covering about 15% of the country in the south, and drier than the Central Zambezian ecoregion, trees in this ecoregion are more scattered and generally smaller, and the relative proportion of woody shrubs is greater. Dambos are fewer. Much of the ecoregion in Southern Province (sometimes referred to as the Southern Plateau) and the south-east of Eastern Province (sometimes referred to as the Eastern Plateau) has been cleared for farming and ranching. The main sites are:

10 —the Southern Plateau in Southern Province (the largest commercial farming area of the country)
11 —Lusaka Province except areas close to the Zambezi, Lunsemfwa and Kafue rivers
12 —the Muchinga escarpment in Central and Northern Provinces
13 —most of Eastern Province except the bottom of the Luangwa Valley and a patch of plateau around Petauke

=== Zambezian and Mopane woodlands ===
The Mopane tree Colophospermum mopane is also a legume and grows in hotter locations than the miombo species, and so Mopane woodlands, covering about 15% of the country, replace southern miombo woodlands at lower elevations in valleys in the south of the country, principally:

14 —along the Zambezi and Kariba valleys east of the Caprivi Strip, southern part of Lusaka Province and Lower Zambezi National Park
15 —along the bottom of the Lunsemfwa and Luangwa valleys including North and South Luangwa National Parks closer to the river
16 —in a strip running north of the Kafue Flats in Central Province
17 —in a strip running south of the Kafue Flats in Southern Province
18 —in a strip running from the Kafue Flats to the Caprivi Strip

=== Zambezian Baikiaea woodlands ===
This ecoregion, covering about 5% of Zambia in the south-west, is dominated by Baikiaea plurijuga, Zambian teak. It is well adapted to hot dry areas on sandy soils, and forms extensive forests which have been over-exploited by commercial timber production over the past 75 years, in:

19 —southern part of Western Province and south-west of Southern Province (Mulobezi teak forests), and the sandy plains west and south west of the Barotse floodplain, interspersed with grasslands.

=== Western Zambezian grasslands ===
These are the most extensive non-floodplain grasslands in Zambia, covering about 5% of the country in the west, and support large herds of wildebeest which migrate between western Zambia and Angola. They are found:

20 —Patches in the extreme west of North Western Province, north-west of the Kabompo and Lungwebungu Rivers
21 —Liuwa Plain National Park in Western Province north-west of the Barotse Floodplain (Zambezi River)
22 —Plains within Sioma Ngwezi National Park in Western and North-Western provinces.

=== Itigi-Sumbu thicket ===
This endangered ecoregion is found in only one small area (less than 1%) of northern Zambia, named after Sumbu, and it found is in only location anywhere else, an equally small area of central Tanzania (Itigi). It comprises an almost impenetrable bush consisting of about a hundred plant species woven together so densely that it is virtually impossible to walk through. Around 70% of the Zambian thicket has been lost to land clearing and at the present rate the rest will vanish within 20 years. It is found:

23 —between Lake Mweru Wantipa and Lake Tanganyika at Nsumbu National Park

== Flooded grasslands and savannas biome ==
This biome is represented by one ecoregion. As a country with very distinct rainy and dry seasons, with a high rainfall in the former, and having a fairly flat topography, Zambian rivers and low-lying areas are prone to flooding, and there are extensive permanent swamps. Around 10% of the country is in this biome and its sole ecoregion. Plants, animals and people have evolved to this cycle which in Zambia has been fairly reliable, and it brings a number of ecological advantages which promote biodiversity. The role of termites in building mounds which remain above most of the flood is important as this provides habitats for plants less tolerant of getting waterlogged, as well as safe breeding sites for birds and some animals.

=== Zambezian flooded grasslands ===
The 8 sites listed below form a broad chain running from south-west to north-east. The chain extends into Namibia and Botswana at one end (Caprivi wetlands and Okavango Swamp) and to Tanzania and Kenya at the other. This chain is exploited by birds in their migration and in former times, animals also migrated along the chain. The main sites are:

24 —Barotse floodplain, Luanginga River floodplain and Luena Flats, in Western Province
25 —Bangweulu Swamps and floodplain, Northern and Luapula Provinces
26 —Kafue Flats, Central and Southern Provinces
27 —Lukanga Swamp and floodplains of the Kafue and its tributaries in Central Province and south west Copperbelt Province
28 —Lake Mweru Wantipa/Mweru Marsh floodplain, Northern Province
29 —Busanga Swamps and plain, Kafue National Park, North Western Province
30 —Upper Chambeshi River floodplain, Northern Province
31 —Luapula Swamps south of Lake Mweru, Luapula Province

== Montane grasslands and shrublands biome ==
This biome covers an area of only about 100 km^{2} on the northern border with Malawi, being an extension of a much larger area in Malawi and Tanzania, and so is frequently not counted as present in Zambia. It lies on plateau above 2000 m elevation, with grassland and shrubland dominating. In Zambia a sole ecoregion within the biome is represented.

=== Southern Rift montane forest-grassland mosaic ===
This ecoregion is made up of grassland and shrubland, with a great variety of orchids and wildflowers on exposed hills, with forest in narrow valleys and small depressions. It occurs only on:

32 —Nyika Plateau in the Nyika National Park, 80 km^{2}, and two smaller patches to the north including the Mafinga Hills, on the Malawi border.

== Freshwater ecoregions ==
The great freshwater lakes of Tanganyika, Mweru, Bangweulu and Kariba (an artificial reservoir), together with the smaller lakes such as Mweru Wantipa and Itezhi-Tezhi reservoir, and numerous lagoons and swamps cover about 5% of Zambia. Together with their associated rivers, the WWF categorises these freshwater ecoregions in Zambia:

33 —Bangweulu-Mweru, the upper Congo Basin containing the Chambeshi River, Lake Bangweulu and its swamps, Luapula River, Lake Mweru and the Kalungwishi River.
34 —Lake Tanganyika

Zambezi Basin made up of (not shown on the map):

- Zambezian Headwaters
- Upper Zambezi Floodplains
- Zambezi River
- Kafue River
- Middle Zambezi and Luangwa River

== See also ==
- Climate of Zambia
- Geography of Zambia
- Wildlife of Zambia
- List of national parks of Zambia
