= Shang'ombo (constituency) =

Constituency of the National Assembly of Zambia

Shang'ombo was a constituency of the National Assembly of Zambia. It was created in 2016, when Sinjembela was split into two constituencies (Sioma and Shang'ombo). It covered Shangombo District in Western Province, including the town of Shangombo.

== List of MPs ==
| Election year | MP | Party |
Shang'ombo
| 2016 | Mubika Mubika | United Party for National Development |
| 2021 | Mubika Mubika | United Party for National Development |
Seat abolished (split into Shang'ombo North and Shang'ombo South)
