= Luena River (Zambia) =

River in western Zambia

Coordinates: 10°53′S 29°58′E

The Luena River basin

The Luena River of Zambia's Western Province rises just west of the Kafue National Park and flows west through Kaoma to become a tributary of the Zambezi. In the dry season, just below its confluence with its seasonal tributary the Luampa River, it ends in swamps or marshes on the Luena Flats east of Lukulu. In the wet season the Luena Flats flood and overflow into the Ndandu channel or floodplain which leads south-west to the Barotse Floodplain of Zambezi north of Limulunga and Mongu. It is the widest 'tributary' floodplain of the Barotse Floodplain, reaching 20 kilometres (12 mi) wide at its mouth.

In the dry season, vehicle tracks cross the Luena/Ndandu floodplain between north and south, allowing a direct route between Mongu and Lukulu and North-Western Province, Zambia. In the wet season the floodplain is impassable and vehicles have to travel west towards Kaoma, then north-west on the Kaoma-Lukulu road. At the height of the flood this road also becomes impassable across the floodplain, and there is no practical alternative.
