= Kalabo =

Town in Zambia

- City
- Location within Zambia
- Coordinates: 14°59′28″S 22°40′44″E
- Country: Zambia
- Province: Western Province
- District: Kalabo District
- Elevation: 1,019 m (3,343 ft)

Population (2020)
  - Total: 7,731
- Estimate
- Time zone: UTC+2 (CAT)
- Climate: Cwa

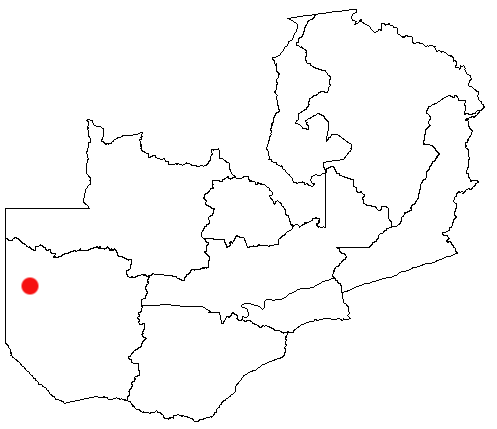
Kalabobo in Zambia location map

Kalabo is an urban centre and the seat of Kalabo District, in the Western Province of Zambia.

== Geography ==
=== Location ===
The town is located on the plains west of the Zambezi River and the Barotse Floodplain, and approximately 58 kilometres (36 mi), by road east of the town of Sikongo, Zambia, close to the border with Angola. This is approximately 660 kilometres (410 mi), by road, west of Lusaka, Zambia's capital and largest city.

The geographical coordinates of Kalabo are:14°59'28.0"S, 22°40'44.0"E (Latitude:-14.991111; Longitude:22.678889). Kalabo sits at an average elevation of 1,019 metres (3,343 ft) above mean sea level.

=== Climate ===
Kalabo has a fairly dry tropical savanna climate (Köppen: Aw), characterized by warm to hot temperatures and distinct wet and dry seasons. June and July are the coolest months, while October is the hottest month with average high temperatures exceeding 35 °C (95 °F). The wet season, from November to March, experiences significant rainfall, while the dry season, from May to October, is marked by a lack of precipitation.

Climate data for Kalabo (1991–2020)
| Month | Jan | Feb | Mar | Apr | May | Jun | Jul | Aug | Sep | Oct | Nov | Dec | Year |
|---|---|---|---|---|---|---|---|---|---|---|---|---|---|
| Record high °C (°F) | 39.5 (103.1) | 37.6 (99.7) | 37.0 (98.6) | 38.4 (101.1) | 35.0 (95.0) | 33.6 (92.5) | 33.4 (92.1) | 37.5 (99.5) | 39.4 (102.9) | 40.3 (104.5) | 39.8 (103.6) | 38.0 (100.4) | 40.3 (104.5) |
| Mean daily maximum °C (°F) | 30.4 (86.7) | 30.6 (87.1) | 30.5 (86.9) | 30.4 (86.7) | 29.3 (84.7) | 27.4 (81.3) | 27.3 (81.1) | 31.0 (87.8) | 33.8 (92.8) | 35.4 (95.7) | 33.1 (91.6) | 31.5 (88.7) | 29.2 (84.6) |
| Daily mean °C (°F) | 24.6 (76.3) | 24.9 (76.8) | 24.9 (76.8) | 24.0 (75.2) | 21.3 (70.3) | 18.7 (65.7) | 18.4 (65.1) | 21.6 (70.9) | 24.6 (76.3) | 26.7 (80.1) | 25.8 (78.4) | 25.2 (77.4) | 23.4 (74.1) |
| Mean daily minimum °C (°F) | 18.8 (65.8) | 19.2 (66.6) | 19.2 (66.6) | 17.6 (63.7) | 13.3 (55.9) | 10.0 (50.0) | 9.5 (49.1) | 12.1 (53.8) | 15.4 (59.7) | 18.0 (64.4) | 18.4 (65.1) | 18.9 (66.0) | 14.7 (58.5) |
| Record low °C (°F) | 15.6 (60.1) | 15.6 (60.1) | 13.1 (55.6) | 7.7 (45.9) | 4.8 (40.6) | 2.0 (35.6) | 2.8 (37.0) | 4.6 (40.3) | 7.6 (45.7) | 11.0 (51.8) | 8.5 (47.3) | 14.5 (58.1) | 2.0 (35.6) |
| Average precipitation mm (inches) | 197.8 (7.79) | 149.9 (5.90) | 141.7 (5.58) | 40.3 (1.59) | 0.6 (0.02) | 0.1 (0.00) | 0.0 (0.0) | 0.0 (0.0) | 0.8 (0.03) | 15.5 (0.61) | 70.6 (2.78) | 140.0 (5.51) | 757.2 (29.81) |
Source: NOAA

== Overview ==
It is situated on the bank of the Luanginga River across which a small pontoon ferry connects to a dirt track going north-west to the Angolan border. Kalabo is the base for the Liuwa Plain National Park which can be reached by off-road vehicles about 20 kilometres (12 mi), north of the pontoon. Zambia's Western Province was formerly known as Barotseland, and Liuwa Plain was the Barotse king's hunting grounds which Lewanika made into a game reserve in the 19th century.

== Population ==
In 2010, the national population census and household survey enumerated the population of Kalabo Town at 2,178 people. In 2020, the town's population was estimated at 7,731 inhabitants.

== Transport ==
Access to Kalabo by road was difficult but now after the completion of the road between Kalabo and Mongu, it is now easier. The section crossing the floodplain is called the Barotse Floodplain Causeway and is counted as an extension of the Lusaka-Mongu Road. The Mongu-Kalabo Road measures 70 kilometres (43 mi) in length. The city of Mongu is the provincial capital of Zambia's Western Province.

Before the construction of the road, Kalabo was usually cut off by road in the rainy season. The dirt tracks across the floodplain from Mongu become flooded, and frequently in poor condition at other times. The tracks go to two ferries across the main channel of the Zambezi, a northern one near Libonda accessed from Mongu via Limulunga, and a southern one at Sandaula accessed via Lealui. In recent years dirt roads on raised earth embankments have been constructed from Mongu to Lealui and from Kalabo to Sandaula. This is part of an ambitious long-term regional plan to provide the first ever major link between the road networks of Zambia and Angola via a paved causeway across the floodplain and a bridge over the Zambezi, replacing the ferry. A paved highway would then be built from Kalabo north-west to the Angolan border and beyond. Although originally intended for completion in 2006, construction has proved more difficult than anticipated and large sections were washed away in floods in 2003/2004, resulting in funding shortfalls.

Kalabo is also served by Kalabo Airport, approximately 4 kilometres (2 mi), west of the town.

== See also ==
- Transport in Zambia
