= Shangombo District =

Coordinates: 16.3214°S 22.1125°E

- District
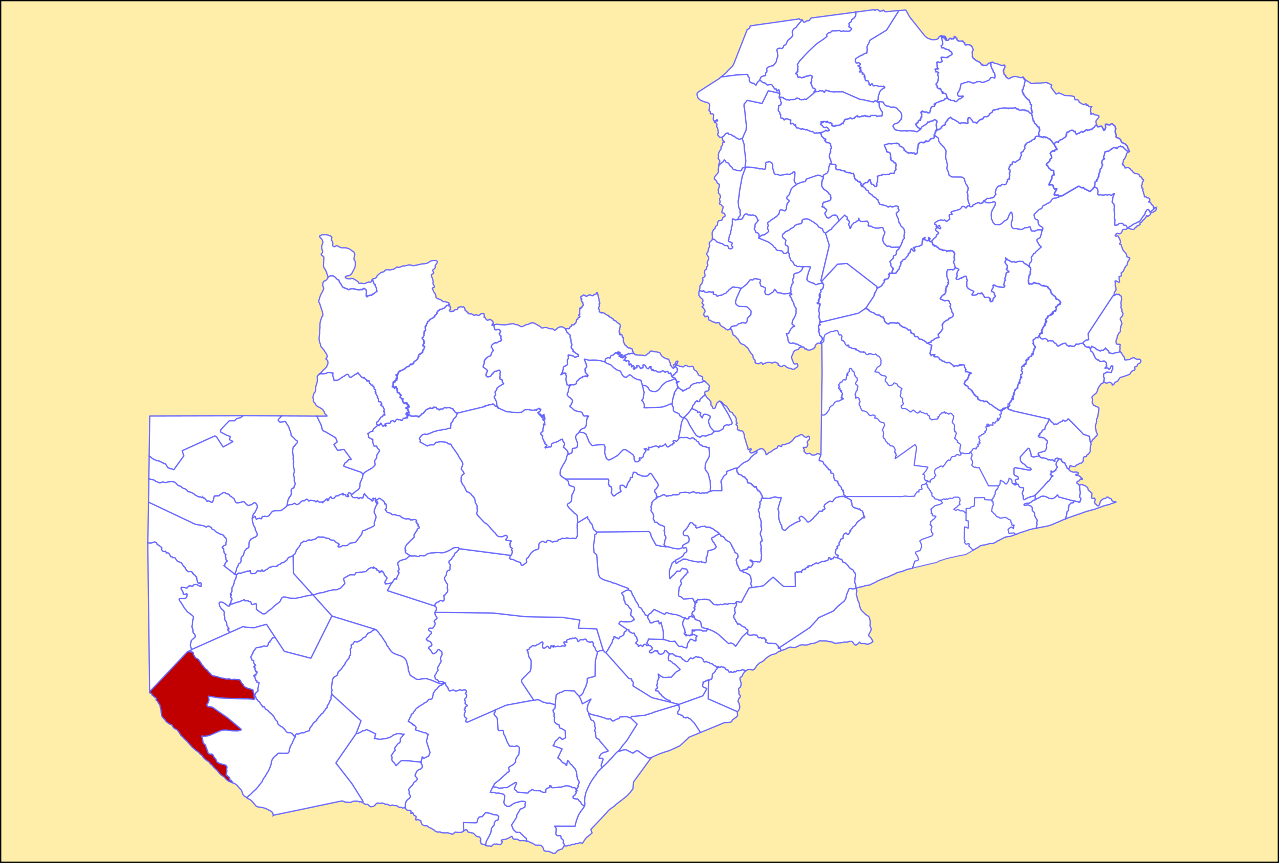
- District location in Zambia
- Country: Zambia
- Province: Western Province
- Capital: Shangombo

Area
  - Total: 7,759.6 km^{2} (2,996.0 sq mi)

Population (2022)
  - Total: 73,822
  - Density: 9.5136/km^{2} (24.640/sq mi)
- Time zone: UTC+2 (CAT)

Shangombo District with headquarters at Shangombo is located in Zambia. As of the 2022 Zambian Census, the district had a population of 73,822 people.

== History ==
During the Angolan Civil War, the area was unsafe due to arms smuggling activities and the conflict occasionally spilled over into Zambia, where villagers were killed by combatants. A large number of Angolan refugees were placed in UNHCR camps in the district, the largest was Nangweshi Camp near the Zambezi established in 2000 for 15,000 refugees; by 2003 the district hosted about 26,000 refugees.

Roads in the district may become impassable in the rainy season and vehicles can get stuck in the sand during the dry season, so trucks and four-wheel drive vehicles are the principal mode of transport. Access to Mongu, the provincial capital relied on the Kalongola Ferry across the Zambezi south of Senanga, and the Senanga-Mongu road, though paved in the past was in very poor condition, partly due to the heavy trucks used to supply UNHCR programs. The Senanga–Katima Mulilo–Sesheke dirt road was also difficult at times. Other tracks go north to Kalabo, along the eastern bank of the Cuando River and to the Sioma Ngwezi National Park located in the south of the district.

In 2003 to help supply the Nangweshi camps from Mongu, Luciano Pavarotti donated through the UNHCR a new ferry at Kalongola from the proceeds of his charity concerts, named Fernando Pavarotti in honour of his father.
