= Barotse Floodplain =

Major floodplain in Central Africa

Coordinates: 15°2′S 22°53′E

Designations

Ramsar Wetland
- Official name: Zambezi Floodplains
- Designated: 2 February 2007
- Reference no.: 1662

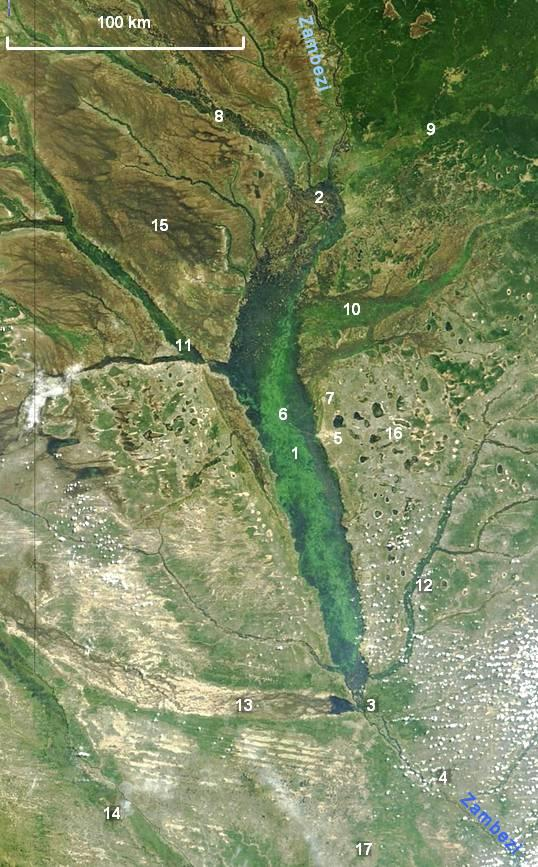
NASA satellite photograph showing the Barotse Floodplain as the bright green to dark blue central region. 1 The Zambezi flowing north to south through the middle of the floodplain; 2 confluence of (left to right) the Lungwebungu, Southern Kashiji, Zambezi and Kabompo Rivers, marking the start of the floodplain; 3 end of the floodplain south of Senanga; 4 Ngonye Falls on the Zambezi; 5 Mongu, capital of Barotseland; 6 Lealui, seat of the Litunga on the floodplain; 7 Limulunga, seat of the Litunga during the flood; 8 swamps and floodplain of the Lungwebungu; 9 the Kabompo drains an area of Cryptosepalum dry forest; 10Luena Flats (floodplain); 11 Luanginga River floodplain near Kalabo; 12 Lui River with narrow floodplain; 13 a broad floodplain which carries overspill from high floods of the Cuando River in Angola; 14 Cuando river and floodplain, on the border between Angola and Zambia; 15Liuwa Plain National Park; 16 The flat sandy Central Zambezian Miombo woodland west of Mongu features many pans; 17 Sioma Ngwezi National Park.

The Barotse Floodplain, also known as the Bulozi Plain, Lyondo, Ngulu, or the Zambezi Floodplain, is one of Africa's great wetlands, on the Zambezi River in the Western Province of Zambia. It is a designated Ramsar site, regarded as being of high conservation value.

The name recognises the floodplain as spawning the culture and way of life of the Lozi people, "Rotse" being a variant of Lozi, and "Ba" meaning "people". They became a powerful kingdom in Central/Southern Africa under their king or litunga Lewanika, whose realm extended up to 300 km from the plain and was called Barotseland.

== Topography and area ==
The region is a flat plateau at an elevation of about 1000 m, tilting very slightly to the south. The Zambezi and its headwaters rise on the higher ground to the north, which enjoys good rainfall (1400 mm annually) in a rainy season from October to May. A flood moves down the river, reaching a flat region formed from Kalahari sands, about five hundred kilometres across. To the south, around the Ngonye Falls, harder rock is found at the surface and has resisted the river's tendency to cut a channel down into it, and so acts a bit like a dam. Behind it, the floodplain has formed. Below the falls, the river flows nearly twice as fast as it does on the plain and flows more swiftly in a narrower valley less prone to flooding.

The floodplain stretches from the Zambezi's confluence with the Kabompo and Lungwebungu Rivers in the north, to a point about 230 km south, above the Ngonye falls and south of Senanga. Along most of its length its width is over 30 km, reaching 50 km at the widest, just north of Mongu, principal town of the plain, situated at its edge. The main body of the plain covers about 5500 km^{2}, but the maximum flooded area is 10 750 km^{2} when the floodplains of several tributaries are taken into account, such as the Luena Flats. The Barotse Floodplain is the second largest wetland in Zambia after the Lake Bangweulu system, which differs in having a large permanent lake and swamps, and a much smaller area which dries out annually.

The satellite photo was taken in April 2004 at the peak of the flood, Note that the northern part of the plain, near Lukulu, is less flooded, the land there varies a bit more in height and the water tends to keep to the many river channels.

== Flood levels and timing ==
See also Climate of Zambia

The peak of the flood occurs on the floodplain about 3 months after the peak of the rainy season in January–February. The flood usually peaks in April, and recedes in May to July, when grasses quickly grow on the exposed plain. At the river's lowest water in November the floodplain still contains about 537 km^{2} of lagoons, swamps and channels. The flood leaves behind a fertile grey to black soil overlaying the Kalahari sands, enriched by silt deposited by the flood as well as humus from vegetation killed by the initial flood, and from decaying aquatic plants left to dry out in the mud. It provides a good soil, but in the late dry season it bakes hard in the heat of the sun.

As the floods recede, water is left behind in lagoons, swamps, and oxbow lakes.

== Natural environment ==
The floodplain is in the Zambezian flooded grasslands ecoregion, and is bordered by slightly higher sandy ground on which grow dry grasslands (Western Zambezian grasslands) with woodland savanna (Zambezian Baikiaea woodlands) to the east and south, and patches of evergreen forest (Cryptosepalum dry forests) in the north and east.

The flood provides aquatic habitats for fish such as tigerfish and bream, crocodiles, hippopotamus, waterbirds, fish-eating birds, and lechwe, the wading antelope. After the flood, the plain is a habitat for grazing animals such as wildebeest, zebra, tsessebe and small antelope such oribi and steenbok, and their predators. These herbivores have been displaced in most areas by the cattle grazed by the Lozi, but they have provided a large game reserve on the dry grassland to the west, the Liuwa Plain National Park, once the Litunga's hunting grounds, established as a game reserve by Lewanika in the 19th century. In addition the entire western of the Zambezi within the country is a Game Management Area.

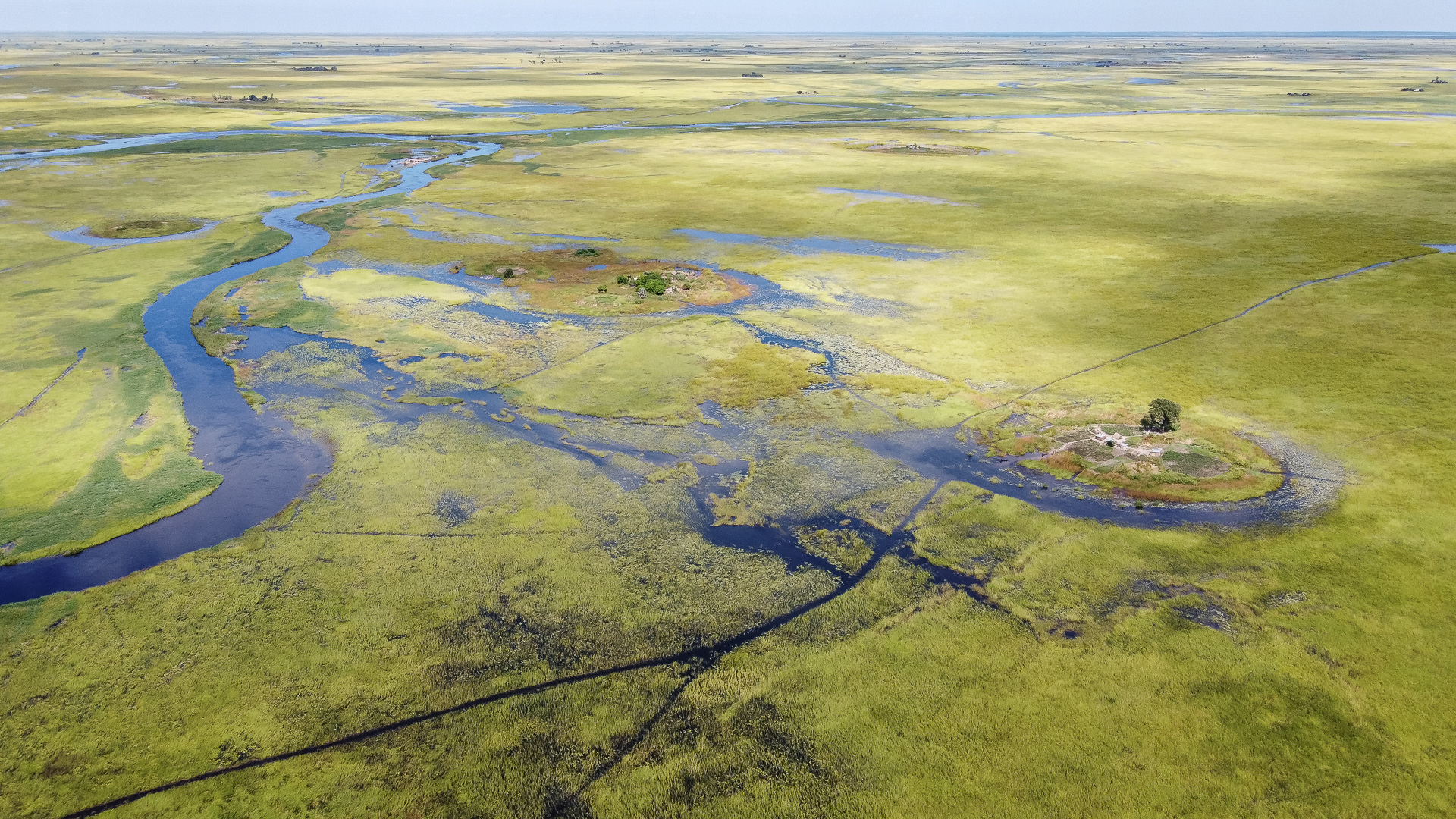
Isolated human settlements on high ground in the Barotse Floodplain, Zambezi River near Mongu city in Western province, Zambia.

== Human ecology of the plain ==
About 250,000 people live on the plain with a similar number of cattle, migrating to grasslands at the edge of the floodplain when the flood arrives. The floodplain is one of the most productive areas for raising cattle in the country.

The Lozi also catch fish, eating about five times as much as the national average. At the height of the flood they use fish traps and spears for fishing, and they use gill nets in the lagoons left behind by the falling flood. Fish spawn just before the flood, the first floodwaters are naturally hypoxic (low in oxygen) which kills most fish, while eggs survive.

The Lozi cultivate crops on the floodplain such as maize, rice, sweet potato, and sugar cane.

November to January are lean months. Stored produce from the previous growing season is almost used up and in any case would need to be transported during the migration, while the new season's crops and grasses are not yet productive, and at the same time fishing stops for the spawning season. Hunting and trapping animals, which might have filled the gap, is no longer available to most people, and trapping waterbirds is one of the few alternatives to buying flour.

The floodplain determines and dominates the way of life, economy, society and culture of the Lozi, who are skilled boat-builders, paddlers and swimmers. The annual migration with the flood is celebrated in the Kuomboka ceremony held at Mongu, capital of Barotseland and its successor, the Western Province.

In the occasional very wet year such as 2005, lives and property are lost in floods on the Barotse Plain. More often, however, it is a very good example of the principle that natural annual flooding by rivers is valuable and productive for wildlife and human populations, while damming rivers to control floods, as has happened with the Kafue Flats, is potentially damaging to the environment.

=== Development ===
Development on the plain has been restricted until now to—

- the canal dug in colonial times to connect a small harbour at Mongu to the Zambezi's channel in the dry season
- small villages and compounds constructed on mounds, such as Lealui
- a few dry season tracks
- pontoon ferries at Sandaula, Libonda and Lukulu
- some intensive rice and sugarcane plantations.

Tight control over access to the floodplain by the Litunga and the homogeneity of the indigenous people have slowed commercial development by outsiders.

==== Barotse Floodplain causeway ====
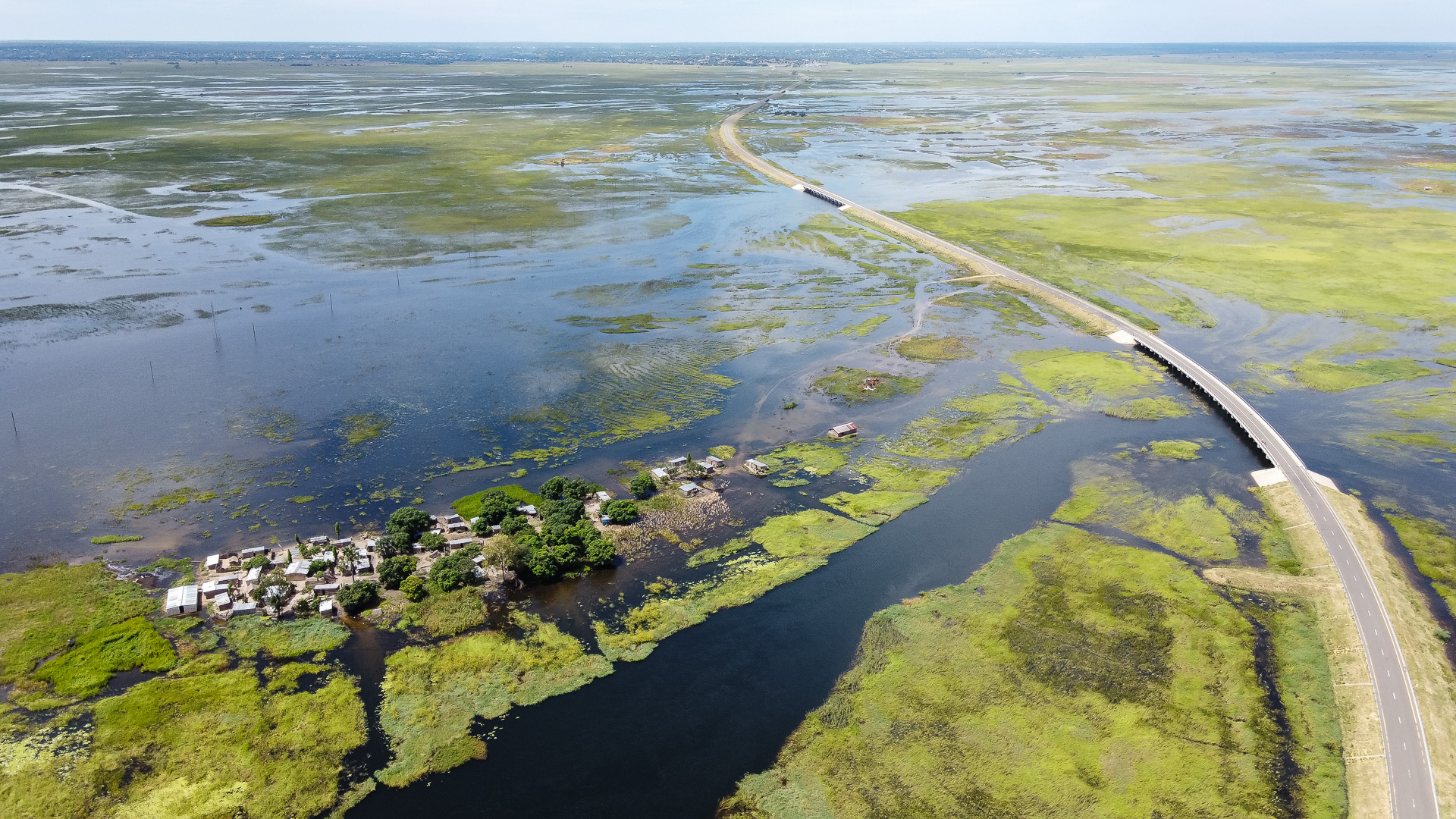
Bridge through the Barotse Floodplain at Mongu city, western province, Zambia.

A new project, the Mongu-Kalabo road, will have more far-reaching consequences. Around 2002 construction started of a 46-kilometre causeway across the centre of the floodplain to take a paved highway from Mongu to Kalabo, via the ferry across the main river channel at Sandaula, which would then be replaced by a 500-metre bridge. It is treated as an extension of the Lusaka-Mongu Road from Lusaka. Originally intended to be completed in 2006, it has been delayed by the difficulty of building on the floodplain. There is no rock in the region, and the causeway has been built from sand and gravel scooped out from shallow depressions next to it. Higher than usual floods washed away large sections. The contractor was a Kuwait-based company which acknowledged that conditions were difficult. The Times of Zambia reported that the company underestimated the floodplain environment, and abandoned the contract. Subsequent modifications have been made to raise the road height and to increase the number and size of culverts, and this in turn led to funding problems. The road has been completed in 2016. A Chinese contractor, the Aviation Industry Corporation of China (AVIC International), finished the 286.9 million US dollars project. The road stretches 34 Kilometres in the Baroste plains with 26 bridges across it.

== See also ==
- List of crossings of the Zambezi River
