= Shang'ombo North =

National Assembly constituency in Zambia

Shang'ombo North is a constituency of the National Assembly of Zambia. It was created in 2026 when Shang'ombo constituency was split into two constituencies (Shang'ombo North and Shang'ombo South). It covers the northern part of Shangombo District.

== List of MPs ==
Election year	MP	Party
2026	Beauty Moola	United Party for National Development
