= Shang'ombo South =

National Assembly constituency in Zambia

Shang'ombo South is a constituency of the National Assembly of Zambia. It was created in 2026 when Shang'ombo constituency was split into two constituencies (Shang'ombo North and Shang'ombo South). It covers the southern part of Shangombo District.

== List of MPs ==
Election year	MP	Party
Shang'ombo South
2026	Mubika Mubika	United Party for National Development
