= Lungwebungu River =

Stream in Angola, Africa

Coordinates: 13°25′S 22°00′E

Lungwebungu River catchment

The Lungwebungu River (in Angola Lungué Bungo) of Central Africa is the largest tributary of the upper Zambezi River. The headwaters of the Lungwebungu are in central Angola at an elevation around 1,400 metres (4,600 ft), and it flows south-east across the southern African plateau. Within 50 kilometres (31 mi) it has developed the character which it keeps for most of its course, of extremely intricate meanders, with multiple channels and oxbow lakes, in a swampy channel about 800 m (2,600 ft) wide which in turn is in a shallow valley with a floodplain 3 to 5 km (1.9 to 3.1 mi) wide, inundated in the wet season.

The edges of the floodplain are a white sandy soil covered in thin forest. The main river channel grows from 50 m (160 ft) wide to 200 m (660 ft) wide near the Zambezi, and its floodplain suddenly broadens as it merges with the Zambezi, at the beginning of the Barotse Floodplain, which is 25 km (16 mi) wide at that point.

A 2021 study found the river is home to a subspecies of Hippopotamyrus that is distinct from other lineages of the fish.

While the river is a valuable resource to people living near it as a source of fish, its meanders make it unsuitable for water transport except in the wet season when canoes and small boats can navigate the floodwaters.
