= Limulunga District =

Coordinates: 15°00′S 22°30′E

- District
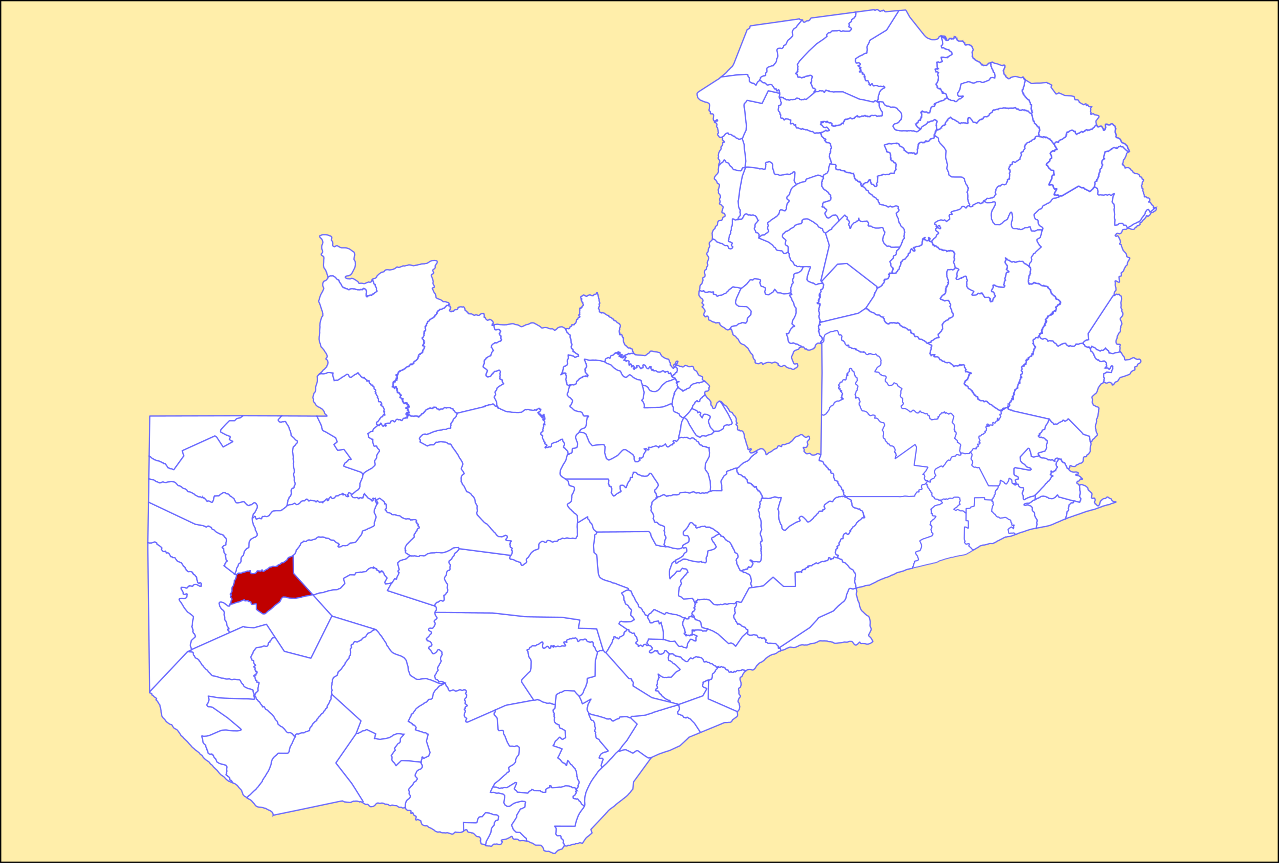
- District location in Zambia
- Country: Zambia
- Province: Western Province
- Capital: Limulunga

Area
  - Total: 3,890.5 km^{2} (1,502.1 sq mi)

Population (2022)
  - Total: 61,102
  - Density: 15.705/km^{2} (40.677/sq mi)
- Time zone: UTC+2 (CAT)

Limulunga District is a district of Zambia, located in Western Province. The seat of the district is Limulunga. It was made independent from Mongu District in 2012 (14 years ago). As of the 2022 Zambian Census, the district had a population of 61,102 people.
