= Kalabo Airport =

Airport in Zambia

- IATA: KLB; ICAO: FLKL

Summary
- Airport type: Public
- Serves: Kalabo, Zambia
- Elevation AMSL: 3,451 ft / 1,052 m
- Coordinates: 14°59′55″S 22°38′50″E

Map
- Location of the airport in Zambia

Runways
Direction	Length		Surface
Direction	m	ft	Surface
10/28	1,100	3,609	Asphalt

Kalabo Airport (IATA: KLB, ICAO: FLKL) is an airport serving the town of Kalabo, in Kalabo District and surrounding communities in the Western Province of Zambia.

== Location ==
The airport is 4 kilometres (2 mi) west of the town. This is approximately 603.5 kilometres (375 mi), by air, north-west of Lusaka International Airport, the largest civilian airport in the county. The geographical coordinates of Kalabo Airport are: 14°59'55.0"S, 22°38'50.0"E (Latitude:-14.998611; Longitude:22.647222). The airport sits at an average elevation of 1,052 metres (3,451 ft) above mean sea level.

== Overview ==
Kalabo Airport as a single paved runway 10/28 that measures 1,100 metres (3,609 ft) in length.

== See also ==
- Transport in Zambia
- List of airports in Zambia
