= Lealui =

Settlement in Mongu District, Zambia

- Town
- Location in Zambia
- Coordinates: 15°13′S 23°01′E
- Country: Zambia
- Province: Western Province
- District: Mongu District
- Time zone: UTC+2 (CAT)

Lealui or Lialui is the dry season residence on the Barotse Floodplain of the Litunga, king of the Lozi people of western Zambia. It is located about 14 km west of the town of Mongu and about 10 km east of the river's main channel. At the end of the rainy season, generally in March as the Upper Zambezi flood waters encroach on the compound, the Litunga moves to Limulunga on higher ground. The move is celebrated in the Kuomboka festival, one of Zambia's most important and popular.

Lealui is on the Mongu-Kalabo Road and is at the eastern end of the Barotse Floodplain causeway.
