= Climate of Zambia =

Emissions, impacts and responses of Zambia related to climate change

Zambia map of Köppen climate classification.

The climate of Zambia in Central and Southern Africa is definitely tropical modified by altitude (elevation). In the Köppen climate classification, most of the country is classified as humid subtropical or tropical wet and dry, with small patches of semi-arid steppe climate in the south-west.

Climate and specifically rainfall amount is the chief determinant of type and distribution of the ecoregions of Zambia. So technically, Zambia is a very arid country with a humid and subtropical year with small patches of semi arid steppe.

== Seasons ==
There are two main seasons: the rainy season (November to April, starting a little earlier and ending a little later in the north) corresponding to summer, and the dry season (May to October/November), corresponding to winter. The dry season is subdivided into the cool dry season (May to August), and the hot dry season (September to October/November). The modifying influence of altitude gives the country pleasant subtropical weather rather than tropical conditions for most of the year.

=== Rainy season ===
Rainfall varies over a range of 500 to 1,400 mm (19.7 to 55.1 in) per year (most areas fall into the range of 700 to 1,200 mm or 27.6 to 47.2 in). The distinction between rainy and dry seasons is marked with no rain at all falling in June, July and August. Much of the economic, cultural and social life of the country is dominated by the onset and end of the rainy season, and the amount of rain it brings. Failure of the rains causes hunger in most cases. The average temperature in Zambia in the summer season is 30 °C and in the winter (colder season) it can get as low as 5 °C. The rains are brought by the Intertropical Convergence Zone (ITCZ) and are characterised by thunderstorms, occasionally severe, with much lightning and sometimes hail. The ITCZ is located north of Zambia in the dry season. It moves southwards in the second half of the year, and northwards in the first half of the year, and this explains the earlier onset and later cessation of the rains in the north. In some years, it moves south of Zambia, leading to a "little dry season" in the north of the country for three or four weeks in December.

The highest rainfall is in the north, especially the north-west and the north-east, decreasing towards the south; the driest areas are in the far south west and the Luangwa River and middle Zambezi River valleys, parts of which are considered semi-arid. None of the country is considered arid or to be desert.

Flooding is an annual event on floodplains, to which people and wildlife are adapted. Flash floods after unusually heavy rain cause damage when they occur in places that do not experience annual floods. Erosion and the washing out of roads and bridges are common. Crops are frequently damaged by flooding and hail. Too much rain when the maize crop is flowering or late in the season when it should be drying off prior to harvest, can be very damaging and promotes rotting of stored grain.

=== Dry season ===
==== Plant and animal adaptations ====
Deciduous trees which lose leaves in the dry season to conserve water predominate over evergreens which have waxy leaf cuticles for the same purpose. The deciduous trees usually produce fresh green or reddish leaves just before the rainy season. Grasses and some other herbaceous plants dry up above ground but regenerate quickly with the onset of rains from roots and tubers, etc.

Except for those living in areas of permanent freshwater, animals are adapted to the long dry season, as seen in migration and breeding patterns.

==== Bushfires ====
In the middle to late dry season, bushfires are prevalent, and smoke is noticeable by smell and as a haze. The fires are ignited by villagers hunting, burning crop residue, and preparing chitemene gardens; or by lightning in the early rainy season. Because such fires happen annually, there is no great buildup of dry fuel in the bush, and so the fires are not usually devastating. They may kill animals, and damage crops if the rains end early and fires happen before harvest. The presence of fire-adapted plants and palaeoecological studies indicate that such fires have happened for millennia.

==== Water sources in the dry season ====
Most rivers, lakes and swamps, except in the far south and south-west, are permanent. In addition, dambos (grasslands which become marshy in the rainy season) are prevalent in most of the country and water is usually available in them from springs or shallow wells. Dambos also release groundwater to streams and rivers towards the end of the dry season, keeping them flowing permanently. Small earth dams are often constructed in dambos as a source of water and as fishponds.

For the human population, the location of rural settlements is determined by access to water in the dry season (though boreholes are now commonly used to augment supplies). Traditionally, people have also migrated in the drier areas where rivers dambos are not prevalent. In Barotseland, people move with their livestock, grazing them on the Barotse Floodplain in the dry season and moving to higher ground at the margins during the rainy season.

The ability to grow enough food in the rainy season to last the long dry season is also a factor in population distribution. Traditionally some communities have divided the year into farming in the rainy season, and fishing and hunting in the dry season, when herbivores can be found more easily as they visit sources of water, and fires can be set to expose them or drive them into traps.

== Greenhouse gas emissions ==
Zambia's greenhouse gas emissions in 2024 totaled to about 90.34 megatonnes of CO2-equivalents, or 0.1638% of all emissions. The country has had decreasing emissions over the last ten years, with an annual percent change of -0.37%. This decline is due in part to the fact that more investment has gone into renewable forms of energy, including solar energy, since 2019. Transitioning to renewable energy has declined the use of fossil fuels, and this has been the cause of overall emission decline.

Zambia Total Greenhouse Gas Emissions including Land-use Change and Forestry reported was 88.251 Tonne mn in 2023. This decreased from the last figure of 88.297 Tonne mn in 2022. Zambia Total Greenhouse Gas Emissions including Land-use Change and Forestry is updated annually, averaging 30.270 Tonne mn from Dec 1850 up to 2023, and stands at 174 observations. The values were a record 106.005 Tonne mn in 2011 and a record low of 8.978 Tonne mn in 1850. Zambia Total Greenhouse Gas Emissions including Land-use Change and Forestry statistics are updated annually and released by Our World in Data.

Fossil Carbon Dioxide (CO2) emissions of Zambia
Year	Fossil CO2 emissions (tons)	CO2 emissions change	CO2 emissions per capita	Population	Pop. change	Share of World's CO2 emissions
2022	9,270,700	4.56%	0.46	20,152,938	2.8%	0.024%
2021	8,866,400	7.65%	0.45	19,603,607	2.86%	0.023%
2020	8,236,330	−0.1%	0.43	19,059,395	2.95%	0.023%
2019	8,244,490	−2.26%	0.45	18,513,839	3.01%	0.022%
2018	8,434,700	14.93%	0.47	17,973,569	3.05%	0.022%
2017	7,338,790	25.38%	0.42	17,441,320	3.12%	0.020%
2016	5,853,190	9.29%	0.35	16,914,423	3.14%	0.016%
2015	5,355,500	6.35%	0.33	16,399,089	3.17%	0.015%
2014	5,035,540	9.42%	0.32	15,895,315	3.22%	0.014%
2013	4,601,880	5.78%	0.3	15,398,997	3.25%	0.013%
2012	4,350,310	32.33%	0.29	14,913,629	3.3%	0.012%
2011	3,287,400	12.53%	0.23	14,437,796	3.38%	0.0094%
2010	2,921,300	10.27%	0.21	13,965,594	3.52%	0.0086%
2009	2,649,240	12.2%	0.2	13,490,389	3.6%	0.0083%
2008	2,361,140	6.9%	0.18	13,021,324	3.63%	0.0073%
2007	2,208,670	−8.19%	0.18	12,565,085	3.59%	0.0069%
2006	2,405,660	−2.62%	0.2	12,129,553	3.5%	0.0078%
2005	2,470,400	7.39%	0.21	11,718,819	3.36%	0.0083%
2004	2,300,450	2.8%	0.2	11,338,198	3.23%	0.0080%
2003	2,237,810	8.32%	0.2	10,983,595	3.15%	0.0081%
2002	2,065,870	5.12%	0.19	10,647,949	3.13%	0.0078%
2001	1,965,250	0.78%	0.19	10,325,185	3.07%	0.0076%
2000	1,950,110	1.2%	0.19	10,017,631	2.85%	0.0076%
1999	1,927,020	−17.73%	0.2	9,740,005	2.72%	0.0078%
1998	2,342,300	−6.25%	0.25	9,482,408	2.66%	0.0095%
1997	2,498,460	26.01%	0.27	9,237,063	2.59%	0.010%
1996	1,982,680	−15.86%	0.22	9,004,053	2.48%	0.0083%
1995	2,356,470	−1.28%	0.27	8,785,763	2.44%	0.010%
1994	2,387,090	−16.11%	0.28	8,576,269	2.42%	0.010%
1993	2,845,370	−9.32%	0.34	8,373,921	2.41%	0.013%
1992	3,137,800	0.05%	0.38	8,176,680	2.44%	0.014%
1991	3,136,220	3.55%	0.39	7,981,650	2.51%	0.014%
1990	3,028,700	−17.06%	0.39	7,786,169	2.6%	0.013%
1989	3,651,610	3.47%	0.48	7,589,216	2.68%	0.016%
1988	3,529,270	8.51%	0.48	7,391,440	2.78%	0.016%
1987	3,252,430	−1.03%	0.45	7,191,282	2.93%	0.015%
1986	3,286,230	2.98%	0.47	6,986,471	3.03%	0.016%
1985	3,191,250	0.14%	0.47	6,780,953	3.05%	0.016%
1984	3,186,690	−1.83%	0.48	6,580,490	3.13%	0.016%
1983	3,246,120	−2.76%	0.51	6,381,038	3.28%	0.017%
1982	3,338,110	−3.15%	0.54	6,178,637	3.26%	0.017%
1981	3,446,840	−8.01%	0.58	5,983,289	3.11%	0.018%
1980	3,746,960	−0.13%	0.65	5,802,833	3.04%	0.019%
1979	3,751,750	−9.1%	0.67	5,631,728	3.04%	0.019%
1978	4,127,230	−4.82%	0.76	5,465,374	3.07%	0.021%
1977	4,336,310	−9.34%	0.82	5,302,480	3.08%	0.023%

== Temperature ==
The elevation of the great plateau on which Zambia is located, typically between 1,000 and 1,300 metres (3,281 and 4,265 ft), modifies temperatures, which are lower than for coastal areas at the same latitude, and pleasant for much of the year. On the plateau (covering about 80% of the country) temperature ranges, depending on location are:

Months	Season	Mean Daily Maximum °C (°F)	Mean Daily Minimum °C (°F)
May–August	Cool and Dry	21-26 (70-79)	6-12 (43-54)
September–October	Hot and Dry	28-35 (82-95)	17-22 (63-72)
November–April	Rainy	25-30 (77-86)	14-19 (57-66)

Most of the country is frost-free but in some years ground frost occurs. This is restricted to the highest exposed hills, or more widely in the lower humidity areas of the southernmost parts of the country.

Temperatures are higher at lower elevations, such as the Luapula-Mweru and Mweru Wantipa/Tanganyika valleys in the north, and highest in the lower Luangwa and Zambezi valleys in the south, typically experiencing 40 °C (104 °F) in October, with rising humidity making for uncomfortable conditions.

During the rainy season months of November to April or May some days may be humid, but daily maximum temperatures are usually a little lower than in the hot dry season. The rain can be cooling, unlike in the humid tropics.

=== Examples ===
Climate data for Lusaka (1961-1990 normals)
Month	Jan	Feb	Mar	Apr	May	Jun	Jul	Aug	Sep	Oct	Nov	Dec	Year
Record high °C (°F)	39.6 (103.3)	36.4 (97.5)	33.6 (92.5)	33.0 (91.4)	32.0 (89.6)	29.9 (85.8)	29.7 (85.5)	33.5 (92.3)	38.5 (101.3)	37.2 (99.0)	38.6 (101.5)	33.9 (93.0)	39.6 (103.3)
Mean daily maximum °C (°F)	27.4 (81.3)	27.4 (81.3)	27.5 (81.5)	27.1 (80.8)	25.8 (78.4)	23.8 (74.8)	24.0 (75.2)	26.5 (79.7)	30.3 (86.5)	31.7 (89.1)	30.4 (86.7)	27.7 (81.9)	27.5 (81.5)
Daily mean °C (°F)	21.5 (70.7)	21.5 (70.7)	21.1 (70.0)	19.9 (67.8)	17.4 (63.3)	15.2 (59.4)	14.9 (58.8)	17.3 (63.1)	21.3 (70.3)	23.5 (74.3)	23.4 (74.1)	21.7 (71.1)	19.9 (67.8)
Mean daily minimum °C (°F)	17.6 (63.7)	17.4 (63.3)	16.4 (61.5)	14.0 (57.2)	10.7 (51.3)	7.8 (46.0)	7.2 (45.0)	9.2 (48.6)	12.9 (55.2)	16.2 (61.2)	17.4 (63.3)	17.8 (64.0)	13.7 (56.7)
Record low °C (°F)	13.0 (55.4)	12.9 (55.2)	10.0 (50.0)	8.0 (46.4)	5.4 (41.7)	0.2 (32.4)	0.7 (33.3)	2.8 (37.0)	5.8 (42.4)	9.0 (48.2)	10.8 (51.4)	10.4 (50.7)	0.2 (32.4)
Average precipitation mm (inches)	245.4 (9.66)	185.9 (7.32)	95.0 (3.74)	34.7 (1.37)	3.1 (0.12)	0.0 (0.0)	0.1 (0.00)	0.4 (0.02)	1.7 (0.07)	18.4 (0.72)	89.3 (3.52)	208.1 (8.19)	882.1 (34.73)
Average precipitation days (≥ 1.0 mm)	18	15	10	3	0	0	0	0	0	2	8	16	72
Average relative humidity (%)	82.3	82.5	80.7	75.8	69.3	65.2	61.1	53.6	46.3	48.6	60.2	78.6	67.0
Mean monthly sunshine hours	176.7	168.0	220.1	246.0	275.9	270.0	294.5	303.8	291.0	272.8	234.0	182.9	2,935.7
Source: NOAA

Climate data for Ndola (1961-1990 normals)
Month	Jan	Feb	Mar	Apr	May	Jun	Jul	Aug	Sep	Oct	Nov	Dec	Year
Record high °C (°F)	31.7 (89.1)	33.1 (91.6)	32.0 (89.6)	32.4 (90.3)	32.0 (89.6)	30.2 (86.4)	30.5 (86.9)	33.5 (92.3)	35.5 (95.9)	36.1 (97.0)	38.5 (101.3)	32.6 (90.7)	38.5 (101.3)
Mean daily maximum °C (°F)	26.6 (79.9)	26.9 (80.4)	27.4 (81.3)	27.5 (81.5)	26.6 (79.9)	25.1 (77.2)	25.2 (77.4)	27.5 (81.5)	30.5 (86.9)	31.5 (88.7)	29.4 (84.9)	27.0 (80.6)	27.6 (81.7)
Daily mean °C (°F)	20.8 (69.4)	20.8 (69.4)	21.0 (69.8)	20.5 (68.9)	18.6 (65.5)	16.5 (61.7)	16.7 (62.1)	19.2 (66.6)	22.5 (72.5)	23.7 (74.7)	22.5 (72.5)	21.0 (69.8)	20.3 (68.5)
Mean daily minimum °C (°F)	17.1 (62.8)	17.1 (62.8)	16.5 (61.7)	14.4 (57.9)	10.8 (51.4)	7.9 (46.2)	7.8 (46.0)	10.2 (50.4)	13.6 (56.5)	16.2 (61.2)	17.1 (62.8)	17.2 (63.0)	13.8 (56.8)
Record low °C (°F)	12.4 (54.3)	12.4 (54.3)	7.5 (45.5)	7.2 (45.0)	3.8 (38.8)	1.7 (35.1)	0.7 (33.3)	1.6 (34.9)	6.7 (44.1)	9.8 (49.6)	11.7 (53.1)	11.2 (52.2)	0.7 (33.3)
Average precipitation mm (inches)	292.9 (11.53)	249.0 (9.80)	170.1 (6.70)	45.5 (1.79)	3.5 (0.14)	0.7 (0.03)	0.1 (0.00)	0.4 (0.02)	2.9 (0.11)	31.5 (1.24)	130.3 (5.13)	305.9 (12.04)	1,232.8 (48.54)
Average precipitation days (≥ 1.0 mm)	23	20	17	6	1	0	0	0	0	4	14	23	108
Average relative humidity (%)	82.5	83.0	79.7	73.4	65.9	61.1	54.6	46.6	40.9	47.3	64.9	80.4	65.0
Mean monthly sunshine hours	151.9	142.8	192.2	243.0	279.0	276.0	297.6	297.6	279.0	269.7	207.0	158.1	2,793.9
Source: NOAA

Climate data for Livingstone, Zambia (1961-1990 normals, extremes 1918–present)
Month	Jan	Feb	Mar	Apr	May	Jun	Jul	Aug	Sep	Oct	Nov	Dec	Year
Record high °C (°F)	39.8 (103.6)	38.0 (100.4)	43.6 (110.5)	37.0 (98.6)	36.0 (96.8)	32.4 (90.3)	32.5 (90.5)	36.0 (96.8)	38.8 (101.8)	40.9 (105.6)	41.1 (106.0)	39.5 (103.1)	43.6 (110.5)
Mean daily maximum °C (°F)	30.0 (86.0)	29.7 (85.5)	30.3 (86.5)	29.9 (85.8)	28.0 (82.4)	25.6 (78.1)	25.5 (77.9)	28.4 (83.1)	32.5 (90.5)	34.0 (93.2)	32.6 (90.7)	30.4 (86.7)	29.7 (85.5)
Daily mean °C (°F)	23.6 (74.5)	23.2 (73.8)	23.1 (73.6)	21.9 (71.4)	18.9 (66.0)	16.0 (60.8)	16.1 (61.0)	19.3 (66.7)	23.9 (75.0)	26.2 (79.2)	25.1 (77.2)	23.6 (74.5)	21.7 (71.1)
Mean daily minimum °C (°F)	18.9 (66.0)	18.6 (65.5)	17.6 (63.7)	14.8 (58.6)	10.1 (50.2)	6.7 (44.1)	6.3 (43.3)	9.2 (48.6)	14.2 (57.6)	18.2 (64.8)	19.1 (66.4)	18.9 (66.0)	14.4 (57.9)
Record low °C (°F)	10.5 (50.9)	11.9 (53.4)	10.9 (51.6)	4.3 (39.7)	1.0 (33.8)	−3.7 (25.3)	−3.0 (26.6)	−1.7 (28.9)	1.0 (33.8)	8.1 (46.6)	12.2 (54.0)	10.8 (51.4)	−3.7 (25.3)
Average precipitation mm (inches)	173.7 (6.84)	141.1 (5.56)	79.5 (3.13)	24.0 (0.94)	6.0 (0.24)	0.6 (0.02)	0.2 (0.01)	0.5 (0.02)	1.8 (0.07)	24.8 (0.98)	70.4 (2.77)	169.1 (6.66)	691.7 (27.23)
Average precipitation days (≥ 1.0 mm)	16	14	9	3	0	0	0	0	0	4	11	16	73
Average relative humidity (%)	74.8	77.3	72.2	65.1	57.7	55.0	51.8	43.3	35.1	41.7	55.2	71.0	58.4
Mean monthly sunshine hours	213.9	196.0	251.1	273.0	303.8	288.0	310.0	319.3	297.0	279.0	228.0	207.7	3,166.8
Source 1: NOAA
Source 2: Meteo Climat (record highs and lows)

Climate data for Mongu (1961-1990 normals)
Month	Jan	Feb	Mar	Apr	May	Jun	Jul	Aug	Sep	Oct	Nov	Dec	Year
Record high °C (°F)	35.2 (95.4)	35.6 (96.1)	38.2 (100.8)	39.0 (102.2)	33.4 (92.1)	31.6 (88.9)	32.5 (90.5)	35.3 (95.5)	38.2 (100.8)	38.4 (101.1)	36.7 (98.1)	36.7 (98.1)	39.0 (102.2)
Mean daily maximum °C (°F)	28.9 (84.0)	28.6 (83.5)	29.1 (84.4)	29.6 (85.3)	28.4 (83.1)	26.5 (79.7)	27.0 (80.6)	29.8 (85.6)	33.4 (92.1)	33.8 (92.8)	31.3 (88.3)	29.3 (84.7)	29.6 (85.3)
Daily mean °C (°F)	22.8 (73.0)	22.8 (73.0)	22.8 (73.0)	22.3 (72.1)	19.9 (67.8)	17.3 (63.1)	17.8 (64.0)	20.7 (69.3)	24.6 (76.3)	25.4 (77.7)	23.7 (74.7)	22.9 (73.2)	21.9 (71.4)
Mean daily minimum °C (°F)	18.6 (65.5)	18.7 (65.7)	18.4 (65.1)	16.5 (61.7)	12.7 (54.9)	9.5 (49.1)	9.7 (49.5)	12.4 (54.3)	16.4 (61.5)	18.1 (64.6)	18.2 (64.8)	18.6 (65.5)	15.7 (60.3)
Record low °C (°F)	12.9 (55.2)	11.5 (52.7)	13.7 (56.7)	7.5 (45.5)	2.7 (36.9)	−1.6 (29.1)	0.3 (32.5)	−1.6 (29.1)	8.2 (46.8)	9.2 (48.6)	11.1 (52.0)	13.8 (56.8)	−1.6 (29.1)
Average precipitation mm (inches)	209.1 (8.23)	184.6 (7.27)	139.9 (5.51)	43.4 (1.71)	4.9 (0.19)	0.7 (0.03)	0.0 (0.0)	1.5 (0.06)	2.2 (0.09)	32.7 (1.29)	106.4 (4.19)	192.8 (7.59)	918.2 (36.15)
Average precipitation days (≥ 1.0 mm)	19	16	14	4	0	0	0	0	0	5	13	19	90
Average relative humidity (%)	78.9	80.0	77.6	68.3	58.9	53.6	47.3	39.7	34.2	48.5	64.2	76.8	60.7
Mean monthly sunshine hours	198.4	179.2	226.3	267.0	306.9	297.0	313.1	313.1	288.0	266.6	216.0	195.3	3,066.9
Source: NOAA

Climate data for Kabwe (1961-1990 normals)
Month	Jan	Feb	Mar	Apr	May	Jun	Jul	Aug	Sep	Oct	Nov	Dec	Year
Record high °C (°F)	32.4 (90.3)	31.5 (88.7)	32.6 (90.7)	33.0 (91.4)	31.5 (88.7)	30.4 (86.7)	29.6 (85.3)	33.4 (92.1)	36.3 (97.3)	38.6 (101.5)	37.5 (99.5)	34.1 (93.4)	38.6 (101.5)
Mean daily maximum °C (°F)	27.0 (80.6)	27.0 (80.6)	27.0 (80.6)	26.5 (79.7)	25.2 (77.4)	23.7 (74.7)	23.5 (74.3)	26.1 (79.0)	29.8 (85.6)	31.3 (88.3)	29.8 (85.6)	27.3 (81.1)	27.0 (80.6)
Daily mean °C (°F)	21.1 (70.0)	21.0 (69.8)	20.7 (69.3)	20.0 (68.0)	17.8 (64.0)	15.9 (60.6)	15.9 (60.6)	18.4 (65.1)	22.1 (71.8)	24.1 (75.4)	23.0 (73.4)	21.3 (70.3)	20.1 (68.2)
Mean daily minimum °C (°F)	17.3 (63.1)	17.4 (63.3)	16.5 (61.7)	14.4 (57.9)	11.4 (52.5)	13.1 (55.6)	8.7 (47.7)	10.9 (51.6)	14.5 (58.1)	17.1 (62.8)	17.6 (63.7)	17.5 (63.5)	14.7 (58.5)
Record low °C (°F)	10.1 (50.2)	11.9 (53.4)	11.3 (52.3)	8.2 (46.8)	5.9 (42.6)	3.0 (37.4)	3.4 (38.1)	3.6 (38.5)	4.4 (39.9)	8.9 (48.0)	12.6 (54.7)	9.4 (48.9)	3.0 (37.4)
Average precipitation mm (inches)	234.4 (9.23)	179.4 (7.06)	100.6 (3.96)	27.5 (1.08)	4.4 (0.17)	0.1 (0.00)	0.0 (0.0)	0.1 (0.00)	0.7 (0.03)	18.1 (0.71)	91.2 (3.59)	251.2 (9.89)	907.8 (35.74)
Average precipitation days (≥ 1.0 mm)	20	16	11	3	0	0	0	0	0	2	10	19	81
Average relative humidity (%)	81.3	81.3	78.6	72.6	64.8	60.2	56.4	48.1	40.7	44.0	60.9	78.0	63.9
Mean monthly sunshine hours	179.8	165.2	220.1	258.0	282.1	279.0	300.7	316.2	297.0	285.2	222.0	173.6	2,978.9
Source: NOAA

Climate data for Kasama (1961-1990 normals)
Month	Jan	Feb	Mar	Apr	May	Jun	Jul	Aug	Sep	Oct	Nov	Dec	Year
Record high °C (°F)	30.5 (86.9)	31.2 (88.2)	31.5 (88.7)	31.2 (88.2)	31.3 (88.3)	30.6 (87.1)	30.0 (86.0)	32.4 (90.3)	36.5 (97.7)	35.6 (96.1)	34.8 (94.6)	32.0 (89.6)	36.5 (97.7)
Mean daily maximum °C (°F)	26.3 (79.3)	26.8 (80.2)	26.8 (80.2)	26.5 (79.7)	26.0 (78.8)	24.9 (76.8)	24.9 (76.8)	26.9 (80.4)	29.8 (85.6)	30.9 (87.6)	28.9 (84.0)	26.7 (80.1)	27.1 (80.8)
Daily mean °C (°F)	19.7 (67.5)	19.9 (67.8)	20.2 (68.4)	20.2 (68.4)	18.9 (66.0)	17.2 (63.0)	17.1 (62.8)	18.9 (66.0)	21.8 (71.2)	23.1 (73.6)	21.6 (70.9)	20.1 (68.2)	19.9 (67.8)
Mean daily minimum °C (°F)	16.1 (61.0)	16.2 (61.2)	16.1 (61.0)	15.2 (59.4)	12.5 (54.5)	9.6 (49.3)	9.3 (48.7)	11.0 (51.8)	13.8 (56.8)	15.9 (60.6)	16.4 (61.5)	16.2 (61.2)	14.0 (57.2)
Record low °C (°F)	8.2 (46.8)	13.3 (55.9)	12.2 (54.0)	9.8 (49.6)	2.4 (36.3)	1.0 (33.8)	2.5 (36.5)	4.7 (40.5)	8.5 (47.3)	11.4 (52.5)	12.6 (54.7)	10.9 (51.6)	1.0 (33.8)
Average precipitation mm (inches)	285.3 (11.23)	242.8 (9.56)	233.1 (9.18)	91.3 (3.59)	10.5 (0.41)	0.4 (0.02)	0.1 (0.00)	0.1 (0.00)	3.0 (0.12)	23.3 (0.92)	158.3 (6.23)	295.0 (11.61)	1,343.2 (52.88)
Average precipitation days (≥ 1.0 mm)	23	20	20	8	1	0	0	0	0	3	14	24	113
Average relative humidity (%)	82.7	82.3	82.1	77.3	69.5	63.2	57.6	51.9	44.4	50.2	67.4	80.6	67.4
Mean monthly sunshine hours	133.3	134.4	179.8	222.0	288.3	297.0	306.9	306.9	279.0	251.1	207.0	151.9	2,757.6
Source: NOAA

Climate data for Chipata (1961-1990 normals)
Month	Jan	Feb	Mar	Apr	May	Jun	Jul	Aug	Sep	Oct	Nov	Dec	Year
Record high °C (°F)	32.1 (89.8)	31.8 (89.2)	32.4 (90.3)	32.7 (90.9)	32.2 (90.0)	29.9 (85.8)	29.9 (85.8)	33.0 (91.4)	36.1 (97.0)	37.5 (99.5)	38.0 (100.4)	34.9 (94.8)	38.0 (100.4)
Mean daily maximum °C (°F)	27.2 (81.0)	27.4 (81.3)	27.8 (82.0)	27.6 (81.7)	26.6 (79.9)	25.0 (77.0)	24.9 (76.8)	27.1 (80.8)	30.3 (86.5)	32.1 (89.8)	31.2 (88.2)	28.1 (82.6)	27.9 (82.2)
Daily mean °C (°F)	22.1 (71.8)	22.0 (71.6)	22.0 (71.6)	21.4 (70.5)	20.0 (68.0)	18.2 (64.8)	18.1 (64.6)	20.4 (68.7)	23.9 (75.0)	25.6 (78.1)	24.9 (76.8)	22.6 (72.7)	21.8 (71.2)
Mean daily minimum °C (°F)	18.2 (64.8)	18.0 (64.4)	17.9 (64.2)	16.7 (62.1)	14.2 (57.6)	11.7 (53.1)	11.8 (53.2)	14.2 (57.6)	17.7 (63.9)	19.9 (67.8)	19.6 (67.3)	18.6 (65.5)	16.5 (61.7)
Record low °C (°F)	13.2 (55.8)	13.2 (55.8)	11.8 (53.2)	9.7 (49.5)	6.5 (43.7)	3.3 (37.9)	4.0 (39.2)	3.7 (38.7)	7.2 (45.0)	12.4 (54.3)	12.8 (55.0)	13.3 (55.9)	3.3 (37.9)
Average precipitation mm (inches)	252.7 (9.95)	225.4 (8.87)	166.9 (6.57)	49.6 (1.95)	4.4 (0.17)	1.1 (0.04)	0.3 (0.01)	0.0 (0.0)	0.8 (0.03)	13.1 (0.52)	81.9 (3.22)	220.7 (8.69)	1,016.9 (40.04)
Average precipitation days (≥ 1.0 mm)	20	18	14	7	0	0	0	0	0	1	9	19	88
Average relative humidity (%)	80.7	81.5	78.8	72.1	64.4	59.8	55.9	48.9	42.7	45.2	56.6	75.4	63.5
Mean monthly sunshine hours	158.1	148.4	201.5	234.0	266.6	258.0	260.4	275.9	276.0	269.7	216.0	167.4	2,732
Source: NOAA

== Wind ==
Prevailing winds in the dry season are generally moderate, but occasionally more severe and may bring cool dust-laden air from distant arid regions. Whirlwinds are very common but not usually destructive. Waterspouts can be seen over lakes.

In the rainy season, winds are localised with thunderstorms and may be destructive but usually confined to small areas, such as blowing roofs off buildings. The country does not suffer tornadoes or cyclones of widespread destructive force.

== Climate change ==
Zambia is considered to be vulnerable to climate change. The main impact pathway of climate change in the country is through increasing variability in rainfall amounts during the agricultural season across the various agroecological regions, and shifts in the duration of the rainy season. Zambia is considered vulnerable to the impacts of climate change because the majority of the population rely on agriculture for their livelihoods - and changes in rainfall patterns has a negative impact due to the rainfed nature of production. Researched evidence suggested that temperature was likely to increase by 1.82 °C and rainfall reduce by 0.87 percentage points by 2050. This means that the occurrence of extreme climate events such as droughts and floods would become more frequent. Rainfall intensity results in heavy storms thereby causing floods that cause damage to property and crops.

In March 2025, US President Donald Trump canceled a USD 250,000 USAID grant to Zambia, dedicated to fighting climate change by promoting veganism and sustainable agriculture (for example agroforestry and permaculture). The plan included educational, business and governmental measures, respecting the cultural and agriculture landscsape of Zambia.
