= Shangombo =

- Town
- Location in Zambia
- Coordinates: 16°19′0″S 22°4′0″E
- Country: Zambia
- Province: Western Province
- District: Shangombo District
- Time zone: UTC+2 (CAT)

The small town of Shangombo located in Shangombo District in the Western Province of Zambia is one of the most remote towns in the country. It lies on the eastern bank of the floodplain of the Cuando River, and the bank (rather than the river channel) forms the border with Angola.

Shangombo town lies at the end of a sandy road, recently reconstructed, running 140 km (87 mi) west across the sandy forested plain from the Kalongola Ferry across the Zambezi River just south of Senanga.

Over the years (2000-2020), Shangombo experienced a net change of -19.2kha (-5.2%) in tree cover. In 2010, it had 11.9kha of tree cover, but in 2021, Shangombo lost 428ha of tree cover.
