= Nayuma Museum =

Art museum in Zambia

The Nayuma Museum is a museum in Mongu, Zambia, dedicated to promoting the arts and crafts of Barotseland.

The construction of Nayuma Museum started in 1983 with funding from various organizations.
