= Chitemene =

System of slash and burn agriculture in Zambia

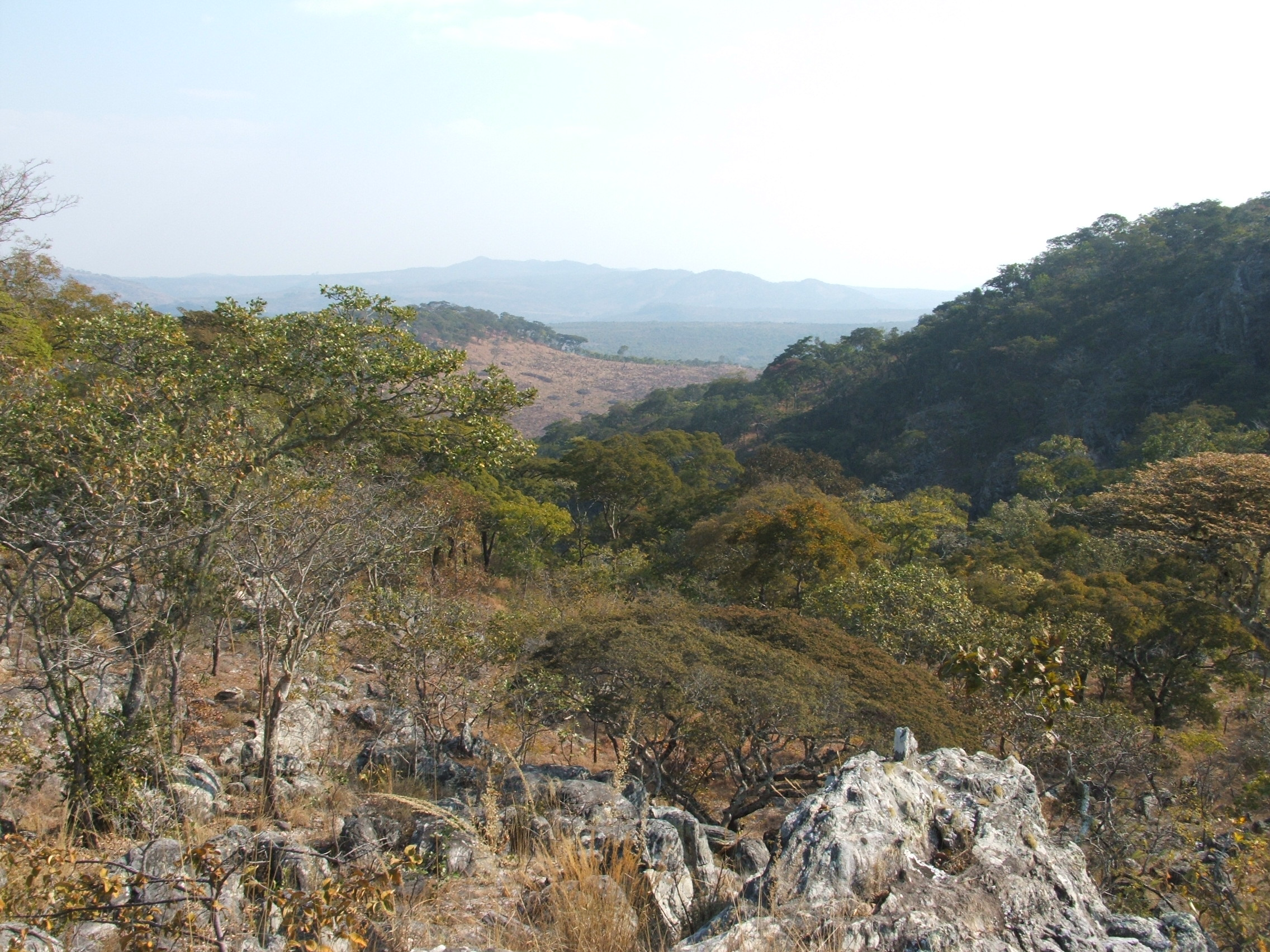
Chitemene field in Zambia

Chitemene (also spelled citemene), from the ciBemba word meaning “place where branches have been cut for a garden”, is a system of slash and burn agriculture practiced throughout northern Zambia. It involves coppicing or pollarding of standing trees in a primary or secondary growth Miombo origin

== Description ==
Chitemene systems are most widely used throughout the Central Zambezian Miombo woodlands that is the largest ecoregion in Zambia and the predominant ecoregion of Northwestern, Copperbelt, Central, Northern, and Luapula provinces. Typical soils in this biome are of the order oxisols, which are highly weathered, acidic, and easily leached soils. The pH of these soils range from 4.0 to 4.5, values too acidic for the cultivation of most common cereal grains and root crops in Zambia (maize, finger millet, sorghum, and cassava). The chitemene system, which creates a surplus of ash in concentrated spaces, raises the soil pH, enabling the cultivation of those crops. Furthermore, the heat generated by the burning of the biomass fumigates the soil, kills any existing weed seeds, and reduces the soil to a fine tilth, reducing labor requirements for cultivation of the soil.

The agricultural viability of a chitemene region is limited to a few years, until the soil pH declines. After the yield declines, a new area is cleared for chitemene, and the initial site is left to lie fallow. Typically, the regrowth of branches and natural leaf litter from the coppiced or pollarded stumps will restore soil fertility in 20 to 25 years, at which point the chitemene process is repeated.

== Types of chitemene ==
Though there are numerous variations on chitemene systems, three types of chitemene are practiced in distinct groupings in Northern Zambia, depending largely on the tribal traditions and soil characteristics of the specific area. The systems are distinguished from each other by the:

- Ratio of cleared area to that of the cultivated portion
- Shape and size of the cleared area and cultivated portion
- Period of cultivation
- Rotation of crops
- Staple crops

=== Large circle chitemene ===
Large circle chitemene is practiced in northeast Zambia over the extent of the Muchinga plateau within Luapula and Northern Provinces. In Luapula province, it is practiced uniformly in all districts in the portions outside the lowland areas surrounding Lake Bangweulu as well as those adjoining the Luapula River valley. In Northern province, it is practiced everywhere outside the aforementioned Bangweulu lowlands, the Chambeshi River flat, the areas west of Mpulungu and north of Lake Mweru Mwantipa, and near to the borders of Tanzania (where another rake-and-hoe system is practiced). By and large, the farmers engaged in large-circle chitemene are Bemba speakers, though not necessarily Bembas by tribe. Large circle chitemene has the following distinguishing features:

1. Pollarding of trees and stacking of branches into a circular or oval space comprising 1/6 to 1/10 of the area cleared.
2. Land use is from four to six years
3. Common crops include finger millet, cassava, groundnuts, beans, maize, and sorghum. The dominant crop in this area is cassava.
4. Area of cropped land (i.e. land cleared) is between 4 and 5.4 acres (22,000 m^{2}).

=== Small circle chitemene ===
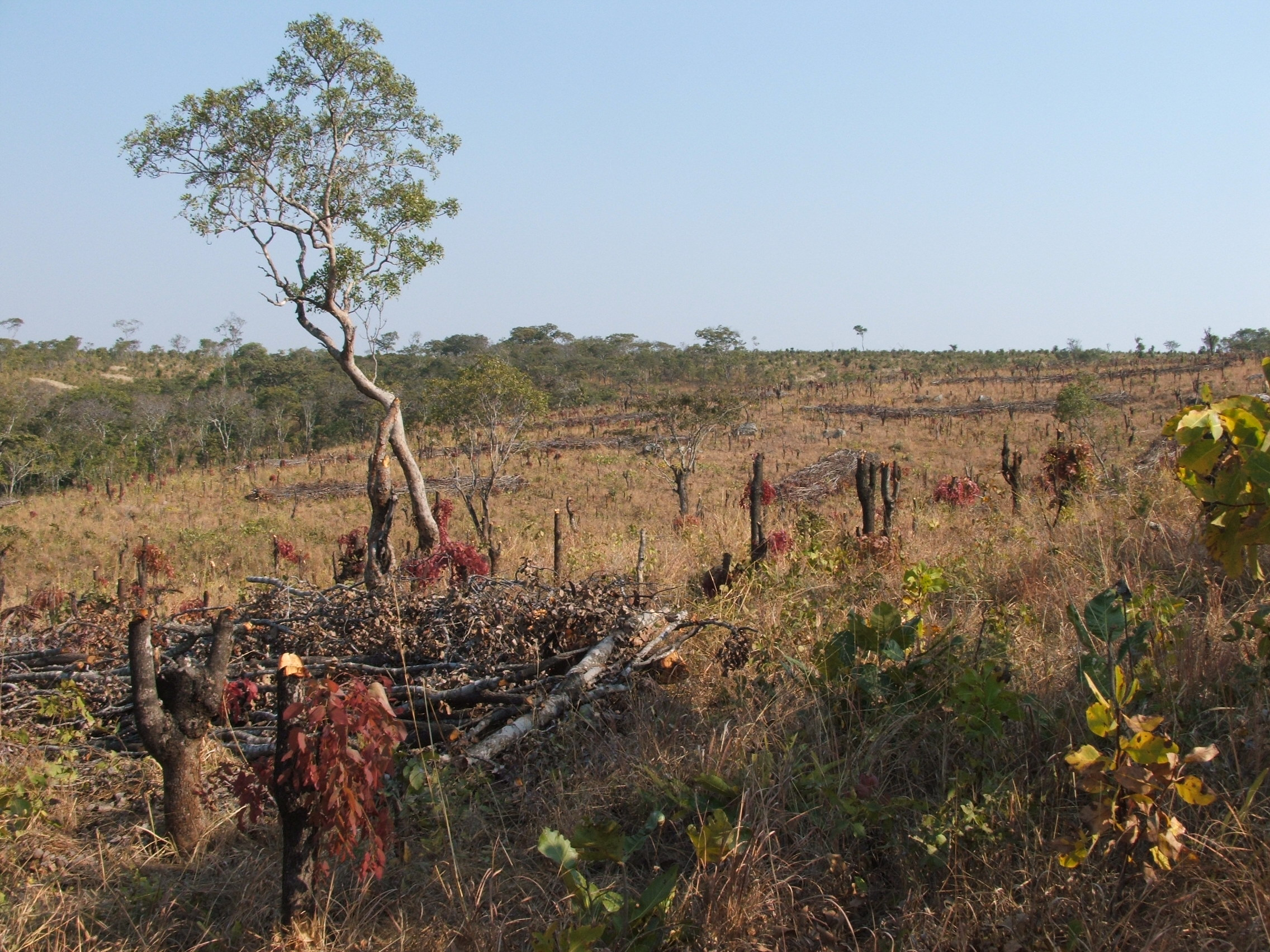
Small circle chitemene in Serenje, Central Zambia

This system is practiced in an area extending from the southern portion of Mpika District (Northern Province) westwards throughout the Muchinga Escarpment uplands of Central Province to the vicinity of Kapiri Mposhi. It is a common practice of the predominant tribes of the region, the Laala and Swaka peoples. Its main features include:

1. Coppicing of trees and stacking of trunks and branches into a series of long, rectangular-shaped mounds. Unlike large-circle chitemene, the cleared area may contain more than one mound to be burned or cultivated.
2. Immediate cultivated land use is for two to three years.
3. Predominant crops are millet, maize, and sorghum.

=== Block chitemene ===
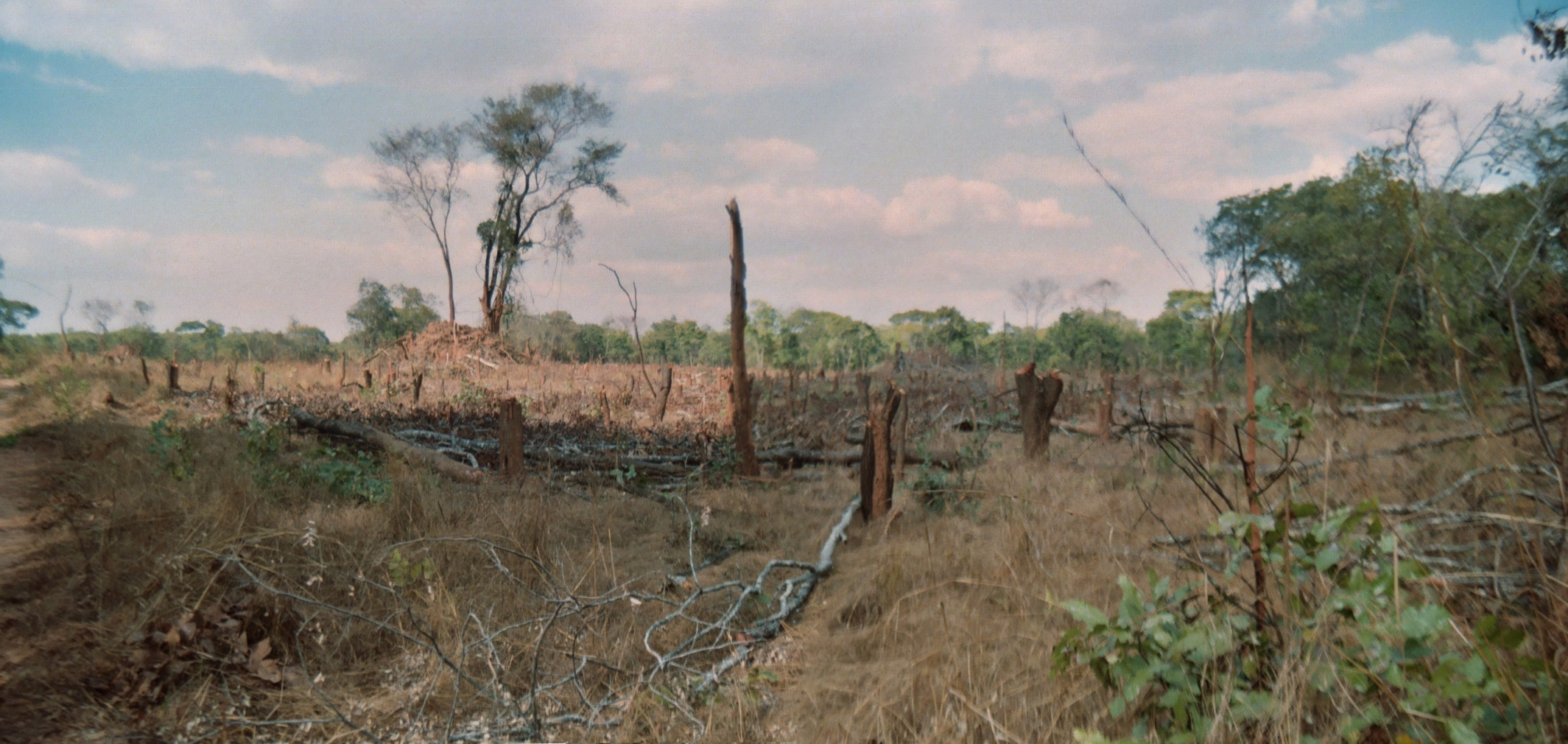
"Block Chitemene" in Kasempa District, Northwestern Zambia

This system is predominant from Kapiri Mposhi in the east to Mufumbwe in the west, and is a practice of the baLamba and baKaonde tribes of Central, Copperbelt, and Northwestern Provinces.

1. Due to the relative paucity of people and plenitude of land, large trees are base-cut, left to dry, and then burned before the rains. Crops are planted in both the cleared and burned areas to the extent that nearly all cleared land is planted.
2. Size of cleared land is approximately 2.3 acres (9,300 m^{2}).
3. Predominant crops are maize and sorghum.

== Ecological issues ==
Chitemene is an ecologically sound system in a situation where land pressure from population demands are low and ample woodland is present. In the past, when land and population were respectively plentiful and sparse, chitemene fields had ample time to lay fallow and recover before farmers returned to clear the field again. However, in contemporary Zambia, farmers switching from traditional crop rotations to monoculture of maize continue to practice chitemene. Unfortunately, the nutrient demands of maize tend to exhaust soils faster than traditional crops such as sorghum or millet, and the desire to sell maize as a commodity expedites the expansion of chitemene clearings.
