= Mongu =

Town in Western Province, Zambia

- Town
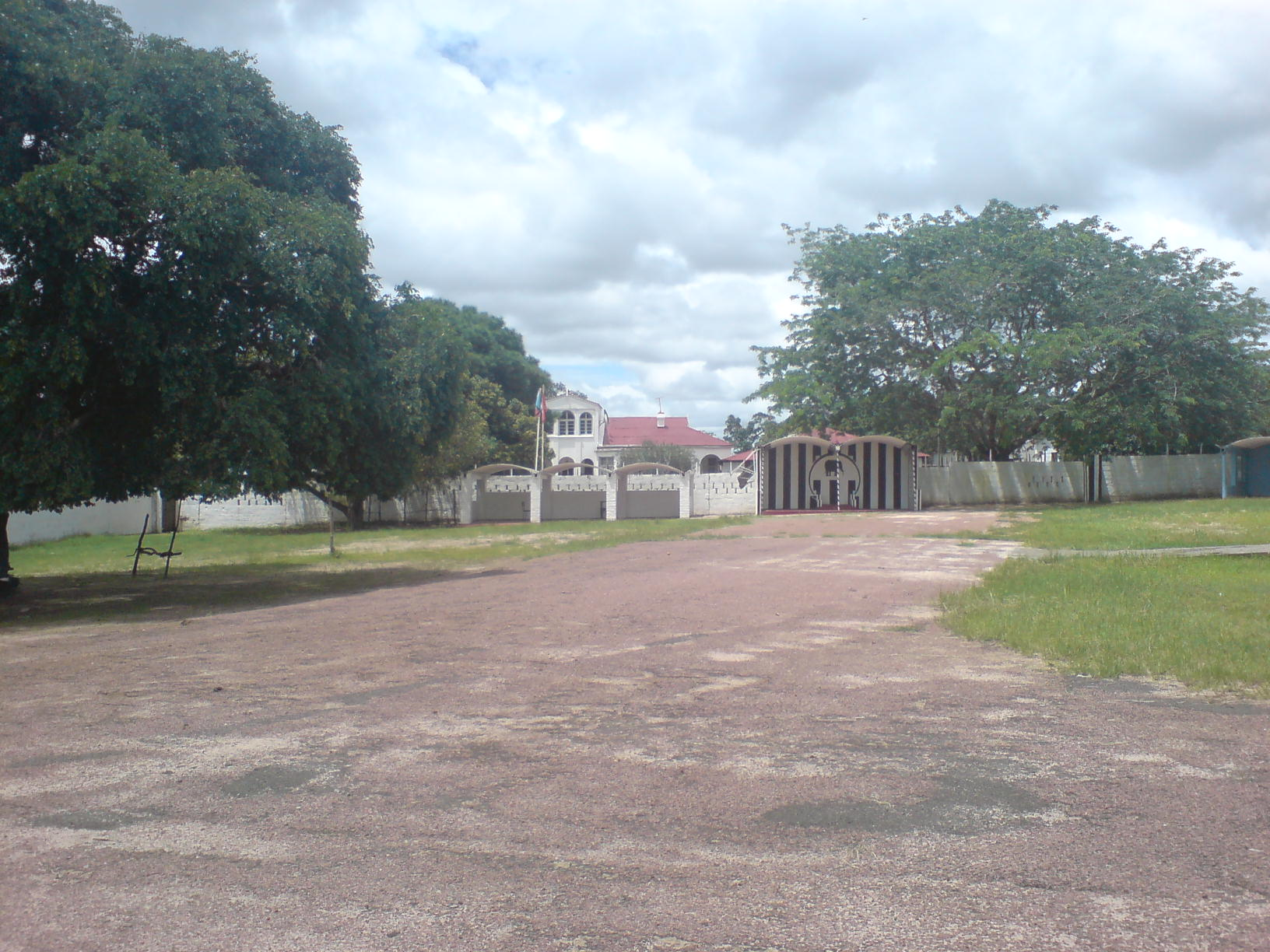
- Litunga's Winter Palace Limulunga

- Location in Zambia
- Coordinates: 15°16′39″S 23°7′55″E
- Country: Zambia
- Province: Western Province
- District: Mongu District
- Elevation: 3,340 ft (1,018 m)

Population (2010)
  - Total: 179,585

Mongu is the capital of Western Province in Zambia and was the capital of the formerly-named province and historic state of Barotseland. Its population is 179,585 (2010 census), and it is also the headquarters of Mongu District. Mongu is the home of the Litunga, King of the Lozi people (currently Lubosi Imwiko III).

The town's original name was mungu.

== Geography ==
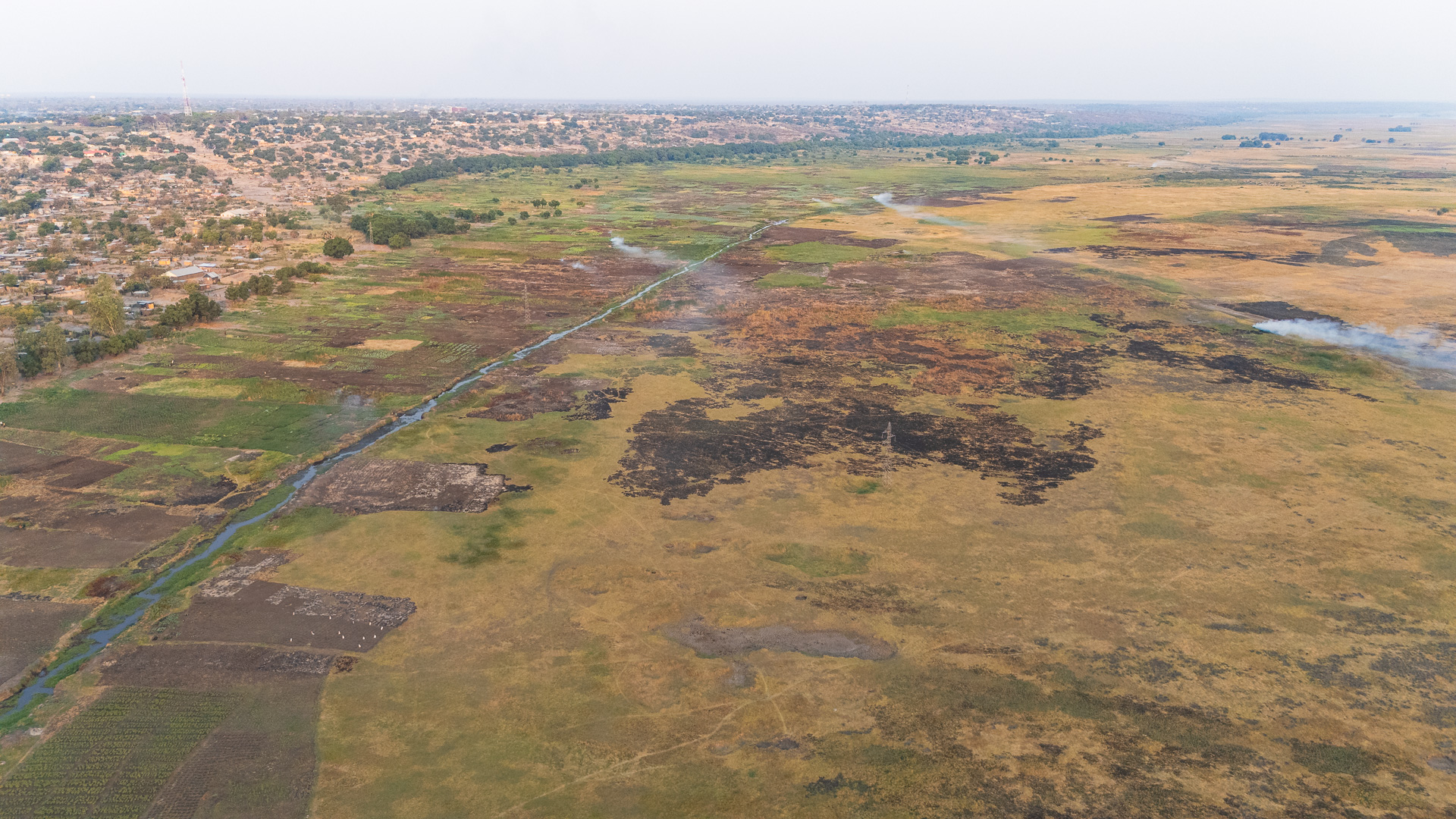
The edge of Mongu city reaching Barotse floodplains at the Zambezi River.

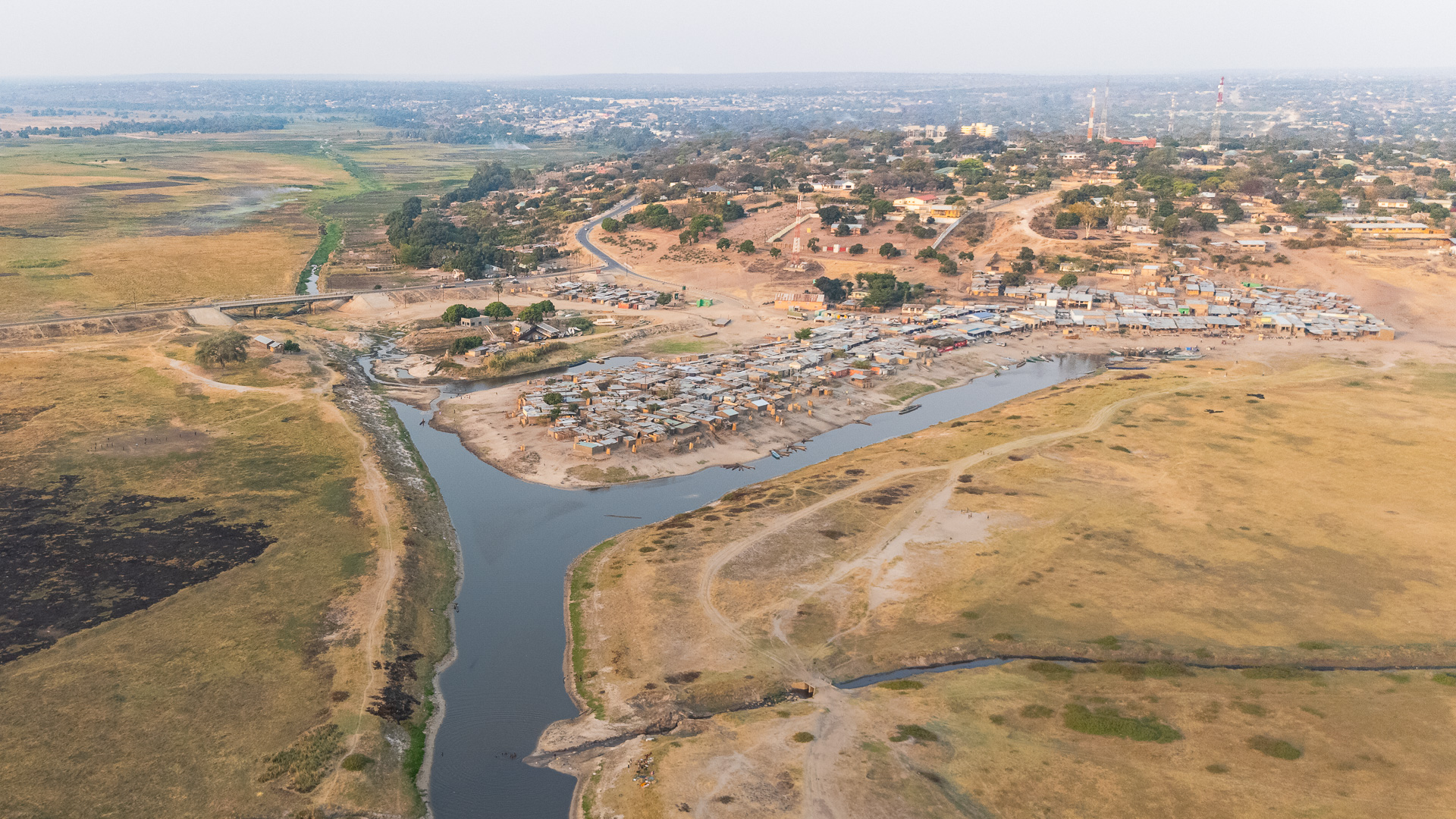
Small harbour at the edge of Mongu city reaching Barotse floodplains of the Zambezi River.

Mongu is situated on a small blunt promontory of higher ground on the eastern edge of the 30-kilometre-wide Barotse Floodplain of the Zambezi River running north–south, which in the wet season floods right up to the town. The city is 15 kilometres from the river's main channel, to which its small harbour is connected in the dry season by a 35-kilometre route via a canal and a meandering channel. The whole region is flat and sandy, with the dry land generally no more than 50 m higher than the floodplain.

== Demographics ==
Mongu is the home city of the Lozi (or Barotse) people, who speak a language derived in part from that of the Makololo, related to the South African Sesotho language. The Lozi ruler, the Litunga, has a dry season palace 12 km north-west at Lealui on the floodplain, and a flood season palace on higher ground at Limulunga, 17 km north. The Kuomboka ceremony marks the court's transfer between the two locations.

At the end of the 18th century, a significant number of Mbunda from Angola settled here.

== Climate ==
Mongu has a tropical savanna climate (Köppen Aw). The area has an annual average rainfall of 945 mm falling in the rainy season from late October to April. The flood usually arrives by January, peaks in April and is gone by June, leaving a floodplain green with new grass on which a population of about 250,000 moves in to graze a similar number of cattle, catch fish and raise crops in small gardens. Mongu is hot from September to December, with a mean maximum for October of 35.4 °C, and cool from May to August, with a mean maximum in June of 26.9 °C and a mean minimum of 10.3 °C.

Climate data for Mongu (1991–2020)
Month	Jan	Feb	Mar	Apr	May	Jun	Jul	Aug	Sep	Oct	Nov	Dec	Year
Record high °C (°F)	39.0 (102.2)	36.9 (98.4)	38.2 (100.8)	39.0 (102.2)	34.7 (94.5)	33.8 (92.8)	35.5 (95.9)	40.5 (104.9)	41.5 (106.7)	41.5 (106.7)	39.8 (103.6)	38.0 (100.4)	41.5 (106.7)
Mean daily maximum °C (°F)	29.8 (85.6)	29.7 (85.5)	30.2 (86.4)	30.9 (87.6)	29.6 (85.3)	27.8 (82.0)	27.9 (82.2)	31.1 (88.0)	34.7 (94.5)	35.6 (96.1)	32.5 (90.5)	30.3 (86.5)	30.8 (87.4)
Daily mean °C (°F)	24.7 (76.5)	24.6 (76.3)	24.7 (76.5)	23.9 (75.0)	21.7 (71.1)	19.3 (66.7)	19.1 (66.4)	22.1 (71.8)	25.9 (78.6)	27.5 (81.5)	26.0 (78.8)	24.8 (76.6)	23.7 (74.7)
Mean daily minimum °C (°F)	19.5 (67.1)	19.5 (67.1)	19.2 (66.6)	16.9 (62.4)	13.7 (56.7)	10.7 (51.3)	10.2 (50.4)	13.1 (55.6)	17.0 (62.6)	19.4 (66.9)	19.4 (66.9)	19.3 (66.7)	16.5 (61.7)
Record low °C (°F)	12.9 (55.2)	11.5 (52.7)	9.1 (48.4)	7.5 (45.5)	2.7 (36.9)	−1.6 (29.1)	0.3 (32.5)	−1.6 (29.1)	7.4 (45.3)	9.2 (48.6)	11.1 (52.0)	13.8 (56.8)	−1.6 (29.1)
Average precipitation mm (inches)	229.3 (9.03)	210.8 (8.30)	141.0 (5.55)	29.8 (1.17)	5.1 (0.20)	0.3 (0.01)	0.0 (0.0)	0.0 (0.0)	2.1 (0.08)	20.3 (0.80)	95.1 (3.74)	227.7 (8.96)	965.7 (38.02)
Average relative humidity (%)	78.9	80.0	77.6	68.3	58.9	53.6	47.3	39.7	34.2	48.5	64.2	76.8	60.7
Mean monthly sunshine hours	198.4	179.2	226.3	267.0	306.9	297.0	313.1	313.1	288.0	266.6	216.0	195.3	3,066.9
Source: NOAA (humidity, sun 1961–1990)

== Ecology ==
Three ecoregions are represented in Mongu and its vicinity: the floodplain comprises Zambezian flooded grasslands, while the higher dry ground is a mosaic of Central Zambezian Miombo woodlands and Cryptosepalum dry forests. To the east the soil is very sandy and there are many pans which dry out in the dry season, and beyond the Lui River no surface water is available so this zone of scrubby miombo woodland is practically uninhabited as far east as the Luampa River.

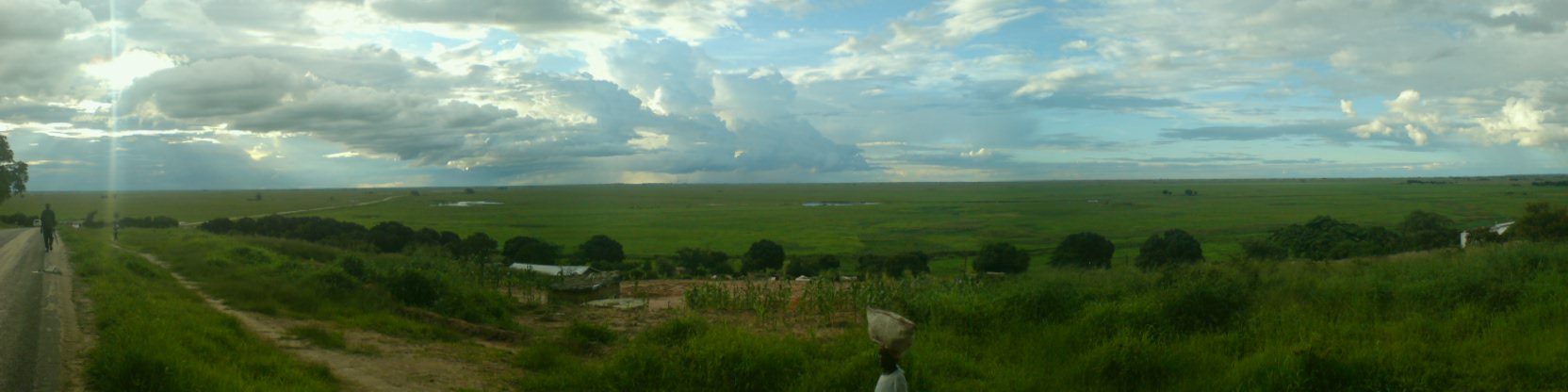
A panorama from Mongu

== Economy ==
Mongu lies at the end of the 590-km Lusaka–Mongu Road from Lusaka. The road to Kalabo called the Barotse Floodplain causeway was completed and opened in 2016. It is also at the end of the M10 road, which connects it to Senanga, to the Katima Mulilo Border with Namibia and to Livingstone.

The city is known for basket and carpet weaving. It produces the best mango and fish in the country, especially the tiger fish. Mongu is also a major rice growing region of Zambia.

It is also home to a cathedral and a water tower, while among the several shopping places and social places, the town has a large market and an airport. Mongu Airport is mainly used by the Zambian Air Force and the United Nations to transport Angolan Refugees back to Angola. The town is also the location of the Nayuma Museum.
