= Liuwa Plain National Park =

National park in Zambia

- IUCN category II (national park)
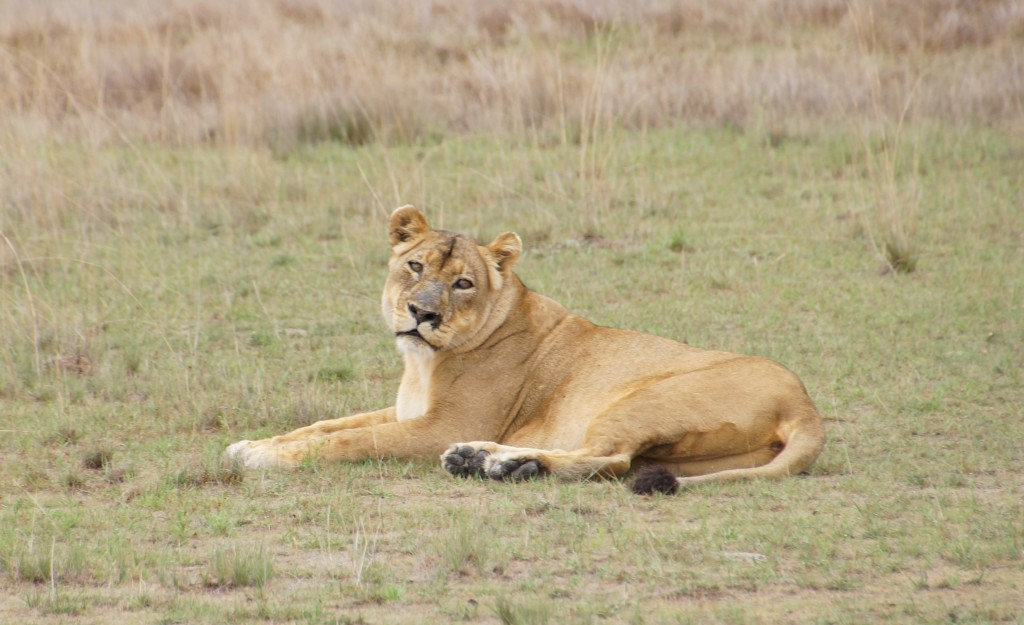
- Lady Liuwa in November 2012

- Location within Zambia
- Location: Kalabo District, Western Province, Zambia
- Nearest city: Kalabo, Zambia
- Coordinates: 14°30′S 22°29′E
- Area: 3,369 km^{2} (1,301 sq mi)
- Established: 1972
- Governing body: African Parks

Borders of Liuwa Plain National Park

Liuwa Plain National Park is a 3,369-square-kilometre (1,301 sq mi) national park in Zambia's Western Province. "Liuwa" means "plain" in the local Liuwa language, a dialect of Lozi language, and the plains originally served as a hunting ground for Lubosi Lewanika, the Litunga (king or paramount chief) of the Lozi people. The area was designated as a protected area by Lubosi Lewanika in the early 1880s, and as a national park in 1972, when Zambia's government took over management. The nonprofit conservation organization African Parks has managed Liuwa in partnership with the Department of National Parks and Wildlife and the Barotse Royal Establishment since 2003.

The park's grasslands support a variety of large mammals, including tens of thousands of blue wildebeest, whose annual migration is Africa's second-largest. Frequently sighted large predators include the cheetah, spotted hyena, and lion, the most famous of which was a female resident called Lady Liuwa, who was the subject of a National Geographic documentary (The Last Lioness) before she died of natural causes in 2017. Lady Liuwa was the only remaining lion in the area, following years of excess hunting, prior to African Parks' assuming management and introducing additional lions to encourage the re-establishment of a pride. More than 300 bird species have been recorded in Liuwa, which has experienced limited tourism until recently. Animal populations have since stabilized, despite declines and local extinctions during the 1990s–2000s.

== History ==
Before the national park was established, the area served as the hunting ground for Lubosi Lewanika (1842–1916), who was the Litunga (king or paramount chief) of the Lozi people in Barotseland between 1878 and 1916. Lubosi Lewanika designated Liuwa Plain as a protected area in the early 1880s.

National park designation was granted in 1972, and Zambia's government took over management. Despite gaining such status, increased human pressure led to an increase in poaching in the park. African Parks has managed the park in partnership with the Department of National Parks and Wildlife (DNPW) and the Barotse Royal Establishment (BRE) since 2003. Local interest in preserving the park and its wildlife has reportedly subsequently increased since management has improved and the area's connection to the Litunga was restored.

== Tourism ==
Tourism to the park was limited until recently, with only 50 tourists visiting Liuwa in 2000, and less than 800 people reportedly visiting in 2014. African Parks and Norman Carr Safaris opened a luxury lodge and helicopter service, to make the park more accessible for tourists. The safari company worked with African Parks to fund the lodge, worth US$1.6 million. King Lewanika Lodge, named after the former Litunga, can accommodate fifteen guests and includes six villas, one of which has two bedrooms. In 2016, Proflight announced plans for regular flights between Lusaka and Kalabo, further improving access to the park.

== Flora and fauna ==
Liuwa Plain lies within the Barotse Floodplain, and is bounded by the Luambimba River to the north and Luanginga River to the south. The park is prominently made up of a grassland that measures approximately 72 by 32 km (45 by 20 mi), scattered with raffia palms and woodlands. Recorded grass species include Echinochloa stagnina and Vossia cuspidata , which are important for grazing herbivores, as well as Baikiaea plurijuga, Guibourtia coleosperma, Peltophorum africanum, Terminalia sericea, and various types of Hyphaene.

=== Mammals ===
Liuwa is home to a variety of mammals, including Cape buffalo, common eland, common tsessebe, oribi, red lechwe, reedbuck, roan antelope, Lichtenstein's hartebeest, and migrating blue wildebeest, which gather in the tens of thousands. Liuwa's wildebeest migration is the second-largest in Africa.

A survey conducted in 1991 recorded population estimates of 30,000 blue wildebeest, 800 tsessebe, 1,000 zebra, and 10,000 other large mammals, including buffalo, eland, oribi, red lechwe, reedbuck, and sitatunga. Subsequent surveys suggested major population declines, with possible eradication of buffalo, eland, Lichtenstein's hartebeest, and roan antelope. However, improved protections since 2003 has stabilized populations. Eland and buffalo have been reintroduced, and the zebra population has increased to over 4,000 individuals. Lichtenstein's hartebeest were reintroduced in late 2025, after disappearing 50 years ago.

Predators include the cheetah, leopard, lion, African wild dog and spotted hyena. According to the nonprofit conservation organization African Parks, all but one of the park's lions were eradicated during the 1990s due to poaching and trophy hunting. Liuwa's lone lioness, known as Lady Liuwa, was first reported to be present in the park in 2002. The organization has since led the introductions of several additional lions to reestablish a breeding pride in Liuwa. Today, the population has grown to around 20 resident lions, and they are actively breeding.

In an effort to reestablish the species to the park, 11 African wild dogs (eight males from South Africa and three females from Kafue National Park) were translocated to the park in late 2021. The animals were kept in a split compartment boma to bond, after which they were released in April 2022 and started to immediately move as a pack. Their population has increased to 25 individuals today.

Smaller omnivores in Liuwa include the banded mongoose and side-striped jackal.

Since 2005, the protected area is considered a Lion Conservation Unit.

==== Lady Liuwa and the park's lion population ====
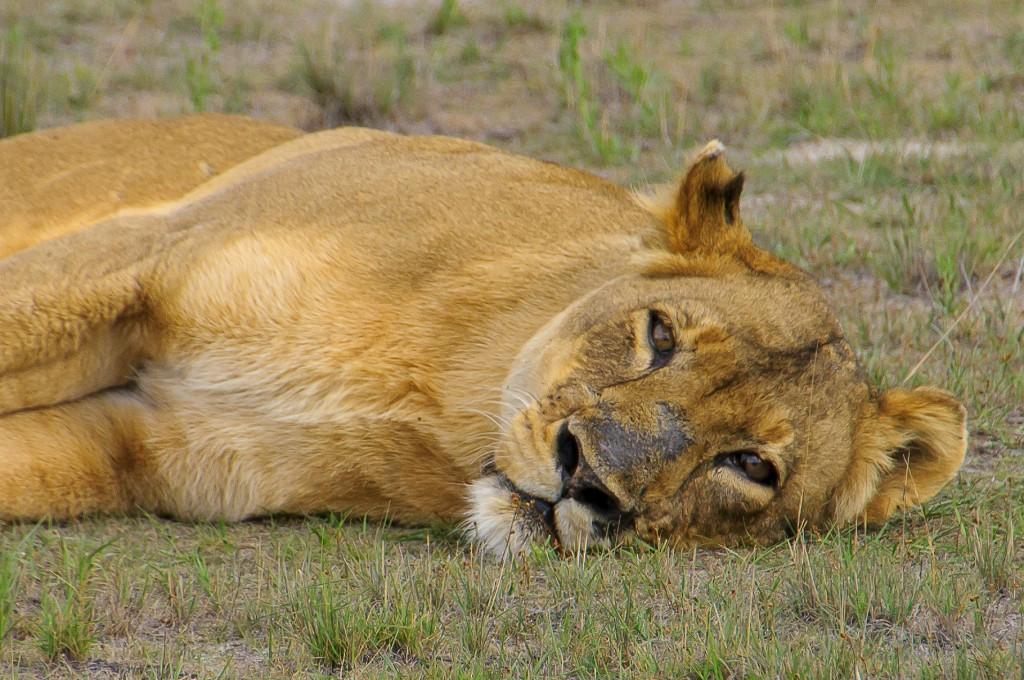
The park's most well-known resident was a lioness called Lady Liuwa (pictured in 2012), who died of natural causes in 2017.

Lady Liuwa was the park's most prominent resident, and was the subject of a National Geographic documentary released in 2010. According to folklore, the lioness was a reincarnation of Mambeti, a member of the Lozi tribe who lived and died in the park, and a grandmother to several staff who were still working in the park, as of 2016. Lady Liuwa was first reported to be present in the park in 2002, and was said to have visited the woodlands often where Mambeti was buried.

In 2008, after no lions returned to the park naturally, African Parks attempted to introduce a male lion, but he died during the relocation. Two other males were reintroduced in 2009. Both of them reportedly mated with Lady Liuwa, but she was infertile. The two male lions left Liuwa and made their way to Angola; one was killed by locals and the other, Nakawa, returned to the park on his own. Two lionesses were relocated from Kafue National Park to Liuwa in 2011; one of them was killed by trapping in 2012, and the other, Sepo, had to be returned to Liuwa after migrating out of the area. Sepo was captured, helicoptered back, and placed in a boma with Lady Liuwa. The pair bonded and were released after two months. After mating with Nakawa, Sepo gave birth to one male and two female cubs in December 2013. Nakawa was later killed, possibly from being poisoned. An unidentified lion was seen in the park in 2015.

In September 2016, a collaborative project between African Parks, the Mushingashi Conservancy, the Zambia Carnivore Programme, and Zambia's Department of National Parks and Wildlife (DPNW) introduced another male lion to Liuwa Plain from Kafue National Park. The lion bonded with another in a boma for two months, and were then released.

Lady Liuwa died of natural causes on August 9, 2017.

=== Birds and reptiles ===
334 bird species, including various species of birds of prey, bustards, cranes (including grey crowned cranes and the endangered wattled crane), pelicans, pratincoles, and storks, have been recorded in Liuwa. Raptors include the bateleur, greater kestrel, martial eagle, palm-nut vulture, and Pel's fishing owl, as well as African fish eagles. Recorded water birds include the marabou, open-billed, saddle-billed, and yellow-billed stork, as well as the blacksmith lapwing, egrets (including the slaty egret), the grey heron, pygmy geese, the spur-winged goose, and the three-banded plover. The black-winged pratincole, Denham's bustard, long-tailed widowbird, pink-billed lark, rosy-throated longclaw, secretary bird, sharp-tailed starling, swamp boubou, white-bellied bustard, and white-cheeked bee-eater are also present, as are clapper larks.

Liuwa Plain National Park also provides habitat for various snake species.

== See also ==
- Wildlife of Zambia
