= Senanga =

- Town
- Location in Zambia
- Coordinates: 16°07′00″S 23°16′00″E
- Country: Zambia
- Province: Western Province
- District: Senanga District
- Time zone: UTC+2 (CAT)

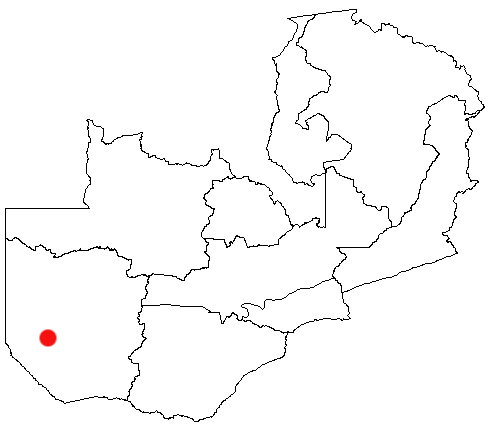
Location of Senanga in Zambia

Senanga is the capital of the Senanga District, which is located in the Western Province of Zambia. The town is situated on the eastern bank of the Zambezi River, at the southern end of the Barotse Floodplain. It lies on the main road running parallel to the river from Livingstone and Sesheke to Mongu. Recently the Kaunga Lyeti Bridge was completed to cross the Kaunga Lyeti River near the junction to Sioma, traveling from Sesheke and Katima Mulilo. On top of the bridgework, recent road projects (the roads to Mongu and Sesheke) have improved travel conditions and inspired economic confidence and growth.

In addition to the river and floodplain with its wildlife and fishing opportunities, Senanga is about 120 km (75 mi) from Sioma Ngwezi National Park and about 80 km (50 mi) from Ngonye Falls. It has a hotel and serves as a base for fishing tours by boat. A tall radio mast makes a prominent landmark in the town.

Senanga's location, situated on the Zambezi River, is known for its plentiful fish populations. Each year the town holds the Zambia Sport Fishing Competition, which attracts local and international participants. However, the area is prone to illegal fishing which is having a major impact on important breeding grounds of nembwe, tigerfish and slidejaw.

== Climate ==
Climate data for Senanga (1991-2020, extremes 1961-present)
Month	Jan	Feb	Mar	Apr	May	Jun	Jul	Aug	Sep	Oct	Nov	Dec	Year
Record high °C (°F)	38.6 (101.5)	37.9 (100.2)	37.8 (100.0)	35.6 (96.1)	34.3 (93.7)	32.0 (89.6)	33.3 (91.9)	39.5 (103.1)	39.5 (103.1)	41.9 (107.4)	40.2 (104.4)	38.6 (101.5)	41.9 (107.4)
Mean daily maximum °C (°F)	30.5 (86.9)	30.7 (87.3)	30.9 (87.6)	30.9 (87.6)	29.8 (85.6)	27.7 (81.9)	27.6 (81.7)	31.3 (88.3)	34.8 (94.6)	35.8 (96.4)	33.3 (91.9)	31.7 (89.1)	31.3 (88.3)
Mean daily minimum °C (°F)	19.0 (66.2)	19.0 (66.2)	18.7 (65.7)	16.3 (61.3)	12.8 (55.0)	9.7 (49.5)	9.1 (48.4)	11.6 (52.9)	16.2 (61.2)	18.6 (65.5)	18.4 (65.1)	18.6 (65.5)	15.7 (60.3)
Record low °C (°F)	10.7 (51.3)	11.9 (53.4)	12.7 (54.9)	9.8 (49.6)	2.5 (36.5)	1.2 (34.2)	1.2 (34.2)	4.5 (40.1)	7.3 (45.1)	11.5 (52.7)	11.0 (51.8)	11.1 (52.0)	1.2 (34.2)
Average precipitation mm (inches)	200 (7.9)	162 (6.4)	108 (4.3)	21 (0.8)	2 (0.1)	1 (0.0)	0 (0)	0 (0)	1 (0.0)	15 (0.6)	84 (3.3)	155 (6.1)	749 (29.5)
Average precipitation days (≥ 1.0 mm)	16	14	10	3	0	0	0	0	0	6	11	14	74
Average relative humidity (%) (daily average)	74.3	73.4	70.3	61.8	53.8	48.1	43.7	37.8	33.6	44.4	58.2	70.7	55.9
Mean monthly sunshine hours	226.3	210.0	241.8	279.0	310.0	297.0	313.1	322.4	288.0	254.2	222.0	241.8	3,205.6
Source: NOAA (precipitation days 1979–1991, humidity 1983–1991, sunshine 1981–1990)

== Sister cities ==
- Kelowna, Canada.
