= Sioma Ngwezi National Park =

National park in Zambia

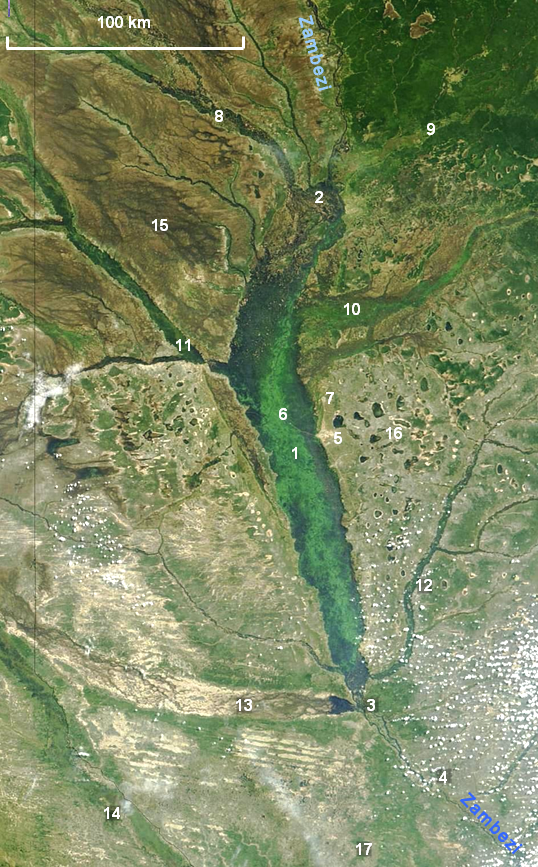
- Sioma Ngwezi National Park (#17), Barotse Floodpiain

- Location within Zambia
- Location: Zambia
- Coordinates: 17.25099°S 23.43109°E
- Area: 5,000 km^{2} (1,900 sq mi)

Sioma Ngwezi National Park is a 5,000-square-kilometre park in the south west corner of Zambia. It is undeveloped and rarely visited, lacking roads and being off the usual tourist tracks, but this may change in the future.

== Description ==
Like most national parks in Zambia, it is unfenced allowing free movement of the animals, and it is surrounded by buffer zones where hunting is regulated, called Game Management Areas (GMAs). The West Zambezi GMA adjacent to the park is the largest in the country at 35,000 square kilometres.

The park occupies part of large plain lying between the Zambezi, the Cuando River (the upper Chobe River), and the Caprivi Strip, called the Silowana Plains, lying south of the Barotse Floodplain. They were once part of the Kalahari Desert and covered in wind-blown sand-dunes, still present as gentle undulations and a sandy soil. Although the climate is now wetter, permanent rivers do not flow through the plains, only a few seasonal ones, and in the rainy season thousands of small lagoons, typically a couple of hundred metres across, form in the depressions between the dunes. Two ecoregions are well represented in the park, Zambezian Baikiaea woodlands dominated by Zambian Teak trees, which surrounds plains of Western Zambezian grasslands. Along the major rivers surrounding the park is a third ecoregion, Zambezian flooded grasslands.

== Fauna ==
The Park and surrounding GMA form an important link in the migratory route of elephants and wildebeest from the nearby national parks of Botswana and Namibia. Although still poached, the park does offer a better refuge for elephants migrating from Angola where poaching and illegal hunting has been rampant during and in the aftermath of the civil war there.

The park is home to over 3,000 African bush elephants, and roan antelope, sable antelope, puku, impala, Grant's zebra, and kudu. Several endangered species including Cape wild dog and South African cheetah are also present.

Since 2005, the protected area is considered a Lion Conservation Unit.

== Tourism ==
There are no facilities except for campsites and no roads in the park, only tracks requiring four-wheel drive vehicles even in the dry season, when vehicles can become bogged in sand. In 2007 several tour operators were taking guided safaris into the park. According to the Zambian government plans are in hand to open the park to private management and provide better wildlife protection. The proximity to Angola, Namibia and Botswana makes it ripe for transfrontier parks initiatives.

== Notes ==
This park is considered for inclusion in the 5 Nation Kavango - Zambezi Transfrontier Conservation Area.

== See also ==
- Wildlife of Zambia
