= Limulunga =

Human settlement in Zambia

- Town
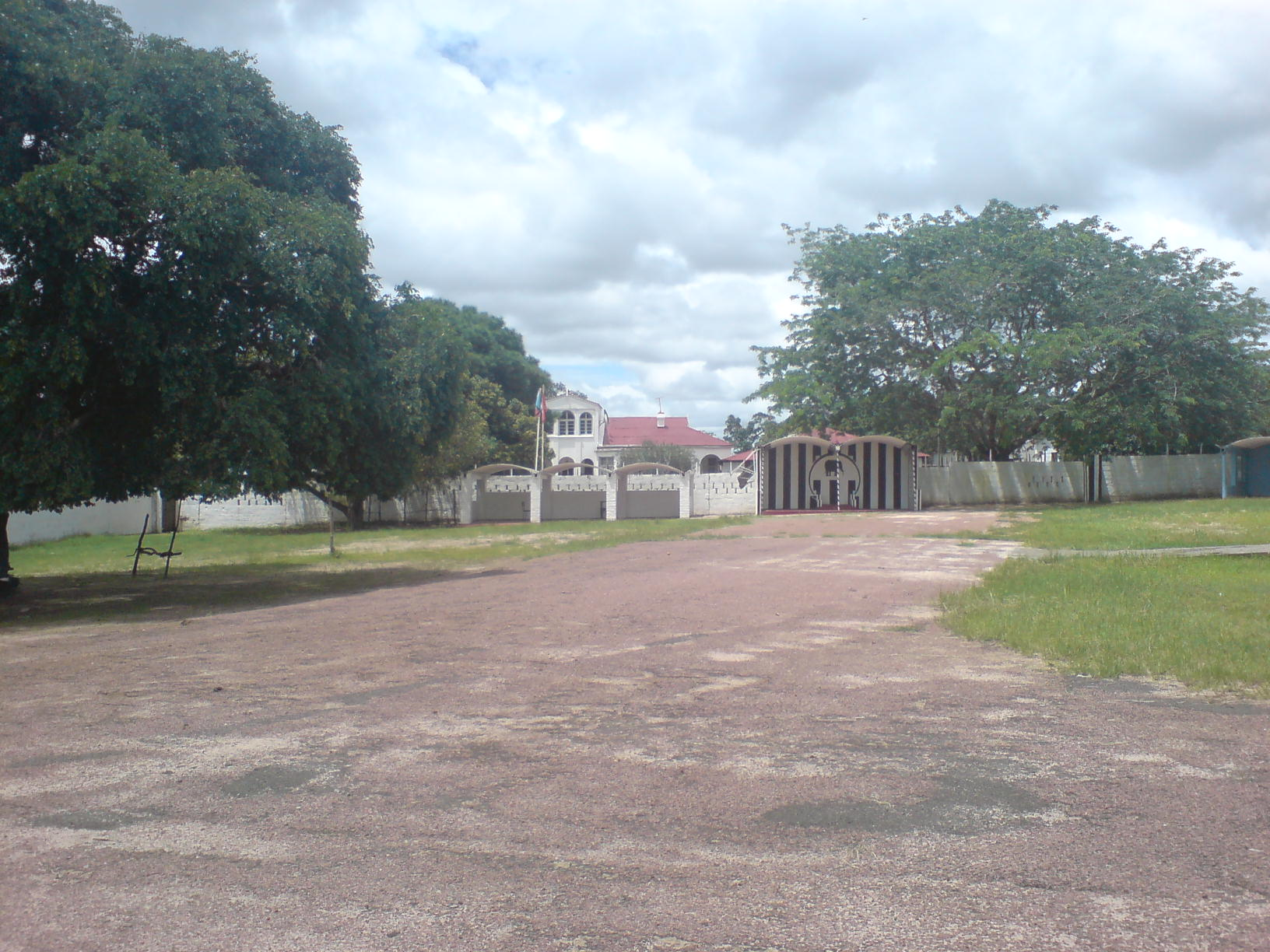
- The Litunga's palace in Limulunga

- Location in Zambia
- Coordinates: 15°08′S 23°09′E
- Country: Zambia
- Province: Western Province
- District: Limulunga District
- Time zone: UTC+2 (CAT)

Limulunga is one of the two compounds of the Litunga, king of the Lozi people of western Zambia. It lies on high ground at the edge of the Barotse Floodplain of the Zambezi river, about 15 km north of the town of Mongu and 21 km east of the main channel of the river. The Litunga's other compound at Lealui is used during the dry season, with Limulunga being used during the rainy season. The annual move between the two compounds is celebrated in the Kuomboka festival.
