= Luanginga River =

River in Angola and Zambia

Coordinates: 14°10′S 22°00′E

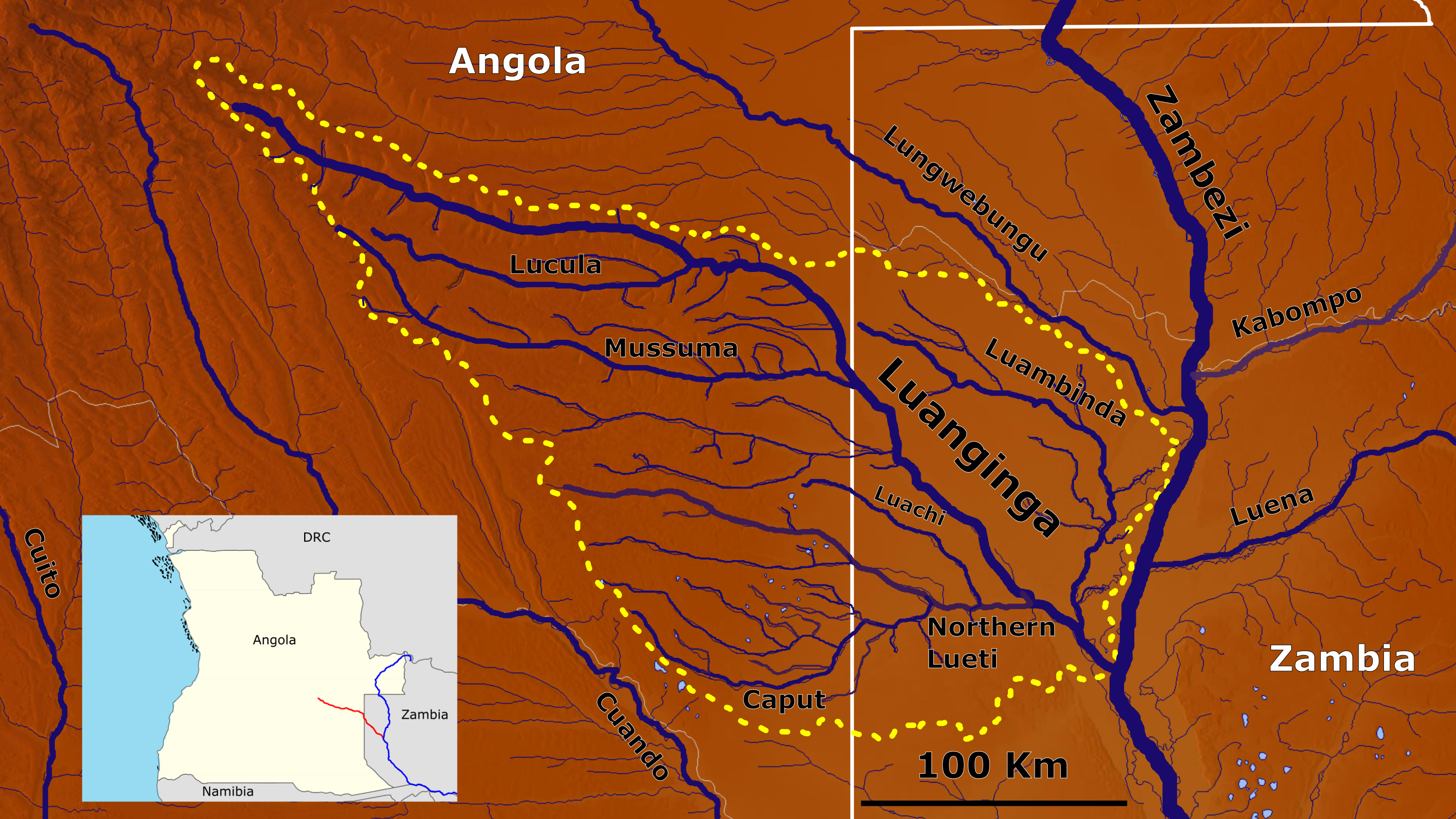
- Luanginga River catchment

Location
- Countries: Angola, Zambia

Physical characteristics
- Mouth: Zambezi River

The Luanginga is a river rising in Angola, which flows into the Zambezi in western Zambia.
