= List of airports by IATA code: S =

IATA	ICAO	Airport name	Location served
-SA-
SAA	KSAA	Shively Field	Saratoga, Wyoming, United States
SAB	TNCS	Juancho E. Yrausquin Airport	Saba, Caribbean Netherlands
SAC	KSAC	Sacramento Executive Airport	Sacramento, California, United States
SAD	KSAD	Safford Regional Airport	Safford, Arizona, United States
SAF	KSAF	Santa Fe Municipal Airport	Santa Fe, New Mexico, United States
SAG		Shirdi Airport	Shirdi, Maharashtra, India
SAH	OYSN	Sanaa International Airport (El Rahaba Airport)	Sanaa, Yemen
SAI	VDSA	Siem Reap–Angkor International Airport	Siem Reap, Cambodia
SAK	BIKR	Sauðárkrókur Airport	Sauðárkrókur, Iceland
SAL	MSLP	Monseñor Óscar Arnulfo Romero International Airport	San Salvador, El Salvador
SAM		Salamo Airport	Salamo, Papua New Guinea
SAN	KSAN	San Diego International Airport	San Diego, California, United States
SAO		metropolitan area^{1}	São Paulo, São Paulo, Brazil
SAP	MHLM	Ramón Villeda Morales International Airport	San Pedro Sula, Honduras
SAQ	MYAN	San Andros Airport	Nicholls Town, Andros Island, Bahamas
SAR	KSAR	Sparta Community Airport (Hunter Field)	Sparta, Illinois, United States
SAS	KSAS	Salton Sea Airport	Salton City, California, United States
SAT	KSAT	San Antonio International Airport	San Antonio, Texas, United States
SAU	WATS	Tardamu Airport	Savu (Sawu), Indonesia
SAV	KSAV	Savannah/Hilton Head International Airport	Savannah, Georgia, United States
SAW	LTFJ	Sabiha Gökçen International Airport	Istanbul, Turkey
SAX		Sambú Airport	Sambú, Panama
SAY	LIQS	Siena–Ampugnano Airport	Siena, Tuscany, Italy
SAZ	GLST	Sasstown Airport	Sasstown, Liberia
-SB-
SBA	KSBA	Santa Barbara Municipal Airport	Santa Barbara, California, United States
SBB	SVSB	Santa Bárbara de Barinas Airport	Santa Bárbara, Venezuela
SBC	AYSO	Selbang Airport	Selbang, Papua New Guinea
SBD	KSBD	San Bernardino International Airport	San Bernardino, California, United States
SBE	AYSA	Suabi Airport	Suabi, Papua New Guinea
SBF	OADS	Sardeh Band Airport	Band-e Sardeh Dam, Afghanistan
SBG	WITN	Maimun Saleh Airport	Sabang, Indonesia
SBH	TFFJ	Gustaf III Airport	Gustavia, Saint Barthélemy
SBI	GUSB	Sambailo Airport	Koundara, Guinea
SBJ	SNMX	São Mateus Airport	São Mateus, Espírito Santo, Brazil
SBK	LFRT	Saint-Brieuc – Armor Airport	Saint-Brieuc, Brittany, France
SBL	SLSA	Santa Ana del Yacuma Airport	Santa Ana del Yacuma, Bolivia
SBM	KSBM	Sheboygan County Memorial Airport	Sheboygan, Wisconsin, United States
SBN	KSBN	South Bend International Airport	South Bend, Indiana, United States
SBO		Salina-Gunnison Airport (FAA: 44U)	Salina / Gunnison, Utah, United States
SBP	KSBP	San Luis Obispo County Regional Airport (McChesney Field)	San Luis Obispo, California, United States
SBQ	OPSB	Sibi Airport	Sibi, Pakistan
SBR	YSII	Saibai Island Airport	Saibai Island, Queensland, Australia
SBS	KSBS	Steamboat Springs Airport (Bob Adams Field)	Steamboat Springs, Colorado, United States
SBT	USDA	Sabetta International Airport	Sabetta, Yamalo-Nenets Autonomous Okrug, Russia
SBU	FASB	Springbok Airport	Springbok, South Africa
SBV	AYSH	Sabah Airport	Sabah, Papua New Guinea
SBW	WBGS	Sibu Airport	Sibu, Sarawak, Malaysia
SBX	KSBX	Shelby Airport	Shelby, Montana, United States
SBY	KSBY	Salisbury–Ocean City–Wicomico Regional Airport	Salisbury / Ocean City, Maryland, United States
SBZ	LRSB	Sibiu International Airport	Sibiu, Romania
-SC-
SCA		Santa Catalina Airport	Santa Catalina, Colombia
SCB	KSCB	Scribner State Airport	Scribner, Nebraska, United States
SCC	PASC	Deadhorse Airport	Prudhoe Bay / Deadhorse, Alaska, United States
SCD	MHUL	Sulaco Airport	Sulaco, Honduras
SCE	KUNV	State College Regional Airport (FAA: UNV)	State College, Pennsylvania, United States
SCF	KSDL	Scottsdale Airport (FAA: SDL)	Phoenix / Scottsdale, Arizona, United States
SCG	YSPK	Spring Creek Airport	Conjuboy, Queensland, Australia
SCH	KSCH	Schenectady County Airport	Schenectady, New York, United States
SCI	SVPM	Paramillo Airport	San Cristóbal, Venezuela
SCK	KSCK	Stockton Metropolitan Airport	Stockton, California, United States
SCL	SCEL	Arturo Merino Benítez International Airport	Santiago, Chile
SCM	PACM	Scammon Bay Airport	Scammon Bay, Alaska, United States
SCN	EDDR	Saarbrücken Airport	Saarbrücken, Saarland, Germany
SCO	UATE	Aktau Airport	Aktau, Kazakhstan
SCP	LFNC	Mont-Dauphin - Saint-Crépin Airport	Mont-Dauphin, Provence-Alpes-Côte d'Azur, France
SCQ	LEST	Santiago de Compostela Airport	Santiago de Compostela, Galicia, Spain
SCR		Scandinavian Mountains Airport	Malung-Sälen, Sweden
SCS	EGPM	Scatsta Airport	Shetland Islands, Scotland, United Kingdom
SCT	OYSQ	Socotra Airport	Socotra, Yemen
SCU	MUCU	Antonio Maceo International Airport	Santiago de Cuba, Cuba
SCV	LRSV	Suceava International Airport (Ștefan cel Mare Int'l)	Suceava, Romania
SCW	UUYY	Syktyvkar Airport	Syktyvkar, Komi Republic, Russia
SCX	MMSZ	Salina Cruz Airport	Salina Cruz, Oaxaca, Mexico
SCY	SEST	San Cristóbal Airport	San Cristóbal Island, Galápagos Islands, Ecuador
SCZ	AGGL	Santa Cruz/Graciosa Bay/Luova Airport	Santa Cruz Islands, Solomon Islands
-SD-
SDB	FALW	Air Force Base Langebaanweg	Saldanha Bay, South Africa
SDC		Sand Creek Airport	Sand Creek Village, Guyana
SDD	FNUB	Lubango Mukanka Airport	Lubango, Angola
SDE	SANE	Vicecomodoro Ángel de la Paz Aragonés Airport	Santiago del Estero, Santiago del Estero, Argentina
SDF	KSDF	Louisville International Airport (Standiford Field)	Louisville, Kentucky, United States
SDG	OICS	Sanandaj Airport	Sanandaj, Iran
SDH	MHSR	Santa Rosa de Copán Airport	Santa Rosa de Copán, Honduras
SDI	AYSD	Saidor Airport	Saidor, Papua New Guinea
SDJ	RJSS	Sendai Airport	Sendai, Honshu, Japan
SDK	WBKS	Sandakan Airport	Sandakan, Sabah, Malaysia
SDL	ESNN	Sundsvall-Timrå Airport (Midlanda Airport)	Sundsvall / Härnösand, Sweden
SDM	KSDM	Brown Field Municipal Airport	San Diego, California, United States
SDN	ENSD	Sandane Airport, Anda	Sandane, Norway
SDP	PASD	Sand Point Airport	Sand Point, Alaska, United States
SDQ	MDSD	Las Américas International Airport	Santo Domingo, Dominican Republic
SDR	LEXJ	Santander Airport	Santander, Cantabria, Spain
SDS	RJSD	Sado Airport	Sado, Niigata, Japan
SDT	OPSS	Saidu Sharif Airport	Saidu Sharif, Pakistan
SDU	SBRJ	Santos Dumont Airport	Rio de Janeiro, Rio de Janeiro, Brazil
SDV	LLSD	Sde Dov Airport	Tel Aviv, Israel
SDW	VOSR	Sindhudurg Airport	Sindhudurg, Maharashtra, India
SDX	KSEZ	Sedona Airport (FAA: SEZ)	Sedona, Arizona, United States
SDY	KSDY	Sidney–Richland Municipal Airport	Sidney, Montana, United States
SDZ		metropolitan area^{2}	Shetland Islands, Scotland, United Kingdom
-SE-
SEA	KSEA	Seattle–Tacoma International Airport	Seattle, Washington, United States
SEB	HLLS	Sabha Airport	Sabha (Sebha), Libya
SED		Sdom Airfield (Hashnayim Airfield)	Neve Zohar (Sedom), Israel
SEE	KSEE	Gillespie Field	San Diego, California, United States
SEF	KSEF	Sebring Regional Airport	Sebring, Florida, United States
SEG	KSEG	Penn Valley Airport	Selinsgrove, Pennsylvania, United States
SEH	WAJS	Senggeh Airport	Senggeh, Indonesia
SEK	UESK	Srednekolymsk Airport	Srednekolymsk, Yakutia, Russia
SEL		metropolitan area^{3}	Seoul, South Korea
SEM	KSEM	Craig Field	Selma, Alabama, United States
SEN	EGMC	London Southend Airport	London / Southend, England, United Kingdom
SEO	DISG	Séguéla Airport	Séguéla, Ivory Coast
SEP	KSEP	Stephenville Clark Regional Airport	Stephenville, Texas, United States
SEQ	WIBS	Sei Pakning Airport	Bengkalis, Indonesia
SER	KSER	Freeman Municipal Airport	Seymour, Indiana, United States
SEU	HTSN	Seronera Airstrip	Seronera, Tanzania
SEV		Severodonetsk Airport	Severodonetsk, Ukraine
SEW		Siwa Oasis North Airport	Siwa Oasis, Egypt
SEY	GQNS	Sélibaby Airport	Sélibaby, Mauritania
SEZ	FSIA	Seychelles International Airport	Mahé, Seychelles
-SF-
SFA	DTTX	Sfax–Thyna International Airport	Sfax, Tunisia
SFB	KSFB	Orlando Sanford International Airport	Orlando, Florida, United States
SFC	TFFC	Saint-François Airport	Saint-François, Guadeloupe
SFD	SVSR	Las Flecheras Airport	San Fernando de Apure, Venezuela
SFE	RPUS	San Fernando Airport	San Fernando, Philippines
SFF	KSFF	Felts Field	Spokane, Washington, United States
SFG	TFFG	L'Espérance Airport (Grand Case Airport)	Grand Case, Saint Martin
SFH	MMSF	San Felipe International Airport	San Felipe, Baja California, Mexico
SFI	GMMS	Safi Airport	Safi, Morocco
SFJ	BGSF	Kangerlussuaq Airport	Kangerlussuaq, Greenland
SFK	SNSW	Soure Airport	Soure, Pará, Brazil
SFL	GVSF	São Filipe Airport	São Filipe, Fogo, Cape Verde
SFM	KSFM	Sanford Seacoast Regional Airport	Sanford, Maine, United States
SFN	SAAV	Sauce Viejo Airport	Santa Fe de la Vera Cruz, Santa Fe, Argentina
SFO	KSFO	San Francisco International Airport	San Francisco, California, United States
SFQ	LTCH	Şanlıurfa Airport	Şanlıurfa, Turkey
SFS	RPLB	Subic Bay International Airport	Subic Bay, Philippines
SFT	ESNS	Skellefteå Airport	Skellefteå, Sweden
SFU		Safia Airport	Safia, Papua New Guinea
SFV		Santa Fé do Sul Airport	Santa Fé do Sul, São Paulo, Brazil
SFX		Macagua Airport	San Félix, Venezuela
SFY		metropolitan area^{4}	Springfield, Massachusetts, United States
SFZ	KSFZ	North Central State Airport	Pawtucket, Rhode Island, United States
-SG-
SGA	OASN	Sheghnan Airport	Shighnan, Afghanistan
SGB		Singaua Airport	Singaua, Papua New Guinea
SGC	USRR	Farman Salmanov Surgut Airport	Surgut, Khanty-Mansi Autonomous Okrug, Russia
SGD	EKSB	Sønderborg Airport	Sønderborg, Denmark
SGE	EDGS	Siegerland Airport	Siegen, North Rhine-Westphalia, Germany
SGF	KSGF	Springfield–Branson National Airport	Springfield, Missouri, United States
SGG	WBGY	Simanggang Airport	Sri Aman, Malaysia
SGH	KSGH	Springfield–Beckley Municipal Airport	Springfield, Ohio, United States
SGI		metropolitan area^{1}	Sargodha, Sargodha, Pakistan
SGJ		Sagarai Airport	Sagarai, Papua New Guinea
SGK	AYSK	Sangapi Airport	Sangapi, Papua New Guinea
SGL	RPLS	Sangley Point Airport	Manila, Philippines
SGM		San Ignacio Airfield	San Ignacio, Baja California Sur, Mexico
SGN	VVTS	Tan Son Nhat International Airport	Ho Chi Minh City, Vietnam
SGO	YSGE	St George Airport	St George, Queensland, Australia
SGP	YSHG	Shay Gap Airport	Shay Gap, Western Australia, Australia
SGQ	WRLA	Sangkimah Airport	Sangatta, Indonesia
SGR	KSGR	Sugar Land Regional Airport	Houston / Sugar Land, Texas, United States
SGT	KSGT	Stuttgart Municipal Airport	Stuttgart, Arkansas, United States
SGU	KSGU	St. George Regional Airport	St. George, Utah, United States
SGV	SAVS	Sierra Grande Airport	Sierra Grande, Río Negro, Argentina
SGW		Saginaw Seaplane Base (FAA: A23)	Saginaw Bay, Alaska, United States
SGX	HTSO	Songea Airport	Songea, Tanzania
SGY	PAGY	Skagway Airport	Skagway, Alaska, United States
SGZ	VTSH	Songkhla Airport	Songkhla, Thailand
-SH-
SHA	ZSSS	Shanghai Hongqiao International Airport	Shanghai, China
SHB	RJCN	Nakashibetsu Airport	Nakashibetsu, Hokkaido, Japan
SHC		Shire Airport	Shire (Inda Selassie), Ethiopia
SHD	KSHD	Shenandoah Valley Regional Airport	Staunton / Waynesboro / Harrisonburg, Virginia, United States
SHE	ZYTX	Shenyang Taoxian International Airport	Shenyang, Liaoning, China
SHF	ZWHZ	Shihezi Huayuan Airport	Shihezi, Xinjiang, China
SHG	PAHG	Shungnak Airport	Shungnak, Alaska, United States
SHH	PASH	Shishmaref Airport	Shishmaref, Alaska, United States
SHI	RORS	Shimojishima Airport	Shimoji-shima, Miyako Islands, Japan
SHJ	OMSJ	Sharjah International Airport	Sharjah, United Arab Emirates
SHK	FXSH	Sehonghong Airport	Sehonghong, Lesotho
SHL	VEBI	Shillong Airport (Barapani Airport)	Shillong, Meghalaya, India
SHM	RJBD	Nanki–Shirahama Airport	Shirahama, Honshu, Japan
SHN	KSHN	Sanderson Field	Shelton, Washington, United States
SHO	FDSK	King Mswati III International Airport (Sikhuphe Int'l)	Manzini, Eswatini
SHQ	YSPT	Southport Airport	Southport, Queensland, Australia
SHR	KSHR	Sheridan County Airport	Sheridan, Wyoming, United States
SHS	ZHSS	Shashi Airport	Jingzhou, Hubei, China
SHT	YSHT	Shepparton Airport	Shepparton, Victoria, Australia
SHU	YSMP	Smith Point Airport	Smith Point, Northern Territory, Australia
SHV	KSHV	Shreveport Regional Airport	Shreveport, Louisiana, United States
SHW	OESH	Sharurah Domestic Airport	Sharurah, Saudi Arabia
SHX	PAHX	Shageluk Airport	Shageluk, Alaska, United States
SHY	HTSY	Shinyanga Airport	Shinyanga, Tanzania
SHZ	FXSS	Seshutes Airport	Seshote, Lesotho
-SI-
SIA	ZLSN	Xi'an Xiguan Airport	Xi'an, Shaanxi, China
SIB	FCBS	Sibiti Airport	Sibiti, Republic of the Congo
SIC		San José Airport	San José Island, Panama
SID	GVAC	Amílcar Cabral International Airport	Sal, Cape Verde
SIE	LPSI	Sines Airport	Sines, Portugal
SIF	VNSI	Simara Airport	Simara, Nepal
SIG	TJIG	Fernando Luis Ribas Dominicci Airport	San Juan, Puerto Rico
SIH	VNDT	Silgadhi Airport	Dipayal Silgadhi, Nepal
SII	GMMF	Sidi Ifni Airport (Sania Ramel Airport)	Sidi Ifni, Morocco
SIJ	BISI	Siglufjörður Airport	Siglufjörður, Iceland
SIK	KSIK	Sikeston Memorial Municipal Airport	Sikeston, Missouri, United States
SIL	AYSG	Sila Airport	Sila, Papua New Guinea
SIM	AYSJ	Simbai Airport	Simbai, Papua New Guinea
SIN	WSSS	Singapore Changi Airport	Singapore
SIO	YSMI	Smithton Airport	Smithton, Tasmania, Australia
SIP	UKFF	Simferopol International Airport	Simferopol
SIQ	WIDS	Dabo Singkep Airport	Singkep, Indonesia
SIR	LSGS	Sion Airport	Sion, Switzerland
SIS	FASS	Sishen Airport	Dingleton, South Africa
SIT	PASI	Sitka Rocky Gutierrez Airport	Sitka, Alaska, United States
SIU	MNSI	Siuna Airport	Siuna, Nicaragua
SIV	KSIV	Sullivan County Airport	Sullivan, Indiana, United States
SIW	WIMP	Sibisa Airport	Parapat, Indonesia
SIX	YSGT	Singleton Airport	Singleton, New South Wales, Australia
SIY	KSIY	Siskiyou County Airport	Montague / Yreka, California, United States
SIZ	AYZN	Sissano Airport	Sissano, Papua New Guinea
-SJ-
SJA	SPJN	San Juan de Marcona Airport	San Juan de Marcona, Peru
SJB	SLJO	San Joaquín Airport	San Joaquín, Bolivia
SJC	KSJC	San Jose International Airport	San Jose, California, United States
SJD	MMSD	Los Cabos International Airport	San José del Cabo, Baja California Sur, Mexico
SJE	SKSJ	Jorge Enrique González Torres Airport	San José del Guaviare, Colombia
SJF		Cruz Bay Seaplane Base	Saint John, United States Virgin Islands
SJG		San Pedro de Jagua Airport	San Pedro de Jagua, Colombia
SJH		San Juan del Cesar Airport	San Juan del Cesar, Colombia
SJI	RPUH	San Jose Airport	San Jose, Philippines
SJJ	LQSA	Sarajevo International Airport	Sarajevo, Bosnia and Herzegovina
SJK	SBSJ	Professor Urbano Ernesto Stumpf Airport	São José dos Campos, São Paulo, Brazil
SJL	SBUA	São Gabriel da Cachoeira Airport	São Gabriel da Cachoeira, Amazonas, Brazil
SJM	MDSJ	San Juan de la Maguana Airport	San Juan de la Maguana, Dominican Republic
SJN	KSJN	St. Johns Industrial Air Park	St. Johns, Arizona, United States
SJO	MROC	Juan Santamaría International Airport	San José, Costa Rica
SJP	SBSR	Prof. Eribelto Manoel Reino State Airport	São José do Rio Preto, São Paulo, Brazil
SJQ	FLSS	Sesheke Airport	Sesheke, Zambia
SJR		San Juan de Urabá Airport	San Juan de Urabá, Colombia
SJS	SLJE	San José de Chiquitos Airport	San José de Chiquitos, Bolivia
SJT	KSJT	San Angelo Regional Airport (Mathis Field)	San Angelo, Texas, United States
SJU	TJSJ	Luis Muñoz Marín International Airport	San Juan, Puerto Rico
SJV	SLJV	San Javier Airport	San Javier, Bolivia
SJW	ZBSJ	Shijiazhuang Zhengding International Airport	Shijiazhuang, Hebei, China
SJX	MZSJ	Sarteneja Airport	Sarteneja, Belize
SJY	EFSI	Seinäjoki Airport	Seinäjoki, Finland
SJZ	LPSJ	São Jorge Airport	São Jorge Island, Azores, Portugal
-SK-
SKA	KSKA	Fairchild Air Force Base	Spokane, Washington, United States
SKB	TKPK	Robert L. Bradshaw International Airport	Saint Kitts, Saint Kitts and Nevis
SKC	AYSU	Suki Airport	Suki, Papua New Guinea
SKD	UTSS	Samarkand International Airport	Samarkand, Uzbekistan
SKE	ENSN	Skien Airport, Geiteryggen	Skien, Norway
SKF	KSKF	Kelly Field Annex / Lackland Air Force Base	San Antonio, Texas, United States
SKG	LGTS	Thessaloniki Airport "Makedonia"	Thessaloniki, Greece
SKH	VNSK	Surkhet Airport	Surkhet, Nepal
SKI	DABP	Skikda Airport	Skikda, Algeria
SKJ	WIOD	Singkawang Airport	Singkawang, Indonesia
SKK	PFSH	Shaktoolik Airport (FAA: 2C7)	Shaktoolik, Alaska, United States
SKL	EGEI	Broadford Airfield	Isle of Skye, Scotland, United Kingdom
SKM		Skeldon Airport	Skeldon, Guyana
SKN	ENSK	Stokmarknes Airport, Skagen	Stokmarknes, Norway
SKO	DNSO	Sadiq Abubakar III International Airport	Sokoto, Nigeria
SKP	LWSK	Skopje "Alexander the Great" Airport	Skopje, North Macedonia
SKQ	FXSK	Sekake Airport	Sekake, Lesotho
SKR	HASK	Shakiso Airport	Shakiso, Ethiopia
SKS	EKSP	Vojens Airport (Skrydstrup Airport)	Vojens, Denmark
SKT	OPST	Sialkot International Airport	Sialkot, Pakistan
SKU	LGSY	Skyros Island National Airport	Skyros, Greece
SKV	HESC	St. Catherine International Airport	Saint Catherine, Egypt
SKW	PASW	Skwentna Airport	Skwentna, Alaska, United States
SKX	UWPS	Saransk Airport	Saransk, Mordovia, Russia
SKY	KSKY	Griffing Sandusky Airport	Sandusky, Ohio, United States
SKZ	OPSK	Sukkur Airport	Sukkur, Pakistan
-SL-
SLA	SASA	Martín Miguel de Güemes International Airport	Salta, Salta, Argentina
SLB	KSLB	Storm Lake Municipal Airport	Storm Lake, Iowa, United States
SLC	KSLC	Salt Lake City International Airport	Salt Lake City, Utah, United States
SLD	LZSL	Sliač Airport	Sliač, Slovakia
SLE	KSLE	McNary Field	Salem, Oregon, United States
SLF	OESL	Sulayel Airport	As Sulayyil (Sulayel), Saudi Arabia
SLG	KSLG	Smith Field	Siloam Springs, Arkansas, United States
SLH	NVSC	Vanua Lava Airport	Sola, Vanua Lava, Vanuatu
SLI	FLSW	Solwezi Airport	Solwezi, Zambia
SLJ	YSOL	Solomon Airport	Karijini National Park, Western Australia, Australia
SLK	KSLK	Adirondack Regional Airport	Saranac Lake, New York, United States
SLL	OOSA	Salalah International Airport	Salalah, Oman
SLM	LESA	Salamanca Airport	Salamanca, Castile and León, Spain
SLN	KSLN	Salina Regional Airport	Salina, Kansas, United States
SLO	KSLO	Salem–Leckrone Airport	Salem, Illinois, United States
SLP	MMSP	Ponciano Arriaga International Airport	San Luis Potosí City, San Luis Potosí, Mexico
SLQ	PASL	Sleetmute Airport	Sleetmute, Alaska, United States
SLR	KSLR	Sulphur Springs Municipal Airport	Sulphur Springs, Texas, United States
SLS	LBSS	Silistra Airfield	Silistra, Bulgaria
SLT	KANK	Harriet Alexander Field (FAA: ANK)	Salida, Colorado, United States
SLU	TLPC	George F. L. Charles Airport	Castries, Saint Lucia
SLV	VISM	Shimla Airport	Simla, Himachal Pradesh, India
SLW	MMIO	Plan de Guadalupe International Airport	Saltillo, Coahuila, Mexico
SLX	MBSY	Salt Cay Airport	Salt Cay, British Overseas Territory of Turks and Caicos Islands
SLY	USDD	Salekhard Airport	Salekhard, Yamalo-Nenets Autonomous Okrug, Russia
SLZ	SBSL	Marechal Cunha Machado International Airport	São Luís, Maranhão, Brazil
-SM-
SMA	LPAZ	Santa Maria Airport	Santa Maria Island, Azores, Portugal
SMB	SCSB	Franco Bianco Airport	Cerro Sombrero, Chile
SMC		Santa María Airport	Santa María, Colombia
SMD	KSMD	Smith Field	Fort Wayne, Indiana, United States
SME	KSME	Lake Cumberland Regional Airport	Somerset, Kentucky, United States
SMF	KSMF	Sacramento International Airport	Sacramento, California, United States
SMG	SPMR	Santa María Airport	Santa María del Mar, Peru
SMH	AYSP	Sapmanga Airport	Sapmanga, Papua New Guinea
SMI	LGSM	Samos International Airport "Aristarchos of Samos"	Samos, Greece
SMJ		Sim Airport	Sim, Papua New Guinea
SMK	PAMK	St. Michael Airport	St. Michael, Alaska, United States
SML	MYLS	Stella Maris Airport	Stella Maris, Long Island, Bahamas
SMM	WBKA	Semporna Airport	Semporna, Sabah, Malaysia
SMN	KSMN	Lemhi County Airport	Salmon, Idaho, United States
SMO	KSMO	Santa Monica Municipal Airport	Santa Monica, California, United States
SMP		Stockholm Airport	Stockholm, Papua New Guinea
SMQ	WAOS	H. Asan Airport	Sampit, Indonesia
SMR	SKSM	Simón Bolívar International Airport	Santa Marta, Colombia
SMS	FMMS	Sainte Marie Airport	Île Sainte-Marie, Madagascar
SMU	PASP	Sheep Mountain Airport	Sheep Mountain, Alaska, United States
SMV	LSZS	Samedan Airport (Engadin Airport)	St. Moritz, Switzerland
SMW	GMMA	Smara Airport	Smara, Morocco
SMX	KSMX	Santa Maria Public Airport (Capt. G. Allan Hancock Field)	Santa Maria, California, United States
SMY	GOTS	Simenti Airport	Simenti, Senegal
SMZ	SMST	Stoelmans Eiland Airstrip	Stoelmans Eiland (Stoelmanseiland), Suriname
-SN-
SNA	KSNA	John Wayne Airport (Orange County Airport)	Santa Ana, California, United States
SNB	YSNB	Snake Bay Airport	Milikapiti, Northern Territory, Australia
SNC	SESA	General Ulpiano Paez Airport	Salinas, Ecuador
SNE	GVSN	Preguiça Airport	São Nicolau, Cape Verde
SNF	SVSP	Sub Teniente Nestor Arias Airport	San Felipe, Venezuela
SNG	SLSI	Capitán Av. Juan Cochamanidis Airport	San Ignacio de Velasco, Bolivia
SNH	YSPE	Stanthorpe Airport	Stanthorpe, Queensland, Australia
SNI	GLGE	Greenville/Sinoe Airport (R.E. Murray Airport)	Greenville, Liberia
SNJ	MUSJ	San Julián Air Base	Guane, Cuba
SNK	KSNK	Winston Field Airport	Snyder, Texas, United States
SNL	KSNL	Shawnee Regional Airport	Shawnee, Oklahoma, United States
SNM	SLSM	San Ignacio de Moxos Airport	San Ignacio de Moxos, Bolivia
SNN	EINN	Shannon Airport	Shannon, Ireland
SNO	VTUI	Sakon Nakhon Airport	Sakon Nakhon, Thailand
SNP	PASN	St. Paul Island Airport	St. Paul Island, Alaska, United States
SNQ		San Quintín Military Airstrip	San Quintín, Baja California, Mexico
SNR	LFRZ	Saint-Nazaire Montoir Airport	Saint-Nazaire, Pays de la Loire, France
SNS	KSNS	Salinas Municipal Airport	Salinas, California, United States
SNT	SKRU	Las Cruces Airport	Sabana de Torres, Colombia
SNU	MUSC	Abel Santamaría Airport	Santa Clara, Cuba
SNV	SVSE	Santa Elena de Uairén Airport	Santa Elena de Uairén, Venezuela
SNW	VYTD	Thandwe Airport	Thandwe, Myanmar
SNX	OIIS	Semnan Municipal Airport	Semnan, Iran
SNY	KSNY	Sidney Municipal Airport (Lloyd W. Carr Field)	Sidney, Nebraska, United States
SNZ	SBSC	Santa Cruz Air Force Base	Rio de Janeiro, Rio de Janeiro, Brazil
-SO-
SOA		Sóc Trăng Airfield	Sóc Trăng, Vietnam
SOB	LHSM	Hévíz–Balaton Airport	Hévíz, Hungary
SOC	WARQ	Adisumarmo International Airport	Surakarta (Solo), Indonesia
SOD	SDCO	Bertram Luiz Leupolz–Sorocaba Airport	Sorocaba, São Paulo, Brazil
SOE	FCOS	Souanké Airport	Souanké, Republic of the Congo
SOF	LBSF	Vasil Levski Sofia Airport	Sofia, Bulgaria
SOG	ENSG	Sogndal Airport, Haukåsen	Sogndal, Norway
SOJ	ENSR	Sørkjosen Airport	Sørkjosen, Norway
SOK	FXSM	Semonkong Airport	Semonkong, Lesotho
SOL		Solomon State Field Airport (FAA: AK26)	Solomon, Alaska, United States
SOM	SVST	San Tomé Airport	San Tomé, Venezuela
SON	NVSS	Santo-Pekoa International Airport	Luganville, Vanuatu
SOO	ESNY	Söderhamn Airport (Helsinge Airport)	Söderhamn, Sweden
SOP	KSOP	Moore County Airport	Pinehurst / Southern Pines, North Carolina, United States
SOQ	WASS	Dominique Edward Osok Airport	Sorong, Indonesia
SOT	EFSO	Sodankylä Airfield	Sodankylä, Finland
SOU	EGHI	Southampton Airport	Southampton, England, United Kingdom
SOV	PASO	Seldovia Airport	Seldovia, Alaska, United States
SOW	KSOW	Show Low Regional Airport	Show Low, Arizona, United States
SOX	SKSO	Alberto Lleras Camargo Airport	Sogamoso, Colombia
SOY	EGER	Stronsay Airport	Stronsay, Scotland, United Kingdom
SOZ	LFKS	Solenzara Air Base	Sari-Solenzara, Corsica, France
-SP-
SPA	KSPA	Spartanburg Downtown Memorial Airport	Spartanburg, South Carolina, United States
SPB		Charlotte Amalie Harbor Seaplane Base (St. Thomas Seaplane Base) (FAA: VI22)	St. Thomas Island, United States Virgin Islands
SPC	GCLA	La Palma Airport	La Palma, Canary Islands, Spain
SPD	VGSD	Saidpur Airport	Saidpur, Bangladesh
SPE	WBKO	Sepulot Airport	Sapulut, Sabah, Malaysia
SPF	KSPF	Black Hills Airport (Clyde Ice Field)	Spearfish, South Dakota, United States
SPG	KSPG	Albert Whitted Airport	St. Petersburg, Florida, United States
SPH	AYQO	Sopu Airport	Sopu, Papua New Guinea
SPI	KSPI	Abraham Lincoln Capital Airport	Springfield, Illinois, United States
SPJ	LGSP	Sparti Airport	Sparti (Sparta), Greece
SPK		metropolitan area^{5}	Sapporo, Hokkaido, Japan
SPM	ETAD	Spangdahlem Air Base	Spangdahlem, Rhineland-Palatinate, Germany
SPN	PGSN	Saipan International Airport (Francisco C. Ada Int'l) (FAA: GSN)	Saipan, Northern Mariana Islands
SPP	FNME	Menongue Airport	Menongue, Angola
SPR	MZSP	John Greif II Airport	San Pedro Town, Belize
SPS	KSPS	Wichita Falls Municipal Airport	Wichita Falls, Texas, United States
SPT		Sipitang Airstrip	Sipitang, Sabah, Malaysia
SPU	LDSP	Split Airport	Split, Croatia
SPV		Sepik Plains Airport	Sepik Plains, Papua New Guinea
SPW	KSPW	Spencer Municipal Airport	Spencer, Iowa, United States
SPY	DISP	San Pédro Airport	San-Pédro, Ivory Coast
SPX		Sphinx International Airport	Egypt, Egypt
SPZ	KASG	Springdale Municipal Airport (FAA: ASG)	Springdale, Arkansas, United States
-SQ-
SQA	KIZA	Santa Ynez Airport (FAA: IZA)	Santa Ynez, California, United States
SQB		Santa Ana Airport	Piedras, Colombia
SQC	YSCR	Southern Cross Airport	Southern Cross, Western Australia, Australia
SQD	ZSSR	Shangrao Sanqingshan Airport	Shangrao, Jiangxi, China
SQE		San Luis de Palenque Airport	San Luis de Palenque, Colombia
SQG	WIOS	Tebelian Airport (Susilo Airport)	Sintang, Indonesia
SQH	VVNS	Nà Sản Airport	Sơn La, Vietnam
SQI	KSQI	Whiteside County Airport (Jos. H. Bittorf Field)	Sterling / Rock Falls, Illinois, United States
SQJ		Sanming Shaxian Airport	Sanming, Fujian, China
SQK		Sidi Barrani Airport	Sidi Barrani, Egypt
SQL	KSQL	San Carlos Airport	San Carlos, California, United States
SQM	SWUA	São Miguel do Araguaia Airport	São Miguel do Araguaia, Goiás, Brazil
SQN	WAPN	Sanana Airport	Sanana Island, Indonesia
SQO	ESUD	Storuman Airport	Storuman, Sweden
SQQ	EYSA	Šiauliai International Airport	Šiauliai, Lithuania
SQR	WAWS	Soroako Airport	Soroako, Indonesia
SQS		Matthew Spain Airport	San Ignacio, Belize
SQT		China Strait Airstrip	Samarai, Papua New Guinea
SQU	SPOA	Saposoa Airport	Saposoa, Peru
SQV		Sequim Valley Airport (FAA: W28)	Sequim, Washington, United States
SQW	EKSV	Skive Airport	Skive, Denmark
SQX	SSOE	Hélio Wasum Airport	São Miguel do Oeste, Santa Catarina, Brazil
SQY	SSRU	São Lourenço do Sul Airport	São Lourenço do Sul, Rio Grande do Sul, Brazil
SQZ	EGXP	RAF Scampton	Scampton, England, United Kingdom
-SR-
SRA	SSZR	Santa Rosa Airport	Santa Rosa, Rio Grande do Sul, Brazil
SRB	SLSR	Santa Rosa Airport	Santa Rosa de Yacuma, Bolivia
SRC	KSRC	Searcy Municipal Airport	Searcy, Arkansas, United States
SRD	SLRA	San Ramón Airport	San Ramón, Bolivia
SRE	SLAL	Alcantarí Airport	Sucre, Bolivia
SRF		San Rafael Airport (Hamilton Field)	San Rafael, California, United States
SRG	WARS	Achmad Yani International Airport	Semarang, Indonesia
SRH	FTTA	Sarh Airport	Sarh, Chad
SRI	~~WALS~~	Temindung Airport	Samarinda, Indonesia
SRJ	SLSB	Capitán Germán Quiroga Guardia Airport	San Borja, Bolivia
SRL		Palo Verde Airport	Santa Rosalía, Baja California Sur, Mexico
SRM		Sandringham Station Airport	Sandringham Station, Queensland, Australia
SRN	YSRN	Strahan Airport	Strahan, Tasmania, Australia
SRO		Santana Ramos Airport	Santana Ramos, Colombia
SRP	ENSA	Stord Airport, Sørstokken	Stord, Norway
SRQ	KSRQ	Sarasota–Bradenton International Airport	Sarasota / Bradenton, Florida, United States
SRR		Dunwich Airport	North Stradbroke Island, Queensland, Australia
SRS		San Marcos Airport	San Marcos, Colombia
SRT	HUSO	Soroti Airport	Soroti, Uganda
SRV		Stony River Airport	Stony River, Alaska, United States
SRW	KRUQ	Rowan County Airport (FAA: RUQ)	Salisbury, North Carolina, United States
SRX	HLGD	Gardabya Airport	Sirte, Libya
SRY	OINZ	Dasht-e Naz Airport	Sari, Iran
SRZ	SLET	El Trompillo Airport	Santa Cruz de la Sierra, Bolivia
-SS-
SSA	SBSV	Deputado Luís Eduardo Magalhães International Airport	Salvador, Bahia, Brazil
SSB		Christiansted Harbor Seaplane Base (St. Croix Seaplane Base) (FAA: VI32)	Saint Croix, United States Virgin Islands
SSC	KSSC	Shaw Air Force Base	Sumter, South Carolina, United States
SSD		San Felipe Airport	San Felipe, Colombia
SSE	VASL	Solapur Airport	Solapur, Maharashtra, India
SSF	KSSF	Stinson Municipal Airport	San Antonio, Texas, United States
SSG	FGSL	Malabo International Airport (Saint Isabel Airport)	Malabo, Equatorial Guinea
SSH	HESH	Sharm el-Sheikh International Airport	Sharm el-Sheikh, Egypt
SSI	KSSI	Malcolm McKinnon Airport	Brunswick, Georgia, United States
SSJ	ENST	Sandnessjøen Airport, Stokka	Sandnessjøen, Norway
SSK		Sturt Creek Airport	Sturt Creek, Western Australia, Australia
SSL	SKSL	Santa Rosalía Airport	Santa Rosalía, Colombia
SSN	RKSM	Seoul Air Base	Seoul, South Korea
SSO	SNLO	São Lourenço Airport	São Lourenço, Minas Gerais, Brazil
SSP		Silver Plains Airport	Silver Plains, Queensland, Australia
SSQ		La Sarre Airport (TC: CSR8)	La Sarre, Quebec, Canada
SSR	NVSH	Sara Airport	Sara, Vanuatu
SSS		Siassi Airport	Umboi Island (Siassi), Papua New Guinea
SST	SAZL	Santa Teresita Airport	Santa Teresita, Buenos Aires, Argentina
SSV		Siasi Airport	Siasi, Philippines
SSW		Stuart Island Airpark (FAA: 7WA5)	Stuart Island, Washington, United States
SSY	FNBC	Mbanza Congo Airport	M'banza-Kongo, Angola
SSZ	SBST	Santos Air Force Base	Santos, São Paulo, Brazil
-ST-
STA	EKVJ	Stauning Vestjylland Airport	Skjern, Denmark
STB	SVSZ	Miguel Urdaneta Fernández Airport	Santa Bárbara del Zulia, Venezuela
STC	KSTC	St. Cloud Regional Airport	St. Cloud, Minnesota, United States
STD	SVSO	Mayor Buenaventura Vivas Airport	Santo Domingo, Táchira, Venezuela
STE	KSTE	Stevens Point Municipal Airport	Stevens Point, Wisconsin, United States
STF	YSTI	Stephens Island Airport	Stephens Island, Queensland, Australia
STG	PAPB	St. George Airport (FAA: PBV)	St. George, Alaska, United States
STH	YSMR	Strathmore Airport	Strathmore Station, Queensland, Australia
STI	MDST	Cibao International Airport	Santiago de los Caballeros, Dominican Republic
STJ	KSTJ	Rosecrans Memorial Airport	St. Joseph, Missouri, United States
STK	KSTK	Sterling Municipal Airport	Sterling, Colorado, United States
STL	KSTL	Lambert–St. Louis International Airport	St. Louis, Missouri, United States
STM	SBSN	Santarém-Maestro Wilson Fonseca Airport	Santarém, Pará, Brazil
STN	EGSS	London Stansted Airport	London, England, United Kingdom
STO	ESSA	metropolitan area^{6}	Stockholm, Sweden
STP	KSTP	St. Paul Downtown Airport (Holman Field)	St. Paul / Minneapolis, Minnesota, United States
STQ	KOYM	St. Marys Municipal Airport (FAA: OYM)	St. Marys, Pennsylvania, United States
STR	EDDS	Stuttgart Airport	Stuttgart, Baden-Württemberg, Germany
STS	KSTS	Charles M. Schulz–Sonoma County Airport	Santa Rosa, California, United States
STT	TIST	Cyril E. King Airport	St. Thomas Island, United States Virgin Islands
STV	VASU	Surat Airport	Surat, Gujarat, India
STW	URMT	Stavropol Shpakovskoye Airport	Stavropol, Stavropol Krai, Russia
STX	TISX	Henry E. Rohlsen Airport	Saint Croix, United States Virgin Islands
STY	SUSO	Nueva Hespérides International Airport	Salto, Uruguay
STZ	SWST	Santa Terezinha Airport	Santa Terezinha, Mato Grosso, Brazil
-SU-
SUA	KSUA	Witham Field	Stuart, Florida, United States
SUB	WARR	Juanda International Airport	Surabaya, Indonesia
SUD	KSUD	Stroud Municipal Airport	Stroud, Oklahoma, United States
SUE	KSUE	Door County Cherryland Airport	Sturgeon Bay, Wisconsin, United States
SUF	LICA	Lamezia Terme International Airport	Lamezia Terme, Calabria, Italy
SUG	RPMS	Surigao Airport	Surigao City, Philippines
SUH	OOSR	Sur Airport	Sur, Oman
SUI	UGSS	Sukhumi Babushara Airport (Dranda Airport)	Sukhumi, Georgia
SUJ	LRSM	Satu Mare International Airport	Satu Mare, Romania
SUK	UEBS	Sakkyryr Airport	Batagay-Alyta (Sakkyryr), Yakutia, Russia
SUL	OPSU	Sui Airport	Sui, Pakistan
SUM	KSMS	Sumter Airport (FAA: SMS)	Sumter, South Carolina, United States
SUN	KSUN	Friedman Memorial Airport	Hailey / Sun Valley, Idaho, United States
SUO		Sunriver Airport (FAA: S21)	Sunriver, Oregon, United States
SUP	WART	Trunojoyo Airport	Sumenep, Indonesia
SUQ	SESC	Sucúa Airport	Sucúa, Ecuador
SUR		Summer Beaver Airport (TC: CJV7)	Summer Beaver, Ontario, Canada
SUS	KSUS	Spirit of St. Louis Airport	St. Louis, Missouri, United States
SUT	HTSU	Sumbawanga Airport	Sumbawanga, Tanzania
SUU	KSUU	Travis Air Force Base	Fairfield, California, United States
SUV	NFNA	Nausori International Airport	Suva, Fiji
SUW	KSUW	Richard I. Bong Airport	Superior, Wisconsin, United States
SUX	KSUX	Sioux Gateway Airport (Colonel Bud Day Field)	Sioux City, Iowa, United States
SUY	UENS	Suntar Airport	Suntar, Yakutia, Russia
SUZ		Suria Airport	Suria, Papua New Guinea
-SV-
SVA	PASA	Savoonga Airport	Savoonga, Alaska, United States
SVB	FMNS	Sambava Airport	Sambava, Madagascar
SVC	KSVC	Grant County Airport	Silver City, New Mexico, United States
SVD	TVSA	Argyle International Airport	Saint Vincent, Saint Vincent and the Grenadines
SVE	KSVE	Susanville Municipal Airport	Susanville, California, United States
SVF	DBBS	Savé Airport	Savé, Benin
SVG	ENZV	Stavanger Airport, Sola	Stavanger, Norway
SVH	KSVH	Statesville Regional Airport	Statesville, North Carolina, United States
SVI	SKSV	Eduardo Falla Solano Airport	San Vicente del Caguán, Colombia
SVJ	ENSH	Svolvær Airport, Helle	Svolvær, Norway
SVK	MZKT	Silver Creek Airport	Silver Creek, Belize
SVL	EFSA	Savonlinna Airport	Savonlinna, Finland
SVM		St Pauls Airport	St Pauls, Queensland, Australia
SVN	KSVN	Hunter Army Airfield	Savannah, Georgia, United States
SVO	UUEE	Sheremetyevo International Airport	Moscow, Russia
SVP	FNKU	Kuito Airport	Kuito, Angola
SVQ	LEZL	Seville Airport	Seville, Andalusia, Spain
SVS		Stevens Village Airport	Stevens Village, Alaska, United States
SVT	FBSV	Savuti Airport	Savuti, Botswana
SVU	NFNS	Savusavu Airport	Savusavu, Fiji
SVW	PASV	Sparrevohn LRRS Airport	Sparrevohn, Alaska, United States
SVX	USSS	Koltsovo International Airport	Yekaterinburg, Sverdlovsk Oblast, Russia
SVY		Savo Airport	Savo Island, Solomon Islands
SVZ	SVSA	Juan Vicente Gómez International Airport	San Antonio del Táchira, Venezuela
-SW-
SWA	ZGOW	Jieyang Chaoshan International Airport	Shantou / Jieyang / Chaozhou, Guangdong, China
SWB		Shaw River Airport	Shaw River, Western Australia, Australia
SWC	YSWL	Stawell Airport	Stawell, Victoria, Australia
SWD	PAWD	Seward Airport	Seward, Alaska, United States
SWE		Siwea Airport	Siwea, Papua New Guinea
SWF	KSWF	Stewart International Airport	Newburgh, New York, United States
SWG		Satwag Airport	Satwag, Papua New Guinea
SWH	YSWH	Swan Hill Airport	Swan Hill, Victoria, Australia
SWJ	NVSX	South West Bay Airport	South West Bay, Vanuatu
SWL	RPSV	San Vicente Airport	San Vicente, Palawan, Philippines
SWM		Suia-Missu Airport	Alto Boa Vista, Mato Grosso, Brazil
SWN	VISP	Sarsawa Airport	Saharanpur, Uttar Pradesh, India
SWO	KSWO	Stillwater Regional Airport	Stillwater, Oklahoma, United States
SWP	FYSM	Swakopmund Airport	Swakopmund, Namibia
SWQ	WADS	Sultan Muhammad Kaharuddin III Airport (Brangbiji Airport)	Sumbawa Besar, Indonesia
SWR		Silur Airport	Silur, Papua New Guinea
SWS	EGFH	Swansea Airport	Swansea, Wales, United Kingdom
SWT	UNSS	Strezhevoy Airport	Strezhevoy, Tomsk Oblast, Russia
SWU	RKSW	Suwon Air Base	Suwon, South Korea
SWV	UHMW	Severo-Evensk Airport	Evensk, Magadan Oblast, Russia
SWW	KSWW	Avenger Field	Sweetwater, Texas, United States
SWX	FBSW	Shakawe Airport	Shakawe, Botswana
SWY	WMBA	Sitiawan Airport	Sitiawan, Perak, Malaysia
-SX-
SXA		Sialum Airport	Sialum, Papua New Guinea
SXB	LFST	Strasbourg Airport	Strasbourg, Alsace, France
SXE	YWSL	West Sale Airport	Sale, Victoria, Australia
SXG	FLSN	Senanga Airport	Senanga, Zambia
SXH		Sehulea Airport	Sehulea, Papua New Guinea
SXI	OIBS	Sirri Island Airport	Sirri Island, Iran
SXJ	ZWSS	Shanshan Airport	Shanshan, Xinjiang, China
SXK	WAPI	Saumlaki Airport (Olilit Airport)	Saumlaki, Indonesia
SXL	EISG	Sligo Airport	Sligo, Ireland
SXM	TNCM	Princess Juliana International Airport	Sint Maarten, Kingdom of the Netherlands
SXN	FBSN	Sua Pan Airport	Sua Pan, Botswana
SXO	SWFX	São Félix do Araguaia Airport	São Félix do Araguaia, Mato Grosso, Brazil
SXP		Sheldon Point Airport	Nunam Iqua, Alaska, United States
SXQ	PASX	Soldotna Airport	Soldotna, Alaska, United States
SXR	VISR	Sheikh ul-Alam International Airport	Srinagar, Jammu and Kashmir, India
SXS	WBKH	Sahabat Airport	Sahabat, Sabah, Malaysia
SXT	WMAN	Sungai Tiang Airport	Taman Negara, Pahang, Malaysia
SXU	HASD	Soddu Airport	Sodo, Ethiopia
SXV	VOSM	Salem Airport	Salem, Tamil Nadu, India
SXW		Sauren Airport	Sauren, Papua New Guinea
SXX	SNFX	São Félix do Xingu Airport	São Félix do Xingu, Pará, Brazil
SXY		Sidney Municipal Airport (FAA: N23)	Sidney, New York, United States
SXZ	LTCL	Siirt Airport	Siirt, Turkey
-SY-
SYA	PASY	Eareckson Air Station	Shemya, Alaska, United States
SYB		Seal Bay Seaplane Base	Seal Bay, Alaska, United States
SYC	SPSY	Shiringayoc Airport	Shiringayoc, Peru
SYD	YSSY	Sydney Airport (Kingsford Smith Airport)	Sydney, New South Wales, Australia
SYE	OYSH	Saadah Airport	Sa'dah, Yemen
SYF		Silva Bay Seaplane Base	Gabriola Island, British Columbia, Canada
SYI	KSYI	Shelbyville Municipal Airport (Bomar Field)	Shelbyville, Tennessee, United States
SYJ	OIKY	Sirjan Airport	Sirjan, Iran
SYK	BIST	Stykkishólmur Airport	Stykkishólmur, Iceland
SYM	ZPSM	Pu'er Simao Airport	Simao, Yunnan, China
SYN	KSYN	Stanton Airfield	Stanton, Minnesota, United States
SYO	RJSY	Shonai Airport	Shōnai, Honshu, Japan
SYP	MPSA	Ruben Cantu Airport	Santiago de Veraguas, Panama
SYQ	MRPV	Tobías Bolaños International Airport	San José, Costa Rica
SYR	KSYR	Syracuse Hancock International Airport	Syracuse, New York, United States
SYS	UERS	Saskylakh Airport	Saskylakh, Yakutia, Russia
SYT	LFLN	Saint-Yan Airport (Charolais Bourgogne Sud Airport)	Saint-Yan, Burgundy, France
SYU	YWBS	Warraber Island Airport	Sue Islet, Queensland, Australia
SYV	KSYV	Sylvester Airport	Sylvester, Georgia, United States
SYW	OPSN	Sehwan Sharif Airport	Sehwan Sharif, Pakistan
SYX	ZJSY	Sanya Phoenix International Airport	Sanya, Hainan, China
SYY	EGPO	Stornoway Airport	Stornoway, Scotland, United Kingdom
SYZ	OISS	Shiraz International Airport (Shahid Dastghaib Int'l)	Shiraz, Iran
-SZ-
SZA	FNSO	Soyo Airport	Soyo, Angola
SZB	WMSA	Sultan Abdul Aziz Shah Airport	Kuala Lumpur,^{7} Malaysia
SZD		Suzhou Railway Station North Square Bus Station	Suzhou, Jiangsu, China
SZE	HASM	Semera Airport	Semera, Ethiopia
SZF	LTFH	Samsun-Çarşamba Airport	Samsun, Turkey
SZG	LOWS	Salzburg Airport	Salzburg, Austria
SZI		Zaysan Airport	Zaysan, Kazakhstan
SZJ	MUSN	Siguanea Airport	Isla de la Juventud, Cuba
SZK	FASZ	Skukuza Airport	Skukuza, South Africa
SZL	KSZL	Whiteman Air Force Base	Knob Noster, Missouri, United States
SZM		Sesriem Airport	Sesriem, Namibia
SZN	KSZN	Santa Cruz Island Airport	Santa Cruz Island, California, United States
SZO		Suzhou City Air Terminal of Shanghai Airport	Suzhou, Jiangsu, China
SZP	KSZP	Santa Paula Airport	Santa Paula, California, United States
SZR	LBSZ	Stara Zagora Airport	Stara Zagora, Bulgaria
SZS	NZRC	Ryan's Creek Aerodrome	Stewart Island, New Zealand
SZU		Ségou Airport	Ségou, Mali
SZV	ZSSZ	Suzhou Guangfu Airport	Suzhou, Jiangsu, China
SZW	EDOP	Schwerin-Parchim International Airport	Schwerin, Mecklenburg-Vorpommern, Germany
SZX	ZGSZ	Shenzhen Bao'an International Airport	Shenzhen, Guangdong, China
SZY	EPSY	Olsztyn-Mazury Regional Airport	Szczytno / Olsztyn, Poland
SZZ	EPSC	"Solidarity" Szczecin–Goleniów Airport	Szczecin, Poland

== Notes ==
- ^1 SAO is common IATA code for São Paulo–Guarulhos International Airport (IATA: GRU), São Paulo–Congonhas Airport (IATA: CGH) and Viracopos/Campinas International Airport (IATA: VCP).
- ^2 SDZ is common IATA code for Sumburgh Airport (IATA: LSI), Tingwall Airport (IATA: LWK) and Scatsta Airport (IATA: SCS).
- ^3 SEL is common IATA code for Incheon International Airport (IATA: ICN), Gimpo International Airport (IATA: GMP) and Seoul Air Base (IATA: SSN).
- ^4 SFY is common IATA code for Bradley International Airport (IATA: BDL) and Westover Metropolitan Airport (IATA: CEF).
- ^5 SPK is common IATA code for New Chitose Airport (IATA: CTS) and Okadama Airport (IATA: OKD).
- ^6 STO is common IATA code for Stockholm Arlanda Airport (IATA: ARN), Stockholm Bromma Airport (IATA: BMA), Stockholm Skavsta Airport (IATA: NYO) and Stockholm Västerås Airport (IATA: VST).
- ^7 Airport is located in the Subang, Selangor state.
