= Sulaco =

Sulaco may refer to:

== Places ==
- Sulaco, Yoro, a municipality in Honduras
  - Sulaco Airport (IATA code: SCD, IATA code: MHUL), see List of airports by IATA code: S
- Sulaco River, a river in Honduras

=== Fictional locations ===
- Sulaco, Costaguana, a mining town in the 1904 Joseph Conrad novel Nostromo

== Vehicles ==
- SS Sulaco, a British cargo ship sunk in WWII, see List of shipwrecks in October 1940
- SS Sulaco, a cargo and passenger ship, final name of the USS Talamanca (AF-15)

=== Fictional vehicles ===
- U.S.S. Sulaco, a fictional spaceship shown in the movie Aliens
