= KSUD =

KSUD may refer to:

- Stroud Municipal Airport (ICAO code KSUD)
- KSUD-LD, a low-power television station (channel 33, virtual 33) licensed to serve Salt Lake City, Utah, United States
