= William Milnor Roberts =

American civil engineer (1810-1881)

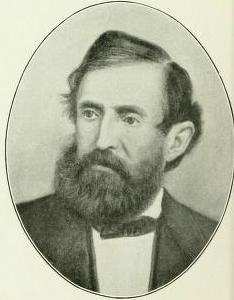
- Born: February 12, 1810; Philadelphia, Pennsylvania, US
- Died: July 14, 1881 (aged 71); Soledad, Brazil
- Education: Franklin Institute
- Occupation: Civil engineer

William Milnor Roberts (February 12, 1810 – July 14, 1881) was an American civil engineer. Roberts was one of the most prolific and prominent civil engineers of his generation in the United States. As a young civil engineer, he was involved in the construction of the Eads Bridge, held the title of the chief engineer of Northern Pacific Railroad, and was president of the American Society of Civil Engineers scarcely two decades after its founding,

== Early life and career ==
William was born to Thomas Paschall and Mary Louise (Baker) Roberts on February 12, 1810, in Philadelphia, Pennsylvania.

William was educated in private schools in Philadelphia. He spent two terms taking a special course in mathematics taught by Joseph Roberts, a prominent mathematician, and a course in architectural drawing under John Haviland at the Franklin Institute.

William pursued a career in civil engineering on the advice of Samuel Mifflin, the then president of the Union Canal Company of Pennsylvania and friend of his father. He took up employment at the Union Canal of Pennsylvania in the spring of 1825. At the age of 18, William was promoted to the head of the team in charge of the most difficult section of the Lehigh Canal. After beginning his career in engineering, William continued to further his education, focusing on mathematics.

== Career ==
Roberts served as an assistant in survey and construction at the Lehigh Canal, between Mauch Chunk, Pennsylvania, and Philadelphia. From 1831 to 1834 he served as the senior assistant engineer for the proposed Allegheny Portage Railroad, and general manager from 1834 to 1835. He was the chief engineer in Lancaster and Harrisburg in 1837. He was in charge of construction of a two-level lattice-truss bridge across the Susquehanna River at Harrisburg.

From 1834 to 1840 Roberts was in charge of extensions of the Pennsylvania Canals; Bellefontaine and Indiana, Allegheny Valley, Atlantic and Mississippi, and Iron Mountain. He was chairman of the Commission to Consider Reconstruction of Allegheny Portage and constructed railroads in the Middle West from 1855 to 1857. In 1865 Roberts was contracted to build the Don Pedro Segundo in Brazil. In 1866, William proposed improvements to the Mississippi River at Keokuk, Iowa.

Roberts served as associate chief engineer for the construction of the Eads Bridge across Mississippi River at St. Louis in 1868. In 1869 to 1879 he served as engineer-in-chief of the Northern Pacific Railroad (NP). In 1878 and 1879, William led the survey party that explored the cascade mountain passes for route location.

Roberts was elected as a member to the American Philosophical Society in 1876. From 1879 to 1881 Roberts served as a member of the Mississippi River Jetty Commission and chief engineer, all public works in Brazil. From 1873 to 1878 Roberts served as vice-president of the American Society of Civil Engineers. In 1878 he served as president of the American Society of Civil Engineers.

== Family ==
William married Annie Gibson in June 1837. They had six children together, including his son Milnor Roberts. Anne died in 1857. William later married Adeline de Beelen-Bertholff in November 1868 and the couple had four children.

== Death ==
William died of typhoid fever in Soledad, Brazil, on July 14, 1881.

== Legacy ==
Milnor, North Dakota, was named after several individuals associated with the NP railroad, William Edward Milnor, the first telegrapher at the NP's Milnor Station, and Roberts, the chief engineer of the railroad. In 1923, the engineering building on the Montana State College campus was named in his honor. Roberts' papers are now held by the Montana State University Archives and Special Collections.

== Works ==
- Cumberland Valley Railroad Company, & Roberts, W. M. (1835). Report of William Milnor Roberts, chief engineer of the Cumberland Valley Rail Road Company, made to the Board, on the 23d Oct., 1835. Philadelphia: J.C. Clark, printer.
- Harrisburg, Portsmouth, Mount Joy, and Lancaster Railroad Company., & Roberts, W. M. (1836). Report of the chief engineer to the president and directors of the Harrisburg and Lancaster Rail Road Company. Middletown, Pa: Harrisburg and Lancaster Railroad Company.
- Cumberland Valley Railroad Company. (1837). Second report of William Milnor Roberts chief engineer of the Cumberland valley rail road company, made to the Board, 29th December 1836. Chambersburg, Pa: Hickok & Blood. OCLC Number: 84618930 (Roberts also made a third report to the Board in 1837, see OCLC Number: 950908210
- Roberts, W. M., & Clark, J. C. (1838). Third annual report of W. Milnor Roberts, chief engineer of the Harrisburg and Lancaster Railroad Company: Made to the board, January 8th, 1838. Philadelphia: Printed by John C. Clark.
- Roberts, W. M. (1846). Report to the Board of directors: On the Sandy & Beaver Canal. New Lisbon, Ohio: J. Wilkinson, printer.
- Roberts, W. M., Columbia-Philadelphia Railroad., & Pennsylvania. (1848). Report of W. Milnor Roberts, Esq., (civil engineer,) on the survey of a route to avoid the Schuylkill inclined plane, on the Philadelphia and Columbia Railroad: Authorized by the act of the eleventh April, eighteen hundred and forty-eight, entitled "An act to provide for the ordinary expenses of government," &c. Philadelphia?: publisher not identified.
- Roberts, W. M. (1850). Report on the preliminary surveys for the Bellefontaine & Indiana rail road company. Pittsburgh, Pa.: Printed by Johnson & Stockton. See also for map of railroad
- Allegheny Valley Railroad Company., & Haven, W. S. (1853). Report on the surveys of the Allegheny Valley rail road: Read before the president and board, July 26, 1853. Pittsburg: Printed by W.S. Haven. OCLC Number: 10807508
- Roberts, W. M., Erie and North East Railroad Company., & Constitution Book and Job Office (Firm). (1856). Report relative to the surveys of routes for the Pittsburg and Erie rail road: Read at a meeting of the stockholders of the Erie and North East Rail Road Company at Erie, July 8, 1856. Erie, Penn: Printed at the Constitution Book and Job Office.
- Roberts, W. M. (1856). Improvement of the Ohio River. Pittsburgh: Published by order of the Board of Trade.
- Roberts, W. M., & Jay Cooke & Co. (1866). Report on the present state and prospects of the North Missouri Railroad: Upon examinations made for Messrs. Jay Cooke & Co. by W. Milnor Roberts, consulting engineer, June, 1866. Philadelphia: McLaughlin Bros.
- Roberts, W. M. (1868). Report of W. Milnor Roberts, consulting engineer, to the president and managers of the Erie Canal Company of Pennsylvania. Erie, Pa: Republican Print.
- Roberts, W. M., & Jay Cooke & Co. (1869).Special Report of a reconnoissance [sic] of the route for the Northern Pacific Railroad between Lake Superior and Puget Sound via the Columbia River, Philadelphia?: J. Cooke & Co.?.
- Roberts, W. M., Flad, H., & Whitman, T. J. (1869). Preliminary report with reference to extension of the new Pittsburgh Water Works.
- Northern Pacific Railroad Company., Roberts, W. M., & Joseph Meredith Toner Collection (Library of Congress). (1874). Report of the chief engineer on the unfinished portion of the Northern Pacific Railroad: Made to the president of the company, April 27, 1874. New York: Evening Post Steam Presses.
- Roberts, W. M., (1874), Engineering, Transactions of the American Society of Civil Engineers, 1874, Vol. II, Issue 1, Pg. 69-80
- Philadelphia (Pa.)., & Roberts, W. M. (1875). Report on the water supply for the city of Philadelphia: Made by the commission of engineers appointed by the mayor under the ordinance of councils, approved June 5, 1875. Philadelphia: E.C. Markley & Son, printers.
- Roberts, W. M., (1878) Reminiscences and experiences of Early Engineering Operations on Railroads, With Special Reference to Steep Inclines, Transactions of the American Society of Civil Engineers, 1878, Vol. VII, Issue 1, Pg. 197-215
- Relatorio de W. Milnor Roberts, engenheiro chefe da Commissão hydraulica sobre o exame do Rio S. Francisco: Desde o mar até a cachoeira de Pirapóra : extensão de 2.122 kilometros : feito em 1879-1880.Roberts, W. M., Roberts, W. M., Derby, O. A., & Sampaio, T. (1880), Rio de Janeiro: Typographia nacional.

== Bibliography ==
- Smalley, E. V. (1883). History of the Northern Pacific Railroad. New York: G.P. Putnam's Sons. *The National Cyclopedia of American Biography. (1940) New York: James T. White, p. 447.
- Nolan, E. W., & Roberts, W. M. (1971). Exploring the Northern Pacific Railroad route: W. Milnor Roberts' letters from the expedition of 1869. M.A. University of Oregon, OCLC Number:10282350
- Lubetkin, M. John. (2014) Jay Cooke's Gamble: The Northern Pacific Railroad, the Sioux, and the Panic of 1873. University of Oklahoma Press.
