= SXG =

SXG or sxg may refer to:

- SXG, the IATA code for Senanga Airport, Western Province, Zambia
- sxg, the ISO 639-3 code for Shixing language, Sichuan, China
