= SGQ =

SGQ can refer to:

- SaudiGulf Airlines, a defunct Saudi Arabian airline from 2013 to 2020, by ICAO code
- SouthGobi Resources, a Canadian coal mining company
- Sangkimah Airport, an airport in Sangatta, Indonesia; see List of airports by IATA airport code: S
- Shuangqing District, a district of Shaoyang, Hunan province, China; see List of administrative divisions of Hunan
- Société des designers graphiques du Québec, a Canadian professional association
