= CGJ =

CGJ may refer to:

- Combining grapheme joiner (CGJ, U+034F), a Unicode character that has no visible glyph, use to separate characters that should not form a digraph
- Kasompe Airport (IATA airport code CGJ), Chingola, Copperbelt Province, Zambia
