= SNK (disambiguation) =

SNK (formerly Shin Nihon Kikaku), a Japanese video game company and former electronic game manufacturer. This may also refer to:

- SNK European Democrats
- SNK Union of Independents
- Southeast Airlines ICAO code
- Winston Field Airport IATA code
- Slovenská národná knižnica, the Slovak National Library
- Sovnarkom, the Soviet Council of People's Commissars (Sovet Narodnykh Komissarov)
- The Student-Newman–Keuls method in statistics
- Soninke language (ISO 639-2 language code)
- Shingeki no Kyojin (Attack on Titan), Japanese manga series
