= SJQ =

SJQ or Sjq can refer to

- Sanshui District, an urban district in Foshan, Guangdong Province, China (division code SJQ)
- Sesheke Airport, Zambia (IATA code SJQ)
- "Spelljammer Quest" a Dungeons & Dragons module set in the Spelljammer campaign setting
- Surajpur Road railway station, Surajpur, Chhattisgarh, India. See List of railway stations in India § S
