= Milliken Airport =

Airport in Zambia

- IATA: none; ICAO: FLKW

Summary
- Airport type: Public
- Serves: Kabwe, Zambia
- Elevation AMSL: 3,920 ft / 1,195 m
- Coordinates: 14°27′00″S 28°22′45″E

Map
- Location of the airport in Zambia

Runways
Direction	Length		Surface
Direction	m	ft	Surface
11/29	1,100	3,609	Dirt
- Source: GCM Google Maps

Milliken Airport (ICAO: FLKW), also known as Chililalila Airstrip, is an airport serving Kabwe, a town in the Central Province of Zambia. The airport is on the west side of the town.

== See also ==
- Transport in Zambia
- List of airports in Zambia
