= Luanshya Airport =

Airport in Zambia

- IATA: none; ICAO: FLLA

Summary
- Airport type: Public
- Serves: Luanshya, Zambia
- Elevation AMSL: 4,100 ft / 1,250 m
- Coordinates: 13°08′30″S 28°25′30″E

Map
- Location of the airport in Zambia

Runways
Direction	Length		Surface
Direction	m	ft	Surface
09/27	461	1,512	Asphalt
- Source: GCM Google Maps

Luanshya Airport (ICAO: FLLA) is an airstrip serving Luanshya, a town in the Copperbelt Province of Zambia. The runway is within the city, and has an additional 65 metres (213 ft) dirt overrun on the east end, narrowing to an aligned dirt road of indeterminate length.

The Ndola VOR-DME (Ident: VND) is located 16.5 nautical miles (30.6 km) east-northeast of the runway.

== See also ==
- Transport in Zambia
- List of airports in Zambia
