= List of airports in Zambia =

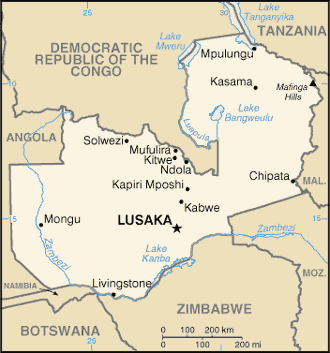
Map of Zambia

This is a list of airports in Zambia, sorted by location.

Zambia, officially the Republic of Zambia, is a landlocked country in Southern Africa. The neighboring countries are the Democratic Republic of the Congo to the north, Tanzania to the northeast, Malawi to the east, Mozambique, Zimbabwe, Botswana and Namibia to the south, and Angola to the west.

Zambia is divided into ten provinces. The capital city is Lusaka.

== Airports ==
Airport names shown in bold indicate the airport has scheduled service on commercial airlines.

City served	Province	ICAO	IATA	Airport name
Chingola	Copperbelt	FLKE	CGJ	Kasompe Airport
Chipata	Eastern	FLCP	CIP	Chipata Airport
Kabwe	Central	FLKW	QKE	Milliken Airport
Kalabo	Western	FLKL	KLB	Kalabo Airport
Kaoma	Western	FLKO	KMZ	Kaoma Airport
Kasaba Bay	Northern	FLKY	ZKB	Kasaba Bay Airport
Kasama	Northern	FLKS	KAA	**Kasama Airport**
Kitwe	Copperbelt	FLSO	KIW	Southdowns Airport
Livingstone	Southern	FLHN	LVI	**Harry Mwanga Nkumbula International Airport**
Luanshya	Copperbelt	FLLA		Luanshya Airport
Lukulu	Western	FLLK	LXU	Lukulu Airport
Lusaka	Lusaka	FLKK	LUN	**Kenneth Kaunda International Airport**
Lusaka	Lusaka	FLLC		Lusaka City Airport
Mansa	Luapula	FLMA	MNS	**Mansa Airport**
Mbala	Northern	FLBA	MMQ	Mbala Airport
Mfuwe	Eastern	FLMF	MFU	**Mfuwe Airport**
Mongu	Western	FLMG	MNR	Mongu Airport
Ndola	Copperbelt	FLSK	NLA	**Simon Mwansa Kapwepwe International Airport**
Ngoma	Southern	FLNA	ZGM	Ngoma Airport
Senanga	Western	FLSN	SXG	Senanga Airport
Sesheke	Western	FLSS	SJQ	Sesheke Airport
Solwezi	North-Western	FLSW	SLI	**Solwezi Airport**
Zambezi	North-Western	FLZB	BBZ	Zambezi Airport

== See also ==
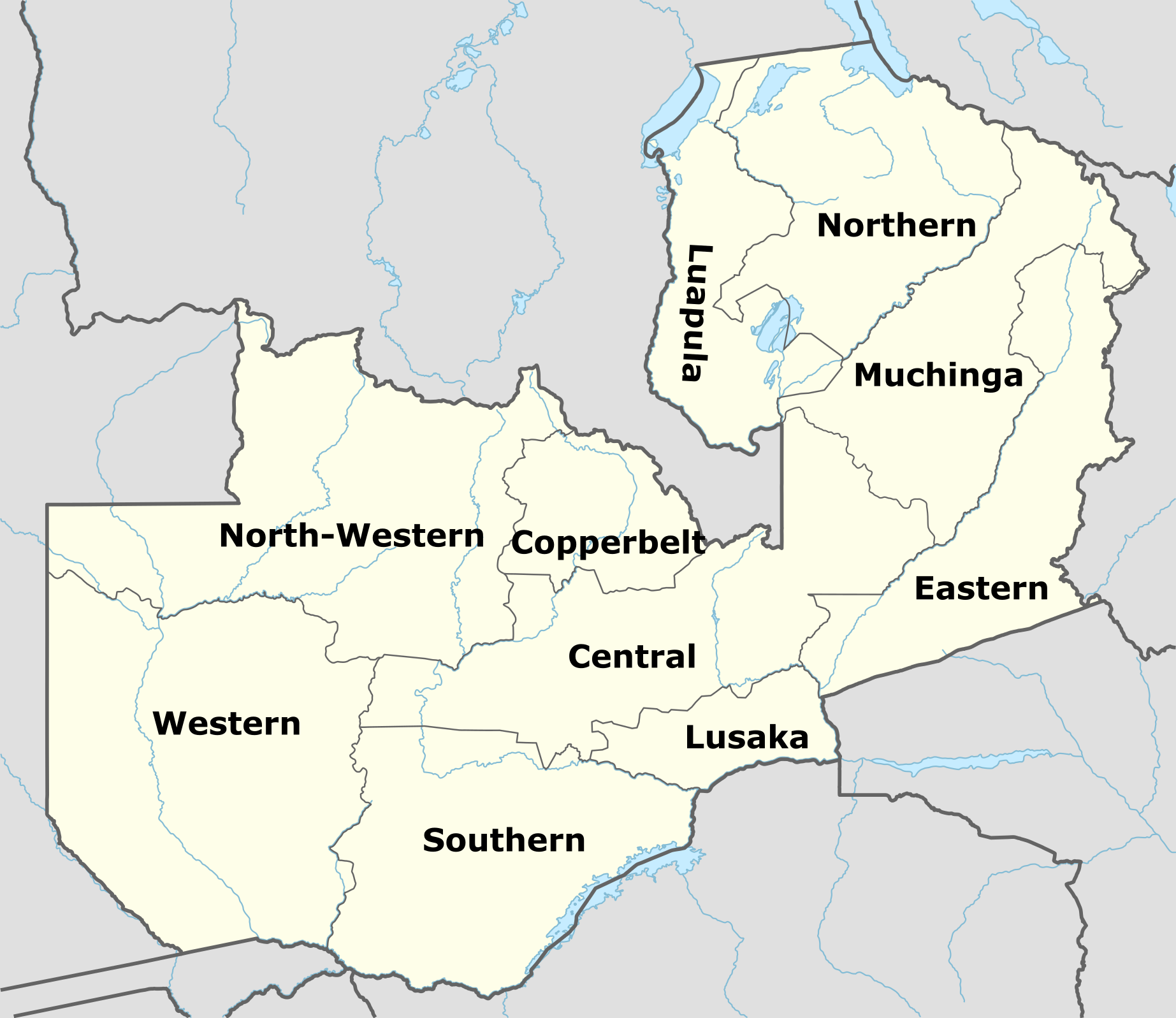
Map of Zambia's ten provinces

- Department of Civil Aviation of Zambia
- Transport in Zambia
- List of Zambian airports by ICAO code
- Wikipedia: WikiProject Aviation/Airline destination lists: Africa#Zambia
