= Department of Civil Aviation (Zambia) =

Civil aviation authority of Zambia

Agency overview
- Formed: 1954
- Jurisdiction: Government of Zambia
- Headquarters: Lusaka; 15°25′S 28°17′E
- Agency executive: Director; Deputy Director
- Parent department: Ministry of Transport, Works, Supply and Communication
- Website: www.dca.com.zm

Footnotes
- Sources: DCA

The Department of Civil Aviation of Zambia is the civil aviation authority of Zambia. It was initially established in 1954 by Federal Act 10 as a Directorate to oversee all aspects regarding civil aviation within the borders of the Federation of Rhodesia and Nyasaland, later split into Northern and Southern Rhodesia, and Nyasaland. Control of the body was transferred to the Republic of Zambia when Northern Rhodesia gained its independence in 1963.

It is presided by a director, who is seconded by a deputy director. It has its headquarters in Lusaka.

== See also ==
- List of airports in Zambia
- List of civil aviation authorities
