= São Lourenço, Minas Gerais =

São Lourenço
- Municipality
- Municipality of São Lourenço
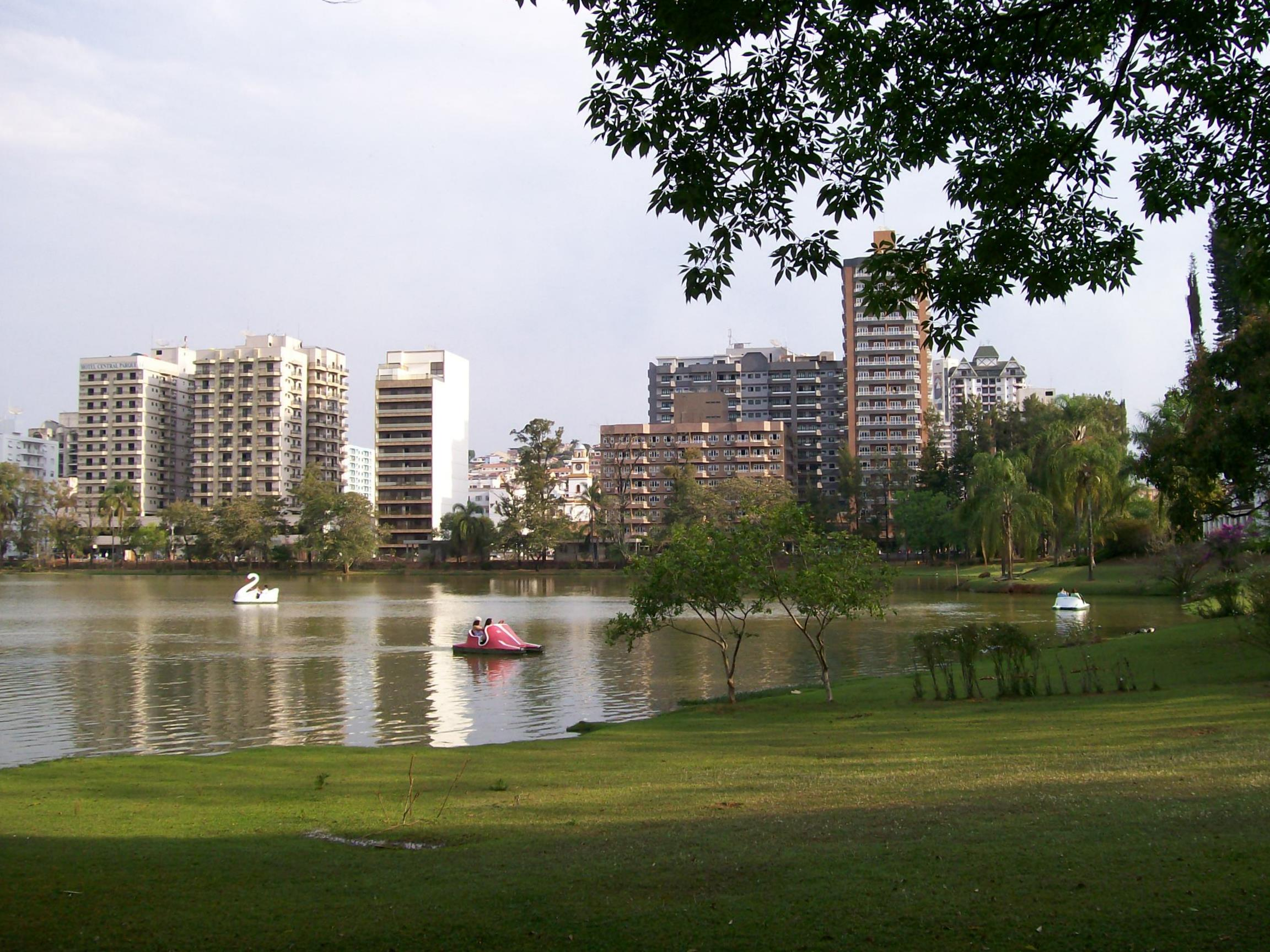
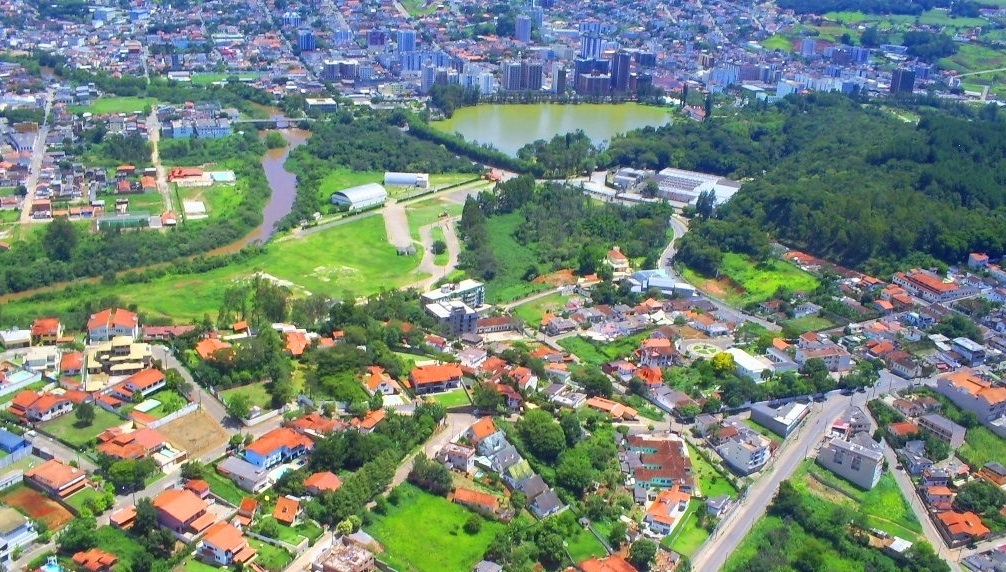
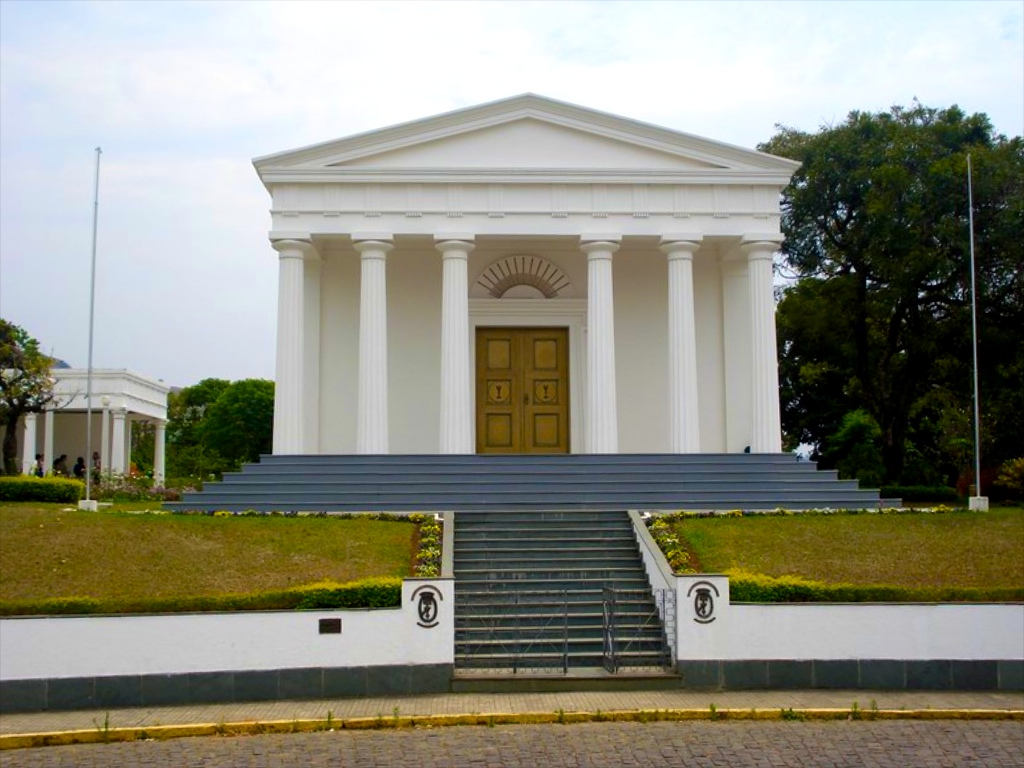
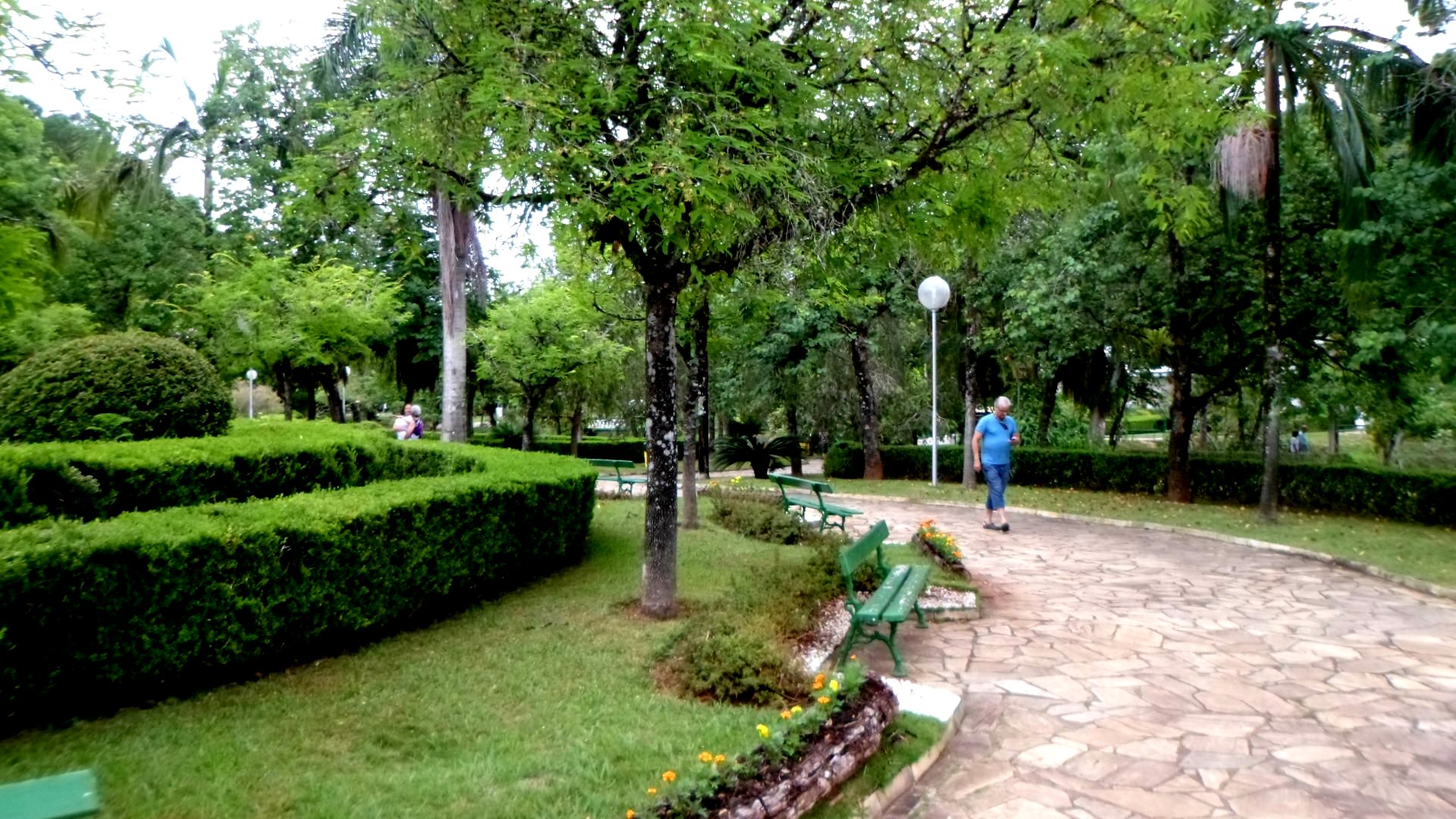
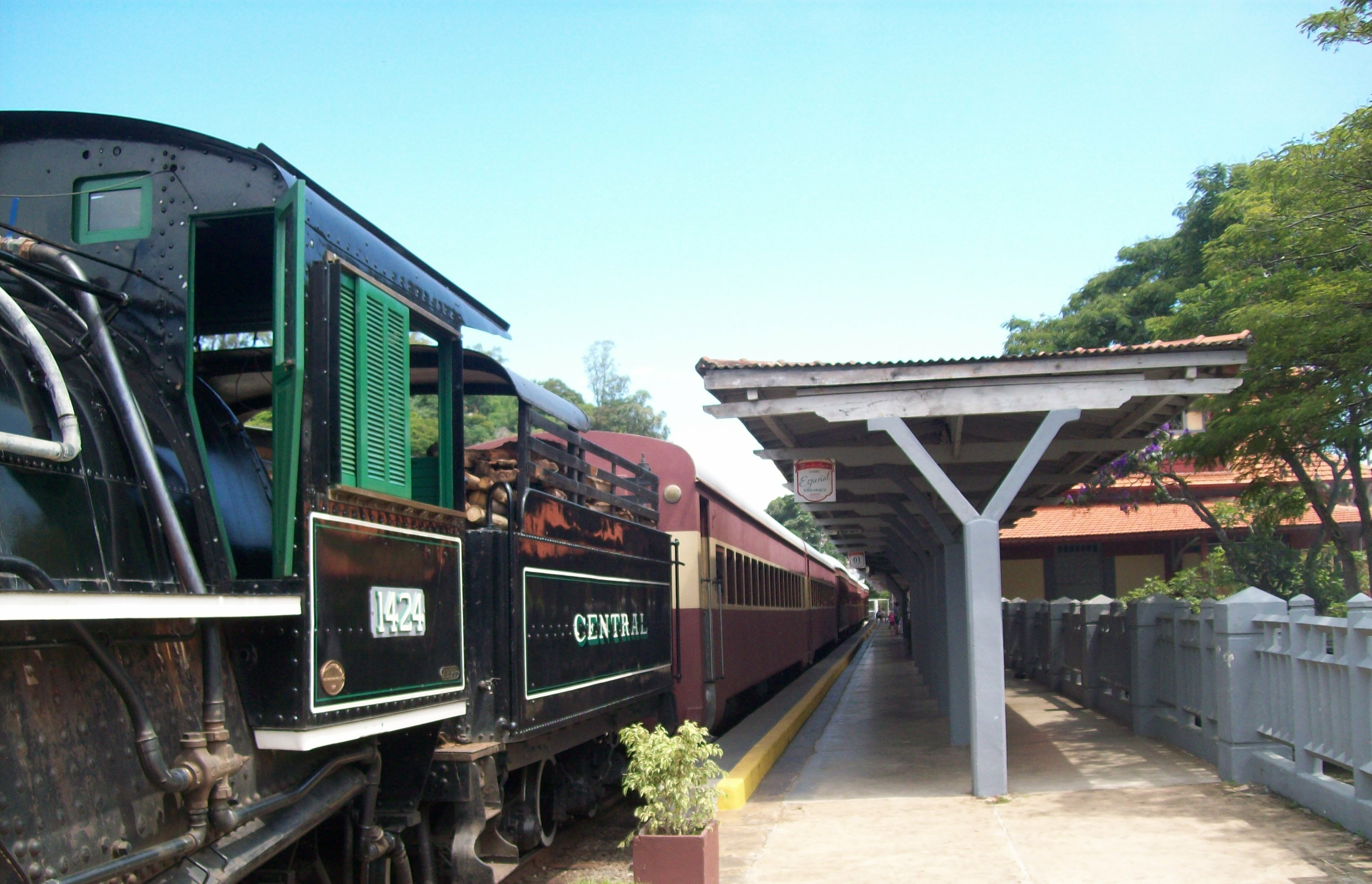
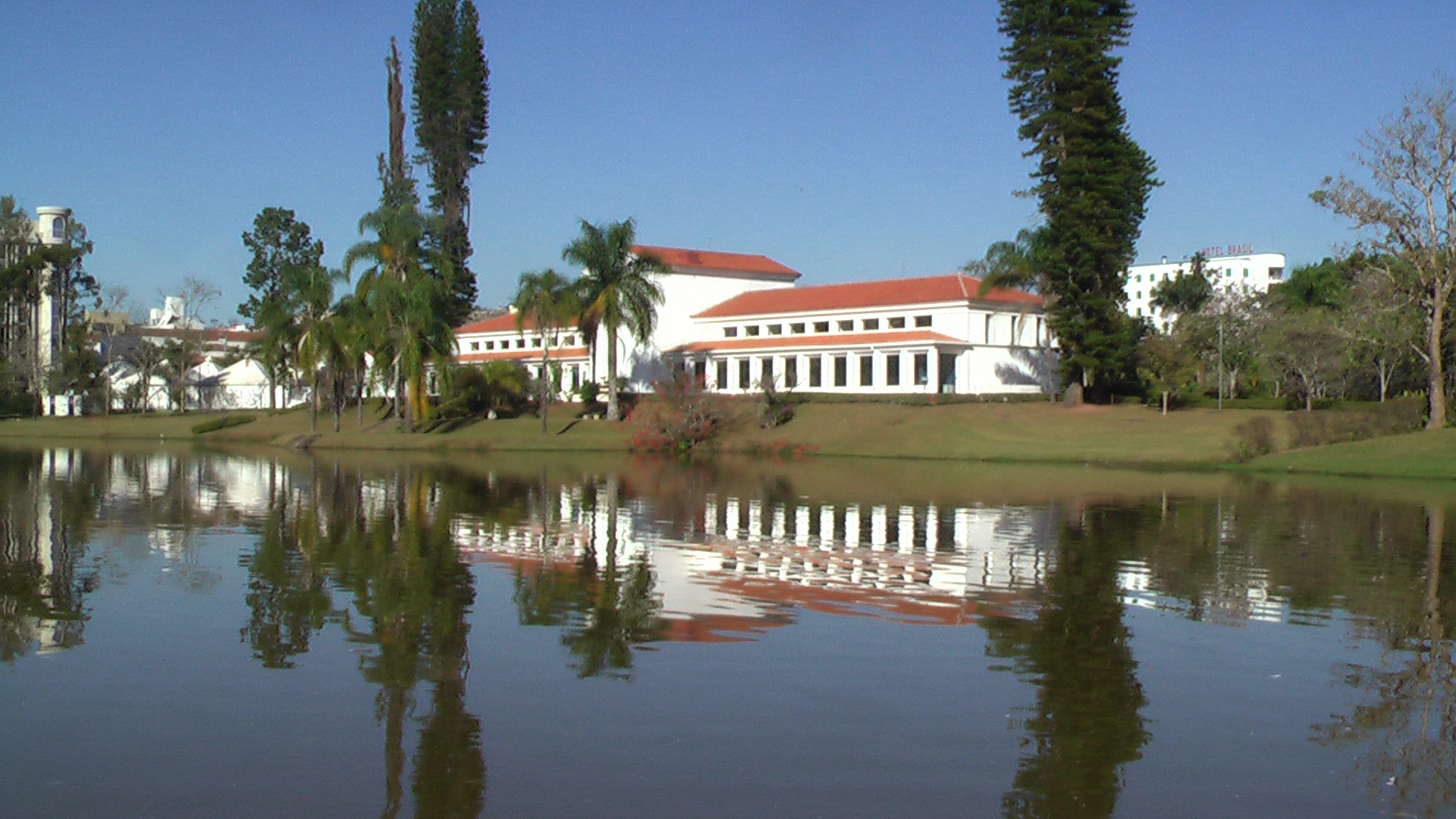
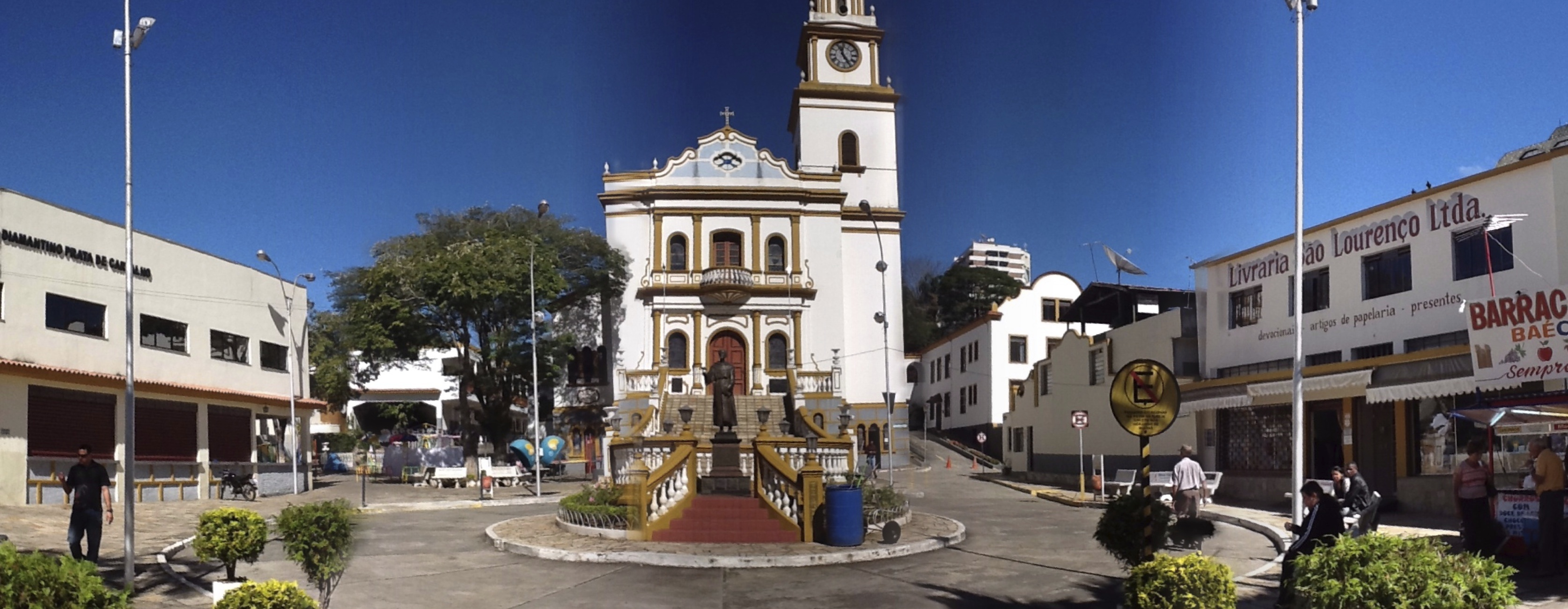

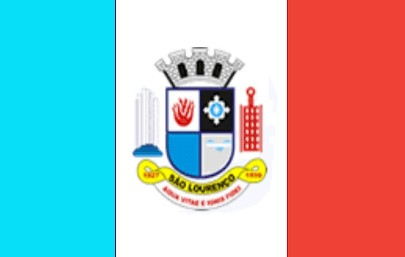
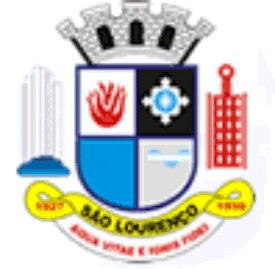
- Flag Coat of arms
- Motto: Acqua Vitæ Ignis Fidei
- Location in Brazil
- Coordinates: 22°06′57″S 45°03′14″W
- Country: Brazil
- Region: Southeast
- State: Minas Gerais
- Mesoregion: South and Southwest of Minas Gerais
- Microregion: São Lourenço
- Incorporated: September 20, 1927

Government
  - Mayor: Walter José Lessa (PSD)

Area
  - Total: 58.0 km^{2} (22.4 sq mi)
- Elevation: 875 m (2,871 ft)

Population (2022)
  - Total: 44,798
  - Density: 772.3/km^{2} (2,000/sq mi)
- Census
- Time zone: UTC−3 (BRT)
- Postal Code: 37470-000
- HDI (2010): 0.759 – high
- Website: saolourenco.mg.gov.br

São Lourenço is a Brazilian municipality and spa town located in the Mantiqueira Mountains in the southern part of the state of Minas Gerais, in the Southeast of the country. It is part of the Circuit of Waters of Minas Gerais. Its population was 44,798 as of the 2022 Census.

== History ==
=== Origins and the Viana Waters ===
The settlement of the region dates back to the early 19th century on lands owned by João Francisco Viana. According to local tradition, the therapeutic properties of the waters were discovered in 1826 by his son, Antonio Francisco Viana, who found a naturally carbonated spring on the "Bomba" farm.

The news of the medicinal virtues of the waters, popularly known as "Águas do Viana", attracted visitors seeking cures, leading to the early settlement along the banks of the Rio Verde. This flow was further increased in 1884 with the inauguration of the Minas and Rio Railway, which facilitated access for tourists and patients from the Imperial Court and other provinces.

=== Industrialization and the Veiga Family ===
In 1890, Comendador Bernardo Saturnino da Veiga acquired the spring properties. Together with his brothers, he founded the Companhia de Águas Minerais São Lourenço, which became the first company to bottle mineral water on an industrial scale in Latin America.

The settlement was renamed from "Viana" to "São Lourenço" in honor of the Comendador's father, Lieutenant Colonel Lourenço Xavier da Veiga. Under the company's management, the town underwent early sanitation works and the layout of the urban areas around what would become the Parque das Águas.

=== Administrative Evolution ===
The town was created as a district in 1891, originally linked to Silvestre Ferraz (now Carmo de Minas). In 1923, it was transferred to the jurisdiction of Pouso Alto. São Lourenço officially achieved emancipation and was elevated to the category of municipality on September 20, 1927.

=== The Art Deco Balneário ===
In the 1930s, the town underwent a modernization period. Between 1932 and 1935, the current Balneário (spa house) was constructed, designed by French architects Henri Sajous and Charles Hébrard. The building, built in the Art Deco style, established São Lourenço as a luxury destination for thermalism in Brazil, frequently visited by figures such as presidents Getúlio Vargas and Juscelino Kubitschek.

== Geography ==
São Lourenço is located in the South of Minas Gerais region of the Mantiqueira Mountains. The city center is at an altitude of 875 m. The highest point in the municipality is the Montanha Sagrada at 1,176 m, while the lowest point is along the banks of the Rio Verde at approximately 860 m.

=== Climate ===
São Lourenço has a humid subtropical climate (Köppen: Cwa) with rainy summers and warm, dry winters. The yearly mean temperature is 18 °C.

According to the National Institute of Meteorology (INMET), the lowest temperature recorded since 1931 was -3.3 °C on July 14, 1945, and the highest was 37.6 °C on September 25, 2023. The heaviest 24-hour rainfall recorded was 171 mm on January 3, 2000.

Climate data for São Lourenço, Minas Gerais (1991–2020)
Month	Jan	Feb	Mar	Apr	May	Jun	Jul	Aug	Sep	Oct	Nov	Dec	Year
Mean daily maximum °C (°F)	29.0 (84.2)	29.4 (84.9)	28.7 (83.7)	27.7 (81.9)	24.8 (76.6)	24.2 (75.6)	24.5 (76.1)	26.4 (79.5)	27.7 (81.9)	28.5 (83.3)	28.1 (82.6)	28.8 (83.8)	27.3 (81.1)
Daily mean °C (°F)	22.4 (72.3)	22.3 (72.1)	21.6 (70.9)	19.8 (67.6)	16.4 (61.5)	15.1 (59.2)	14.8 (58.6)	16.6 (61.9)	19.2 (66.6)	21.0 (69.8)	21.3 (70.3)	22.1 (71.8)	19.4 (66.9)
Mean daily minimum °C (°F)	17.7 (63.9)	17.3 (63.1)	16.6 (61.9)	14.1 (57.4)	10.5 (50.9)	8.5 (47.3)	7.7 (45.9)	8.7 (47.7)	12.2 (54.0)	15.0 (59.0)	16.2 (61.2)	17.3 (63.1)	13.5 (56.3)
Average precipitation mm (inches)	319.2 (12.57)	187.0 (7.36)	164.4 (6.47)	72.2 (2.84)	57.5 (2.26)	27.7 (1.09)	24.2 (0.95)	20.4 (0.80)	73.2 (2.88)	119.5 (4.70)	174.3 (6.86)	254.6 (10.02)	1,494.2 (58.83)
Average precipitation days (≥ 1.0 mm)	16.6	12.8	12.5	6.1	4.6	2.9	2.4	2.8	6.4	10.2	13.0	17.1	107.4
Average relative humidity (%)	78.4	77.7	78.8	77.5	79.5	80.2	75.7	68.3	66.2	70.2	74.5	77.8	75.4
Average dew point °C (°F)	19.1 (66.4)	18.9 (66.0)	18.5 (65.3)	16.9 (62.4)	14.1 (57.4)	12.7 (54.9)	11.9 (53.4)	12.2 (54.0)	14.0 (57.2)	16.2 (61.2)	17.3 (63.1)	18.7 (65.7)	15.9 (60.6)
Mean monthly sunshine hours	177.5	182.9	201.2	214.5	205.2	192.0	224.4	247.7	220.3	208.2	188.2	179.5	2,441.6
Source: NOAA

== Economy ==
Tourism and commerce are the main economic activities of the city. São Lourenço is a prominent spa town and a hub for the Circuit of Waters, specializing in the exploitation and commercialization of mineral waters. The local economy is driven by the service sector, particularly health tourism, leisure, and wellness.

The city is served by the Comte. Luiz Carlos de Oliveira Airport. Additionally, the town's railway station serves the tourist Trem das Águas, operated by the ABPF. This railway uses steam locomotives (popularly known as Maria-fumaça) to connect São Lourenço to Soledade de Minas.

== Culture ==
Throughout the year, several events take place in São Lourenço, including the International Choir Festival, Cachaça Festival, Winter Festival, Street Carnaval, Orchid Exhibits, and gatherings for classic cars and hot air balloons.

In early August, the city celebrates its patron saint, Saint Lawrence, with a ten-day festival featuring live music, traditional food, and fireworks.

== See also ==
- List of municipalities in Minas Gerais
