= Mongu Airport =

Airport in Zambia

- IATA: MNR; ICAO: FLMG

Summary
- Airport type: Public
- Serves: Mongu, Zambia
- Elevation AMSL: 3,488 ft (1,063 m)
- Coordinates: 15°15′18″S 23°09′45″E

Map
- Location of airport in Zambia

Runways
Direction	Length		Surface
Direction	m	ft	Surface
09/27	1,520	4,987	asphalt
- Sources: WAD GCM Google Maps

Mongu Airport (IATA: MNR, ICAO: FLMG) is an airport serving Mongu, the capital city of Western Province, Zambia. The airport is 2 kilometres (1.2 mi) northeast of the city.

== Facilities ==
The airport resides at an elevation of 3,488 feet (1,063 m) above mean sea level. It has one runway designated 09/27 with an asphalt surface measuring 1,520 by 21 metres (4,987 ft × 69 ft). The Mongu non-directional beacon (Ident: MG) is located 2.3 nautical miles (4.3 km) north of the airport. The Mongu VOR-DME (Ident: VMG) is located 1.2 nautical miles (2.2 km) east of the Runway 27 approach threshold.

== See also ==
- Transport in Zambia
- List of airports in Zambia
