= Ngoma Airport =

Airport in Zambia

- IATA: ZGM; ICAO: FLNA

Summary
- Airport type: Public / Military
- Serves: Ngoma, Zambia
- Elevation AMSL: 3,400 ft / 1,036 m
- Coordinates: 15°57′57″S 25°56′00″E

Map
- Location of airport in Zambia

Runways
Direction	Length		Surface
Direction	m	ft	Surface
09/27	1,060	3,478	Gravel
- Source: GCM Google Maps

Ngoma Airport (IATA: ZGM, ICAO: FLNA) is a rural airstrip serving Ngoma (west of Namwala and south of Itezhi-Tezhi), a settlement within the Kafue National Park in the Southern Province in Zambia.

The runway is 6 kilometres (3.7 mi) south of the village. It has an additional 205 metres (673 ft) of gravelled overrun on the east end.

== See also ==
- Transport in Zambia
- List of airports in Zambia
