= Smith Point Airport =

- IATA: SHU; ICAO: YSMP

Summary
- Airport type: Public
- Location: Cobourg, Northern Territory
- Elevation AMSL: 30 ft / 9 m
- Coordinates: 11°07′58″S 132°09′28″E

Map
- Location in Northern Territory

Smith Point Airport (IATA: SHU, ICAO: YSMP) is a small airport in the Northern Territory, Australia.
