= São Lourenço Airport =

Comte. Luiz Carlos de Oliveira Airport Aeroporto Comte. Luiz Carlos de Oliveira
- IATA: SSO; ICAO: SNLO; LID: MG0037

Summary
- Airport type: Public
- Serves: São Lourenço
- Time zone: BRT (UTC−03:00)
- Elevation AMSL: 875 m (2,871 ft)
- Coordinates: 22°05′27″S 045°02′40″W

Map
- Location in Brazil SSO (Brazil)

Runways
Direction	Length		Surface
Direction	m	ft	Surface
05/23	1,300	4,265	Asphalt
- Sources: ANAC, DECEA

Comte. Luiz Carlos de Oliveira Airport (IATA: SSO, ICAO: SNLO) is the airport serving São Lourenço, Brazil.

== Access ==
The airport is located 3 km (2 mi) from downtown São Lourenço.

== See also ==
- List of airports in Brazil
