= Santa Rosalía Airport =

- IATA: SSL; ICAO: SKSL

Summary
- Airport type: Public
- Serves: Santa Rosalía, Colombia
- Elevation AMSL: 400 ft / 122 m
- Coordinates: 5°07′50″N 70°52′07″W

Map
- Location of the airport in Colombia

Runways
Direction	Length		Surface
Direction	m	ft	Surface
06/24	950	3,117	Asphalt
- Source: GCM Google Maps

Santa Rosalía Airport (IATA: SSL, ICAO: SKSL) is an airport serving the village of Santa Rosalía in the Vichada Department of Colombia.

The runway is alongside the southeastern bank of the Meta River.

== See also ==
- Transport in Colombia
- List of airports in Colombia
