= Kasompe Airport =

Airport in Chingola, Zambia

- IATA: CGJ; ICAO: FLKE

Summary
- Location: Chingola
- Elevation AMSL: 4,636 ft (1,413 m)
- Coordinates: 12°34′22″S 27°53′38″E

Map
- Location of airport in Zambia (Copperbelt Province in red)

Runways
Direction	Length		Surface
Direction	m	ft	Surface
11/29	1,432	4,698	Asphalt
- Sources: WAD GCM

Kasompe Airport (IATA: CGJ, ICAO: FLKE) is an airport serving Chingola, a town in the Copperbelt Province in Zambia. The airport is in the suburb of Kasompe, 3 kilometres (1.9 mi) southeast of Chingola.

The Kasompe non-directional beacon (ident: KE) is approximately 1 kilometre (0.54 nmi) west of the Rwy 11 threshold.

== See also ==
- Transport in Zambia
- List of airports in Zambia
