= Santa Rosalía, Vichada =

Coordinates: 5.12611°N 70.8758°W

Santa Rosalia
- town
- Flag

- Location of the town and municipality of Santa Rosalia in the Department of Vichada.
- Country: Colombia
- Region: Orinoquía
- Department: Vichada

Area
  - Total: 3,937 km^{2} (1,520 sq mi)
- Elevation: 320 m (1,050 ft)
- Time zone: UTC-5
- Climate: Aw
- Website: santarosalia-vichada.gov.co/

Santa Rosalía (Spanish pronunciation: [ˈsanta rosaˈli.a]) is a town and municipality located in the Department of Vichada, Colombia.

== Geography ==
The area is part of the Llanos plain shared by Colombia and Venezuela, located within the Orinoquia region of Colombia. The municipality has an average temperature of 28 °C throughout the year, persisting a hot and dry climate. The seat of the municipality lies on the riviera of the Meta River which also serves as boundary between the Department of Vichada and the Department of Casanare.

The municipality of Santa Rosalia limits to the north with the Department of Casanare; to the east with the municipality of La Primavera; to the south with the municipality of Cumaribo and to the west with the Department of Meta.

== History ==
The area of present-day Santa Rosalia was inhabited by indigenous tribes, predominantly the Guahibo people. Upon the arrival of the Spanish people and other Europeans, the region was not colonized until the 16th century. The settlement was established as a port for embarking cattle from the haciendas. In 1993 La Primavera was proclaimed municipality.

== See also ==
- Santa Rosalía Airport
