= Savé Airport =

Airport in Colines, Benin

- IATA: SVF; ICAO: DBBS

Summary
- Airport type: Public
- Serves: Savé
- Location: Benin
- Elevation AMSL: 656 ft / 200 m
- Coordinates: 8°1′5.7″N 2°27′52.1″E

Map
- Location of Savé Airport in Benin

Runways
Direction	Length		Surface
Direction	m	ft	Surface
05/23	1,204	3,950	DIRT
- Source: Landings.com

Savé Airport (IATA: SVF, ICAO: DBBS) is a public use airport located near Savé, Collines, Benin.
