= Sparrevohn Air Force Station =

Closed US Air Force radar station in Alaska

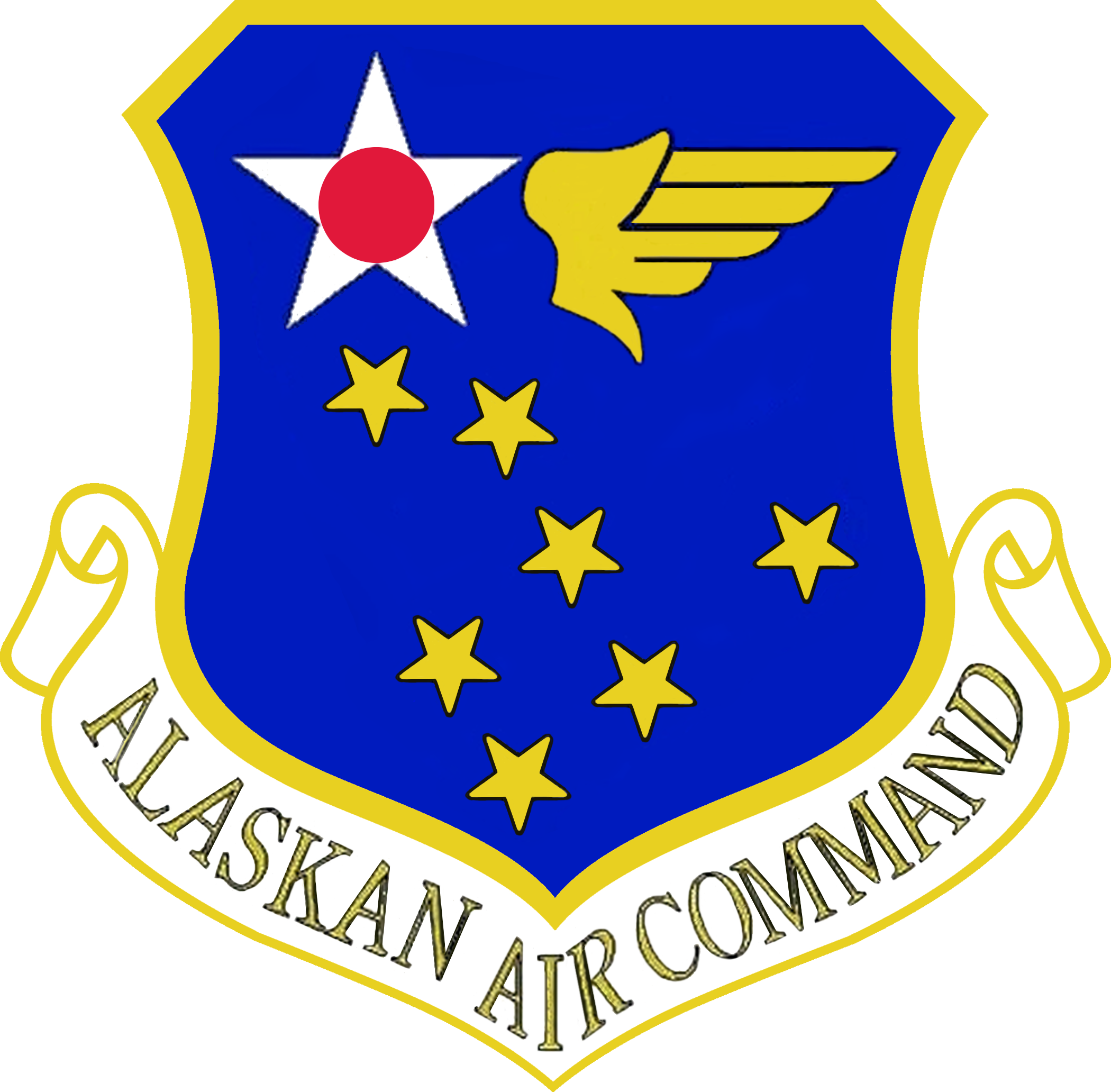
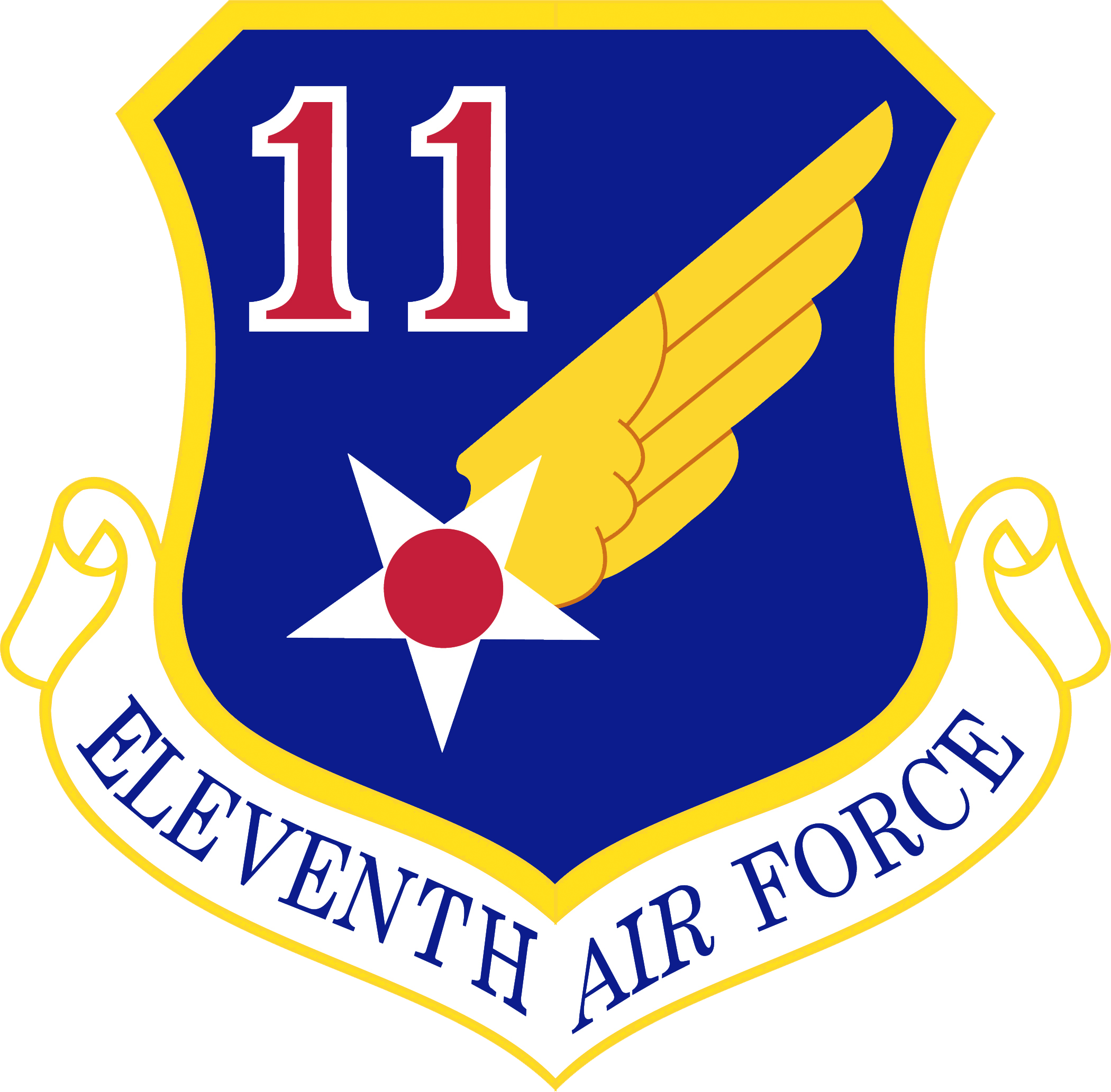
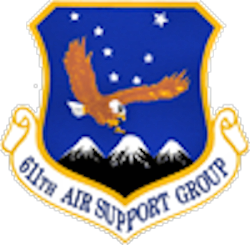
Sparrevohn Air Force Station Sparrevohn Long Range Radar Site
- Part of Eleventh Air Force (PACAF)
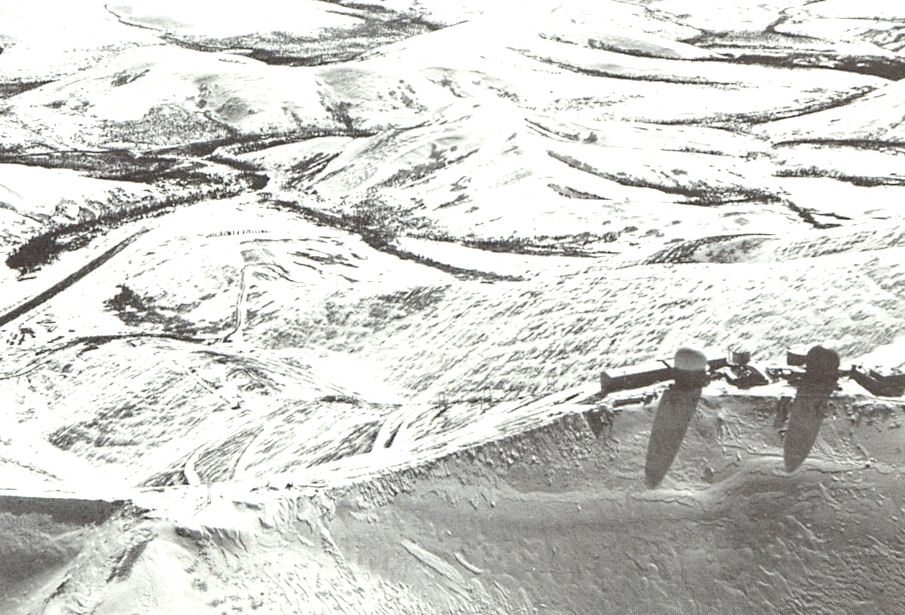
- Photo of Sparrevohn Air Force Station showning the upper and lower camps and airstrip during mid-winter

Site information
- Type: Air Force Station
- Controlled by: United States Air Force

Location
- Location of Sparrevohn AFS, Alaska
- Coordinates: 61°07′08″N 155°35′51″W

Site history
- Built: 1954
- In use: 1952-Present

Garrison information
- Garrison: 719th Aircraft Control and Warning Squadron (1954-1983)

Sparrevohn Air Force Station (AAC ID: F-15, LRR ID: A-06) is a closed United States Air Force General Surveillance Radar station. It is located 356 miles (573 km) southwest of Fairbanks, Alaska.

The ground control intercept (GCI) station was closed on 1 November 1983, and was re-designated as a Long Range Radar (LRR) site as part of the Alaska Radar System. Today, it remains active as part of the Alaska NORAD Region under the jurisdiction of the 611th Air Support Group, Elmendorf AFB, Alaska.

== History ==
Sparrevohn AFS was a continental defense radar station constructed to provide the United States Air Force early warning of an attack by the Soviet Union on Alaska.

Construction of the station began in January 1953 and was completed in October 1955. The Army Transportation Corps undertook the project. The radar station site was located on the summit of Cairn Mountain at 3,400 ft elevation (top camp), with a ground support station on a slight ridge between 1,600 and 1,800 ft at the base of the summit 61°05′50″N 155°34′51″W. Access to the radars was initially by a road built up the side of the mountain; later, a cable tramway was built. The tramway cables frequently broke because of high winds and ice, and fog and the extreme cold made repairs hazardous. Ice 16 inches thick built up on the cables in winter.

The station was one of the most difficult to construct and one of the most expensive in Alaska. All supplies and equipment initially had to be disassembled then the pieces parachuted to the site by aircraft; many times the equipment landed in wilderness instead of the cleared base site area. Bears were a hazard, and the initial construction crew had to winter over in the sub-zero environment in hastily constructed Quonset huts, working in the elements. In the spring of 1955, United States Army engineers constructed a 4,000 ft gravel airstrip 61°05′57″N 155°34′29″W adjacent to the base site, which allowed transports to bring in supplies, equipment and other material directly without the need for airdrops by parachute.

The station consisted of a power/heating plant, water and fuel storage tanks, gymnasium and other support office buildings. Two other buildings contained living quarters, work areas, and recreational facilities, plus opportunities for sports such as skiing, skating, horseshoes, and basketball. Except for the civil engineering building, the station buildings were connected by heated hallways. As a result, personnel stationed there, with few exceptions, were able to wear "summer" uniforms year round, unless they had a need to go outside in winter. The coverings of the station's three radar towers were heated from within to keep the covering from becoming brittle from extreme cold, and thus subject to being damaged or destroyed by high winds. Tours at the station were limited to one year because of the psychological strain and physical hardships.

The 719th Aircraft Control and Warning Squadron, activated in March 1954, operated AN/CPS-5 AN/CPS-4 AN/FPS-3, AN/FPS-20A and AN/FPS-66 radars at the top site. The top site was a mini-station in its own right, where twelve airmen lived; two radio maintenance, nine radar maintenance, and a cook. Later, a control room was added and a full Surveillance and Weapons Control crew lived at top camp, five Weapons Control officers and the Radar officer with a full complement of support troops from weapons technicians to cooks. Barracks were connected between the radomes. Between the domes were other barracks rooms and the dayroom/library/kitchen/movie theater.

The station operated as a long-range surveillance radar station, which provided information continuously to the air defense Direction Center at King Salmon AFS where radar contacts were analyzed to determine range, direction altitude speed and whether or not aircraft were friendly or hostile. An AN/FYQ-9 Semiautomatic Data Processing and Display System was installed and became operational in July 1965, eliminating the need to pass track data manually.

Communications were initially provided by a high frequency radio system which proved unreliable because of atmospheric disturbances. The Alaskan Air Command, after investigating various options, decided to build the White Alice Communications System, a system of Air Force-owned tropospheric scatter and microwave radio relay sites operated by the Air Force Communications Service (AFCS). The Tatalina site 61°07′12″N 155°35′32″W was activated in 1957. It was inactivated in 1979, and replaced by an Alascom owned and operated satellite earth terminal as part of an Air Force plan to divest itself of the obsolete White Alice Communications System and transfer the responsibility to a commercial firm.

Over the years, the equipment at the station was upgraded or modified to improve the efficiency and accuracy of the information gathered by the radars. In 1983, Sparrevohn received a new AN/FPS-117 minimally attended radar under Alaskan Air Command's SEEK IGLOO program. It was designed to transmit aircraft tracking data via satellite to the Alaskan NORAD Regional Operations Control Center (ROCC) at Elmendorf Air Force Base.

No longer needed, the 719th ACWS was inactivated on 1 November 1983 and the station re-designated as a Long Range Radar (LRR) Site. This left only contractor personnel to maintain the site radar. In 1990, jurisdiction of the Sparrevohn LRR Site was transferred to Eleventh Air Force with the re-designation of AAC.

In 1998 Pacific Air Forces initiated "Operation Clean Sweep", in which abandoned Cold War stations in Alaska were remediated and the land restored to its previous state. After years of neglect the facilities at the station had lost any value they had when the site was closed. The site remediation was carried out by the 611th Civil Engineering Squadron at Elmendorf Air Force Base, and remediation work was completed by 2005.

== Demographics ==
Historical population
Census	Pop.	Note	%±
1980	26		—
U.S. Decennial Census

Sparrevohn Air Force Station appeared once on the 1980 U.S. Census as a census-designated place (CDP). With its closure in 1983, it did not appear again on the census.

== Current status ==
Today very little of the former Sparrevohn Air Force Station remains. The site is controlled by the Pacific Air Forces 611th Air Support Group, based at Elmendorf AFB. Contractor access to the site to support the FPS-117 is by the Sparrevohn LRRS Airport.

It is generally unattended, A few civilian contractors access the site for maintaining the facilities. A new ground support structure was erected on the site of the former bottom camp for storage of equipment, vehicles, and for brief overnight stays by support personnel.

- Currently, the site is continuously attended by contractors to maintain the runway, power station, radar, facilities and supporting infrastructure.

== Air Force units and assignments ==
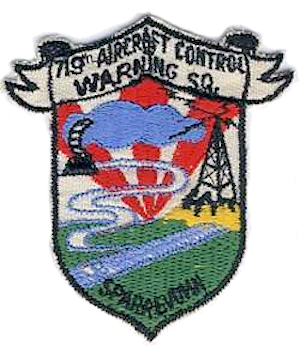
Emblem of the 719th Aircraft Control and Warning Squadron

Units:

- 719th Aircraft Control and Warning Squadron, 1958–1983
- 5059th Air Postal Squadron, 1958-1983

Assignments:

- 11th Air Division

== See also ==
- Alaskan Air Command
