= Santa Maria Airport (Peru) =

Santa María Airport Aeródromo de Santa María
- IATA: SMG; ICAO: SPMR

Summary
- Location: Santa María del Mar, Lima, Peru
- Coordinates: 12°23′29″S 076°45′21″W

Map
- Location of airport in Peru
- Sources: GCM, ASN

Santa María Airport (IATA: SMG, ICAO: SPMR) is an airport in Santa María, a district of Lima Province in Peru.
