= Safi Airport =

Closed airport in Morocco

- IATA: SFI; ICAO: GMMS

Summary
- Airport type: Closed
- Serves: Safi
- Location: Morocco
- Elevation AMSL: 1,718 ft / 524 m
- Coordinates: 32°16′23″N 9°14′13″W
- Interactive map of Safi Airport

Safi Airport (IATA: SFI, ICAO: GMMS) was an airport serving Safi, Morocco.

The airport is closed and has been built over. It's one of the smallest airports in Morocco that have been ever exist. Only the smallest airline had landed here.

Google Earth historical imagery from 10/1/2004 shows the remains of 1,718 metres (5,636 ft) Runway 07/25 with building construction in progress. Current satellite image shows the area covered with streets and apartment blocks.

== See also ==
- Transport in Morocco
