= Sparrevohn LRRS Airport =

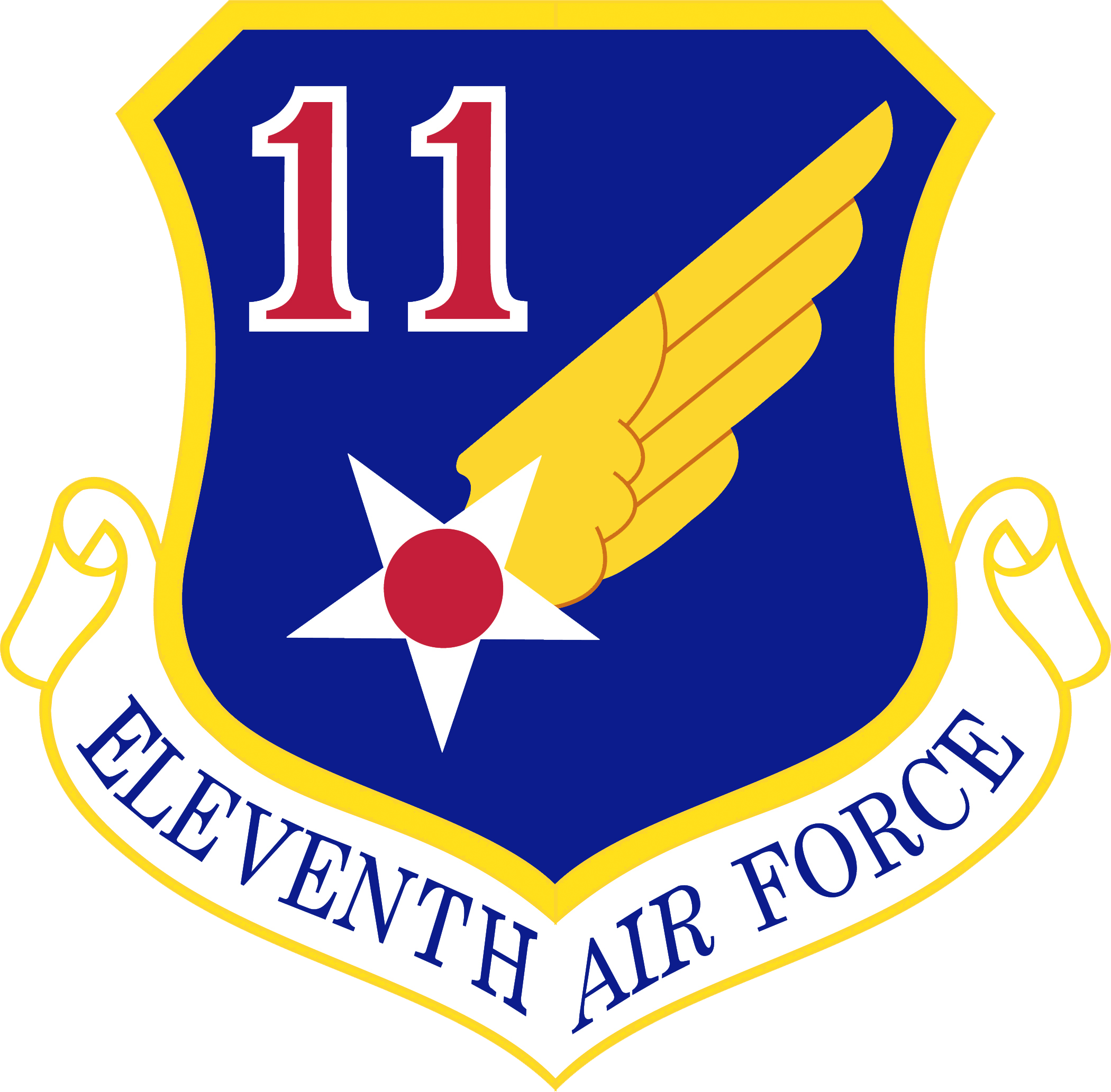
Sparrevohn LRRS Airport
- IATA: SVW; ICAO: PASV; FAA LID: SVW

Summary
- Airport type: Military
- Owner: U.S. Air Force
- Location: Sparrevohn, Alaska
- Elevation AMSL: 1,585 ft / 483 m
- Coordinates: 61°05′50″N 155°34′29″W

Map
- Location of airport in Alaska

Runways
Direction	Length		Surface
Direction	ft	m	Surface
16/34	4,198	1,280	Gravel

Statistics (1978)
- Aircraft operations: 240
- Source: Federal Aviation Administration

Sparrevohn LRRS Airport (IATA: SVW, ICAO: PASV, FAA LID: SVW) is a military airstrip located south of Sparrevohn, in the Bethel Census Area of the U.S. state of Alaska. The airstrip is also located 129 miles (208 km) south of McGrath, Alaska, and 188 miles (303 km) west of Anchorage, Alaska. It is not open for public use.

== Overview ==
Sparrevohn Airport is a United States Air Force military airstrip. Its mission is to provide access to the Sparrevohn Long Range Radar Site for servicing and other requirements.

The airstrip was constructed in 1952 as part of the construction of the Sparrevohn Air Force Station. During the station's operational use as a staffed radar station, it provided transportation for station personnel and for supplies and equipment to be airlifted to the station. With the radar station's closure in 1983, the airstrip now provides access to the site for supply runs and to transfer crews.

It is staffed by five or fewer civilian contractors at any one time, and is not open to the public. During the winter months, it may be inaccessible due to the extreme weather conditions at the location.

== Facilities and aircraft ==
Sparrevohn LRRS has one runway designated 16/34 with a gravel surface measuring 4,198 by 151 feet (1,280 x 46 m). For the 12-month period ending July 17, 1978, the airport had 240 general aviation aircraft operations, an average of 20 per month.
