= Sulaco, Yoro =

Sulaco
- Municipality
- Location in Honduras
- Coordinates: 14°55′N 87°16′W
- Country: Honduras
- Department: Yoro
- Villages: 14

Area
  - Total: 236.65 km^{2} (91.37 sq mi)

Population (2015)
  - Total: 18,161
  - Density: 76.742/km^{2} (198.76/sq mi)
- Time zone: UTC-6 (Central America)

Sulaco is a municipality in the Honduran department of Yoro.

== Demographics ==
At the time of the 2013 Honduras census, Sulaco municipality had a population of 17,509. Of these, 99.09% were Mestizo, 0.61% White, 0.17% Indigenous and 0.14% Black or Afro-Honduran.
