= Winston Field Airport =

- IATA: SNK; ICAO: KSNK; FAA LID: SNK

Summary
- Owner/Operator: Scurry County
- Serves: Snyder, TX 79549
- Elevation AMSL: 2,430 ft / 740.66 m
- Coordinates: 32.69958°N 100.94823°W

Map

Runways
Direction	Length		Surface
Direction	ft	m	Surface
08/26	4,200	1,280.2	Asphalt
17/35	5,599	1,706.6	Asphalt
- Sources: AOPA website

Winston Field Airport (IATA: SNK, ICAO: KSNK, FAA LID: SNK) is an airport located 2 miles southwest from Snyder, Texas. The airport was opened during July 1950. The airport normally handles about 31 aircraft every day. This airport is located in the Llano Estacado region of Texas between Abilene and Lubbock and serves the entire Scurry County area. This airport is equipped for airplanes or helicopters of any size.

As for the runways, the primary runway is 5,599 feet and the secondary is 4,400 feet. The foundation for the airport was laid in 1945 when Winston Greene, along with others, managed to secure a piece of land that would become the site of the airport. Winston Field offers many activities such as flight training, aerial firefighting and cargo services.
