= Soledade de Minas =

Coordinates: 22°04′S 45°03′W

- Municipality
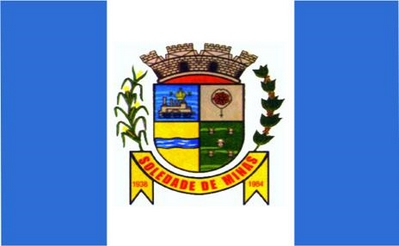
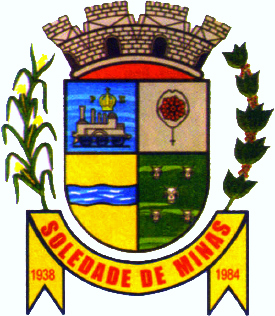
- Flag Coat of arms
- Interactive map of Soledade de Minas
- Country: Brazil
- Region: Southeast
- State: Minas Gerais
- Mesoregion: Sul/Sudoeste de Minas

Government
  - Mayor: Emerson Ferreira Maciel (PPS)

Population (2020)
  - Total: 6,189
- Time zone: UTC−3 (BRT)

Soledade de Minas is a municipality in the state of Minas Gerais in the Southeast region of Brazil.

== See also ==
- List of municipalities in Minas Gerais
