= Senanga Airport =

Airport in Zambia

- IATA: SXG; ICAO: FLSN

Summary
- Airport type: Public
- Serves: Senanga
- Elevation AMSL: 3,370 ft / 1,027 m
- Coordinates: 16°06′45″S 23°18′00″E

Map
- Location of the airport in Zambia

Runways
Direction	Length		Surface
Direction	m	ft	Surface
10/28	1,155	3,789	Dirt
- Sources: Google Maps GCM

Senanga Airport (IATA: SXG, ICAO: FLSN) is a public airport serving the Zambezi River town of Senanga, Western Province, Zambia.

The airport is in the southwest section of the town. West approach and departure cross the river.

== See also ==
- Transport in Zambia
- List of airports in Zambia
