= Stroud Municipal Airport =

Airport in Oklahoma, United States

- IATA: SUD; ICAO: KSUD; FAA LID: SUD

Summary
- Airport type: Public
- Owner: City of Stroud
- Serves: Stroud, Oklahoma
- Elevation AMSL: 900 ft (270 m)
- Coordinates: 35°47′22″N 096°39′20″W

Map
- Location of airport in Oklahoma

Runways
Direction	Length		Surface
Direction	ft	m	Surface
18/36	3,000	914	Asphalt

Statistics (2012)
- Aircraft operations: 200
- Source: Federal Aviation Administration

Stroud Municipal Airport (IATA: SUD, ICAO: KSUD, FAA LID: SUD) is a public use airport in Lincoln County, Oklahoma, United States. It is owned by the City of Stroud and located three nautical miles (6 km) north of its central business district. This airport is included in the National Plan of Integrated Airport Systems for 2011–2015, which categorized it as a general aviation facility.

== Facilities and aircraft ==
Stroud Municipal Airport covers an area of 180 acres (73 ha) at an elevation of 900 feet (274 m) above mean sea level. It has one runway designated 18/36 with an asphalt surface measuring 3,000 by 60 feet (914 x 18 m). For the 12-month period ending September 20, 2012, the airport had 200 general aviation aircraft operations, an average of 16 per month.
