= Sesheke Airport =

Airport in Zambia

- IATA: SJQ; ICAO: FLSS

Summary
- Airport type: Public
- Serves: Sesheke, Zambia / Katima Mulilo, Namibia
- Elevation AMSL: 3,100 ft / 945 m
- Coordinates: 17°28′36″S 24°18′20″E

Map
- Location of the airport in Zambia

Runways
Direction	Length		Surface
Direction	m	ft	Surface
09/27	945	3,100	Gravel
- Sources: Google Maps GCM

Sesheke Airport (IATA: SJQ, ICAO: FLSS) is an airport in the town of Sesheke, Western Province, Zambia. It also serves the town of Katima Mulilo, across the Zambezi River in Namibia.

The Katima Mulilo non-directional beacon (Ident: KL) is 11.8 nautical miles (21.9 km) southwest of the airport.

== See also ==
- Transport in Zambia
- List of airports in Zambia
