= Sakeji =

Sakeji may refer to:

- Sakeji River, a tributary of the Zambezi.
- Sakeji School, a school near Kalene Hill in the Mwinilunga District of northwest Zambia
- Sakeji Horseshoe Bat, a species of bat in the family Rhinolophidae endemic to Zambia
