= Sakeji River =

Location
- Country: Zambia

Physical characteristics
- Source
  - elevation: 1,400 metres (4,600 ft)
- Mouth
  - coordinates: 11.11684°S 24.32978°E

The Sakeji River is a tributary of the Zambezi. The river rises to the south of Kalene Hill in Ikelenge District, Zambia. It flows northward to join the upper reaches of the Zambezi from the left.

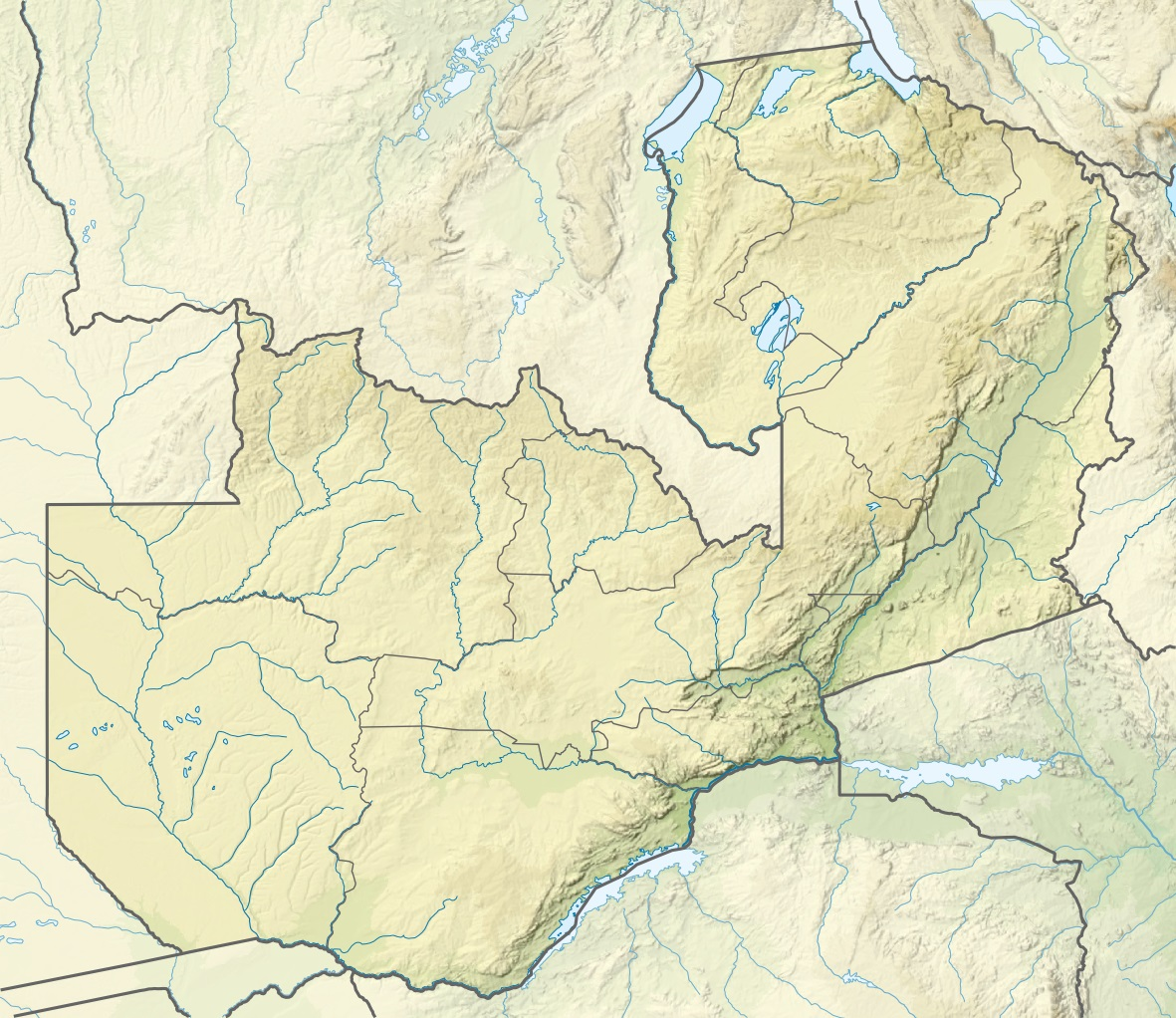
Location in Zambia

The Sakeji School, a primary boarding school in the Ikelenge District overlooks the Sakeji River, which provides hydroelectric power and is used for recreation by the children. A water wheel on the Sakeji powers a generator that charges battery cells at the school, providing power for lighting. Diesel generators are used to provide additional power as needed.

== Sources ==
- Elyea, Dan (Fall 2003). "Sakeji School" (PDF). Simroots. 20 (2).
- "Sakeji School (Zambia)". Assembly Care Ministries. Archived from the original on 2011-12-04.
