= Sakeji School =

Location
- Ikelenge, Ikelenge District, North-Western Province; Zambia
- Coordinates: 11.233233°S 24.311403°E

Information
- School type: Primary boarding
- Motto: Tu vero permane
- Religious affiliation: Protestant
- Established: 1925
- Age: 6 to 13
- Enrollment: 74 (2012)
- Website: sakeji.com

The Sakeji School is a school near Kalene Hill in the remote Ikelenge District of north-western Zambia, just north of Mwinilunga. It is a Christian boarding school for primary students. It is mainly intended to serve the children of missionaries in the region, including Zambia, Angola and the Democratic Republic of the Congo, but the school also accepts expatriate and Zambian children.

== Location ==
The school overlooks the Sakeji River, a tributary of the Zambezi River, which provides hydroelectric power and is used for recreation by the children. At an altitude of about 1,400 metres (4,600 ft) the climate is warm in the day and cool in the evening, particularly during the dry season months of June and July. Rainfall, mainly falling between October and April, averages about 1,400 millimetres (55 in). Meat and milk are purchased from Hillwood Farm. Local growers provide fresh fruit and vegetables, while most other supplies are brought in from the Copperbelt region.

== History ==
Doctor Walter Fisher and his wife, founders of the mission at Kalene Hill, founded the school in 1925 as a place to educate their own six children and those of other missionaries in the area. They had received a gift of 50 pounds for that purpose in 1922. They chose a site about 25 kilometres (16 mi) from Kalene Hill, at first calling it "Kalene School". ffolliot Fisher, son of the mission founders, donated the land for the school. The school was close to ffolliot Fisher's Hillwood farm. It boarded the children of European missionaries from all Protestant denominations.

In the 1920s the government of Northern Rhodesia understood the difficulty of finding properly trained teachers, but the department of education was not sympathetic to the idea of an "itinerant evangelist giving a little instruction by the way in reading and writing". The head of the department said "One of the main aims of the Department should be to educate and keep up to the mark the missionaries in charge of the training of teachers...". After an inspection of the Kalene school, the missionaries were told they did not meet the minimal standards required to qualify for grants. They were not accustomed to interference or criticism, so this triggered an extended dispute between the school and the government before being resolved when the school agreed to meet standards.

The name was changed to "Sakeji School" in 1932 when a local "Kalene school" was opened at Kalene Hill. In 1952 the school had almost 60 pupils. Without the school, the children of missionaries would have had to be sent "home" to their parents' distant countries at considerable financial and emotional expense. The school therefore served a very valuable function in keeping missionaries in the field. Although the teachers were Plymouth Brethren missionaries and the study of scripture was a large part of the curriculum, the educational system discouraged blind belief and encouraged a degree of questioning. The local Lunda people also took advantage of the Brethren schools including Sakeji to educate their "best and brightest". Although the Catholics closed their premier school, St. Kizito, in the 1970s and all the other former missionary schools in Mwinilunga are now run by the government, the Plymouth Brethren continue to support the Sakeji School, one of the best in the district.

== Today ==
As of 2012 the school had 74 pupils between the ages of 6 and 14 and fourteen missionary teachers and care givers. At its maximum in the early 1960s there were 110 boarders. Both the children and the teachers come from a variety of countries. Although the school is remote, it provides excellent boarding accommodations and teaching facilities. The boarding school is used by some of the more prosperous Zambians, ensuring that it is well funded. The buildings are burnt brick and the roofs wood truss design with corrugated aluminium roofing. A water wheel and hydro electric turbine on the Sakeji river provide power for lighting alongside the local power utility. Diesel generators are used to provide additional power as needed. Communications to the outside world are provided by VSAT, which also support email. Cellphone coverage is present by the two major carriers in Zambia Airtel and MTN.

== Sources ==
- "Sakeji School (Zambia)". Assembly Care Ministries. Archived from the original on 2011-12-04.
- Barnett, Gavin (2008). "Sakeji School". Like a River Glorious. Lulu.com. ISBN 978-0-620-32098-6.
- Elyea, Dan (Fall 2003). "Sakeji School" (PDF). Simroots. 20 (2). Archived from the original (PDF) on 2012-04-26.
- Hanna, Douglas (2011). "Sakeji School Roofing Needs in Zambia".
- "History". Sakeji School. Archived from the original on 2012-04-06.
- McIntyre, Chris (2008). Zambia: the Bradt travel guide. Bradt Travel Guides. ISBN 978-1-84162-226-2.
- Pritchett, James Anthony (2001). The Lunda-Ndembu: style, change, and social transformation in South Central Africa. Univ of Wisconsin Press. ISBN 0-299-17154-X.
- Pritchett, James Anthony (2007). Friends for life, friends for death: cohorts and consciousness among the Lunda-Ndembu. University of Virginia Press. ISBN 978-0-8139-2624-7.
- Ragsdale, John P. (1986). Protestant mission education in Zambia, 1880-1954. Susquehanna University Press. ISBN 0-941664-09-0.
- "Sakeji School Charter". Sakeji School. Archived from the original on 2012-04-06.
- Turner, Victor Witter (1972). Schism and continuity in an African society: a study of Ndembu village life. Manchester University Press ND. ISBN 0-7190-1038-1.
- Vail, Leroy (1989). The Creation of tribalism in Southern Africa. University of California Press. ISBN 0-85255-042-1.
