= Zambezi Basin =

Drainage basin of the river Zambezi

The Zambezi basin.

The Zambezi basin is an African drainage basin, whose main flow is the Zambezi River, being the fourth largest basin on the continent, in addition to being the most important basin in southern Africa. It covers approximately 1,390,000 km², crossing regions with high population density, sometimes in areas of low density, such as the Kavango–Zambezi Transfrontier Conservation Area. The Zambezi Watercourse Commission (ZAMCOM) has been in existence since 2004 with the aim of strengthening cooperation in sharing its resources concerned. Another supranational initiative for watershed management is Zambezi River System Action Plan (ZACPLAN).

The drainage area of the basin covers Angola, Botswana, Tanzania, Namibia, Zambia, Zimbabwe, Malawi and Mozambique, being the main supplier of fresh water, electricity and fish to the populations of these regions, mainly from the last five nations. The basin is home to immense wet plains, being responsible for the climatic regulation of a rich ecosystem of savannas and humid forests that surround it.

Its main navigable course is through the Zambezi River, being the stretch of the mouth in the Indian Ocean (more precisely in the Mozambique Channel) until it surrounds the city of Tete, in the northwest of Mozambique. There are also navigable courses in the Cahora Bassa and Kariba lakes, and in the plains of the Mana Pools, Caprivi Strip, Liuwa-Luena-Baroste-Siloana, Shire, Luangwa and Lake Nyassa, the latter three of which are navigable within two its thirteen sub-basins.

Two major sub-basins in the Zambezi basin are interconnected with other major African systems, namely: (a) the Lake Nyassa/Shire River sub-basin, which connects with the Great Rift Valley, and; (b) the perennial river bifurcation in the Selinda Spillway (or Magwegana river), in the Cuando River sub-basin, which connects the Zambezi Basin to the Kalahari Basin.
