= Matabeleland Zambezi Water Project =

Gwayi-Shangani
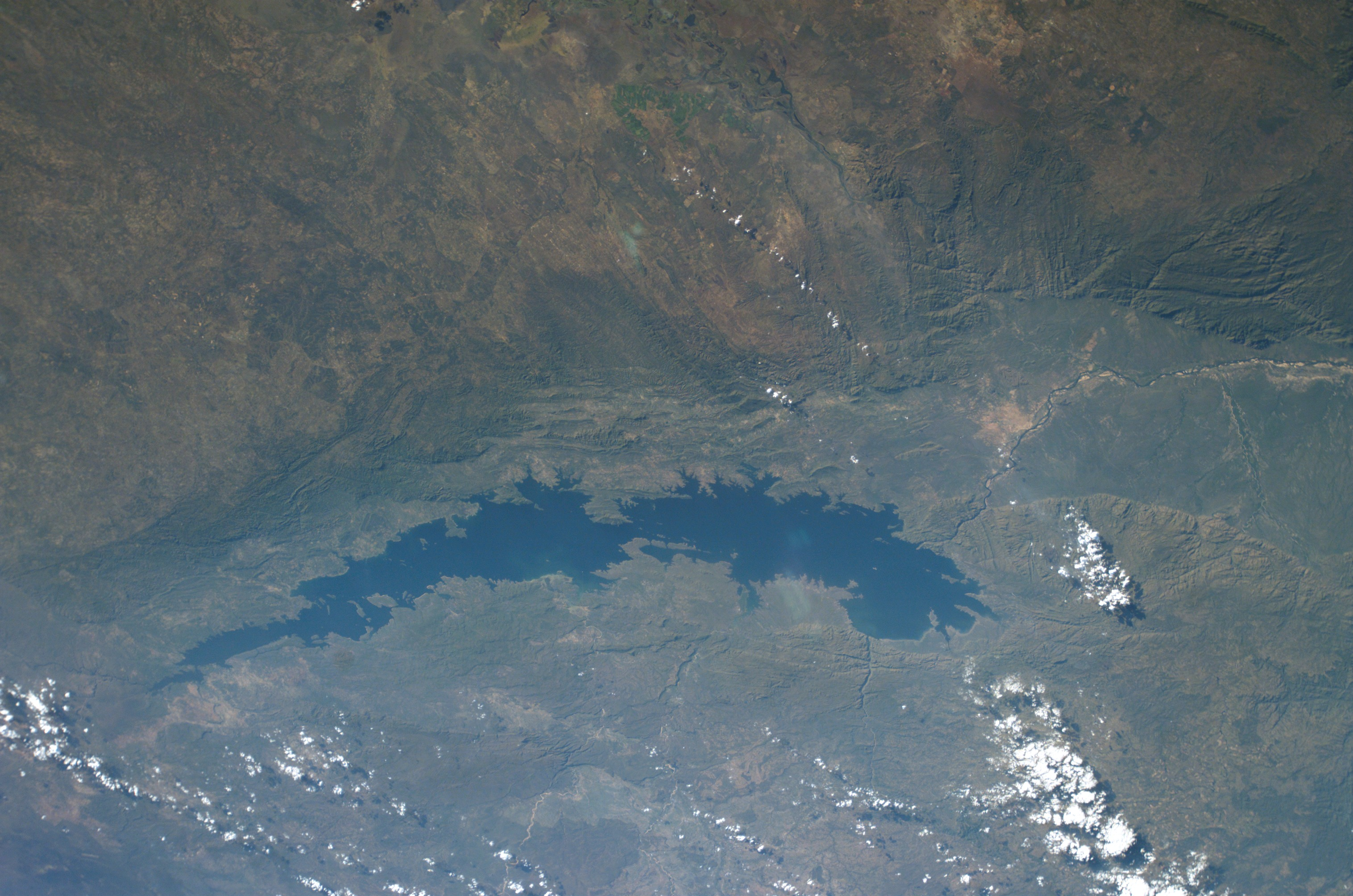
- Gwayi-Shangani

- Location within Zimbabwe Location within Africa
- Coordinates: 18°30′26″S 27°11′22″E
- Type: (project) reservoir
- Catchment area: 39,076 km^{2} (15,087 sq mi)
- Basin countries: Zimbabwe
- Max. depth: 70 m (230 ft)
- Water volume: 634 million cubic metres (514,000 acre⋅ft)
- Surface elevation: 817 m (2,680 ft)

The Matabeleland Zambezi Water Project (MZWP) is an ambitious project being undertaken in the arid Matabeleland North province of Zimbabwe.The project seeks to end the perennial water shortages bedevilling Zimbabwe's second city of Bulawayo by bringing water from the mighty Zambezi river to the city.

== The project ==
The project can be classified as a major project. It is expected to cost US$600 million which is a huge investment by African standards. The project will consist of three phases as follows:

- Phase one: Gwayi-Shangani Dam
- Phase two: Gwayi-Shangani Dam to Bulawayo Pipeline
- Phase three: Gwayi-Shangani Dam to Zambezi River Pipelne

== Phase one: Gwayi-Shangani Dam ==
The Gwayi-Shangani dam is the first phase of the MZWP and is the core of the project. Commenced in September 2004, it is expected to provide a reservoir for this project. The dam will be located about 6 km downstream of the confluence of the Gwayi River and Shangani River.

As of May 2025, completion of this dam within its projected completion year of 2025 is under doubt.

=== Dam type and description ===
- Type: It is a roller-compacted concrete gravity dam, which means it is a dam relying on its weight for stability.
- Dimensions
  - Length: 305 metres from one mountain to the other.
  - Width: 60 metres at the base.
  - Height: 70 metres maximum.
  - Bridge: Dam will have a bridge at the top of width 8 m.
- Depth and capacity
  - Maximum water depth: 59 metres, 11 metres freeboard.
  - Capacity: 634 million m^{3}
  - 10% Yield: 210 million m^{3}
- Materials used and quantities
  - Concrete: 300,000 m^{3}
  - Quarry: 400,000 m^{3}
  - Cement/water ratio: 0.55
  - Fly ash/cement ratio: 7:3
  - Concrete grades: dental 20, other 25.

== Phase two: Gwayi-Shangani Dam to Bulawayo Pipeline ==
The envisaged pipeline will be 260 km. Construction of the pipeline is scheduled to be completed in 2022. In April 2021, the Government of Zimbabwe floated a tender for the construction of the pipeline.
