= Zengamina =

Dam in Kalene Hill, Zambia

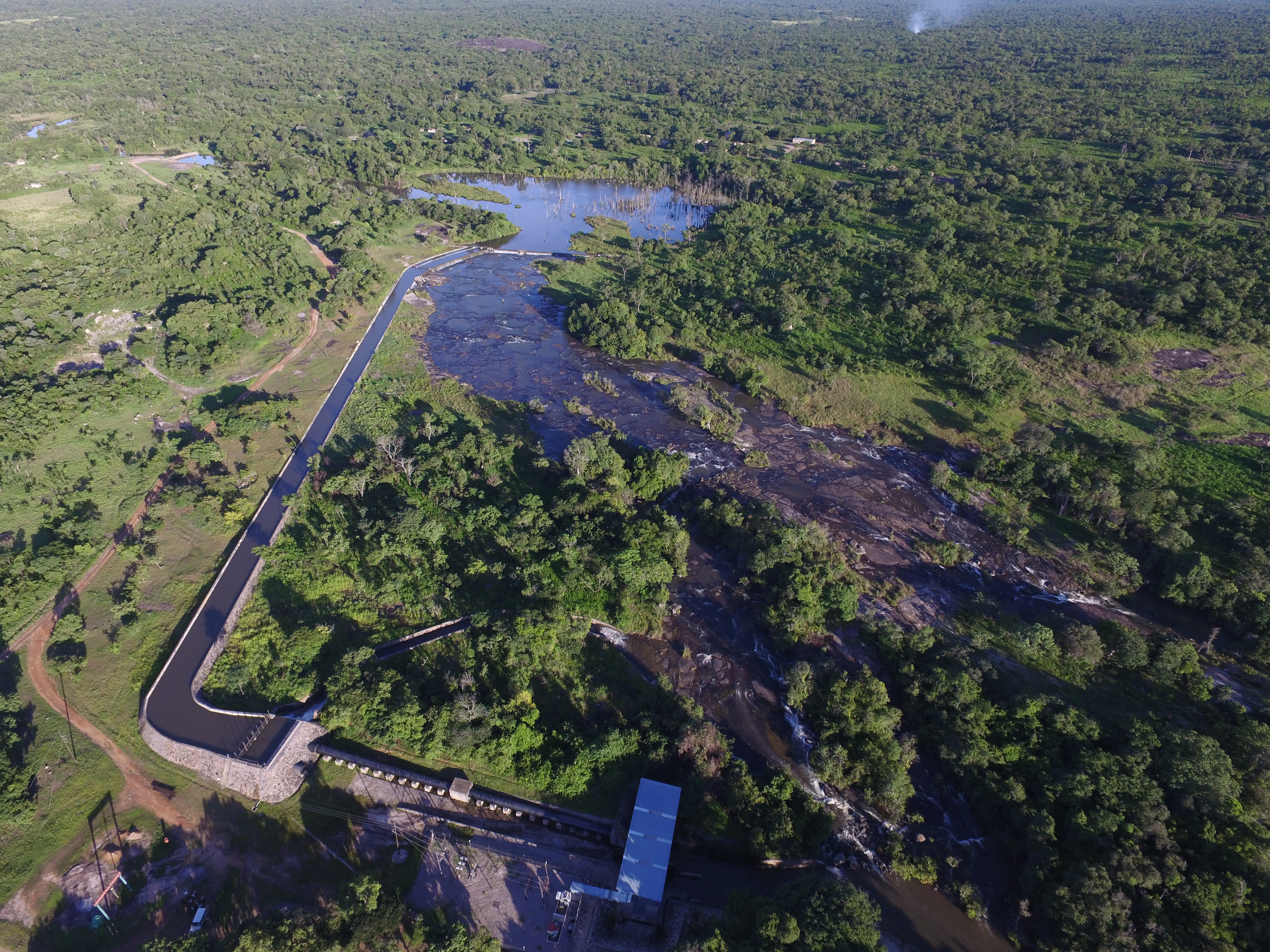

- Location within Zambia
- Country: Zambia
- Location: Kalene Hill
- Coordinates: 11.123939°S 24.192152°E
- Status: Operational
- Construction began: 2004
- Opening date: 2008
- Construction cost: $3 million

Zengamina is a small hydroelectric power generation plant near Kalene Hill, Ikelenge District in northwestern Zambia. It was built between 2004 and 2008 at a cost of about $3 million, or $4,285 per kilowatt of power.

== Background ==
Before the power plant was opened most people had no electricity, using wood or kerosene for cooking. Those who could afford it used diesel generators to provide electricity. The Zambian national electricity grid ends 380 kilometres (240 mi) from the Ikelenge area. The local people were trapped in a poverty cycle, living through unsustainable slash-and-burn subsistence farming.

The Zengamina project aimed to provide a reliable electrical supply with a small hydroelectrical station on the Zambezi River at a fast-moving point close to its source. The Zambezi at this location drops 17 metres (56 ft) over a 350-metre (1,150 ft) length of rapids. The potential for power generation on the Zambezi rapids was identified in 1964, but without funding nothing was done.

In 2001 Dr Peter Gill, an orthopaedic surgeon in the United Kingdom, launched a trust to fund the project. The primary motive was to reduce the cost of providing electricity to the Kalene hospital, which serves people in Angola and the Democratic Republic of the Congo as well as Zambia, in a period when diesel fuel costs were continuing to rise. The Zambian government provided some seed funding, and church groups in Britain managed to raise another $2.5 million to cover construction costs.

== Construction ==
Construction of the 0.7 megawatts (940 hp) facility began in March 2004. The project was initiated by the North West Zambia Development Trust, a small charity associated with the mission station at Kelene Hill. Construction mostly used local labour, with little machinery. This included building a 100-metre (330 ft) weir, 400-metre (1,300 ft) canal parallel to the river leading to a headpond, 70-metre (230 ft) penstock, powerhouse building and tailrace. The electrical system includes a cross-flow turbine, a 400 V/33 kV step-up transformer, 35 kilometres (22 mi) of 33 kV line and 10 kilometres (6.2 mi) of 400 V line.

The take-off weir is low, has little impact on the river and causes no risk to flora or fauna. The facilities are inconspicuous and require little effort to maintain. Most of the construction was of mortar and masonry using local granite that had been blasted to clear the canal. This approach greatly reduced costs, while making the structure blend with its surroundings. A local community school and church were also built using materials, transport and expertise provided for the hydro project.

The project was officially commissioned on 14 July 2007 by President Levy P. Mwanawasa. By mid-2008 the project was operational, supplying electricity to the hospital. A larger transformer was being installed, after which other customers would come on stream. There is potential to double capacity by installing a second turbine. Significant extensions are needed for the grid to meet all the people who want power.

== Benefits ==
Once operational, the power station supplied Kalene Hospital with sustainable green power, as well as the local clinics, the Kalene Farm orphanage, schools and 1,000 houses. Many benefits are expected from the improved power supply over and above the improvements in medical and educational facilities. Small and medium enterprises are expected to form, such as pineapple canning, increasing employment. The power will support improved drinking water and sanitation systems, raising levels of health. Better lighting at night will help students and allow for evening work, and so on.
