= Kalene Hill =

- Location within Zambia
- Coordinates: 11.167371°S 24.183054°E
- Country: Zambia
- Province: North-Western
- District: Ikelenge District
- Climate: Cwa

Kalene Hill is a community in the northwest of Zambia near a hill by the same name about 3 kilometres (2 mi) to the southeast. It is part of the Ikelenge District. Kalene Hill was the site of an early medical mission. The hospital is still important to the region.

== Location ==
The Kalene hill is a low ridge of Karoo sandstone. It lies in Lunda territory. It is found in the Ikelenge District on the T5 Road of Zambia.

Local tradition says that a chief created it when he found his way was blocked by a huge swamp. The chief called on his ancestral spirits and dropped magic powder along the route he wanted to take. Dry land broke up from the marsh and formed the long hill of today.

The hill is close to the Democratic Republic of the Congo (DRC) to the north and Angola to the west. At 1,500 m (5,000 ft) the hilltop is often cool. From the summit one can see far into Angola and the DRC. The Zambezi has its source near Kalene Hill at an elevation of about 1,460 m (4,790 ft). To the west of the hill the land falls away steeply to the headwaters of the Zambezi River, where there is the Zengamina hydroelectric power generation plant.

== Mission foundation ==
In the 1880s Kalene Hill was an important slave trading center, where Ovimbundu slavers came to deal with Ndembu headmen. In 1884 the Plymouth Brethren missionary Frederick Stanley Arnot traveled through the region and identified the source of the Zambezi. He considered that Kalene Hill would be a particularly suitable place for a mission, since he thought the cool breezes would keep it relatively free of malaria-carrying mosquitoes. In 1905 the medical missionary Walter Fisher, who had accompanied Arnot on a later visit to Africa in 1889, established a hospital at Kalene Hill. The Fishers had left a well-established mission deep in Angola. Dr. Walter Fisher and his wife Anna founded the Kalene Hill station at the summit of the hill. At that time, all household and medical supplies had to be carried in by porters from the coast, a two-month journey.

The original hospital was built using the traditional Angolan method of making bricks from baked anthill. The ruins are still in existence. The Fishers brought ample supplies of cloth, beads, iron tools and utensils. In exchange for these, they had no difficulty hiring labour and construction proceeded fast. A serious incident occurred during the cold, dry season, when temperatures at night often dipped below the freezing point. One night a spark from the fire in the kitchen the grass roof alight. The fire spread and destroyed all of the Fishers' trade goods, medical supplies and personal possessions. Fortunately, local Europeans quickly made good the damage and more help arrived from overseas. Fisher's prestige was enhanced in the eyes of the local people by the huge tribute that he had received from distant parts.

== Expansion ==
As the hospital became established, nurses and doctors arrived from Europe. The station was well supplied with fruits, grains and vegetables from the countryside, fish from the river, and goats, sheep, cows, pigs and chickens raised by the mission. The station became a place where Europeans in the area could come for a taste of the comforts of their homeland. In 1909 the station was visited by Frederick Stanley Arnot, who had first recommended the site. Stewart Gore-Browne visited the mission in 1912 but was not impressed. He said "The people weren't rude, but they weren't courteous, & they looked apathetic, & the whole place was slack & untidy & slovenly; they'd too many clothes on & yet not enough". He wrote in his diary: "Lost in wonder at the pluck, narrowness, and faith of these people".

Fisher considered that Africans should become "civilized" through adopting European values. However, he also realized that it would be much easier for the local people to learn Christianity if taught in their own language. His two older sons, Singleton and Ffolliott, were raised by African nurses, played with African children and became bi-lingual in Lunda and English. In 1919 Singleton produced the first Lunda-Ndembu grammar, a work that is still in use.

At first, the Ndembu people thought of Kalene Hill as a government center, and brought tribute to Fisher. Harsh treatment by colonial administrators in Angola and continued illicit slave trading caused people to come to settle near the mission for safety. A trading center was set up at Kalene early on. Ffolliott Fisher established Hillwood farm, and then opened a store, 19 km (12 mi) from Kalene. The Fishers founded the Sakeji School in 1925 as a place to educate their own six children and those of other missionaries in the area. They had received a gift of 50 pounds for that purpose in 1922. They chose a site overlooking the Sakeji River about 25 km (16 mi) from Kalene Hill, at first calling it "Kalene School". The school was close to Ffolliott's Hillwood farm. It boarded the children of European missionaries from all Protestant denominations. The name was changed to "Sakeji School" in 1932 when a local school was opened at Kalene. In 1952 the school had almost 60 pupils.

Fisher was always willing to teach, taking on apprentices at no charge and explaining modern medicine to them. He showed how to identify the microbes that cause disease and how to treat them, including how to make a smallpox vaccine from the blood of smallpox victims. Fisher died on 30 December 1935 and was buried on the hill. Due to shortage of water, soon after Fisher's death the hospital was moved to its present location at the foot of the hill. Since it was founded, people have travelled long distances to the hospital for treatment. One of the main ailments has always been malaria, with children and pregnant women most at risk.

== Today ==
The present hospital was built in the 1950s. It is associated with the Christian Missions in Many Lands (CMML). As of 2008 the hospital, an airy building with brick walls and a tin roof, had about 160 beds. The hospital provides inpatient and outpatient services. These include maternity care, paediatrics, infectious diseases, malnutrition and surgery. The hospital is a source of training for mission hospital and health clinic staff in Zambia, Angola and the DRC. The orphanage founded by the Fishers is now on Hillwood Farm. As of 2011 it was in the care of Paul and Eunie Fisher. There is an airstrip near the community. In 2008 the CMML began to use it as a base for its missionary aviation program.

The Zambian national electricity grid ends 380 km (240 mi) from the Ikelenge area. Until recently most people in the area had no electricity, using wood or kerosene for cooking. Those who could afford it used diesel generators to provide electricity. The growing local population was trapped in a poverty cycle, with very low levels of formal employment, living through unsustainable slash-and-burn subsistence farming. The Zengamina hydroelectric project on the Zambezi has provided 24-hour electricity to the hospital since 2007, later extended to the orphanage, schools and 1,000 houses. Many benefits are expected from the improved power supply over and above the improvements in medical and educational facilities. Small and medium enterprises are expected to form, such as a pineapple cannery, increasing employment. The power will support improved drinking water and sanitation systems, raising levels of health. Better lighting at night will help students and allow for evening work, and so on.

The Zambian government has declared the Source of the Zambezi at Kalene Hill to be a national monument. The site, about 1,500 m (4,900 ft) above sea level, is marked with a copper plaque that was unveiled in 1964 as part of the independence celebrations. A US$300,000 visitor center was being completed in 2007 in an effort to attract tourists. There are also hopes that the Zambezi rapids can be turned into a tourism site.

== Sources ==
- Akweenda, S. (1997). International law and the protection of Namibia's territorial integrity: boundaries and territorial claims. Martinus Nijhoff Publishers. ISBN 90-411-0412-7.
- Arnot, Frederick Stanley (1969). Garenganze: Or, Seven Years' Pioneer Mission Work in Central Africa. Routledge. ISBN 0-7146-1860-8.
- "Bringing Energy and Life to an African Community Through Profit-Producing Ventures: Create Wealth in Africa August 2011". Creating Wealth in Africa. September 8, 2011.
- "Construction of 700KW run-of-river "Zengamina" Hydro Electric Scheme" (PDF). ARUP. Archived from the original (PDF) on 2012-12-24.
- "Hillwood and Nchila - When to Visit". Bradt Travel Guide.
- Gupta, Avijit (2008). Large Rivers: Geomorphology and Management. John Wiley & Sons. ISBN 978-0-470-72371-5.
- "History". Sakeji School. Archived from the original on 2012-04-06.
- Howard, Dr. J. Keir (2005). "Arnot, Frederick Stanley". Dictionary of African Christian Biography. Archived from the original on 2007-09-27.
- "Kalene Mission Hospital". Kalene Mission Hospital.
- McIntyre, Chris (2008). "Source of the Zambezi". Zambia: the Bradt travel guide. Bradt Travel Guides. ISBN 978-1-84162-226-2.
- McNeill, Paul D. (2008). "The Hill of God" (PDF).
- Pritchett, James Anthony (2007). Friends for life, friends for death: cohorts and consciousness among the Lunda-Ndembu. University of Virginia Press. ISBN 978-0-8139-2624-7.
- Quigg, Steve (August 2008). "Kalene Hill and CMML" (PDF). Safety Net. XVIII (2). Mission Safety International. Archived from the original (PDF) on 2012-04-26.
- Rea, Charles (March 1–3, 2006). "Zengamina Mini Hydro Project" (PDF). UNEP.
- Rotberg, Robert I. (1977). Black heart: Gore-Browne and the politics of multiracial Zambia. University of California Press. p. 50. ISBN 0-520-03164-4.
- Turner, Victor Witter (1972). Schism and continuity in an African society: a study of Ndembu village life. Manchester University Press ND. ISBN 0-7190-1038-1.
- "Zengamina Hydro Project". North West Zambia Development Trust. Archived from the original on 2022-04-23.
