= Walter Fisher (missionary) =

Medical missionary who worked in Zambia

- Born: 29 November 1865; Greenwich, England
- Died: 30 December 1935 (aged 70); Zambia
- Education: Guy's Hospital
- Occupation: Medical missionary / Surgeon

Walter Fisher (29 November 1865 – 30 December 1935) was an English surgeon and missionary who worked in Zambia for over 40 years. Born in Greenwich, Fisher was raised in a large, middle-class home. A "Plym", Fisher used his faith as a foundation for his service to people. He completed his medical studies in Guy's Hospital and qualified as a surgeon in 1887.

Fisher established the Kalene Mission Hospital in 1906 in the remote northwest corner of Zambia. The mission expanded to the Mwinilnga district in Zambia's North-Western Province and to neighboring areas of Angola and the Democratic Republic of Congo. The hospital was known for embracing the local Zandu culture. A school, orphanage, clinic, and farm were later added to the services at Kalene.

== Early life and education ==
Fisher was born on November 29, 1865, in Greenwich, England, the fifth of nine children. His father was a businessman and owned a fleet of fishing smacks. His parents had a deep interest in gospel work and often hosted missionaries, including Robert Chapman and Henry Groves.

Fisher was raised as a "Plym", which was a member of the religious community originally known as the Plymouth Brethren. This community would later be known as CMML, Christian Missions in Many Lands. Any adult male in the church, often referred to as a "brother", could give a sermon or lead communion; a different approach than most Christian branches that allocate these responsibilities to ordained priests. This foundation heavily motivated Fisher and he knew from a young age that he wanted to be involved in missionary work, later being baptized at the age of fifteen.

Fisher attended Guy's Hospital as a student in 1881 and by 1887 he completed his studies with the qualification of a surgeon and with a gold medal in surgery. Instead of staying in England to complete his studies for the highest surgical qualification, Fisher decided that he would dedicate his life to missionary work in Africa.

=== Family ===
In May 1892, Fisher married Susanna Elizabeth Darling, a nurse at the Angola mission which was Fisher's first African post. In 1893, the couple moved to Kavungu. They had three children in Kaavungu; one died during childbirth.

The Fishers moved to Kazombo, becoming the first Europeans to settle there. They had a daughter who was born in Kazombo and died there in 1902.

== Career ==
In 1888, Fisher met Fred Stanley Arnot, who had spent seven years in Africa at the time. After attending a presentation by Arnot he decided to commit his life to medical and missionary work in Central Africa. In March 1889, Fisher joined Arnot's crew as they sailed to Africa and by December they arrived in Kwanjulala.

In May 1829, Fisher met his wife and moved from Kwanjulala to Kavungu for the next six years. By the turn of the century the Fishers had established a mission station at Kavungu in Angola by the capital of the local Chieftainess, Nyakatolo.

Fisher interacted with different branches of the local natives, the Lunda, specifically the Lunda-Ndembu. The local Lunda religion and culture, like most African countries, was influenced by the belief in the supernatural. They saw sicknesses and diseases as something that was controlled by the supernatural and didn't believe that medicine could affect these conditions. To drive out these spirits, the Lunda people were known for using herbs and color sympathy treatments. Fisher taught people the science behind the illness. After Fisher cured the cheftainess of a lingering illness, initial resistance to Fisher's medical practice disappeared. Fisher developed a local vaccine for smallpox and performed painless surgeries with chloroform as anesthesia.

Fisher sought a modern hospital complex that could support the increasing number of African patients and European missionary families in Zambia. In January 1905, Fisher and his family moved to the British-held territory of Chief Ikelenge in Northern Rhodesia. They found an area on Kalene Hill and began the process of building a hospital. Surgery was carried out in Fisher's house before an official operating room was built in 1908. The first Lunda convert from the hospital was named Nyamavunda. She recovered from paralysis after being treated by Fisher and served in the fellowship in the assembly at Kalene.

By 1906, Kalene Mission Hospital was fully established. Fisher's wife, Anna, opened an orphanage just outside of Ikelenge. A nursing school was also added to the grounds where students would train and then gain employment at the Mission Hospital. In addition to medical services, educational facilities were created. The education offered were usually basic but also included training on agriculture and crafts.

Missionary activity on Kalene Hill expanded over time. A hospital, schools (including a boarding school for missionary children), an orphanage, a farm, and trading stores were founded.

== Death and legacy ==
Fisher died at the age of 70 in December 1935. His wife died three years after. Fisher's sons, Singleton and Ffolliott, carried on the work of their parents on Kalene Hill. Singleton became a missionary doctor and Ffolliott started a cattle ranch at Kalene Hill after being wounded during his service in World War I.

By 1930, Northwestern Zambia was populated with doctors, nurses farmers, teachers, and craftsmen. A network of Brethren families, mission stations, and bible study groups became part of the culture of the local population.
