= Zambezi River System Action Plan =

Zambezi River System Action Plan (ZACPLAN) is a multinational plan under the United Nations Environment Program (UNEP) to incorporate effective use, and management of the Zambezi River system. It encompasses eight countries: Angola, Botswana, Malawi, Mozambique, Namibia, Tanzania, Zambia, and Zimbabwe. The Zambezi river basin is used by all these Southern African countries; this plan attempts to manage resources collectively amongst, and between SADCC Nations to reasonably meet national, and international goals for water resources. Due to the immense river basin formed by the Zambezi River together with its tributaries, the Zambezi River System Plan is a culmination of a UN commission, to focus on the projection that the demand for the basins water resources would increase. This competition creates negative utilization, and inefficient use of resources for all these countries in a profitable manner.

Early negotiations of this plan started in the early 1980s to come up with goals to prioritize in utilizing the Zambezi River basin. A listing of goals in the form of Category I project, and Category II project were devised. Initial discussions relating to the Category I and Category II projects were initially disagreed upon, as political relations between resources, and countries could not come to an agreements of initial projects.
