= Luena River (Angola) =

River in Angola

Coordinates: 14°35′S 23°40′E

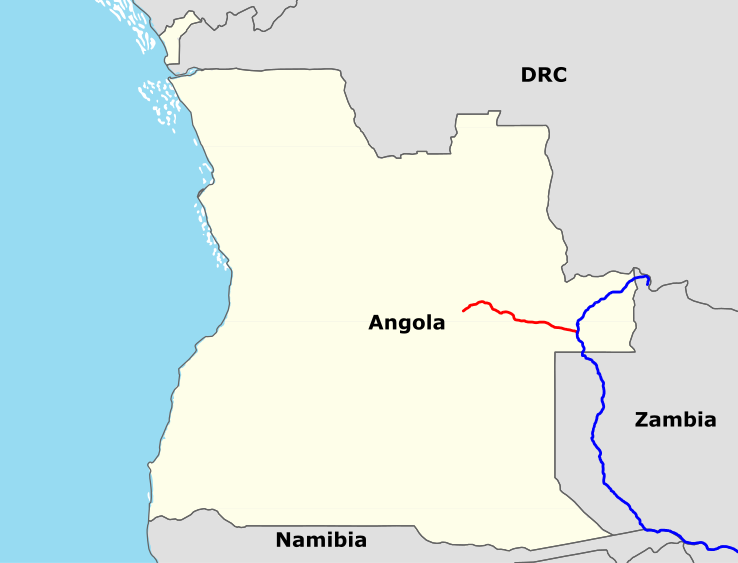
The Luena River (red) and part of the Zambezi River (blue); (simplified)

The Luena River in eastern Angola rises near the town of Luena, Angola and flows south-east to the Zambezi and below the Camenia National Park. The name is also used for an ethnic group in the area, the Luena people.
