= Gwayi River =

River in Zimbabwe

Coordinates: 17.9775°S 26.9229°E

The Gwayi River catchment

Gwayi River is a river in Zimbabwe. It is located in Matabeleland. It forms the border between Tsholotsho and Lupane districts, in the Matebeleland North province of Zimbabwe.

A dam on the river, the Gwayi-Shangani Dam, has been under construction since 2004. The dam is projected to supply water to the city of Bulawayo and comprises part of the Matabeleland Zambezi Water Project.

The river poses several risks to local residents. Drownings have occurred during the rainy season. The Gwayi River is additionally home to crocodiles, which pose a risk to local residents.
