= Ikelenge District =

Coordinates: 11°14′S 24°12′E

- District
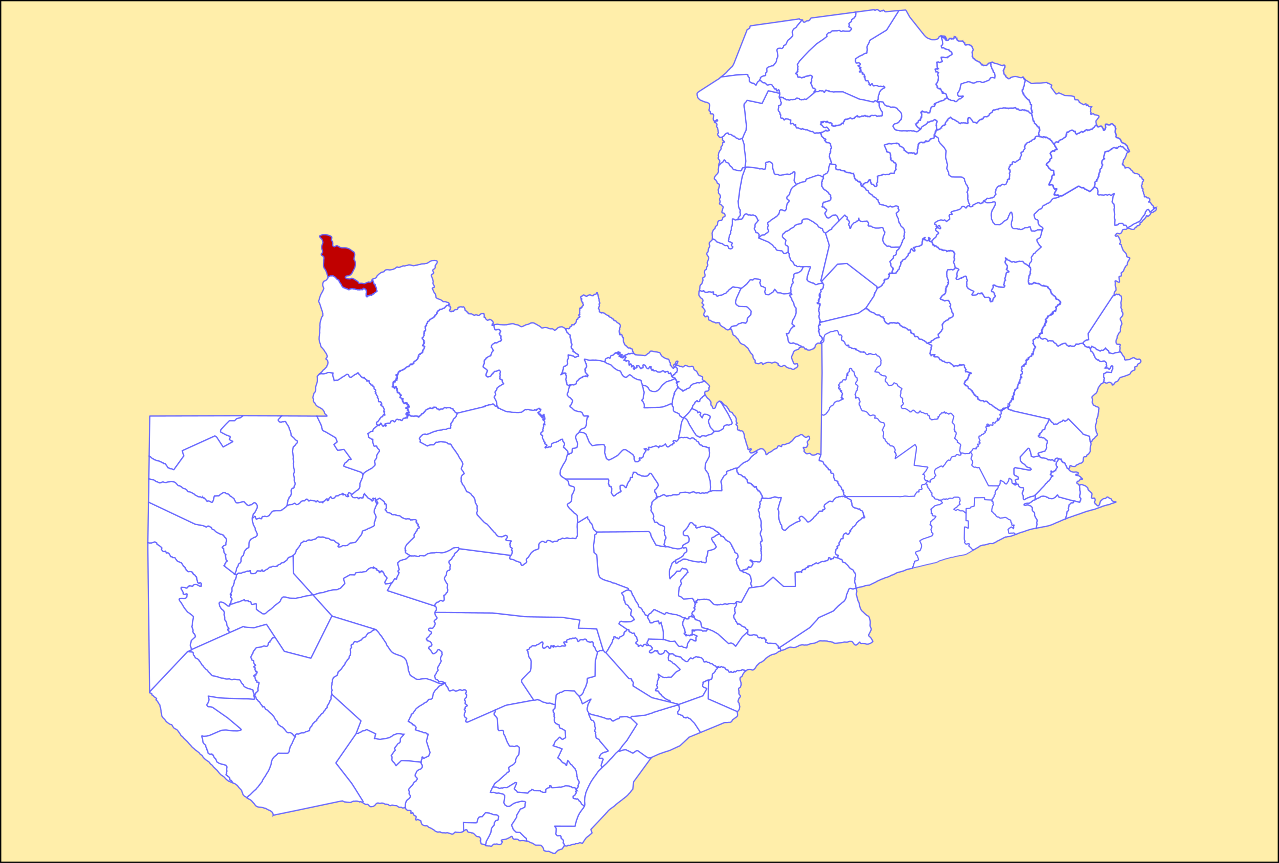
- District location in Zambia
- Country: Zambia
- Province: North-Western Province

Area
  - Total: 2,219.9 km^{2} (857.1 sq mi)

Population (2022)
  - Total: 44,775
  - Density: 20.170/km^{2} (52.240/sq mi)
- Time zone: UTC+2 (CAT)

Ikelenge District is a district of North-Western Province, Zambia. It was separated from Mwinilunga District in 2011. As of the 2022 Zambian Census, the district had a population of 44,775 people.

Ikelenge District is located north of Mwinilunga and contains the Kalene Hills together with the source of the Zambezi River and the Zengamina Hydroelectric Power Plant within its small area. The Zengamina Plant exists primarily because Zambia's national electricity grid does not reach the region.

The main road in the region is the T5 road, which connects Ikelenge to Mwinilunga in the south and to a border with Angola west of Kalene Hill.
