= Lozi kingdom =

Precolonial state in Southern Africa

- Flag
- Status: State from 17th c.– c. 1840; 1864–1899; Currently a non-sovereign monarchy within Zambia
- Capital: Pre-Makololo: Various; After Restoration: Lealui (1878–present); Limulunga (capital during high floods, 1933–present)
- Common languages: Siluyana (pre-19th c. and court language); Silozi (19th c.– present)
- Religion: Lozi traditional religion
- Government: Monarchy
- Litunga
  - 17th century: Mboo (first)
  - 1878–1884, 1885–1916: Lewanika (last sovereign)
  - 2000–present: Lubosi Imwiko II (current)
- Ngambela
  - 17th century: Inuwa
  - 1864–1871: Njekwa
  - ?–present: Mukela Manyando
- History
  - Established: 17th century
  - Conquered by the Makololo, establishment of the Kololo kingdom: c. 1840
  - Lozi rebellion and Restoration: 1864
  - Establishment of Barotziland–North-Western Rhodesia protectorate: 1899
  - Barotseland Agreement 1964 at the onset of Zambian independence: 1964
Preceded by
Lunda Empire

The Lozi kingdom or Barotseland, (Note: Also called the Luyana kingdom, Lozi Empire, or Barotse kingdom.) was a state located in modern-day western Zambia belonging to the Lozi people (called Luyi or Luyana before the 19th century). In the late-19th century, the state covered around 150,000 sq mi (390,000 km^{2}), (Note: Signed in 1890, the Lochner Treaty says the kingdom covered 200,000 sq mi (520,000 km^{2}), though historians view this as exaggerated.) and Lozi influence stretched to the Kwito River in the west, the Linyanti–Chobe and Zambezi rivers in the south, the Kafue River in the east, and the Luena-Zambezi confluence in the north.

The kingdom was likely founded in the 17th century in modern-day Kalabo District, following a migration from the Lunda Empire, with its first Litunga (king) being Mboo Mwanasilundu Muyunda. During his reign, two royal relatives, Mwanambinyi and Mange, split from the kingdom to establish their own polities. The 4th Litunga, Ngalama, reconquered these polities and expanded the kingdom further to encompass the entire Bulozi Plain. The 6th Litunga, Ngombala, established a subordinate centre of power in the south to increase control over these new lands and he extended Lozi authority into surrounding territories.

Over time, power gradually shifted from the Litunga to the aristocratic bureaucracy (represented by the National Council or Kuta) as successive Litunga were compelled to make concessions. By the reign of the 10th Litunga, Mulambwa, the kingdom was in a state of severe instability and frequent warfare, culminating in an internecine civil war between his sons, Mubukwanu and Silumelume, to succeed him. Soon after the war concluded, the weakened kingdom was conquered around 1840 by the Makololo, a Sotho group fleeing the Mfecane. A rebellion in 1864 restored the kingdom, but it was followed by factional infighting among groups that held competing visions for how the state should be organised and governed.

Following two unstable reigns, Lewanika came to power in 1878 and was deposed in 1884. Supported by traditionalist factions, he returned to power in 1885 and consolidated his authority and revived pre-Kololo institutions. As the Scramble for Africa progressed, Lewanika sought protectorate status and an alliance with the British, and signed a series of concessions starting in 1889 until 1899. Despite treaty provisions that emphasised the protection of Lozi rights, over the following years, Lewanika and the Kuta gradually lost most of their powers and some territory. In 1911, the kingdom was incorporated into Northern Rhodesia and effectively reduced to a province.

Before Zambian independence, disputes between Lozi elites and nationalist leaders led to the Barotseland Agreement of 1964, which granted the kingdom a special status within the new Republic of Zambia. The new government reneged on the Agreement and abolished the kingdom amid calls for Lozi secession. After the restoration of multi-party democracy in 1990, Lozi activists called for restoration of the kingdom's powers under the 1964 Agreement; in 2012, after a drafted constitution omitted the Agreement and President Sata failed to implement it, the Kuta argued that the annulment of all prior treaties rendered Barotseland legally sovereign, and activists have since lobbied the African Union and United Nations with little success; as of 2019 they were pursuing a petition to the International Court of Justice (ICJ).

== Etymology ==
Some traditions attribute the origins of the name Lozi to the founders of the ruling dynasty, suggesting that it later spread to their subjects. Other traditions say that the present-day Lozi were originally called Aluyana, and that the Makololo termed them Malozi in the 19th century, which was subsequently adopted. (Note: Lozi is reportedly a Sikololo word based on the Subiya pronunciation of Luyi as Luizi.) Historian Mutumba Mainga considers the latter explanation more likely, given that the language of the king's court was Siluyana. The name Rotse is a European rendering of Lozi.

In this article, Luyana is used to refer to the modern-day Lozi before Kololo conquest and rule in the mid-19th century; Lozi is used after that point and in reference to the present.

== Geography ==
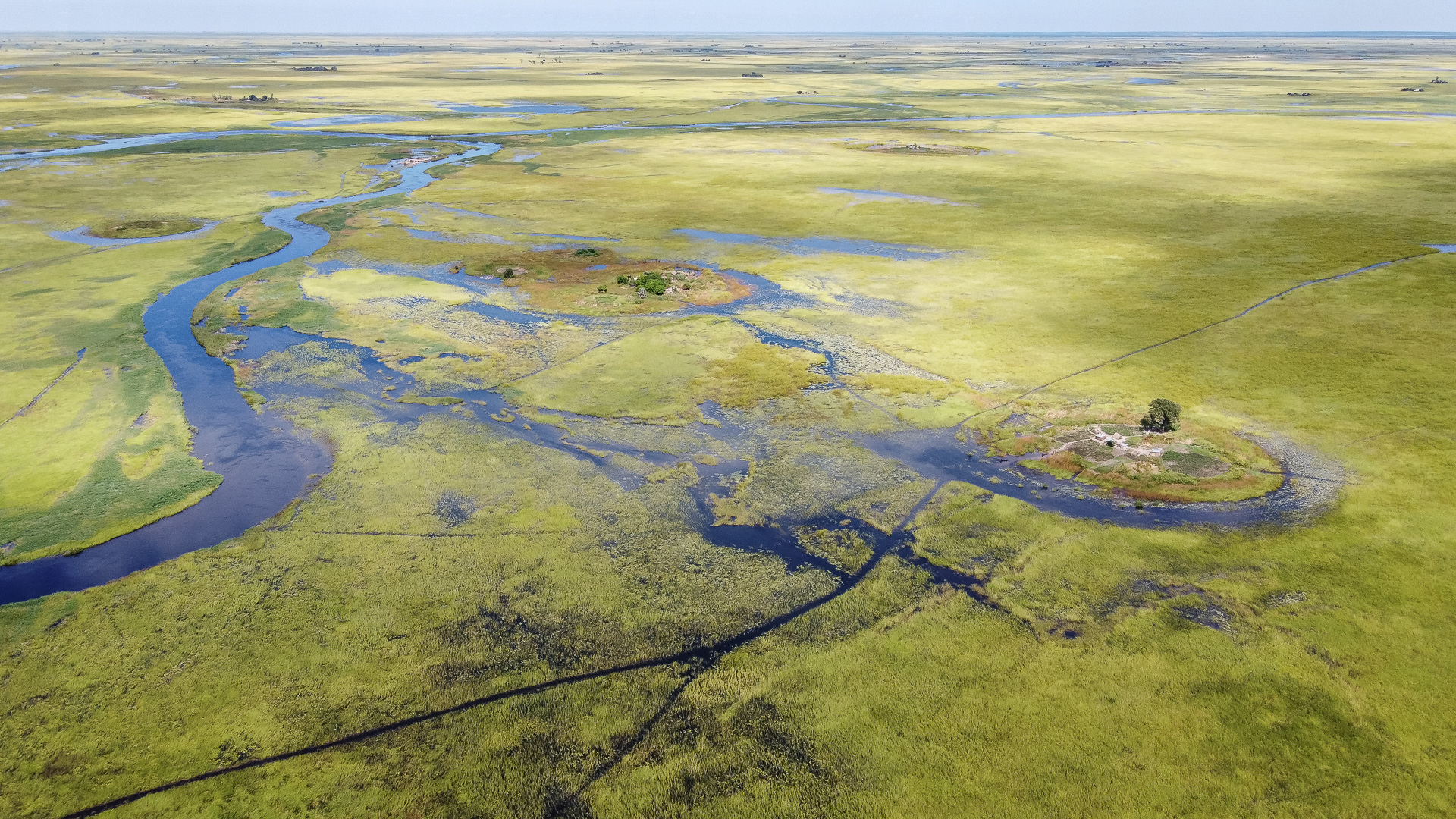
The Bulozi Plain near Mongu

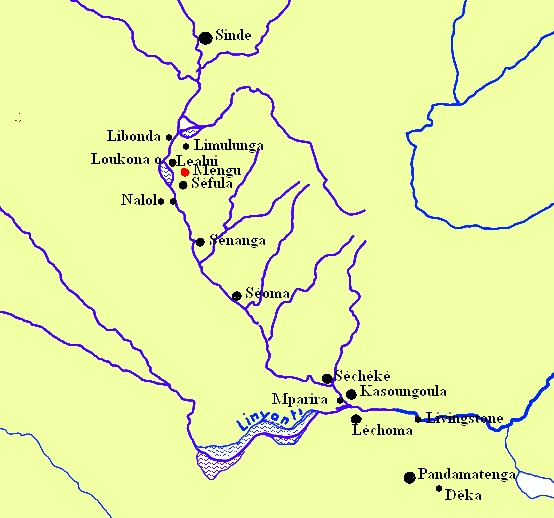
Main settlements on the Bulozi Plain

Lozi territory (also called "Barotseland") encompasses southwestern Zambia, a region characterized by Kalahari sands and shrubland. The Zambezi River runs north to south, surrounded by the Bulozi Floodplain (Ngulu), which has an abundance of alluvial deposits. The northern Zambezi Valley is referred to as "Bulozi proper". The river floods annually between January and May, and the Plain is bordered on both sides by higher forested ground. Various tributaries of the Zambezi run across the Plain, forming small valleys. The Plain is made fertile by seepage areas (mataba) below the steep surrounding embankment that channel water down the Plain and irrigate strips of land.

== History ==
=== Origins ===
Lozi oral tradition (Note: Written records on the Lozi kingdom only appear from the mid-19th century; prior to that point, Lozi history is predominantly based on oral sources. Litaba za Sicaba sa Malozi ("History of the Lozi Nation") was written by missionary Adolphe Jalla under "strict supervision" from Lewanika and the Kuta, making it an 'establishment history'. It was first published in 1909 or 1910, with later editions published in 1922, 1934, 1939, and 1951. The work served to make Lozi identity and royalism inseparable, and plays a central role in the contemporary independence movement.) holds that the Lozi were the first inhabitants of the Bulozi Floodplain, having always lived there since descending from Nyambe (God) and Mbuyu (a female ancestor) Traditions of neighbouring groups, such as the Kazembe-Lunda, Ndembu-Lunda, and Nkoya, trace the roots of the Luyana/Lozi to the Mwata Yamvo dynasty of the Lunda Empire. Historians Mutumba Mainga, Bizeck Phiri, and Lawrence Flint support this, noting that many Zambian groups trace their origin to the Congo Basin. (Note: An old theory that has since fallen out of favour proposed that the Lozi originated from the Rozvi Empire.) Mainga says that "Lozi tradition and available evidence suggest at least three successive waves of migration into Bulozi, the last of which comprised the founders of the present Lozi dynasty". Lozi traditions mention a group of small people called bo Mbonezi Kai, likely a reference to the Khoisan.

According to Lozi tradition, the Plain was inhabited by two broad groups: northerners and southerners, both organised into chiefdoms. Northerners included the Muenyi, Imilangu, Ndundulu, Mbowe, Liuwa, Simaa, Makoma, and Nyengo, while southerners included the Subiya, Mbukushu, Toka, Totela, Shanjo, and Fwe. Both groups are linguistically and probably ethnically distinct: the southerners are linguistically similar to Tonga in Zambia's Southern Province, whose speakers arrived earlier, and the northerners are somewhat linguistically similar to Luba in the DR Congo. Mainga says that the dynasty was Lunda in origin and arrived in the northern Plain, likely in the late-16th century according to Flint. She draws comparisons to groups within the Nkoya and Luvale who received their Lunda dynasties following Lunda prince Cinyama's departure after the Lunda-Luba merger, which Mainga says happened in the late-15th or 16th centuries. Due to similarities Lunda states such as Kazembe share with the main Lunda state that are not found in the Lozi state, Mainga theorizes that the Lozi-Lunda left soon after the merger out of disillusionment, while the other states were founded later as part of a policy of expansion and maintained ties with the main state. Mainga also considers the dynasty to have spoken a similar language to Siluyana, which was native to earlier people on the northern Plain, or to have adopted Siluyana as their court language.

Lozi tradition says that members of the familial dynasty rose to power among groups in the northwestern modern-day Kalabo District, (Note: Graves of early dynasty members are located in Kalabo District.) whether by overthrowing local leaders or by negotiating local political systems. (Note: Mainga mentions an informant from Mongu District who said that "the newcomers won their following by their great generosity".) A leader named Mboo Mwanasilundu Muyunda became paramount and is regarded as the first Litunga (king), dated to the 17th century. (Note: Lozi tradition says that Mbuyumwamba ("Mbuyu daughter of Mwamba") initially led the Lozi, and that upon the people's wish to have a male ruler she abdicated in favour of her oldest son, Muyunda. One strain of tradition says that Mbuyu was preceded by fourteen queens over the course of three generations (with Nasilele as the first queen), indicating high political instability.) (Note: Lozi tradition says that the institution of kingship was borrowed from Ndundulu leader Isimwaa, although Ndundulu tradition says that after making an alliance, the Lozi took control of the polity.) According to tradition, Mboo conquered the Mishulundu, Namale, Imulangu, Upangoma, Liuwa, Muenyi, and Mambowe (all located in Kalabo District at this time), though his expansion was halted at the Luena Flats by "Sihokanalinanga" (likely Nkoya leader Sihoka) and his people. Tradition says that Mboo's "brothers" and "sisters" administered their own provinces autonomously, and created their own Makolo (sing. Likolo; groups of men that served as armies or labourers, likely beginning as bands of followers). Disputes within the royal dynasty caused two groups to leave and found their own polities. One of these was led by Mwanambinyi, Mboo's younger brother. Traditions represent his power struggle with Mboo as a series of contests, during which he uses supernatural powers to best Mboo, provoking Mboo's hatred and jealousy. After Mwanambinyi survives a murder attempt by Mboo, he flees with his followers (called Akwanda or Makwanda, "fish-eaters", based on their lifestyle) and cattle to Imatongo in modern-day Senanga District, and conquers the Mbukushu and Subiya. (Note: Traditions say Mwanambinyi was accompanied by various officials, and several title-holders in Senanga District still attribute their history to Mwanambinyi.) The second group to leave was led by Mange, Mboo's nephew, who is said to have left because he was excluded from government. Accordingly, they went east across the Zambezi, and then southwards once nearer the Luena River until reaching a forest in modern-day Mongu District. Mange was said to have been a skilled hunter. (Note: There is a group of trees in Mongu District called Matondo Mange ("Trees of Mange"), said to have been where Mange hunted.)

=== Expansion ===
Over the course of the next few generations, royal prestige and power strengthened, and a royal cult developed. Institutions were borrowed from other groups and created by certain Litunga. During the reign of Yeta I (the third Litunga), all Makolo came under his control, and new ones could only be created by the monarch. Lozi tradition credits Ngalama (the fourth Litunga) with expanding the state and conquering the polities of Mwanambinyi and Mange. Tradition represents Mwanambinyi as hiding in mist or creating floods or droughts which hamper Ngalama's forces, until attrition by war causes him and his followers to "disappear into the ground" at Imatongo. (Note: Imatongo continues to be treated similarly in contemporary Lozi society to other gravesites of Litunga.) (Note: The Moama drums, which were used for royal events and during war, are said to have been captured by Ngalama from Mwanambinyi, who in turn took them from the Mbukushu.) The conquest of Mange happens after a series of defeats and Mange's dispute with his mother Nolea over a woman, which leads Nolea to surrender Mange's protective charms to Ngalama. Mange's followers were called Akangwa Mange ("those who failed Mange"), now the Makwanga. Mutumba Mainga considered these narratives to refer to real historical events. This saw the Luyana overcome rival centres of secular and ritual power to gain control of the entire Plain.

Following the conquests of Mwanambinyi and Mange, challenges arose in the administration of the newly acquired land. The distance of Mwanambinyi's lands in the south from the capital made the prior system of appointing commoners as Manduna (sing. Induna) to administer territories ineffective, and groups such as the Subiya gained autonomy. To address this, Ngombala (the sixth Litunga) established another centre of power in the south at Libumbu or Libumbwandinde. Tradition says that Notulu, Ngombala's daughter, was the first southern ruler, and details dynastic conflict between Notulu and her brother Mbanga; Mainga said that this may conceal revolts by the southern groups. Mbanga is said to have come to rule after Notulu's abdication. This southern 'kingdom' (called Lwambi and centred on Nalolo) remained subordinate to the Litunga's rule (called Namuso).

Having consolidated his control over the Plain, and with his capital at Nakaywe, Ngombala launched extensive military campaigns. The Plain was the economic heart of the region as it was linked to the wider region via the Zambezi's many tributaries, though the Luyana still relied on the forest communities for importing wood, canoes, beeswax, and various other goods. This incentivised the Luyana to conquer the surrounding communities, which were relatively decentralised and struggled to mount effective opposition. Ngombala first campaigned in the south to reconquer the Subiya and Mbukushu, and expanded further into modern-day Sesheke District to reach Victoria Falls (Musi o Tunya). His forces then went west along the Chobe River to conquer the Mashi, (Note: Some traditions say that a third royal, Ilishua, left the kingdom around the same time as Mwanambinyi and Mange to settle among the Mashi. Jalla's Litaba says that it was Ngombala who appointed Ilishua to the Kwando Valley.) then north to conquer the Makoma. Ngombala's forces met the Mbunda, conquering some of them and forming an alliance with an Mbunda leader named Yambayamba. In these newly conquered lands, Ngombala established a system of tribute wherein people were obligated to send some of what they produced to the Plain, as well as young men and women for labour. This greatly increased the wealth of the Litunga.

=== Decline of royal power and Kololo conquest ===
Over time, power gradually shifted from the Litunga to the state bureaucracy, putting the monarch in precarious situations that necessitated compromises. Though there was not initially a system for redistribution of tribute throughout the kingdom, later Litunga were pressured by the bureaucracy to weaken their monopoly. (Note: Lozi traditions recount the wealth of Yubya, and call his wife Namayowa ta lole ("she who lacks nothing"), mentioning that she bathed in milk. Yubya is said to have built lots of mounds and villages for himself. Mainga says that this likely caused resentment among the public and the Manduna.) Yubya (the seventh Litunga) introduced measures where Manduna, who collected the tribute, could keep part of it. The ninth Litunga, Mwananyanda (r. ? – c. 1780), oversaw friction between different factions of the royal family and Manduna, to which he responded with violent suppression and executions, and he is said to have killed the Ngambela (Prime Minister) and his own brother. Civil war erupted between Mwananyanda and the Lwambi ruler Mwanamatia, during which Mwanamatia was killed, allowing Mwananyanda to appoint the new Lwambi ruler (Kusio). Southern groups regularly took opportunities to revolt during internal conflict, seeking to weaken Luyana authority.

Mulambwa (the tenth Litunga, r. c. 1780 – c. 1830) challenged Mwananyanda and succeeded him to the title, also seeing off Lwambi ruler Kusio. He introduced a law that required the Litunga to provide for Makolo during war and reward them with cattle on their return, as well as one about compensating family members of deceased warriors with slaves and other loot. (Note: Mulambwa also enacted a law to meet the needs of people caught stealing by making them a village overseer or tribute collector, and only if caught repeating the behaviour could they be punished. Mainga says that this was to prevent the Litunga being seen to persecute the poor, which would have caused resentment.) Mulambwa also began giving secret prior-warning to those condemned in a bid to win popularity with the public, and made an alliance with the Nkoya, settling some of them in the Plain. Mulambwa faced extensive revolts early on, which he defeated, and gave Nkoya king Katusi a seat in the Kuta (National Council). In the south near modern-day Sesheke District, he defeated and expelled a group led by Mwana Mukasa (possibly a Tswana ruler of Tawana). After this, Mulambwa found himself in a long, drawn-out conflict against Luvale ruler Cinyama. In the early-19th century, two Mbunda groups led by Mwene Kandala and Mwene Ciyengele migrated to the Plain, seeking protection. Mulambwa welcomed them and gave the rulers seats in the Kuta, and Ciyengele was raised to the status of a prince. The Mbunda were instrumental in defeating the Luvale and assisted Mulambwa in several other conflicts. Despite this, the attempt to integrate the Mbunda into the state caused problems, partly because the state's legitimacy relied upon adherence to the Luyana ideology of kingship, wherein ancestor worship at the Royal Graves (Litino) was paramount; while the Mbunda believed in ancestral spirits, their religious beliefs attributed misfortune to witchcraft and valued divination. Thus, the Mbunda rulers were nicknamed Na yange nji Mwene ("I too am king"). (Note: Mulambwa reportedly appointed Mbunda Mwene Manulumbe as his medicine man and diviner.)

Towards the end of Mulambwa's reign, the Luyana state found itself in perilous crisis. (Note: Some Lozi traditions say that an old and nearly-blind Mulambwa cursed the population and prophesied that they would be ruled over by people with walking sticks (possibly referring to the Makololo, and then by people with books (possibly referring to Europeans).) Mulambwa was the last king of the Noble Age (Muluilonga). His death caused a succession crisis, wherein empowered senior Manduna acted as kingmakers, and several factions were realised. The kingship was contested by Silumelume in the north and Lwambi ruler Mubukwanu in the south (both sons of Mulambwa), threatening civil war. Silumelume was declared Litunga by Ngambela Muswa, though his position remained insecure. To strengthen his position, Silumelume planned to attack Mubukwanu and made preparations by sending the Makolo (armies) of two northern Manduna supportive of Mubukwanu out of the Plain to fight the Ila. One of the Manduna's Makolo included the Mbunda, and after uncovering Silumelume's plan, the Induna informed Mwene Ciyengele. Ciyengele liaised with Mubukwanu, seeking clarification. Silumelume, who had expected the Mbunda to remain neutral, grew suspicious and repeated the order to Ciyengele; Ciyengele responded that they ought to undergo a formal send-off before leaving the Plain. At the Kuta in the capital, the Mbunda performed their war dances while wearing their war dress; during the ceremony, an Mbunda shot Silumelume dead with an arrow.

Before all this, the Makololo (a Sotho people) had reached an area near the Chobe/Kwando/Linyanti River, having fled the Mfecane from modern-day South Africa's Free State in 1823. Reportedly, there was a clash between the Makololo and a Luyana army that had been sent out, which the Makololo repelled. The Makololo, led by Sebetwane, settled there for some time before moving into modern-day Southern Province by crossing the Zambezi at Kazungula. There on the Batoka Plateau, they were resisted by the Toka, whom they defeated. The Makololo then advanced towards the Kafue River, but were repelled by the Ila. They settled on the Batoka Plateau for some time before being confronted by the Northern Ndebele, who had also fled the Mfecane. The presence of the Makololo and Ndebele in the south prevented the Luyana from raiding the Toka and Ila for cattle and slaves, greatly disrupting the supply of slave labour into the kingdom. The Ndebele forced the Makololo to move once more, this time towards the Plain.

Back at the Plain, upon hearing of Silumelume's death, Mubukwanu moved northwards to claim the kingship, but found that the Namuso had rallied around a new candidate, Mwananono (a son of Mwananyanda). Mubukwanu forced Mwananono, Muswa, and some supporters to flee. Some traditions say that Muswa met the Makololo in Batoka and told them to conquer the fractured Luyana. (Note: Other traditions say that Muswa returned to the Plain and surrendered to Mbukwanu, after which he was starved to death on Mulambwa's grave. Some traditions say that Mulambwa was exiled and met the Makololo in Batoka, and told them to conquer the Luyana.) Kololo tradition says that near the Kafue River, a nameless old man with an ox horn had told them of the Plain's wealth and offered to direct them there. Before Mubukwanu could be installed, and with animosity persisting between various Luyana factions, around 1840, Sebitwane's Makololo entered onto the Plain. They ambushed Mubukwanu's forces at Kataba. Tactically and physically superior, the Makololo defeated Mubukwanu's forces, pushing them back to Nea, where they were defeated again, and again at Liondo. After their defeat, the Luyana split into three groups: one went north to Lukwakwa; the second, which included most of the royal family, went northwest to Nyengo; the third remained in the Zambezi Valley. Some traditions say Mubukwanu died in the final battle at Liondo, while others say he was captured before being rescued by Imasiku (his son), later dying by poison at Lukwakwa. Following their success, the Makololo carried out pacification campaigns to consolidate their rule over the Valley.

=== Kololo rule and the Restoration ===
During the Makololo's pacification campaign of the Valley, they were again confronted by the Northern Ndebele, led by Nxaba. Nxaba asked some Luyana fleeing to Nyengo for directions to the Makololo; a few Luyana led them to the Luete River before abandoning them there. The Ndebele moved south, where they were ambushed by the Makololo, almost wiping them out. (Note: The battleground is today known as Libala la Matebele ("Plain of the Matebele/Northern Ndebele").) Nxaba escaped and gave himself up to an exiled Luyana group who drowned him; Mainga says that this had the effect of securing Kololo rule over the Valley. The Makololo based their power in the southern Linyanti Swamps, probably because that was where they were best received by southern groups who opposed Luyana rule. Kololo rule differed greatly from Luyana rule in a number of ways. The Kololo king enjoyed greater power with fewer checks, though still valued public opinion. While the Luyana kings lived in ritual seclusion and were highly privileged, the Kololo kings were accessible to nearly everyone and regularly appeared in public. (Note: Other differences include that Kololo administrative positions were given to royals, rather than the aristocratic Manduna, and the Makololo also excluded women from politics, contrary to the Luyana.) Due to the hostility of the conquered groups against Kololo rule, the Luyana's tribute system partially collapsed, and people lived somewhat independently. The Makololo turned to external trade instead and were welcoming to Europeans. Their strong desire for firearms saw them trade slaves to the Mambari for muskets, thus linking the Plain into the wider slave trade. (Note: During his reign, Mulambwa had been approached by Mambari slave traders, though he had refused to engage with them out of principle.) Under Sebitwane, the Kololo kingdom covered the former Luyana state's lands and expanded even further. Over time, Sikololo (a Sotho language) became the lingua franca for the Plain. Its later adoption by the Luyana/Lozi was incentivised by missionaries only being able to speak the closely-related Sesotho, with borrowing from Siluyana producing Silozi.

After Sebitwane died in 1851, Kololo rule rapidly declined. The Northern Ndebele of Mthwakazi in modern-day Zimbabwe regularly launched campaigns against the Makololo in the early 1850s, often venturing deep into the Plain. The Makololo's centre of power in the south, and their focus on fortifying the Zambezi to protect against the Ndebele, left their rule over the Zambezi Valley in the north relatively weak. The extreme south also experienced high levels of malaria, which decimated the Makololo, who had little natural resistance to it. Sebitwane had placed strong emphasis on personally maintaining good relations with his various subjects (including living with Lozi royal Sipopa), and the Kololo state relied upon a strong and popular king who fostered loyal subjects. Sebitwane was succeeded by his daughter Mamochisane, who quickly abdicated in favour of her half-brother Sekeletu. The young Sekeletu struggled to live up to his father and alienated his subjects, also catching leprosy which sent him into seclusion. Several of the remaining Lozi royals fled to the exiled groups, including Sipopa, who left for Lukwakwa. In the Valley, Kololo prince Mpepe led a revolt against Sekeletu, seeking to independently rule the Valley and overthrow him. In 1853, Sekeletu had Mpepe executed, though his rule over the Valley remained weak. Suspicious of witchcraft and plots, Sekeletu ordered many executions, and several groups gained their independence.

The Lozi groups at Nyengo and Lukwakwa had both repelled Kololo invasions despite their hostility to each other, though their distance from the Royal Graves belied the establishment of a new Litunga. In 1860, Sipopa, with the support of factions at Lukwakwa and the Mbunda, killed Imasiku, who had up until then led the Lukwakwa group. In 1863, Sekeletu died, starting a Kololo succession crisis. A civil war broke out between Mpololo and Mamili (the latter of which had the support of some Lozis), with Mpololo victorious. He embarked on violent pacification campaigns and freely executed opposition, fostering widespread fear and resentment. In 1864, Mpololo ordered the execution of all sons of Lozi chiefs, sparking a Lozi rebellion led by nobleman Njekwa, which massacred the Makololo. (Note: A wounded Mpololo is said to have drowned himself out of despair.) Lozi tradition says all Kololo men were killed (though it is known some survived or fled), and women were distributed amongst themselves as wives (likely assisting in the adoption of Sikololo). By 1864, the Nyengo group had dispersed and migrated into the Lukwakwa and Valley groups. After the rebellion, Njekwa invited Sipopa back to the Valley to be installed as the new Litunga. (Note: Njekwa was asked to be the Litunga, but as a traditionalist he refused because he was not a royal.)

Over the following years, Sipopa embarked on numerous pacification campaigns to secure Lozi rule over the Plain. The restored kingdom experienced significant instability due to factions that held divergent interests and visions for the state. Lozi traditionalists sought a revival of the pre-Kololo state, and the return of a kingship ideology based on the Royal Graves and lineage from Mbuyu and Nyambe. Others were content with continuing post-Kololo institutions and structures. The Mbunda sought a return to their pre-Lozi political structure of a confederation of chiefdoms based on matrilineal clans, where witchcraft (arbitrated at poison trials) and divination were key in leadership. Moreover, several royals had stayed at Lukwakwa, and since Sipopa's departure were led by Imbua, the previous leader at Nyengo. Sipopa installed his sister Kandundu as Lwambi ruler at Nalolo, and then his daughter Kaiko after Kandundu's death in 1871, creating a dynasty of queens; in the pre-Kololo state, the eligibility of Lwambi rulers for kingship had caused several civil wars, which this negated due to women and their descendants being ineligible for kingship. In the late 1860s, the threat from the Ndebele diminished as they plunged into a succession crisis.

Njekwa, a prominent Lozi traditionalist, served as Ngambela and was highly popular, though his support for Sipopa unsettled other traditionalists who viewed Sipopa as too Kololo-influenced. A plot in 1869 to replace Sipopa with help from Lukwakwa failed, and he had Imbua killed. Sipopa viewed Njekwa as too powerful and attempted to curtail his power, which further alienated traditionalists when Njekwa died shortly after. Sipopa's rule shifted towards despotism, and he started ignoring the Kuta. He also came to rely on his diviner for fear of witchcraft; this backfired when a charm made by the diviner publicly failed, terminating his ritual power. In 1874, Sipopa moved his capital to modern-day Sesheke District, hoping to find support for his anti-traditionalist policies among the Tonga and Kololo-influenced groups. He came to rely upon the Toka and Subiya groups and traded more with Europeans, one of whom prevented Mthwakazi ruler Lobengula from raiding the Lozi. Despite this, Sipopa's cruelty made him unpopular. When Ngambela Mowa Mamili urged Sipopa to return to the Valley, he demanded that his opponents there be executed first. Following this, in 1876, Mamili led a rebellion against Sipopa, who was shot dead while attempting to flee.

Ngambela Mamili subsequently appointed Mwanawina II as Litunga. During his reign (1876–1878), a Kololo named Siluka/Siroque, who had fled to the west coast, returned to Kwandu to attempt a Kololo restoration, though Mwanawina quickly had him killed. Mamili manipulated the young Mwanawina in his hunger for power, presenting himself as ruler and alienating others from decision-making. (Note: Mamili is said to have walked in front of Mwananwina, demanded royal salutes, and helped himself to tribute before anyone else.) This angered Mwanawina and the Manduna, who captured and executed him. The successor Ngambela Ngenda Mufolofolo gained support from Mwanawina, though he too had a hunger for power akin to Mamili's. By this point, Mwanawina had also angered people by favouring matrilineal kin for appointments (who were ineligible for kingship), and by appointing his mother, a commoner, as regent at Nalolo (aggravating traditionalists). Southern groups gained influence over Nalolo, threatening civil war. The breaking point allegedly came when Mwanawina was discovered to be involved in a plot to replace elder Manduna with younger ones. Having faked a campaign against the Ila, three groups attacked Mwanawina. Ngambela Ngenda Mufolofolo was killed in battle, though Mwanawina escaped to the Batoka Plateau. One group, led by Mataa (who had participated in the rebellions against the Makololo and Sipopa), supported Sipopa's son Musiwa (popular among the Mbunda) for kingship, though the other two groups (led by Silumbu, brother of Njekwa, and Numwa, a warrior) supported Lubosi. (Note: Lubosi was born in hiding during the Makololo invasion, and his name means "the escaped one". He was a grandson of Mulambwa, and his father (Litia) had been killed by Sekeletu.) Lubosi was anointed in 1878 and he built his capital at Lealui, while his sister Matauka was made Lwambi ruler at Nalolo.

=== Lewanika's Revival and British annexation ===
On his accession to Litunga, Lubosi's position was disputed by several of Sipopa's sons, though not Musiwa, who had pre-emptively fled to Mwene Ciyengele's Mbunda. After uncovering a plot, Lubosi had three of Sipopa's sons executed, but was deceived by his messengers and the Mbunda into thinking Musiwa had died. On learning he was still alive in 1880, a furious Lubosi ordered more executions and sent out an army led by Numwa to capture Musiwa. The army killed many en route to Musiwa, capturing him and bringing him back to Lealui, where he was executed. (Note: Musiwa was reportedly strangled under a mupolota tree, which came to be known as Mupolota wa Musiwa.) The slaughter greatly antagonised the Mbunda, and from then on, Mbunda diviners acted in covert opposition. Meanwhile, the previous Litunga Mwanawina II had been soliciting support on the Batoka Plateau and invaded the Plain in 1879 with a combined force of Chikunda, Toka, and Subiya men. At the Lumbe River, Mwanawina's forces were defeated by Lubosi's, and Mwanawina fled back to Batoka; his fate is unknown, though rumours of his return circulated for several decades afterwards. Silumbu had become Ngambela and was highly popular. Mataa, who resented his lesser appointment, led opposition to Lubosi, and by 1884 openly levelled criticism. He organised the Mbunda and several factions sympathetic to Sipopa, as well as southern Manduna in modern-day Sesheke District, where he had an influential relative. Meanwhile, Lubosi's sister Matauka, Lwambi ruler at Nalolo, greatly angered people by executing a popular senior Induna, which even Ngambela Silumbu denounced. This turned many against Lubosi, including Numwa, who was related to the Induna. In 1884, a major uprising forced Lubosi to flee to the Mashi Valley, accompanied by Silumbu, while Matauka was held captive by the rebels. Mataa became Ngambela and invited Tatila Akufuna, son of Imbua, to move from Lukwakwa to assume the kingship.

Despite the rebels' decisive victory, cracks began to show owing to Akufuna's lack of experience and incompetence. Having lived at Lukwakwa, Akufuna only spoke Mbunda, and traditionalists began to view the rebellion as the death of the traditional state. Mataa, despite his satisfaction about gaining power at the expense of a weak ruler, lamented Akufuna's character and fashioned plans to replace him with Sikufele (grandson of Mulambwa), also from Lukwakwa, though this did little to placate traditionalists. Factions loyal to Lubosi began to form, and Matauka was assisted in her escape to rejoin her brother at Mashi. In early 1885, independent of Lubosi, loyalists from modern-day Nalolo District revolted, but were defeated at Mukoko. Mataa's attempt to capitalise on this victory was, however, foiled by his junior officers, who assisted the loyalists' escape and warned Lubosi of an imminent attack. On hearing of the revolt, Silumbu raised an army and marched to the Valley, while Lubosi solicited recruits to his army of Mashi from modern-day Nalolo and Sioma districts. Silumbu found the Valley undefended, as Mataa and Numwa had travelled to Lukwakwa to compel Sikufele to assume the kingship, and Akufuna had fled to Batoka. By the time they had returned, Lubosi and his army had rejoined Silumbu. Their combined forces decisively defeated the opposition and killed Sikufele, Mataa, and Numwa, though Silumbu also died. Lubosi reassumed the kingship and was given the praise name Lewanika, roughly meaning "conqueror".

Despite Lewanika's and the traditionalists' victory, the Mbunda and Kololo-influenced factions remained influential in Bulozi, and the Ndebele continued to threaten the kingdom's south. Lewanika embarked on a severe purge of all who were involved in the rebellion against him, executing leaders' wives and children as well. He also weaponised the Mbunda practices of witchcraft and divination to remove rivals. He appointed key figures in the Restoration and loyalist revolt into positions of authority, and settled some supporters near the former villages of rebel leaders. Lewanika also formed alliances with Khama of Bamangwato and Moremi of Tawana, whom he had grown close to while at Mashi. After suffering the purge, opposition in Sesheke shifted to Batoka, where Akufuna was. In 1888, a nobleman invaded Sesheke but failed to spark an uprising. Following this, Lewanika established a chieftaincy in Sesheke to increase his control there. In 1889, Lewanika descended on Lukwakwa with a large army and conquered them. Lewanika carried out many reforms seeking to revive pre-Kololo institutions and the Luyana state. The Muliu law ordered everyone to reassume the lands inhabited and owned by their ancestors in pre-Kololo times, and those who had settled in Bulozi after this were assigned lands and corresponding titles. Along with this, the old administrative units (Lilalo) were revived, and Makolo were once again brought under the Litunga's control. The Lozi raided their neighbours extensively to accrue slaves and cattle, and Lewanika repurposed the institution that produced governmental workers (Lifunga) to recruit labourers. (Note: This terrorised the population, and people hid their children out of fear.) Lewanika rebuilt the system of tribute from the forest communities, obligating unpaid labour, and institutionalised the redistribution of tribute throughout the kingdom. He also privileged the position of Litunga, making it the wealthiest in the kingdom, and increased the number of royals (Linabi) in the Kuta. (Note: Lewanika's palace (Kwandu) was built at Lealui in 1890, and was guarded by a police force (bo Imilema).) (Note: Lewanika chose Ngalama as his main protector, and fostered close relations with the keepers of the Royal Graves while also assigning each of his 17 wives to a grave.)

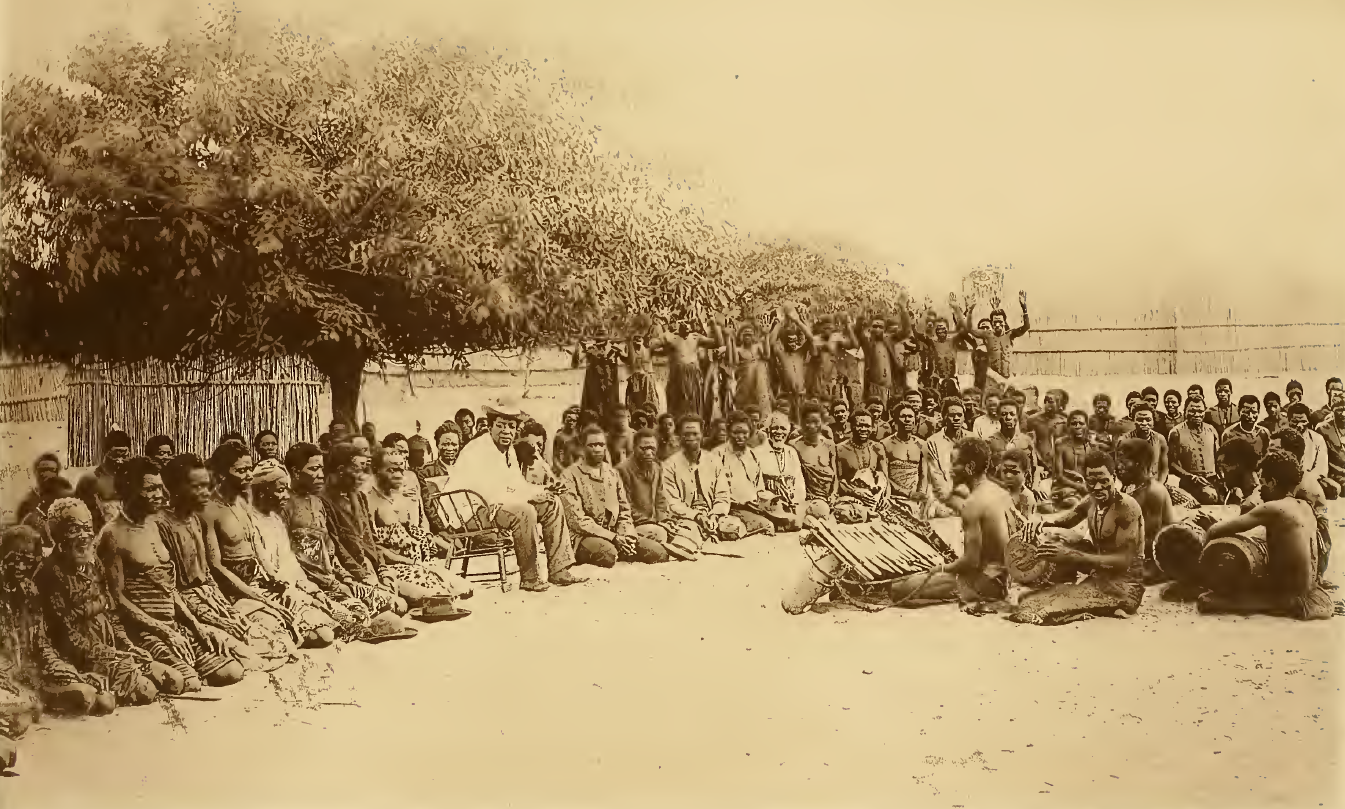
Lewanika and the Kuta, c. 1890

In the late 1880s, the Lozi kingdom found itself surrounded by Portuguese, British, and German colonial expansion amid the Scramble. In 1886, when François Coillard established a missionary station in Sefula, Lewanika (on the advice of Khama, who had come under British protection in 1885) approached him and requested to become a British protectorate. In 1889 Coillard (now a trusted friend) agreed to mediate and relayed this to the administrator of Bechuanaland, (Note: Coillard was reluctant to facilitate British protection initially because European encroachment in the form of the Boers on Lesotho (where he had been previously) had caused war and disrupted Christian missions there. Regardless, he came to view British rule as necessary to remodel the traditional state and spread Christianity as part of the 'civilising mission'.) and a mineral prospector arrived later that year with gifts of firearms etc. and negotiated the Ware Concession about gold prospecting rights in Sesheke and Batoka (billed as a first step towards protection), which was later sold to Cecil Rhodes' British South Africa Company (BSAC). Lewanika saw this as conducive to strengthening his authority and Lozi claims over the wider region by having British support, and wanted 'modernisation' to enrich the elite through Lozi systems rather than revolutionise or 'civilise' these systems. In 1890, the Lochner Concession was negotiated with the BSAC, granting mining rights in the whole country in exchange for defence and the establishment of schools and industries, while respecting Lozi sovereignty. Many traditionalists were strongly opposed to this, despite Lochner distributing gifts and bribes. Under pressure, Lewanika rejected the Concession and lamented the missionaries as "liars" and "secret agents". (Note: Ngambela Mwauluka later declared that Lewanika would forfeit the kingship if he converted to Christianity.) Upon learning Lochner had misrepresented himself as brokering for the British Crown instead of a company (meaning protection was indirect), Lewanika was furious and felt further betrayed when British residence and other conditions did not materialise.

Meanwhile, tension between Lewanika and the diviners had been building until 1892, (Note: Although Lewanika had initially found the Mbunda practices of witchcraft and divination helpful, in 1887 the diviners had targeted one of his close friends, who was subsequently killed.) when the Mbunda diviners targeted Lewanika directly. They claimed that he was responsible for a smallpox epidemic and the lack of rain. Several Manduna used this to further their opposition to the Lochner Concession, and Lewanika was accused of having sold the kingdom. Lewanika later ordered the diviners to be strangled, though this was prevented by Coillard's intervention, and from then on set about dismantling Mbunda influences. The grave threat from the Northern Ndebele dissipated after their defeat by the BSAC in 1893, somewhat restoring Lewanika's trust in the Company but also warning of the danger it exemplified.

By the end of the 19th century, the unyielding inevitability of European expansion had dawned on Lewanika, and he feared military invasion. In the 1890s, cattle plague and locusts caused famine, though this was offset by Lewanika's extensive canal system and expansion of agriculture. An influenza epidemic also hit the kingdom. Traditionalists were disempowered, and, after Mbunda diviners had begun targeting Europeans, Lewanika banned witchcraft accusations. In 1895, the Portuguese occupied some of the Lozi's western territory following the Anglo-Portuguese agreement to set their claims' borders at the Zambezi. Lewanika appealed to the British Crown. The first British resident arrived in 1897, (Note: The resident, Robert Coryndon, addressed the Kuta, saying that he had no interest in interfering in internal Lozi affairs, and wrote to Lewanika, saying "You are definitely under British protection. You gave a concession to the British South Africa Company. Afterwards you were afraid you had sold your country. Do not believe this: you have not sold your country.") and in 1898, the Lawley Concession was signed (without missionaries present). Whilst formalising protectorate status, it encroached on Lozi sovereignty by giving the BSAC some administrative rights over the Plain along with mining rights, and Lewanika was obliged to suppress witchcraft and slavery. The 1899 Order of Council treaty signed by Queen Victoria stipulated that the Lozi could maintain their laws and customs "except so far as the same may be incompatible with the due exercise of Her Majesty's power and jurisdiction".

=== Colonial and postcolonial periods ===
With the 1899 Order, Lewanika lost powers over territory outside of the Valley (Bulozi proper) to the BSAC, and over the following years his authority was eroded. Company control over the Litunga was extended in exchange for support against traditionalist Manduna. A hut tax was established by the Company in 1902 and was strictly enforced, gravely affecting commoners; Company policy ignored development and intended for Bulozi to supply cheap labour on 'white-owned' farms and mines in Southern Africa, leading to out-migration. In 1905 and 1911 respectively, the kingdom lost territory in the west to Portuguese Angola and the Caprivi Strip to German South West Africa. In 1906, slavery was abolished, emancipating a significant portion of the population that could now pay taxes. That same year, the BSAC took over the granting of land to settlers, belying the meaning of Litunga as "owner of the land". The 1911 Order of Council merged Barotziland–North-Western Rhodesia and North-Eastern Rhodesia to form the protectorate of Northern Rhodesia, within which the kingdom effectively became a province. In 1914, the BSAC took over most of the Kuta's judicial functions.Throughout all this, Lewanika continued to seek direct protectorate status from the British Crown, but his efforts were unsuccessful, and dreams of a Lozi-British alliance faded. Amid a severe cattle epidemic, Lewanika died in 1916.

Lewanika was succeeded by his son Yeta III. Yeta and his generation's Manduna were mission-educated and highly competent in legal settings, and started lobbying for the Company rule to end and the return of Lozi rights per Lewanika's treaties. In 1924, administration was transferred directly to the British Crown, which favoured indirect rule and the maintenance of the status quo. After the British threatened removal of the Lozi elites' privileges (which were necessary for class differentiation), Yeta and the Kuta resolved that they would focus on maintaining the special status of Barotseland within Northern Rhodesia and that of the ruling class. (Note: In 1933, Yeta established Limulunga as the capital during high floods.) Bulozi remained poverty-stricken with little employment opportunities other than fishing amid the Crown's continuation of using the region for labour supply, which had caused large numbers of people to leave for mining in South Africa and the Copperbelt, as well as farming in Southern Rhodesia (now Zimbabwe). The 1930s saw jobs everywhere dry up, as well as floods, droughts, locusts (causing four crop failures in a row), cattle disease, and famine, leading to many Lozis being imprisoned or made to do forced labour for failing to pay the poll tax. In 1935, the Lozi government was legally formalised as the "Native Government" for Barotse Province despite opposition, becoming the "Barotse Native Government" (BNG). In 1945, Yeta abdicated and was replaced by his half-brother Imwiko. During Imwiko's reign, the Provincial Commissioner enacted reforms of the BNG, reviving a sub-council of the National Council/Kuta (the Katengo Kuta) that would be elected by regional councils and advise the Kuta, angering Manduna.

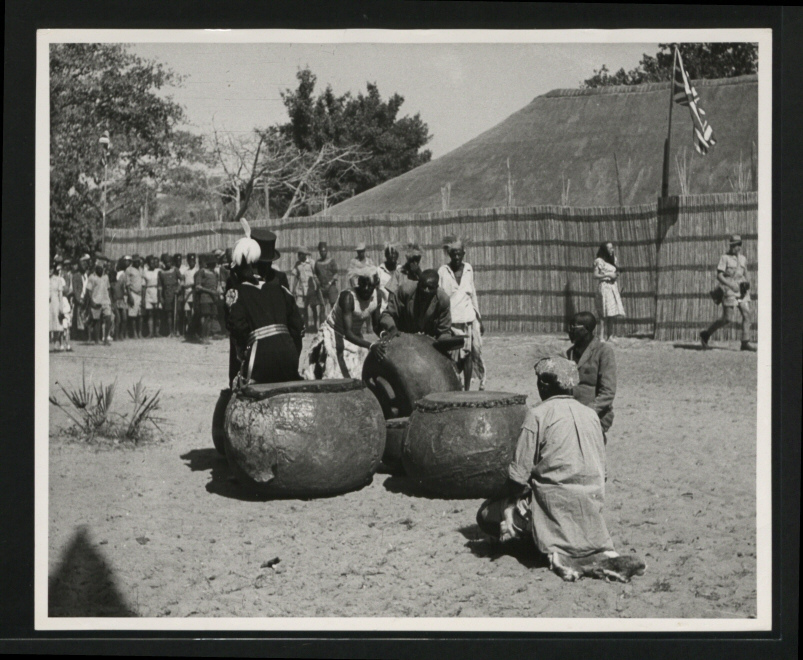
Installation of Mwanawina III

Imwiko was succeeded by Mwanawina III (a son of Lewanika) in 1948. Despite the elite being factionalised, they were united in opposition to merging Northern and Southern Rhodesia. Ideas of seceding from such a merger and becoming a separate protectorate began gaining currency, though Mwanawina instead sought the restoration of powers and distanced the kingdom from nationalist resistance. In return for some rights, Mwanawina supported the establishment of the Federation of Rhodesia and Nyasaland, plummeting his popularity with the public; people began to view the BNG as a corrupt, nepotic, and exclusionary government. (Note: In 1959, Mwanawina received a knighthood (KBE) from Queen Elizabeth II, becoming the only African in the region to do so.) In 1960, Kenneth Kaunda came to lead the United National Independence Party (UNIP) after his militant nationalist party was banned by the colonial government. Lozi elites viewed Kaunda's nationalists as "extremists" and, in 1960, restated their desire to secede from Northern Rhodesia. In 1962, the British government allowed Nyasaland and Southern Rhodesia to secede from the Federation but not Barotseland, prompting Lozi elites to accuse the British of breaking their treaties with Lewanika. In the crucial 1962 elections, royalists standing in Bulozi were overwhelmingly defeated by the nationalists of UNIP following a complacent campaign. The subsequent UNIP-NRANC government sought to reform the BNG; Lozi elites appealed to the British, but they did not want to antagonise nationalists nor finance the secession. In the election for the Katengo Kuta, UNIP presented secession as economically unviable and won every seat. Lozi elites changed their policy to seek semi-independent status within Zambia. Despite conciliatory relations, UNIP refused to mention Barotseland's status in the new constitution.

In May 1964, during formal discussions in London regarding independence, Mwanawina and Kaunda signed a separate treaty, the Barotseland Agreement 1964, granting the kingdom special status within an independent Zambia. Britain also signed it, but only as a witness, a distinction of which Mwanawina was unaware. In October 1964, Zambia gained independence. The central government commissioned development projects and brought the Kuta within Lusaka's jurisdiction, which caused political conflict and was received by the Lozi elite as encroaching on their rights and violating the 1964 Agreement, of which Gerald Caplan wrote that the government had no intention of upholding. From 1965, Lozis began to blame the central government for the lack of material benefits since independence. The Kuta refused all cooperation with the central government, prompting the government to introduce the Local Government Bill, replacing the Kuta with five district councils. Mwanawina lost all his special rights (such as appointing councillors, the treasury, and vetoing of legislation) except for the allocation of land. The Chiefs Act also allowed the central government to revoke recognition of any chief, which now explicitly included the Litunga. The Kuta was outraged and discussed methods of resistance, and also appealed to the British for help. Popular opposition to the central government grew in Bulozi, and Lozi high-ranking members in UNIP were gradually sidelined while Bemba influence grew.

Mwanawina died in 1968 and was replaced by Godwin Mbikusita, a purported son of Lewanika and hardline secessionist. In the 1968 elections, the Zambian African National Congress (ZANC) won the most seats in Bulozi with 61% of the vote. In 1969, Kaunda proclaimed that Zambia was at "economic war" with Britain, South Africa, and the United States. He nationalised the copper industry and enacted several reforms, including removing the Litunga's right to assign land. Kaunda personally took control of UNIP, citing internecine divisions. The Barotse Province was renamed as "Western Province" and was given the same status as Zambia's other provinces. Later in 1969, the government passed a bill that officially revoked the 1964 Agreement to fierce opposition, though the position of Litunga was still recognised by the central government.

Zambia transitioned to a one-party state in 1973, and throughout the 1970s and 1980s, discourse about secession remained muted. The Litunga sought an amiable relationship with the government, while people in Bulozi became disillusioned with politics. Mbikusita was succeeded by Yeta IV in 1977, who was appointed to the Central Committee to represent Western Province. People had little appetite for secession amid the grave insecurity caused by the Angolan War and South African Defence Force attacks on Western Province, where SWAPO was basing its guerrilla war against South Africa. Following Namibia's independence from South Africa in 1994, Lozis founded the Caprivi Liberation Army (CLA) (whose leadership descended from Manduna who had been appointed by Lewanika). The CLA attacked the government in Caprivi in 1999, though they were quickly defeated.

In Zambia Lozi figures played key roles in the re-establishment of multi-party democracy in 1990 through the Movement for Multi-Party Democracy (MMD). Following the 1991 elections, Frederick Chiluba formed the new government. Despite MMD receiving overwhelming support from Lozis in the elections, President Chiluba (himself a Bemba) did little to placate Lozi voters. Tensions grew between the Barotse Royal Establishment (BRE) and the central government, and secession gained popular support amid public demonstrations. In 1995, the government passed the Lands Act which de facto transferred the Litunga's informal right to allocate land (which he had retained despite its formal removal in 1969) to the president. The Kuta responded by stipulating that the 1964 Agreement be incorporated into the constitution, or the kingdom would return to its pre-1964 status. Currents of militant resistance grew, culminating in the Barotse Patriot Front (BPF), which in 1998 stated they would engage in armed conflict if Barotseland was not permitted to secede; after supporting the CLA in the 1999 Caprivi Conflict, they were banned by the Zambian government. A son of Mbikusita founded a Lozi separatist political party called Agenda for Zambia (AZ); in the 1996 general election, AZ won a seat in Bulozi, though their presidential candidate only won 27% of the vote in Western Province and 2.6% overall.

Yeta IV was succeeded by Lubosi Imwiko II. In 2005, the Mung'omba Constitution Review Commission recommended that the government and the BRE "resolve the outstanding issue of the Barotseland Agreement", after which President Mwanawasa commissioned the National Constitutional Conference, which reported in 2010. The BRE opposed the draft constitution because it did not refer to the 1964 Agreement. Just before the anniversary of Zambian independence in October 2010, public protests in Mongu against the draft constitution turned into rioting, to which the police employed tear gas and gunfire to disperse the crowd. These riots continued until climaxing in January 2011 when police killed two people and injured and arrested many more. The BRE distanced itself from the Lozi separatist organisations involved, and stressed the difference between restoring the 1964 Agreement and secession. In the 2011 general election, Michael Sata promised to "implement that agreement within 90 days" during his campaign, and later won the presidency. Despite this, the 1964 Agreement was not implemented. In 2012, the Kuta passed a resolution stating "We now inform Zambia and the international community that we finally accept the unilateral nullification and the abrogation of the Barotseland Agreement 1964 ... we can no longer be obliged to honor an international Agreement that the other party has nullified and abrogated, which has reverted us to our original status" (though the Litunga did not support this). The argument was that since the 1964 Agreement had abolished all treaties before it, and given that the Agreement itself had been terminated, Zambia had no legal basis to govern Barotseland, and the kingdom would revert to its pre-1889 sovereign status. Activists have since lobbied the African Union and the United Nations with little success. Barotseland joined the Unrepresented Nations and Peoples Organization (UNPO) in 2013, and as of 2019 it was engaged in a process to petition the International Court of Justice (ICJ).

== Government ==
The state was headed by a Litunga (king, lit. 'owner of the land'). Only male patrilineal descendants of Mbuyu were eligible to the kingship, which regularly caused succession crises as candidates vied for the kingship. The government was seated in the capital, and consisted of legislative, judicial, consultative, and administrative bodies. The Mulongwanji (National Council or Kuta) included Manduna ("Councillors", sing. Induna) and was headed by the Ngambela (Prime Minister), and dealt with general national matters such as law-making or war. It was the Kuta's role to appoint a new Litunga, and candidates depended on support from senior Manduna. The Ngambela acted as both the Litunga's spokesperson and as the principal representative of the people. The Natamoyo ("Master/Mother of Life") held a special role where they could veto any decision made by the Kuta or Litunga if it were deemed harsh or unjust, and their residence served as a sanctuary for anyone set to be executed. The Litunga could promote or demote Manduna, but not the Ngambela or Natamoyo. Another centre of power existed in the south (called Lwambi), ruled by a member of the royal family, and was subordinate to the north (called Namuso); the southern ruler had representative Manduna in the Mulongwanji, and the Litunga had some in the Lwambi Kuta.

The Mulongwanji consisted of several factions of Manduna: the Makwambuyu (seated on the Litunga's right in the Kuta) was composed of Lozi aristocrats, including the Ngambela and Natamoyo, and it appointed the kingdom's administrative heads; the Likombwa (seated on the Litunga's left) advanced the Litunga's interests in opposition to the Makwambuyu, which represented the public; (Note: The head of the Likombwa served as the Litunga's representative, and was the target for criticism and punishments related to the Litunga's policies, which weren't permitted to be directed at him. The Likombwa was possibly repurposed by Mulambwa (the tenth Litunga) to serve his interests.) and the Linabi, which consisted of the royal family. Manduna in the Mulongwanji also comprised several inner Kuta or councils, namely the Sikalo Kuta (composed of the most senior members of the factions), Saa Kuta (a less senior version of the Sikalo), Katengo Kuta (its purpose in early times is unclear), (Note: After the kingdom's restoration, Lewanika fashioned the Katengo to arbitrate in secret on witchcraft, plots, and executions.) and Situmbo sa Mulonga (the Litunga's personal hand-picked council which offered him advice). (Note: In the literature, Kuta can refer to any of the national councils, but usually it refers to the Mulongwanji.)

Appointments to governmental positions generally came through the Lifunga institution, where the Litunga (or representatives of him) travelled throughout the kingdom and brought child prodigies back to the capital. The children (boys and girls) lived in royal or senior households and underwent apprenticeships, later gaining responsibilities and duties based on merit. Girls did domestic work in the royal household, and some became Anatambumu ("Mothers of the King"), who comprised a council headed by the Queen Mother (Makoshi), which engaged in governing. The Makoshi had the power to veto the Litunga's decisions. In the late-19th century, during Lewanika's reign, women were excluded from government, and the Lifunga institution was expanded to recruit labourers, causing people to hide their children out of fear.

Makolo (sing. Likolo) were groups of men that served as armies or labourers and initially corresponded to territories. They were each headed by an Induna, who lived at the capital and discussed policy with the Litunga and his advisors through a representative. Makolo likely began as bands of followers and were created and employed by members of the royal dynasty, though over time they all came under the control of the Litunga, who also appointed their Manduna (sometimes as a reward for service or bravery shown). At one point, all women, men, and children were part of a Likolo, which was determined by their father's or guardian's association, meaning they generally comprised patrilineal kin. Makolo engaged in work that depended on their territories' resources and could raid or work on public construction for the Litunga if needed. It was tradition for each new Litunga to create a Likolo. The southern ruler had control of subgroups of Makolo (Lwambi Makolo), though the ruler's authority over these was superseded by that of the Litunga's.

=== Administration ===
The kingdom was divided into Silalo (sing. Lilalo), headed by Manduna, who were appointed by the Litunga and approved by village heads. The Lwambi ruler had control over some Silalo Manduna, though the division between Lwambi and Namuso rule did not perfectly align with territorial units. A Silalo Induna had a regional Kuta (council) composed of village headmen, which people could spectate, and people were mandated to attend when a law was being made to gauge public opinion. Silalo Induna also had a corresponding Induna in the Mulongwanji to report matters to when they visited, who in turn reported to the Ngambela. Silalo themselves were composed of several Silalanda (sing. Lilalanda), which were groupings of villages (munzi). A Lilalanda was led by the most senior headman of its villages, who also had their own Kuta and resolved disputes between villages. Villages typically accommodated kin, and their headmen had to be accepted by the village's family heads and approved by the Litunga. It was the responsibility of the headmen to resolve minor disputes between people and ensure people's needs were met. Anthropologist Max Gluckman wrote in 1941 that these divisions only concerned land use and not governance of people, citing the unstable settlement of the Plain because of seasonal flooding. He considered the Makolo to serve as the kingdom's administrative units. Mutumba Mainga disagrees with this and says that settlements on the Plain were permanent, citing lengthy family histories about landholdings and villages. She also says that Makolo often corresponded to Silalo because they were both dependent on kinship.

=== Ideology of kingship ===
Lozi tradition holds that members of the royal dynasty have divine ancestry due to their descent from Mbuyu and Nyambe, imbuing them with mali a silena (royalty), which determined eligibility for kingship. A new Litunga underwent an elaborate installation ritual (coliso), which involved purification rituals, before being presented to the public. Some rites were carried out at Mbuyu's grave in Makono and Mboo's in Imwambo (afterwards, the new Litunga made sacrifices at all royal graves to seek their endorsement). The Litunga was bound to ritual seclusion and spoke only through an intermediary. After death, a Litunga was believed to become more powerful and remain able to affect people's lives, acting as a mediator between the living and Nyambe. The emphasis on powerful royal ancestral spirits served to protect the living Litunga from being blamed for disasters or mistakes. A group of families lived near where a deceased Litunga chose to be buried, and one person took on the position of Nomboti or Nameto. The Nomboti tended to the deceased Litunga's grave, appeased him with sacrifices, and acted as an intermediary between him and the public. Sacrifices were placed on the Limbwata (an opening in the grave), and the deceased Litunga's spirit was believed to be consulted via the Nomboti for major policy decisions and the installation of a new monarch. Traditionally, fires were put out after a monarch's death to symbolise the death of the nation, and only relit once the new monarch lights a fire.

== Economy ==
The Litunga was responsible for public infrastructure, such as building mounds to protect settlements from flooding, or canals for drainage and transport. People in the kingdom had to pay tribute to the Litunga in the form of part of their catch or harvest (called Mubingu). During Lewanika's reign, around a quarter or a third of the population were slaves captured in raids or received in tribute (buzike), who undertook public construction or agricultural work on state farms (bonamukau). The Litunga redistributed some tribute to areas where certain goods were lacking and needed.

The Plain had plenty of game, fowl, and fish. Large herds of cattle were kept, and milk was highly regarded (sour milk was sometimes mixed with honey to make Ilya). During flood season, cattle were herded out of the Plain to valleys or small plains amid the forest. Types of fishing included spearfishing (ku waya), with traps and dams (makuko and bwalelo), and with fences (liandi). Small fry (nakatenge) were caught with baskets (mashino). Communal hunts, sometimes led by the Litunga, involved trapping antelope on islands during the annual floods which were killed to make skins and dried meat. Sorghum (makonga) was the principal crop before being eclipsed by maize in the 20th century, and fields were fertilised by cattle. The migration of the Mbundu into the Plain in the early-19th century introduced cassava, millet, and yams to the Luyana. Farming at the edges of the Plain by seepage areas was likely popularised among the Luyana/Lozi by the Mbunda, though the Nkoya and Makwanga had developed the technique for it earlier. Hunting, fishing, keeping cattle, and tribute labour such as canal-building were men's work, while cooking and catching small fry were women's. Regarding agriculture, men typically did sowing while women did hoeing, though women later came to do both.

According to 19th-century records, iron was largely taken from the beds of streams, rivers, and swamps, and smelting was predominantly specialised in by the Totela. Roles tended to be hereditary, and products included spears, axes, hoes, blades, and hammers. Pottery was largely undertaken by women. The Ndundulu, Makwanga, and Mbunda specialised in woodworking. The Lozi crafted dugout canoes from mukwa trees, reportedly having learnt their techniques from the Totela. Baskets were usually made from grass, baobab fibre, or bark. Mats were made from reeds knotted together with bark; the Makoma made tight mats out of papyrus that were waterproof and could be used for the construction of huts. Huts were typically made of mats and reeds. Usually, men would lay a cement foundation and craft the roof, while women constructed the walls.

The communities of the Bulozi Floodplain and those of the forests relied upon each other for certain goods; from the forest communities, those of the Plain imported wood, canoes, bark to make rope, honey, and beeswax, among others. The communities of the Plain exported to those of the forests cattle, milk, and fish. Initially, this trade was conducted via barter, though after Ngombala's conquests, he established a tribute system (Namba) wherein the forest communities were obligated to send some of what they produced to the capital. Another institution called Maketiso involved the communities sending young men and women to the Plain when requested to meet labour demand. These systems were overseen by Lindumeleti (sing. Ndumeleti), who reported to the Litunga if they were not carried out, which was often met with force.

== Society and culture ==
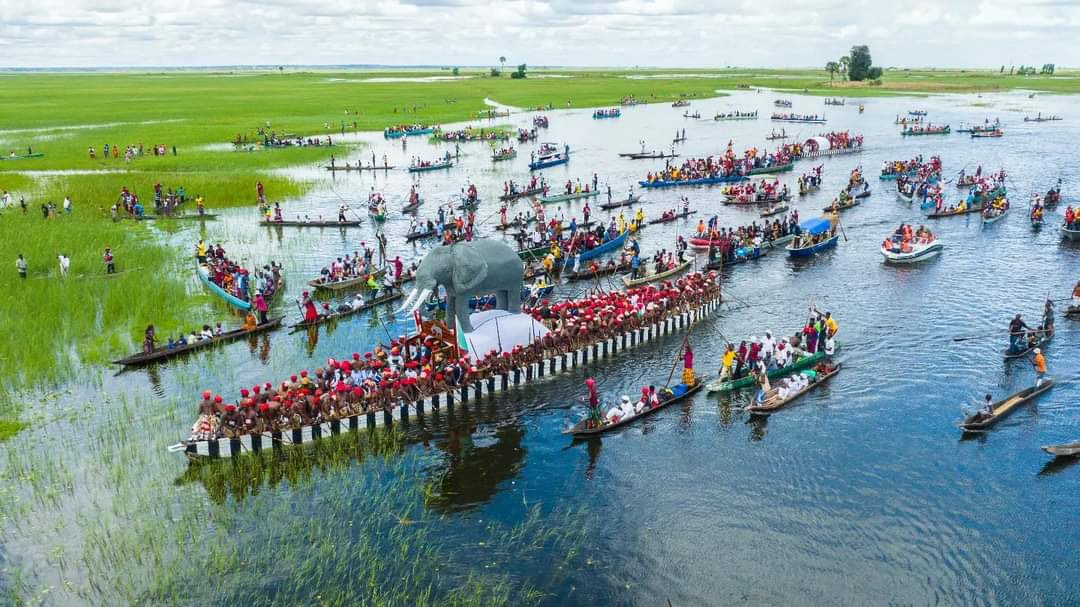
The Nalikwanda during the Kuomboka Ceremony in 2016

All people in the kingdom were considered mutanga (servants) while the Litunga was mutanga wa sichaba (servant of the nation/people), and each person bore reciprocal social responsibility. All land was believed to belong to the Litunga, though people (including slaves) had a right to own land with the condition that it was used (unused land was returned to the Litunga to re-grant). National hunts (Lisula) were held annually and led by the Litunga. Cattle conferred social status, and there were numerous royal herds (likomu za mbuwa). The Kuomboka Ceremony took place during seasonal high floods and involved moving to higher land. It is said to have dated back to the 17th century, when there was a great flood called meyi a lungwangwa. Held annually, the date of the ceremony was based on the height of the water and the moon's phase. The Litunga consulted the Royal Graves beforehand, after which the royal Maoma drums were sounded to call the paddlers. Barges received praise names from Litunga, (Note: According to tradition, Mboo's barge was called Sitandamwalye, Inyambo's Lyamashandi, and Ngalama's Notila. Yeta II used Notila during Kuomboka, but also built a barge called Nalikwanda. Mulambwa's barge was reportedly called Njonjolo, though he is said to have maintained Nalikwanda.) though since the reign of Yeta III (1916–1945), all 'state barges' have been called Nalikwanda. (Note: The elephant structure on Nalikwanda's canopy was first added by Mbikusita Lewanika II in the 1970s. Tradition attributes the royal symbol of the elephant to Mulambwa, who is said to have ridden one to become heir to the Litunga.)

Infants were believed to embody ancestral spirits and were initially given names that had negative connotations. During the first few years, they were protected by charms and developed without being disciplined "like a wild tree" until they stopped suckling, at which time they were named by an old relative. From the ages of five or six, children worked hard. Boys underwent initiation school (milaka) at the ages of nine or eleven until late-teens or mid-twenties, which primarily involved learning how to keep cattle, as well as crafts such as woodcarving. Girls' initiation school (sikenge) was held after their first menstruation (believed to be ancestors gifting them with the capacity for parenthood), and involved entering seclusion and learning the knowledge and skills for social, religious, and economic life. The Luyana/Lozi did not have clans, though they did have ancestral names called mishiku (sing. mushiku) given to them from their great-grandparents, where people having the same mushiku meant that they had ancestors who bore that mushiku. (Note: In the present day, mishiku do not constitute groups, nor do people with the same mushiku have obligations to each other, though such people regard each other as kin.)

Meals typically consisted of buhobe (hot porridge made of cereal or roots) and busunso (a sauce that can be made of fish, sour milk (mafi), meat, sweet potato, groundnuts, or pumpkin). At dusk, people brought their cooked food to the headman's courtyard, who distributed it among the community in a practice called silyela, where men, women, children, and slaves ate separately in groups (this practice has since largely been replaced by dining in nuclear families). A custom called likute (roughly meaning "politeness") involved a variety of greetings incorporating gestures, hand clapping, and phrases; proverbs allude to popularity's importance for self-preservation.

A new year was accompanied by the start of agricultural work. Lozi years were 13 months long. A month's length was determined by the moon's waxing and waning, and they were grouped into seasons. Seasonal floods meant that settlements were built on termite mounds (mazulu) and artificial mounds (liuba), though people were often forced into the forests at the height of the flooding season. Mounds bore villages and had small fields attached to them. Villages were socially organised into courtyards (malapa), with adjacent huts (Note: Huts came in three forms: maongo (sing. longo) were rectangular, built in mifelo style using saplings; litungu (sing. situngu) were circular with thatched conical roofs; masaela were Kololo-style, large, and circular, with double-concentric walls and were favoured by elites.) to a courtyard constituting a subsistent unit. When a town moved, huts were deconstructed and carried to the new location. Villages comprised kin and were permanently settled, typically through many generations; though people dispersed widely during high floods, they tended to regard their settlements on the Plain as their homes. The only disease common to the Luyana in early times was leprosy (called "fire of God"); lepers were quarantined in a hut downwind of the village.

The Kuta controlled the transmission of history through institutions such as the Royal Graves (Litino), titles and positions which had their own traditions, and the Royal Band (Bambeti) composed of around 20 members. The Royal Band played praise songs and narrative songs, and could give cryptic advice or criticism to the current Litunga. Their instruments included the silimba (a gourd-resonated xylophone), ng'oma drum, and two higher-pitched double-pegged drums. Lozi music genres include lisboma, considered to be the Lozi's national music, and makwasha, which is sung by everyone and played on a kahanzi (lamellophone). The Luyana had two main ceremonial dances: Ngomalume (a war dance performed by men) and Liwale (performed by women), which were not accompanied by singing and were performed at royal events. Other dances included Liimba, Lishemba, and Sipelu, all accompanied by singing and often drums, which were performed in the evening. Siyemboka was introduced by the Mbunda and was performed at beer parties, festivals, ceremonies, and girls' initiations.

=== Religion ===
Lozi traditional religion involves Nyambe (also called Mulimu), royal and non-royal ancestral spirits (balimu), and shadows/spirits (miluti). The two 'denominations' of Lozi religion, the Nyambe cult and the institution of the Royal Graves (Litino), complemented each other (a third 'denomination' focussing on witchcraft and divination arrived later in the 19th century). Nyambe is regarded as the Creator and First Cause, and as being omnipotent and omniscient, as indicated by several proverbs. (Note: Such proverbs include Mulimu ha lata ("God willing") and Ku ziba Mulimu ("Only God knows").) Tradition holds that Nyambe made the first man, Kamunu, who was punished by Nyambe every time he killed an animal. Eventually, Nyambe is driven up into heaven by humans' combativeness and intelligence (which they used to learn from him). After this, Nyambe was symbolised by the Sun, to which prayers were directed at sunrise. The act of paying homage was called shoelala, while ritual sacrifice was called sombo. The cult of Nyambe is thought to have originated in modern-day Kalabo District, where there is a hill named lilunda la Nyambe ("the hill of Nyambe") that is believed to have been where Nyambe and his wife Nasilele lived, with other nearby landmarks also associated with the tradition. The Nyambe cult is found throughout the Plain, meaning the hill may have been a centre from which it spread; due to little knowledge of the hill throughout the Plain today, its sacredness would have faded over time, possibly because the later royal dynasty did not adhere to the cult.

Another tradition attributes the origin of the Royal Graves to the first Litunga, Mboo, whose spirit is said to have chosen to move from his grave in Ikatulamwa (his capital) to Imwambo. Nyambe is still regarded as the Creator, but the royals are the first people. In this 'denomination', prayers and sacrifices are aimed towards the spirits of deceased Litunga rather than Nyambe (see § Ideology of kingship). Ancestral spirits were believed to be able to influence and affect the present. The first reference in tradition to sacrifices being devoted to the ancestral Litunga is during Ngombala's reign (the 6th Litunga). Ancestors of non-royals played a similar role at the familial level and were worshiped during family crises or to improve health, prosperity, and fortune. Failure to care for them was believed to cause illness or misfortune.

Witchcraft, divination, and traditional medicine were popularised among the Lozi during their time in exile after the Kololo conquest in the mid-19th century, where they were separated from their sacred sites and came into close contact with the Mbunda and Luvale, who dealt in these practices. Mutumba Mainga says that witchcraft and divination "may be described as a denial, rather than a form, of religion", as they reject sacredness and worship. Monica Wilson wrote that witchcraft was the inversion of accepted behavioural norms, and the "wilful misdirection of the mystical powers" innate to each person. In this 'denomination', misfortune, illness, and death were attributed to witchcraft and sorcery performed by people, and divination sought to identify and cleanse these people and to give insight into the future, serving to give adherents control over their lives. Healers (naka) and witches (muloi) were differentiated by their motives and intent.

== List of rulers ==
The Lozi kingdom is divided into north and south. The north (called Namuso) is ruled by a man, the Litunga or "King", while the south (called Lwambi) is ruled by a woman, the Litunga la Mboela or "Queen of the south", and is subordinate to the north.

=== Litunga ===
The following regnal list is largely taken from African States and Rulers, 3rd ed. (2006) and Max Gluckman. The locations of the Royal Graves (Litino, sing. Sitino) are largely derived from Adolphe Jalla's Litaba za Sicaba sa Malozi ("History of the Lozi Nation"), first published in 1909 or 1910.

No.	Litunga	Reign	Gravesite	Notes
—	Mbuyu	?	Makono	One strain of tradition says that Mbuyu was the last of a dynasty of 15 queens over the course of three generations, which had Nasilele (wife of Nyambe) as the first queen
1.	Mboo Mwanasilunda Mulunda	17th century	Imwambo	Mboo was buried at his capital Ikatulamwa, though his spirit accordingly moved to Imwambo. Inuwa was Ngambela (Prime Minister). Mwanambinyi's sitino is at Imatongo
2.	Inyambo	?	Liondo	
3.	Yeta I	?	Namanda	
4.	Ngalama	?	Kwandu	
5.	Yeta II	?	Nandopu	
6.	Ngombala	?	Ñundu	Ñundu is next to Ngombala's capital of Nakaywe
7.	Yubya	?	Namayula	
8.	Mwanawina I (also "Musanawina")	?	Lienenu	
9.	Mwananyanda (also "Musananyanda")	? – c. 1780	Kasiku	
10.	Mulambwa	c. 1780 – c. 1830	Lilundu	
11.	Silumelume (and Mubukwanu)	c. 1830 – c. 1838	Namaweshi (Silumelume)	Civil war
12.	Mubukwanu	c. 1838 – c. 1841	? (possibly Nambi)	
?	Imasiku	c. 1841 – 1860	?	Ruler in exile at Lukwakwa
	Sipopa and Njekwa	1860 – 1864	—	Joint regents
13.	Sipopa	1864 – August 1876	Nalwenge	Njekwa was Ngambela until 1871
—	Mowa Mamili	August 1876 – October 1876	—	Regent
14.	Mwanawina II	October 1876 – May 1878	? (possibly Sikongo)	
—	Vacant	May 1878 – August 1878	—	
15.	Lewanika (also "Lubosi")	August 1878 – August 1884	—	1st reign, Silumbu was Ngambela
16.	Tatila Akufuna	September 1884 – July 1885	?	Usurper, Mataa was Ngambela
—	Vacant	July 1885 – November 1885	—	
15.	Lewanika	November 1885 – February 1916	Nanikelako	2nd reign and the last sovereign ruler, Mwauluka was Ngambela until 1898
—	Mokamba	February 1916 – March 1916	—	Regent
17.	Yeta III (also "Litia")	March 1916 – June 1945	Mulumbo	
—	Shemakone Kalonga Wina	June 1945 – June 1946	—	Regent (1st time)
18.	Imwiko Lewanika (also "Imwiko I")	June 1946 – June 1948	Naloyela	
—	Shemakone Kalonga Wina	June 1948 – August 1948	—	Regent (2nd time)
19.	Mwanawina III	August 1948 – November 1968	Sikuli	
—	Hastings Noyoo	November 1968 – December 1968	—	Regent
20.	Lewanika II (also "Godwin Mbikusita")	December 1968 – 1977	Lishekandinde	
21.	Ilute (also "Yeta IV")	1977 – July 2000	Ndowana	
22.	Lubosi Imwiko II	October 2000 – present (as of 2025)	—	Mukela Manyando is Ngambela as of 2025

=== Litunga la Mboela ===
The following is a list of holders of the Nalolo 'southern kingship' (Lwambi) according to Lawrence Flint, Mutumba Mainga, and Max Gluckman. In this list of rulers, six from Mbanga to Mubukwanu are male, and the rest are all female.

No.	Ruler	Reign	Notes
1.	Notulu		Daughter of Ngombala
2.	Mbanga		Brother of Notulu and father of Mwanawina I
3.	Yubya (not Yubya)		
4.	Nakambe		
5.	Mwanamatia		Lost a civil war against Mwananyanda
6.	Kusio		Lost the Litunga position to Mulambwa
7.	Mubukwanu		Won the Litunga position against Silumelume
8.	Kandundu	1864–1871	Sister of Sipopa, d. 1871; from then onwards the position was held by women which prevented a Lwambi ruler's claim to the Litunga position
9.	Kaiko	1871–1876	Daughter of Sipopa
10.	Mwangala	1876–1878	Daughter of Mwanawina II
11.	Matauka	1878–1884	Sister of Lewanika
12.	Maibiba	1884–1885	Sister of Tatila Akufuna
11.	Matauka	1885–1934	Her second reign
13.	Atangambuyu	1934–1936	Daughter of Matauka
14.	Mulima	1936–1959	Daughter of Yeta III
15.	Makwibi	1959–2011	Daughter of Mwanawina III
16.	Mbuyu	2011–present (as of 2021)	Sister of Imwiko II
