= Kuomboka =

Traditional annual ceremony in Zambia

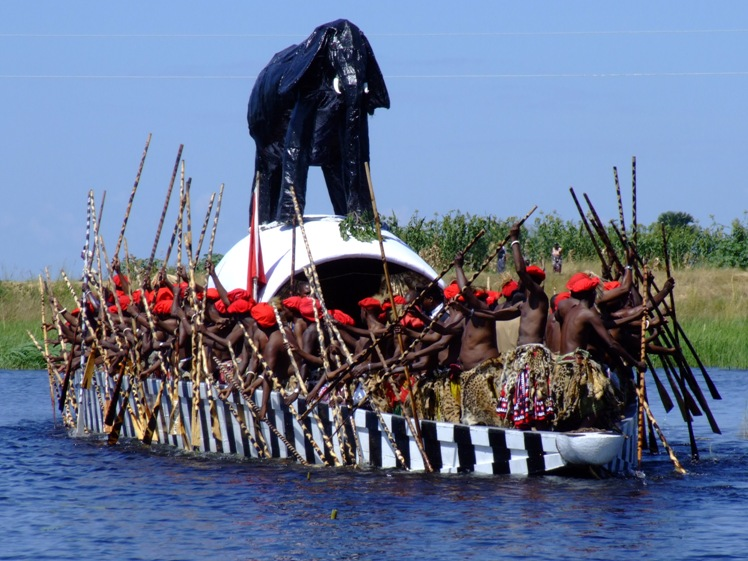
The King's barge

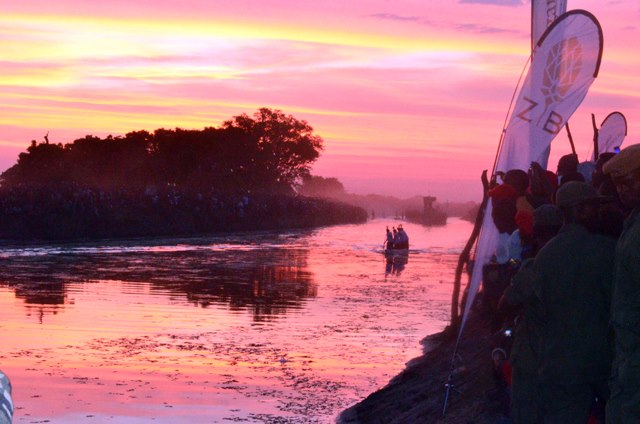
Paddlers preceding the arrival of the Litunga

Kuomboka is a word in the Lozi language; it literally means 'to get out of water'. In today's Zambia it is applied to a traditional ceremony that takes place at the end of the rain season, when the upper Zambezi River floods the plains of the Western Province. The festival celebrates the move of the Litunga, king of the Lozi people, from his compound at Lealui in the Barotse Floodplain of the Zambezi River to Limulunga on higher ground. The return trip is usually held in August with a less publicized journey called the Kufuluhela.

== History ==
Kuomboka is said to have dated back to the 17th century, when there was a great flood called meyi a lungwangwa. People were afraid to escape the flood in their little dugout canoes. So it was that the high god, Nyambe, ordered a man called Nakambela to build the first great canoe, Nalikwanda, which means "for the people," to escape the flood. Thus the start of what is known today as the Kuomboka ceremony. Held annually, the date of the ceremony was based on the height of the water and the moon's phase. The Litunga consulted the Royal Graves beforehand, after which the royal Maoma drums were sounded to call the paddlers.

The first barge was made of reeds and called Njonjolo, though it soon came to be made by wood (reportedly by the first Litunga Mboo). Barges received praise names from Litunga: Mboo's was called Sitandamwalye, Inyambo's Lyamashandi, and Ngalama's Notila. Yeta II used Notila during Kuombokas, but also built a barge called Nalikwanda. Mulambwa's was reportedly called Njonjolo, though he is said to have maintained Nalikwanda. Tradition attributes the addition of the elephant to Mulambwa, who is said to have ridden one to become heir to the Litunga, after which it became a royal symbol.

== The Procession ==
The ceremony is preceded by heavy drumming of the royal Maoma drums, which echoes around the royal capital the day before Kuomboka, announcing the event.

The Litunga begins the day in traditional dress, but during the journey changes into the full uniform of a British admiral that was presented to the Litunga in 1902 by King Edward VII, in recognition of treaties signed between the Lozi people and Queen Victoria. The ceremony is attended by hundreds of people each year.

The ceremony begins with two white scout canoes that are sent to check the depth of the water and for the presence of any enemies. Once the scouts signal the "all clear", the journey to the highland begins. The Litunga's royal boat is followed by another boat for his wife and another for the Prime Minister. The journey to Limulunga normally takes about 6–8 hours. Drums beat throughout to coordinate and energise those paddling the barge. The most important are the three royal war drums – kanaona, munanga, and mundili – each more than one metre wide and said to be at least 170 years old.

The Litunga is accompanied on the journey by his Prime Minister and other local area chiefs known as the Indunas.

The King's state barge is called Nalikwanda and is painted black and white, like Zambia's coat of arms. On the barge is a replica of a huge black elephant, the ears of which can be moved from inside the barge. There is also a fire on board, the smoke from which tells the people that the king is alive and well. The Nalikwanda is large enough to carry his possessions, his attendants, his musicians, his 100 paddlers. It is considered a great honour to be one of the hundred or so paddlers on the nalikwanda and each paddler wears a headdress of a scarlet beret with a piece of a lion's mane and a knee-length skirt of animal skins.

For his wife there is a second barge. This one has a huge cattle egret (Nalwange) on top. The wings move like the ears of the elephant, up and down.
