= Mwanawina II =

- Litunga
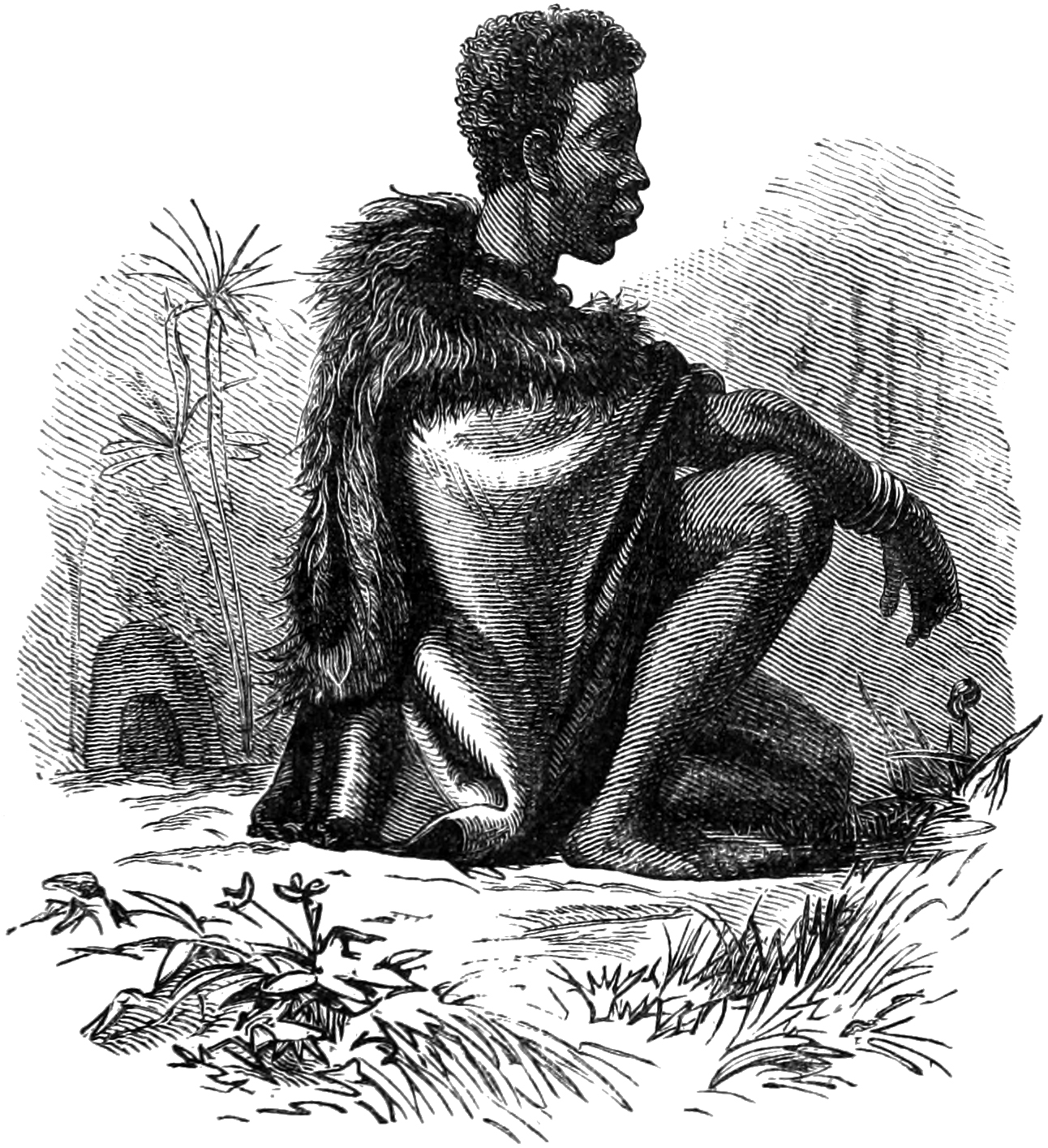
- Mwanawina II in the book Seven Years in South Africa (1881)

Litunga of Barotseland
- Predecessor: Sipopa; Mowa Mamili (regent)
- Successor: Lewanika
- Born: 19th century Barotseland
- Died: 1879; Island near Ng’ambwe
- Consort: Unknown
- Issue: Mwangala
- Father: Sibeso
- Mother: One princess

Mwanawina II was a king or chief of the Lozi people in what is now Zambia, a member of the third dynasty of Litungas. His full title was Mulena Yomuhulu Mbumu wa Litunga.

== Biography ==
=== Family ===
Mwanawina was a son of Prince Sibeso, who was a son of the King Mulambwa Santulu. Sibeso was killed in 1863.

Siblings of Mwanawina were Chief Musiwa and one more chief (name unknown).

He became a king after his uncles Silumelume and Mubukwanu.

=== Reign ===
Mwanawina was proclaimed king at Katongo. His daughter was named Mwangala, but her mother is not known.

Mwanawina appointed Mwangala when she was one year old to the throne in the south.

He was deposed and expelled by his nobles and killed (poisoned or starved to death) on an island near Ng'ambwe in 1879.

== Sources ==
- Makololo interregnum and the legacy of David Livingstone (PDF)
