= Makono =

Settlement in Zambia

- Town
- Location in Zambia
- Coordinates: 15°08′S 22°57′E
- Country: Zambia
- Province: Western Province
- District: Kalabo District
- Time zone: UTC+2 (CAT)

Makono is a settlement in Western Province, Zambia. It is home to the grave of Mbuyu, a female ancestress from whom all Litunga of Barotseland are held to have descended. Special rites are performed at Makono during a new Litunga's installation ritual.
