= Imwambo =

Settlement in Zambia

- Town
- Country: Zambia
- Province: Western Province
- District: Kalabo District
- Time zone: UTC+2 (CAT)

Imwambo is a settlement in Western Province, Zambia. It is home to the grave of Mboo Mwanasilundu Muyunda, who was the first Litunga of the Lozi Kingdom. Lozi tradition holds that he was originally buried at Ikatulamwa, but that his spirit chose to move to Imwambo, thus beginning the tradition of the Royal Graves wherein Litunga chose where they were to be buried. Special rites are performed at Imwambo during a new Litunga's installation ritual.
