= Amusaa Mwanamwambwa =

Zambian politician (1940–2023)

Speaker of the National Assembly
- In office 1998–2011
- Preceded by: Robinson Nabulyato
- Succeeded by: Patrick Matibini

Minister of Agriculture, Food and Fisheries
- In office 1998–1998
- Preceded by: Edith Nawakwi
- Succeeded by: Sureshi Desai

Minister of Tourism
- In office 1996–1998
- Preceded by: Gabriel Maka
- Succeeded by: Katele Kalumba

Minister of Information and Broadcasting Services
- In office 1996–1996
- Succeeded by: David Mpamba

Minister of Legal Affairs
- In office 1995–1996

Minister of Sport, Youth and Child Development
- In office 1994–1995

Deputy Minister of Tourism
- In office 1993–1994

Member of the National Assembly for Liuwa
- In office 1991–1998

Personal details
- Born: 15 May 1940 Imwambo, Northern Rhodesia
- Died: 21 October 2023 (aged 83) Lusaka, Zambia
- Party: Movement for Multi-Party Democracy
- Profession: Civil servant, diplomat, businessman

Amusaa Katunda Mwanamwambwa (15 May 1940 – 21 October 2023) was a Zambian politician. He was a member of the National Assembly for Liuwa between 1991 and 1998, also holding several ministerial posts. In 1998 he became Speaker of the National Assembly, a post he held until 2011.

== Biography ==
Mwanamwambwa was born in 1940 into a family from Imwambo in the Kalabo District. He attended Mukola Primary School between 1949 and 1953, after which he was educated at Libonda Middle School, Lukona Upper Primary School and Mongu Secondary School, before going to Munali Secondary School between 1960 and 1964. Whilst at Secondary School he joined the Youth Brigade of the United National Independence Party.

After spending a year working as an Information Assistant at the Zambia Information Services, he enrolled at Middlebury College in the United States in 1965, earning a BA in political science in 1969. In 1970 he was appointed Information Attache in the Office of the Zambian Permanent Representative to the Headquarters of the United Nations, going onto become Newspaper Manager for the Zambian Information Services in 1972. He later served as Chief Tourist Officer and managing director of the Zambia National Tourist Bureau and earned a Diploma in Tourism Planning from the University of Bradford in the United Kingdom.

Mwanamwambwa joined a family business in 1987, becoming its executive director. He became a member of the Movement for Multi-Party Democracy (MMD) in 1991 and was the MMD candidate in Liuwa in the 1991 general elections, which saw him elected to the National Assembly. He was appointed Deputy Minister of Tourism in 1993, before becoming Minister of Sport, Youth and Child Development the following year. In 1995 he was made Minister of Legal Affairs, and in 1996 he was appointed Minister of Information and Broadcasting Services as well as becoming the Government Spokesperson.

After being re-elected to the National Assembly in the 1996 general elections, Mwanamwambwa was appointed Minister of Tourism. He was later moved to become Minister of Agriculture, Food and Fisheries in 1998. In November 1998 he resigned from his cabinet post and gave up his seat in the National Assembly so that he could be elected Speaker. He held the post until retiring in June 2011.

Mwanamwambwa died on 21 October 2023 at the age of 83.
