= Nandopu =

Settlement in Zambia

- Town
- Location in Zambia
- Coordinates: 14°17′S 23°05′E
- Country: Zambia
- Province: Western Province
- District: Lukulu District
- Time zone: UTC+2 (CAT)

Nandopu is a settlement in Western Province, Zambia. It is home to the grave of Yeta II, the 5th Litunga of the Lozi Kingdom.
