= Lilundu =

Settlement in Zambia

- Town
- Location in Zambia
- Coordinates: 15°17′S 23°03′E
- Country: Zambia
- Province: Western Province
- District: Mongu District
- Time zone: UTC+2 (CAT)

Lilundu is a settlement in Western Province, Zambia. It is home to the grave of Mulambwa, the 10th Litunga of the Lozi Kingdom.
