= Notulu =

Notulu is a name shared by several noblewomen of Barotseland in Africa.

== Queen Notulu ==
Notulu I was queen consort as a wife of King Ngombala of the Lozi people. She was starved to death by one of his successors, King Mwananyanda Liwale. Her father was named Mwiyawamatende.

== Chieftainess Notulu ==
Notulu II of Libumbwandinde was a chieftainess. She was the daughter of King Ngombala and the queen mentioned above, her namesake. She was also a sister of the Prince Mbanga, mother of the Chief Mukwangwa and aunt of the king Mwanawina I.

== Princess Notulu ==
Notulu III was a princess consort as a wife of Mbanga (mentioned above). Thus both the sister and the wife of Prince Mbanga had the same name and they were sisters-in-law.

Her children were:

- King Yubya
- Chief Nakambe, 3rd Chief of Nalolo
- Mwanamalia, 4th Chief of Nalolo
- Yubya II, 2nd Chief of Nalolo
- Prince Nakambe
- King Mwanawina I
