= Yubya =

High Chief of Barotseland

Yubya I
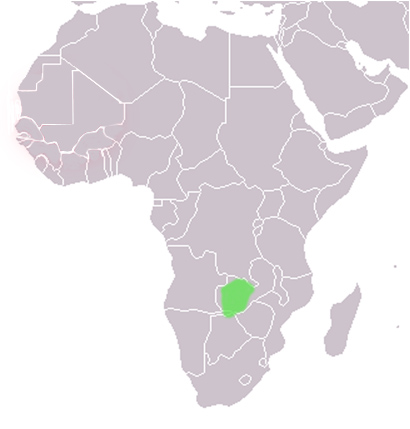
- Map of the Lozi Kingdom
- Spouse: Namoyowa ta lole
- Children: Kusiyo
- Relatives: Parents: Prince Mbanga and Notulu III

Mulena Yomuhulu Mbumu wa Litunga Yubya (or Yubiya) was a King of Barotseland in Zambia, Africa, one of the sacred Lozi chiefs.

== Biography ==
=== Family and marriage ===
He was a son of Prince Mbanga and Princess Notulu III and grandson of the Chief Ngombala.

Yubya was a regent for his grandfather, during his old age. He succeeded on his death.

His wife was Namoyowa ta lole and his son was prince Kusiyo, 5th Chief of Nalolo, who opposed the succession of his cousin Mulambwa Santulu.

=== Death ===
He died at Namayula and was buried there.
