= Mulumbo =

Settlement in Zambia

- Town
- Location in Zambia
- Coordinates: 15°18′S 23°06′E
- Country: Zambia
- Province: Western Province
- District: Mongu District
- Time zone: UTC+2 (CAT)

Mulumbo is a settlement in Western Province, Zambia. It is home to the grave of Yeta III, the Litunga of Barotseland from 1916–1945.
