= Ngalama =

King of the Lozi people

- Title: King of Barotseland
- Spouse: Cousin
- Children: Yeta II Nalute; Ngombala
- Parent: Chief Ingulamwa

Mulena Yomuhulu Mbumu wa Litunga Ngalama was a king of the Lozi people in Barotseland Zambia, Africa. He was the first member of a continuous dynasty of Lozi kings, and is credited with capturing the Maoma drums that became a key part of Lozi ceremonies.

== Biography ==
Ngalama was a son of Prince Ingulamwa, Chief of Mokola, who was a son of Queen Mbuymamwambwa.

He was adopted by his paternal uncle, Chief Inyambo, and he succeeded on the death of his other uncle, king Yeta I.

Ngalama had married a daughter of his uncle, Prince Mwanambinyi.

He was buried at Kwandu, having had sons who were kings: Yeta II Nalute and Ngombala.

His grandson was Prince Mbanga.
