= Namayula =

Settlement in Zambia

- Town
- Location in Zambia
- Coordinates: 15°08′S 22°57′E
- Country: Zambia
- Province: Western Province
- District: Kalabo District
- Time zone: UTC+2 (CAT)

Namayula is a settlement in Western Province, Zambia. It is home to the grave of Yubya, the seventh Litunga.
