= Nanikelako =

Settlement in Zambia

- Town
- Location in Zambia
- Coordinates: 15°11′S 22°57′E
- Country: Zambia
- Province: Western Province
- District: Mongu District
- Time zone: UTC+2 (CAT)

Nanikelako is a settlement in Western Province, Zambia. It is home to the grave of Lewanika, the Litunga of the Lozi Kingdom from 1878–1884 and 1885–1916.
