= List of populated places in Zambia =

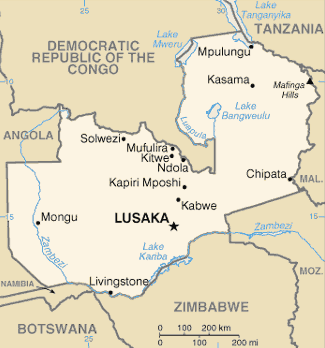
Map of Zambia

This is a list of cities, towns, villages and missions in Zambia.

== Cities ==
City	Province		Population				Image
City	Province	2022 census	2010 census	2000 census	1990 census	1980 census	Image
Lusaka	Lusaka	3,079,964	1,747,152	1,084,703	769,353	735,830	
Kitwe	Copperbelt	661,901	501,360	363,734		283,962	
Ndola	Copperbelt	624,579	451,246	374,757	329,228	297,490	
Livingstone	Southern	177,393	134,349	97,488	76,875	61,296	
Chipata	Eastern	206,552	116,627	73,110	52,213	33,627	

== Other towns, villages and missions ==
- Chadiza
- Chama
- Chambishi
- Chavuma
- Chembe
- Chibombo
- Chiengi
- Chilanga, Lusaka
- Chilanga, Muchinga
- Chilonga
- Chilubi
- Chililabombwe
- Chingola
- Chinsali
- Chinyingi
- Chirundu
- Chisamba
- Choma
- Chozi
- Gwembe
- Imwambo
- Isoka
- Kabompo
- Kabwe
- Kafue
- Kafulwe
- Kalabo
- Kalene Hill
- Kalomo
- Kalulushi
- Kanyembo
- Kaoma
- Kapiri Mposhi
- Kasama
- Kasempa
- Kashikishi
- Kataba
- Katete
- Kawambwa
- Kazembe (Mwansabombwe)
- Kazungula
- Lilundu
- Luangwa
- Luanshya
- Lufwanyama
- Lukulu
- Lundazi
- Maamba
- Macha Mission
- Makono
- Mansa
- Mazabuka
- Mbala
- Mbereshi
- Mfuwe
- Milenge
- Mkushi
- Mongu
- Monze
- Mpika
- Mporokoso
- Mpulungu
- Mufulira
- Mulumbo
- Mumbwa
- Muyombe
- Mwandi
- Mwinilunga
- Nakonde
- Namayula
- Nandopu
- Nanikelako
- Nchelenge
- Ngoma
- Nseluka
- Pemba
- Petauke
- Samfya
- Senanga
- Serenje
- Sesheke
- Shangombo
- Shiwa Ngandu
- Siavonga
- Sikalongo
- Sinazeze
- Sinazongwe
- Sioma
- Solwezi
- Zambezi
- Zimba

== Gallery ==
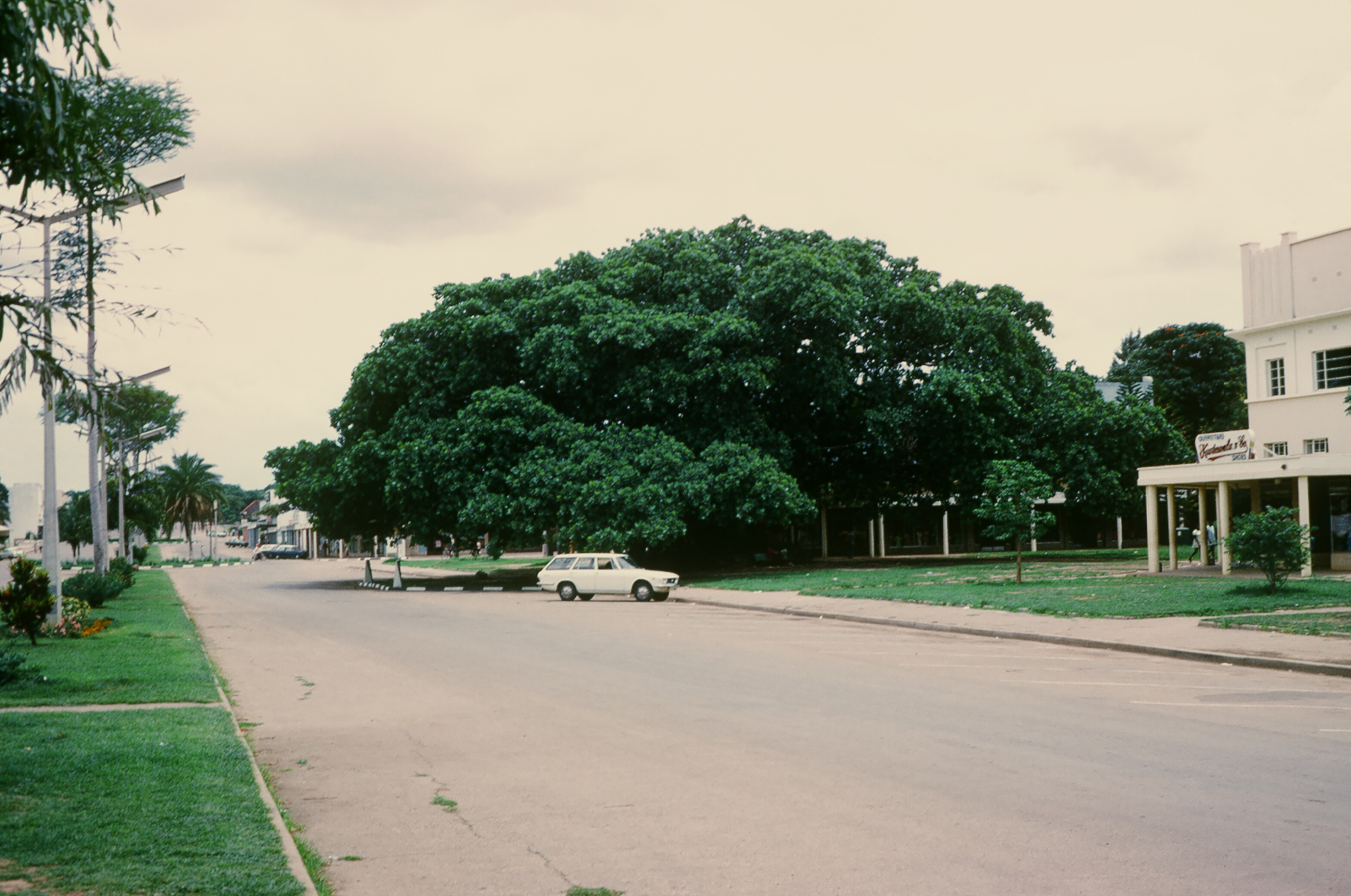
Big Tree National Monument, Kabwe

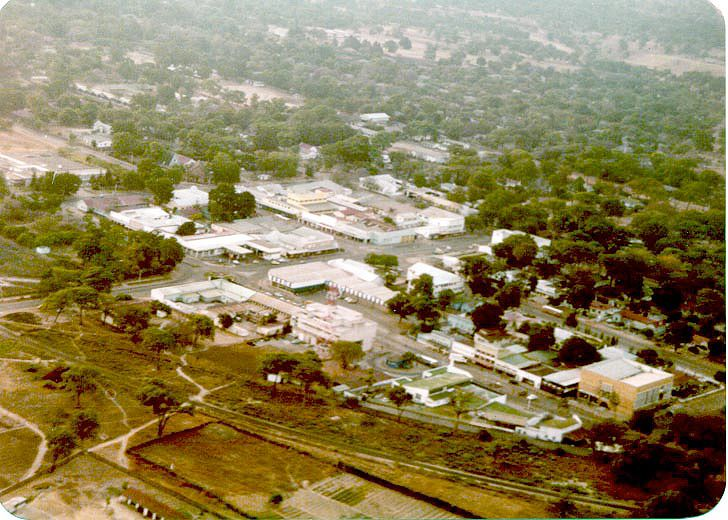
Luanshya

== See also ==
- Districts of Zambia
- Provinces of Zambia
- List of cities by country
- List of Zambia-related topics
- List of cities in East Africa
