= Mwanawina I =

- Barotseland Flag
- Title: King of Barotseland
- Predecessor: Yubya I
- Successor: Mwananyanda Liwale
- Spouses: Lienenu; Nolianga; Mbuywana
- Children: Mwananyanda Liwale; Mulambwa Santulu; Yutuluwakaole; Inyambo
- Parent(s): Prince Mbanga of Nalolo; Princess Notulu III

Mwanawina I was a Litunga (king or chief) of Barotseland in Africa.

== Biography ==
Mwanawina was the youngest son of Prince Mbanga, 1st Chief of Nalolo, and brother to the king Yubya. His mother was princess Notulu.

He succeeded on the death of his brother.

His wives were:

- Lienenu
- Nolianga
- Princess Mbuywana

He died at the village of the Induna Namoyamba.

His sons were kings Mwananyanda Liwale and Mulambwa Santulu and princes Yutuluwakaole (crown prince) and Inyambo.

His grandsons were prince Mwanang'ono and kings Mubukwanu and Silumelume.
