= Silumelume =

- Chief of Barotseland
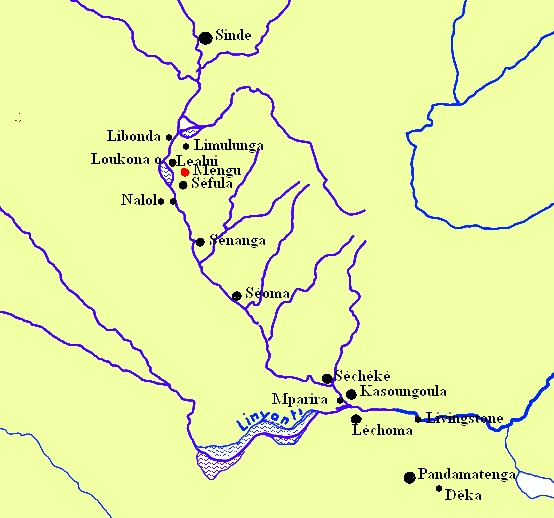
- Map of Barotseland in Zambia, kingdom of Silumelume
- Succeeded by: Mubukwanu (brother)

Personal details
- Relations: Mulambwa Santulu (father); Monambeza (sister)
- Children: Maselokwa and Kutauka

Mulena Yomuhulu Mbumu wa Litunga Selumelume Muimui (or Silumelume) was a Chief of Barotseland in Africa.

== Family and life ==
Silumelume was a son of the King Mulambwa Santulu and thus grandson of King Mwanawina I.

Lozi people believed that he was a descendant of god Nyambe.

He became a king in 1835 after his father died, but his brother Mubukwanu was not pleased with that.

=== Death ===
Silumelume was in fact chosen by the nation's council, but he was soon assassinated, perhaps on the instructions of his brother, who thereupon succeeded him.

He was killed by Mwene Siengale during a session of the Khotla and was buried at Namaweshi.

=== Children ===
His wife is unknown, but his children were Maselokwa and Kutauka (gender unknown).

== Sources ==
- Makololo interregnum and the legacy of David Livingstone (PDF)
