= Liondo =

Plain in Zambia

- Plain
- Location within Zambia
- Coordinates: 16°04′S 23°50′E
- Location: Western Province, Zambia
- Elevation: 1,063 m (3,488 ft)

Liondo is a plain in Western Province, Zambia. Its elevation is around 1,063 m (3,488 ft). It was the site of a battle between the Makololo and the Lozi Kingdom c. 1840.
