= Liuwa (constituency) =

Constituency of the National Assembly of Zambia

Liuwa is a constituency of the National Assembly of Zambia. It covers the northern part of Kalabo District in Western Province.

== List of MPs ==
Election year	MP	Party
Libonda
1968	Nalumino Mundia	Zambian African National Congress
Liuwa
1973	Simon Ngombo	United National Independence Party
1978	Namushi Namuchana	United National Independence Party
1983	Isaac Chulu	United National Independence Party
1988	Judah Haciwa	United National Independence Party
1991	Amusaa Mwanamwambwa	Movement for Multi-Party Democracy
1996	Amusaa Mwanamwambwa	Movement for Multi-Party Democracy
1998 (by-election)	Nabiwa Imikendu	Movement for Multi-Party Democracy
2001	Bataba Wamulume	United Party for National Development
2006	Hastings Imasiku	United Party for National Development
2011	Situmbeko Musokotwane	Movement for Multi-Party Democracy
2016	Situmbeko Musokotwane	United Party for National Development
2021	Situmbeko Musokotwane	United Party for National Development
2026	Situmbeko Musokotwane	United Party for National Development

In the 2006 election, Maliwa Kashweka (MMD) was elected, but died before he was due to take office. Hastings Imasiku was elected in a by-election.
