= Mubukwanu =

- Litunga
- Died: c. 1840
- Spouse: One chiefess
- Issue: Alikunda; Sipopa Lutangu; Mwangala Mubukwanu; Musiwa Mubukwanu; Mwanawina Mubukwanu; Imasiku Mubukwanu
- Father: Mulambwa Santulu
- Mother: Unknown

Mulena Yomuhulu Mbumu wa Litunga Mubukwanu (died c. 1840) was a High Chief of the Lozi people, King of Barotseland in Africa. He quarrelled with his brother Silumelume.

== Biography ==
=== Family ===
Mubukwanu was a son of the Chief Mulambwa Santulu and grandson of Chief Mwanawina I.

His younger brother was Chief Silumelume, successor of their father.

According to Mutumba Mainga, Mubukwanu was the father of Sipopa Lutangu.

=== Reign ===
Mubukwanu wanted to be a king and he began to rule after Silumelume was killed. It is possible that Mubukwanu ordered murder of his brother.

Mubukwanu was also the 6th Chief of Nalolo, but was defeated and exiled by the Makololo, after their conquest of Barotseland. He then fled into hiding on Lipu Island.

He was poisoned by his wife at Lukulu Fort, ca. 1840.

=== Children ===
Mubukwanu had six sons:

- Prince Alikunda
- King Sipopa Lutangu
- Prince Imasiku Mubukwanu
- Prince Mwanawina Mubukwanu
- Prince Mwangala Mubukwanu
- Prince Musiwa Mubukwanu

Imasiku was proclaimed king at Lukulu Fort after death of his father, but was defeated by the Makololo and fled with his followers across the Kabompo River, settling in the Lukwakwa country.
