= Mwananyanda =

Mwananyanda Liwale
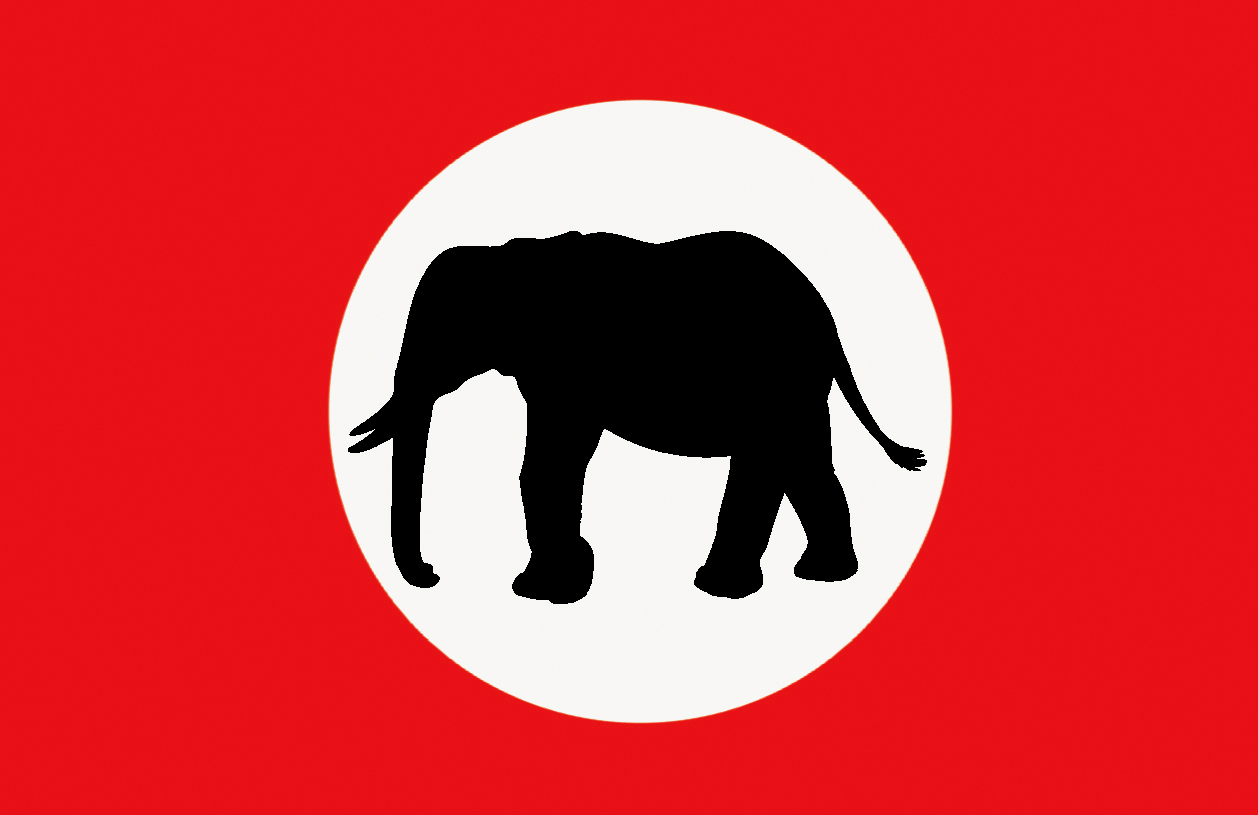
- Royal flag of Barotseland
- Title: King of Barotseland
- Successor: Mulambwa Santulu
- Children: Mwanang'ono (son)
- Parent: Mwanawina I

Mulena Yomuhulu Mbumu wa Litunga Mwananyanda Liwale was a King of Barotseland in Zambia.

== Biography ==
=== Family ===
Mwananyanda was the second son of the King Mwanawina I and grandson of Prince Mbanga and Princess Notulu.

His brothers were Prince Yutuluwakaole and King Mulambwa Santulu, who succeeded him.

He had a son, Prince Mwanang'ono, who was a candidate for the succession.

=== Reign ===
Mwananyanda Liwale succeeded his father.

Queen Notulu was killed on his order, being starved to death.

He was killed by Mwanamatia, 4th Chief of Nalolo.
