= Gabriel Maka =

Zambian politician

Ambassador to Egypt
- In office 2003–2004

Minister of Tourism
- In office 1995–1996
- President: Frederick Chiluba
- Preceded by: Christon Tembo
- Succeeded by: Amusaa Mwanamwambwa

Minister of Science, Technology and Vocational Training
- In office 1993–1995

Minister of Community Development and Social Services
- In office 1991–1993
- Succeeded by: Nakatindi Wina

Member of the National Assembly for Kapiri Mposhi
- In office 1991–1996
- Succeeded by: Macdonald Nkabika

Personal details
- Died: 2011
- Party: Movement for Multi-Party Democracy

Gabriel Kanyenda Maka (died 2011) was a Zambian politician and diplomat. He served as Member of the National Assembly for Kapiri Mposhi from 1991 until 1996 and was the Zambian Ambassador to Egypt between 2003 and 2004.

== Biography ==
Maka contested the Kapiri Mposhi seat as the Movement for Multi-Party Democracy candidate in the 1991 general elections and was elected with a 4,300 majority over his United National Independence Party opponent. He was subsequently appointed Minister of Community Development and Social Services and later Minister of Science, Technology and Vocational Training and Minister of Tourism. He ran for re-election in the 1996 general elections, but was defeated by independent candidate Macdonald Nkabika by a margin of 294 votes.

In 1998 Maka was appointed High Commissioner to Nigeria. He subsequently served as Ambassador to Egypt between 2003 and 2004. He died in 2011.
