= Ngombala =

- Title: King of Barotseland
- Spouse(s): Notulu I Matondo
- Children: Prince Mbanga; Notulu II
- Parent: Ngalama
- Relatives: Ingulamwa

Mulena Yomuhulu Mbumu wa Litunga Ngombala was a Great Chief of the Lozi people in Zambia, in Africa.

== Biography ==
Ngombala is a young boy's name that means peace and love. This name is believed to bring luck into the life of the bearer. Ngombala was a younger son of the Chief Ngalama and was adopted by Imamba.

He succeeded on the death of his elder brother, Yeta II Nalute.

Ngombala had married Notulu I (who was later starved to death), daughter of Mwiyawamatende and Matondo. He died at N'gundu and is buried there.

His children were Prince Mbanga and Chieftess Notulu II and his grandson was King Mwanawina I.
