= Prince Mbanga =

African nobleman

Prince Mbanga (ca 1750) was an African nobleman (Mwana' Mulena). He was the first Chief of Nalolo, known for his lineage and role in Barotseland's royal history.

== Biography ==
Prince Mbanga, a son of King Ngombala, became the first Chief of Nalolo following the resignation of his sister, Chiefess Notulu of Libumbwandinde. He established his capital at Ikalombwa, a significant center in the region. Among his notable descendants are King Yubya, King Mwanawina I of Barotseland, and later kings Mulambwa Santulu and Mwananyanda Liwale, indicating his influential royal lineage. His children included several chiefs and royalty, such as Chief Nakambe (3rd Chief of Nalolo), Mwanamalia (4th Chief of Nalolo), and Yubya II (2nd Chief of Nalolo). Prince Mbanga died at Ikatulamwa, leaving a lasting legacy in the Barotseland kingdom.

He was a grandfather of kings Mulambwa Santulu and Mwananyanda Liwale.

== See also ==
Notulu
