= Macdonald Nkabika =

Zambian politician

Member of the National Assembly for Kapiri Mposhi
- In office 1996–2001
- Preceded by: Gabriel Maka
- Succeeded by: John Mwaimba

Personal details
- Party: Independent
- Profession: Businessman

Macdonald Nkabika is a Zambian businessman and former politician. He served as Member of the National Assembly for Kapiri Mposhi from 1996 until 2001.

== Biography ==
Prior to entering politics, Nkabika worked for the Zambia National Provident Fund and ran the NODA Investment company. Nkabika contested the Kapiri Mposhi seat as an independent candidate in the 1996 general elections. He defeated incumbent MP Gabriel Maka of the Movement for Multi-Party Democracy by 294 votes and was elected to the National Assembly.

Nkabika opted not to run in Kapiri Mposhi for the 2001 general elections, instead standing as an independent candidate in Kafue, where he finished eighth in a field of nine candidates with only 338 votes.
