= Inyambo =

Legendary Lozi king

Mulena Yomuhulu Mbumu wa Litunga Inyambo was a Great African King of the Lozi people in Barotseland, Zambia, one of the first kings of the Lozi, and likely a mythical ruler or demigod.

== Biography ==
He is called "the son Nyambe of Mbuymamwambwa". Nyambe (or Nyame) is a Sky deity and Mbuymamwambwa is his Queen consort.

He was a successor of his brother Mwanasolundwi Muyunda Mumbo wa Mulonga.

His consorts were queens named Namwele and Maondo. Namwele borne him a son named Numwa.

He died at Liondo and his successor was Yeta I.
