= Nyengo language =

Bantu language spoken in Zambia as part of the Luyi language of western Zambia

Nyengo
- Native to: Zambia
- Native speakers: 40,000 (2023)
- Language family: Niger–Congo?: Atlantic–Congo; Volta-Congo; Benue–Congo; Bantoid; Bantu (Zone K); Chokwe–Luchazi (K.10); Nyengo

Language codes
- ISO 639-3: nye
- Glottolog: nyen1257
- Guthrie code: K.16

Nyengo (Nhengo) is a minor Bantu language of Angola.
