= Kafulwe =

Coordinates: 8°59′S 29°1′E

Kafulwe is a fishing village on Lake Mweru in the Luapula Province of Zambia, situated just north of the mouth of the Kalungwishi River, and 3 km west of the Nchelenge-Chiengi road. The population of the area is increased considerably by temporary fishing camps on the white sandy beaches when kapenta, a small sardine-like fish is in season. Some of the fish is transported across the lake for sale in the DR Congo and some is trucked south to the Copperbelt.

Kafulwe Mission was a small mission with one missionary established in 1922 by the London Missionary Society as an offshoot of the much larger Mbereshi Mission 100 km to the south. Concerned mainly with evangelical work and mission schools, it closed in the 1960s and was succeeded by a church of the United Church of Zambia.

== See also ==
- Kalungwishi River
- Lake Mweru – Lake in Zambia and Congo DR
- Nchelenge
