= Kataba =

Coordinates: 11°52′S 29°46′E

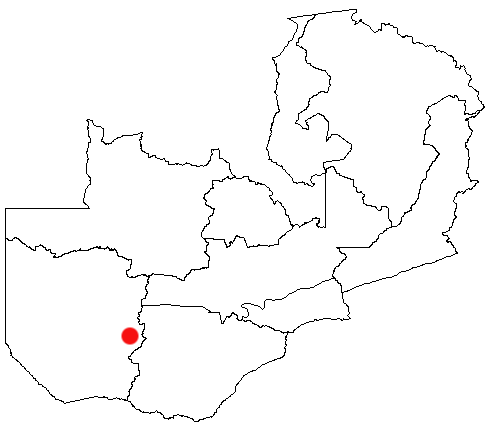
Location of Kataba in Zambia

Kataba is a town located in the Western Province of Zambia. Its original name was Kataba Masamba. It is in the Mulobezi District.
