= Yeta II =

Yeta II Nalute
- Title: King of Barotseland
- Parent: Ngalama
- Relatives: Ngombala (brother)

Mulena Yomuhulu Mbumu wa Litunga Yeta II Nalute was an African High Chief, king of the Lozi people and Barotseland in Zambia.

== Biography ==
Yeta was a son of the Great King Ngalama and grandson of Prince Ingulamwa and was named after the king Yeta I.

His brother was king Ngombala.

It is said that his divine ancestor was god Nyambe, king of the Sky.

He exiled at the Mashi, together with his mother, during his father's lifetime, and was captured and sold into slavery, but returned to Barotseland, after his father's death. He was drowned by his people for cannibalism.
