= Mutumba Mainga =

Zambian historian and politician (1938–2026)

Mutumba Mainga or Mutumba Mainga Bull (1938 – 13 February 2026) was a Zambian historian and politician. She was the first Zambian woman to gain a PhD, the first Zambian woman to lecture at the University of Zambia, and the first Zambian woman to serve as a full Cabinet Minister in Zambia.

== Life and career ==
Mutumba Mainga came from Nalikolo, a village in Mongu District. She was the daughter of Induna, Paramount chief of the Lozi people. She was educated at Sefula Mission School, Senanga Mission School, Mabumbu Mission School, Chipembi Mission School and Goromonzi Government School, before gaining her first degree from the University College of Rhodesia and Nyasaland, and a BA in history from the University of London in 1963. In 1965 she married Nicholas Theodore Bull, a grandson of Otto Beit. In 1969 she gained her history PhD from the University of London. She also spent a year of postgraduate research at the University of Cambridge. From 1969 to 1973 she lectured in history at the University of Zambia.

In 1973 Mutumba Mainga Bull was elected to parliament, as MP for Nalolo Constituency in Western Province. From 1973 to 1976 she was Minister of Health. She held various positions in UNIP before retiring from active politics in 1991.

In 1996 Mutumba Mainga Bull returned to the University of Zambia as a Senior Research Fellow. From 2005 to 2008 she was the Director of the Institute of Economic and Social Research at the University.

Mainga died on 13 February 2026, at the age of 88.

== Works ==
- 'A History of Lozi Religion to the end of the Nineteenth Century', in Terence O. Ranger and Isaria N. Kimambo, eds., The Historical Study of African Religion. Berkeley: University of California Press, 1972
- 'Lewanika's Achievement', The Journal of African History, Vol. 13, No. 3 (1972)
- Bulozi under the Luyana Kings: Political Evolution and State Formation in Pre-colonial Zambia. London: Longmans, 1973.
- The Barotseland Agreement 1964 in Historical Perspective: A Preliminary Study. 1985.
- The Political Process in Zambia, 2001, 2002.
- 'Reserved Area: Barotseland of the 1964 Agreement', Zambia Social Science Journal, Vol. 5, No. 1 (2014)
