= Yeta I =

Mulena Yomuhulu Mbumu wa Litunga Yeta I was a High Chief of the Lozi people in Barotseland, Africa.

== Family ==
It is said that he was a son of the first Lozi king Nyame, by his second wife, queen Mwambwa. Nyame is a Sky god in African mythology.

It is believed that Mwambwa was a historical person, the Lunda woman.

He succeeded on the death of his brother Inyambo and married Namabanda.

He died at Namanda and was buried there.
