= Mboo Mwanasilundu Muyunda =

Mythical ruler of the Lozi people in Zambia

Mboo Mwanasilundu Muyunda is regarded as the first Litunga (king) of the Lozi Kingdom in Zambia.

He was a king of Lozi and a demigod, one of the sacred high chiefs of Barotseland.

== Biography ==
His father was the god Nyambe. His mother was a mortal queen named Mbuyuwamwambwa, a daughter of Mwambwa.

He was chosen as the first male ruler of the Lozi. He extended his realm by conquering the ba-Mishulundu, ba-Namale, ba-Mulinga, ba-Upangoma, ba-Liuwa, ba-Muenyi and the Mambowe.

His wife was Chiefess Malundwelo.

He died at Ikatulamwa and is buried there.
