= Litunga =

King of the Lozi people

Litunga of Barotseland

Incumbent
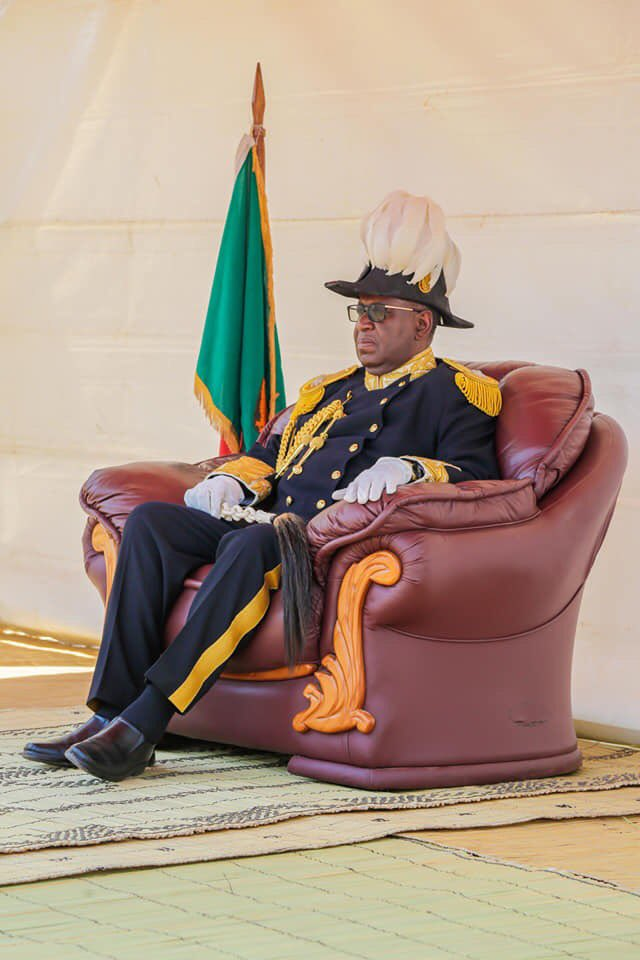
- Imwiko II since October 2000

Details
- Style: Mbumu wa Litunga

The Litunga of Barotseland (in Zambia) is the King of the Lozi people (also called "Barotse"). The Litunga resides near the Zambezi River and the town of Mongu, at Lealui on the floodplain in the dry season, and on higher ground at Limulunga on the edge of the floodplain in the wet season. The Litunga moves between these locations in what is known as the Kuomboka ceremony.

The current Litunga is Lubosi Imwiko II.

== List of Litunga ==
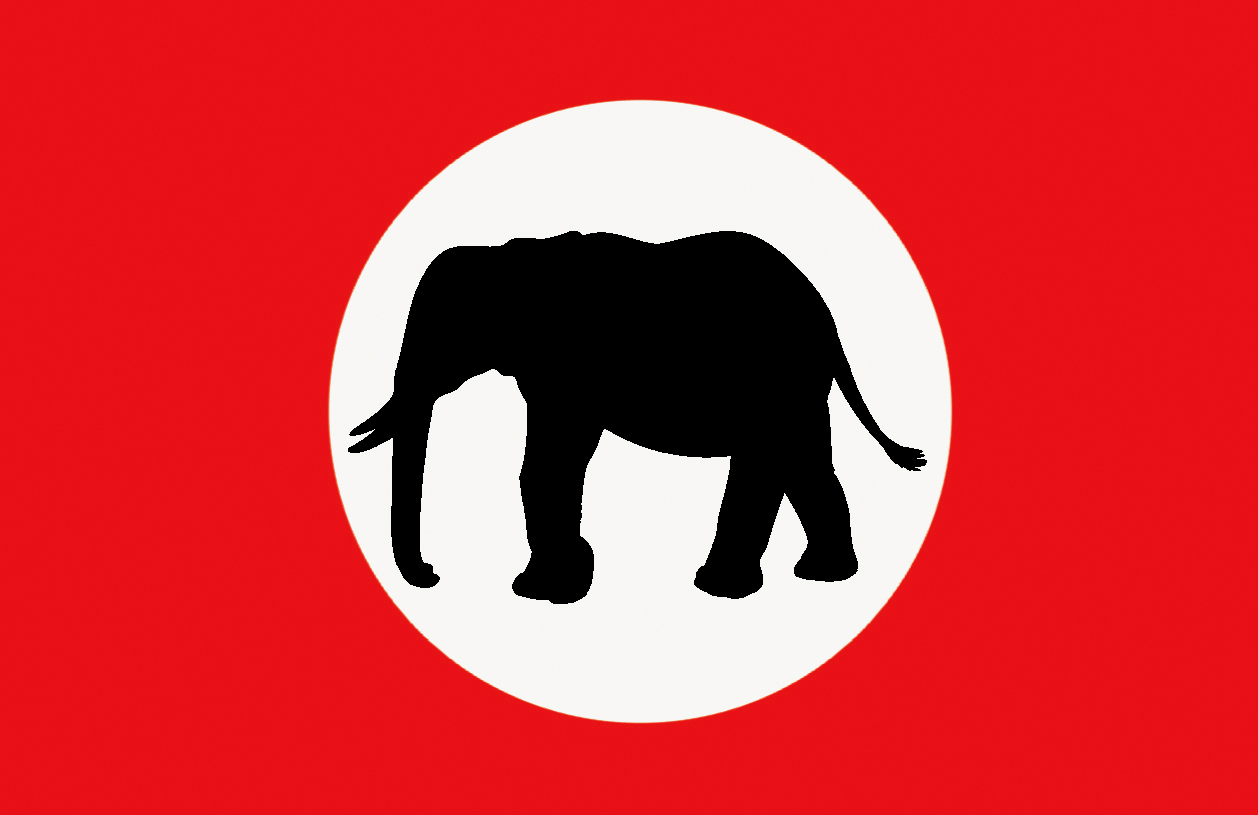
Royal standard of Barotseland

=== Rulers (title Mbumu wa Litunga) ===
- Nyambe (god)
- Mwanasolundwi Muyunda Mumbo wa Mulonga (demigod)
- Inyambo
- Yeta I
- Ngalama
- Yeta II Nalute
- Ngombala
- Yubya
- Mwanawina I
- Mwananyanda Liwale
- Mulambwa Santulu (1780 – 1830)
- Silumelume (1830) – Son of Mulambwa
- Mubukwanu (1830 - 1838) – Son of Mulambwa
- Imasiku (1838) – Son of Mubukwanu

=== Makololo chiefs (title Morêna) ===
- Sebetwane (1838 - 1851)
- Mamochisane (female) (1851) – Daughter of Sebetwane
- Sekeletu (1851 - 1863) – Son of Sebetwane and Setlutlu
- Mambili (1863)
- Liswaniso (in rebellion) (1863)
- Mbololo (1863 - 1864) – Brother of Sebetwane

=== Rulers (title Mbumu wa Litunga) ===
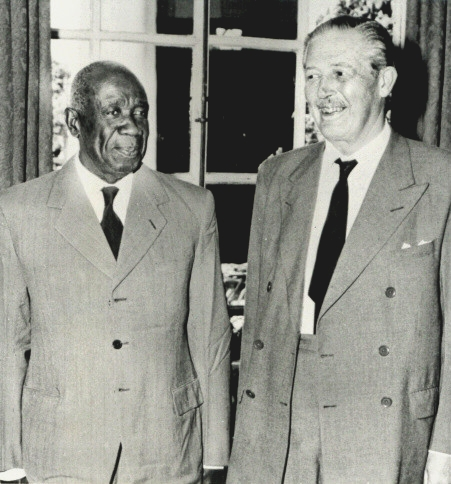
Mwanawina III with British Prime Minister Harold Macmillan

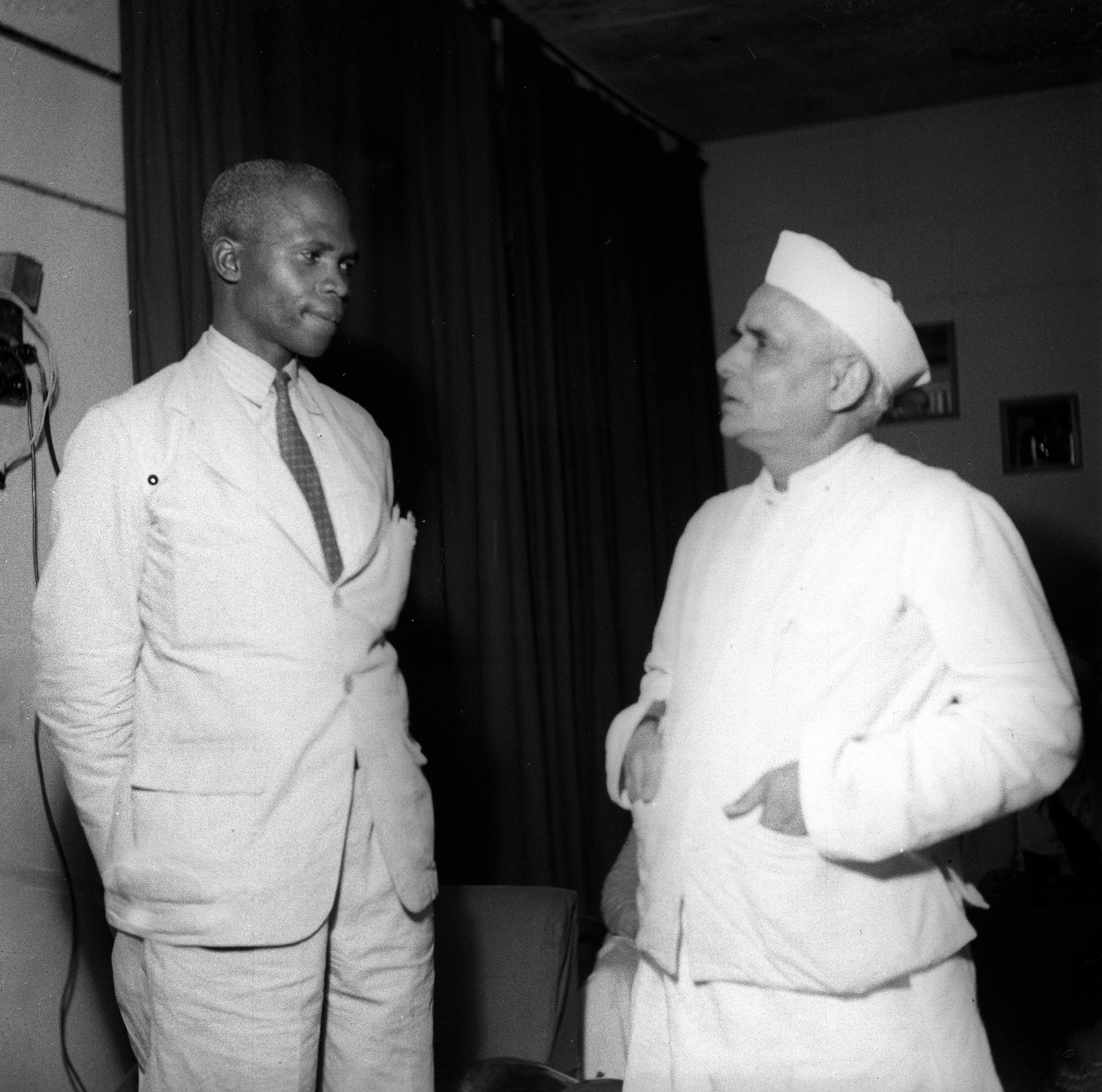
Godwin Mbikusita-Lewanika with Indian politician R. R. Diwakar

- Sipopa Lutangu (1864 - 1876)
- Mowa Mamili – Regent (1876)
- Mwanawina II (1876 - 1878)
- Lubosi I (1st time) (1878 - 1884)
- Akufuna Tatila (1884 - 1885)
- Sikufele (in rebellion) (1885)
- Lubosi I (Lewanika I) (2nd time) (1885 - 1916)
- Mokamba - Regent (1916)
- Litia Yeta III (1916 - 1945), eldest son of Lewanika I
- Shemakone Kalonga Wina -Regent (1st time) (1945 - 1946)
- Imwiko Lewanika (Imwiko I) (1946 - 1948), third son of Lewanika I
- Shemakone Kalonga Wina -Regent (2nd time) (1948)
- Mwanawina III (1948 - 1968), fifth son of Lewenika I
- Hastings Ndangwa Noyoo -Regent (1968)
- Godwin Mbikusita-Lewanika (Lewanika II) (1968 - 1977), ninth son of Lewanika I
- Ilute Yeta IV (1977 - 2000), son of Yeta III
- Lubosi Imwiko II (2000–Present), son of Imwiko Lewanika

=== Litunga la Mboela ===
The kingdom's south is ruled by a woman, the Litunga la Mboela or "Queen of the South", and is subordinate to the north ruled by the Litunga.
