= Mulambwa =

Mulambwa Santulu
- Title: King of Barotseland
- Predecessor: Mwananyanda Liwale
- Successor: Silumelume
- Children: Mubukwanu; Silumelume more sons and several daughters
- Parent(s): Mwanawina I Mbuywana

Mulambwa Santulu (born Maimbolwa Santulu) was the 10th litunga (king) of Barotseland who ruled from 1780 to 1830.. He is famous for introducing a series of reforms such as a new constitution into the Lozi Kingdom. He has been called "Mulambwa Mutomi Wa Mulao" which translates to "Mulambwa the creator of laws."

During this period, the practice of slave trading affiliated with both Arab and Portuguese markets was gradually expanding from the coastal regions into the African interior. The name 'Mulambwa' was acquired as a nickname based on his tough stance against slave trading. It is derived from the phrase "Muule ambwa, Muulese kuule Anu" which translates to "buy dogs, but not another human being." Barotseland was made a no-go area for slave traders.

His reign is also characterised by the arrival of the Mbunda tribe into Barotseland, who had fled Angola as refugees escaping slave trading. They were welcomed to resettle into his kingdom and would become strong allies.

== Biography ==
Mulambwa Santulu was the third son of the king Mwanawina I, by his wife, Queen Mbuywana.

He was a chief of Lilundu, before his accession. He succeeded on the death of his elder brother Mwananyanda Liwale and was opposed by Kusiyo, but eventually triumphed after slaying the Nololo. He established his capital at Namuso and established orchards, tamed and domesticated wild animals and promulgated laws on property and marriage. He died at Lilundu, in the month of July, about 1830. Under his reign, the Mbunda tribe who had fled Angola as refugees fleeing the slave trade were allowed to settle in Barotseland.

== Family ==
Mulambwa had many children. His sons were kings Mubukwanu and Silumelume and his grandson was Sipopa Lutangu.
