= Kalabo District =

Coordinates: 15°00′S 22°30′E

- District
- Nickname: K city
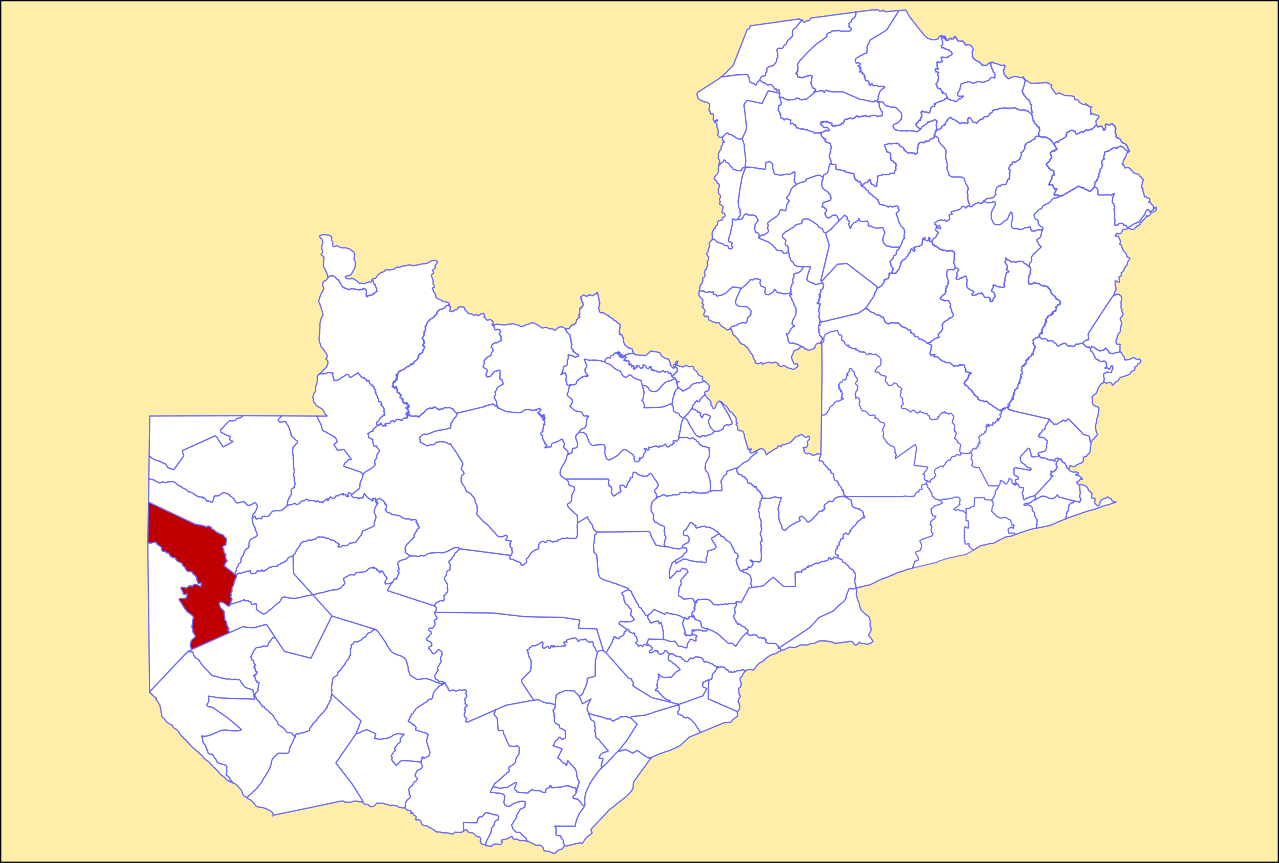
- District location in Zambia
- Country: Zambia
- Province: Western Province
- Capital: Kalabo

Area
  - Total: 9,066.5 km^{2} (3,500.6 sq mi)

Population (2022)
  - Total: 111,769
  - Density: 12.328/km^{2} (31.929/sq mi)
- Time zone: UTC+2 (CAT)

Kalabo District is a district of Zambia, located in Western Province. The capital lies at Kalabo. As of the 2022 Zambian Census, the district had a population of 111,769 people. The district contains the Liuwa Plain National Park.

It is divided into two constituencies, namely Kalabo Central and Liuwa.
