= Nyambe =

Supreme deity in Bantu religion

- Supreme god
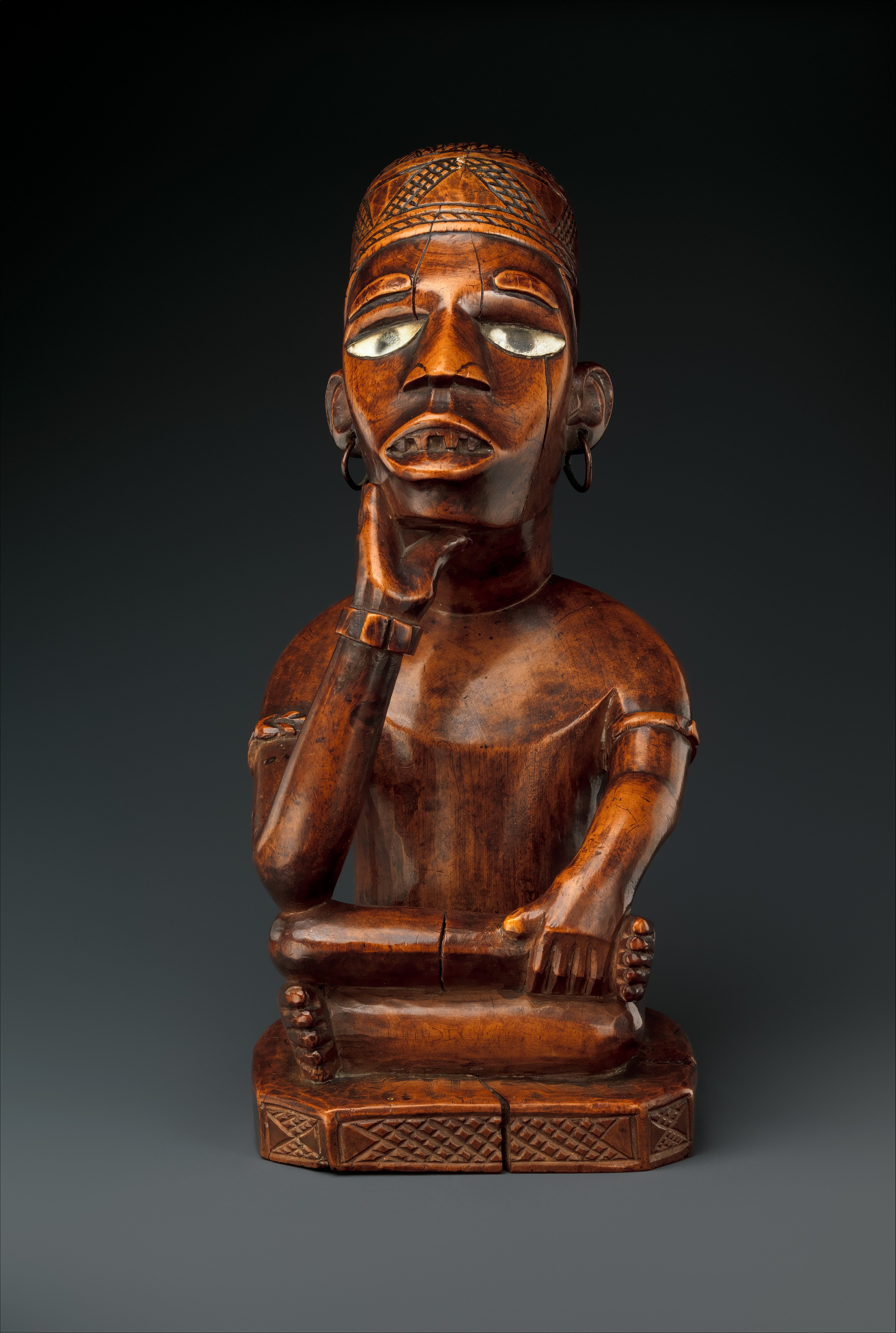
- Seated Male Figure, Angola or Democratic Republic of the Congo, Kongo peoples, Kakongo group (MET, 1996.281)
- Venerated in: Bantu mythology
- Symbols: Sun, Sky
- Ethnic group: Bantu peoples

Nyambe is the name used in various Bantu-speaking cultures to refer to the Supreme Being, the Creator of the universe, the Sky Father, god of the Sun and the source of all life. He is often described as all-powerful, all-knowing, and above all.

While different African cultures use various names for the Creator—such as Njambe, Njambi, Nyame, Nyambi, Nyembi, Nzambi, Nzambe, Nzemi—the concept remains largely the same: a single, supreme God who watches over his creation as a sky father. So far, the Bakongo people are the only known people to have also identified Nzambi as a goddess and Sky Mother.

== Central Africa ==
=== Bakongo people ===
The Bakongo of the Democratic Republic of the Congo, Angola, Gabon, and the Republic of the Congo believe in the Supreme god Nzambi Ampungu (or Nzambi Sundidi), along with a female counterpart, Nzambici. Nzambi symbolises the sun, while Nzambici represents the moon and earth. They both reside in the sky.

=== Bassa people ===
The Bassa of Cameroon refer to the Supreme Being as Ngambi or Nyombe. After the Bible was translated into Bassa in 1922, Ngambi became associated with the Christian God. Because of their deep respect for elders, Ngambi is also seen as the greatest Elder.

=== Chokwe people ===
The Chokwe people of northeast Angola believe in Nzambi, also called Kalûnga (meaning "the god of change") and Samatanga (meaning "the creator"). The king, or Mwanangana, is viewed as Nzambi's representative and links the physical and spiritual worlds.

=== Fang people ===
The Fang people of Gabon and Cameroon believe in the Supreme God Nzeme, also known as Mebere. In Fang cosmology, Nzeme created life and three spirits: Nzame (strength), Mbere (leadership), and Nkwa (beauty).

=== Lele people ===
The Lele people of the Democratic Republic of the Congo refer to the Supreme Being as Njambi. He is said to have created the forest and water spirits called mingehe, similar to the bisimbi of Kongo religion.

== East Africa ==
=== Toro people ===
The Nyoro and Toro people of Uganda refer to the Supreme God as Nyamuhanga.

== Southern Africa ==
=== Hambukushu people ===
The Hambukushu or "Rainmakers of Okavango" believe in Nyambi, who created the world and placed their people in the sacred hills of Tsodilo. Nyambi rewards the good by sending them to heaven (Diwiru) and punishes the wicked through his death messenger, Shadapinyi.

=== Herero people ===
The Herero people believe in a creator god called Njambi Kurunga, also known as Omukuru. He created the world, spirits, and humans, then withdrew into the sky.

=== Lozi people ===
For the Lozi people, Nyambe is regarded as the Supreme Being, the Creator of the world, and the source of all life. He is often described as all-powerful, all-knowing, and above all things. Nyambe is widely honoured as the one true God, who watches over creation like a loving father.

== West Africa ==
=== Akan people ===
The Akan people, including the Fante and Asante people, believe in the Creator God Nyame or Onyankopong. He created the heavens (Osoro) and the earth (Asaase). Another name, Odomankoma, means "the infinite one whose beginning and end are unknown."

== See also ==
- Bantu mythology
- Lozi mythology
