= Sunday (name) =

Notable people with the name Sunday include:

== Surname ==
=== Sports ===
- Augustina Ebhomien Sunday (born 1996), Nigerian badminton player
- Billy Sunday (1862–1935), American baseball player and evangelist
- Dave Sunday (footballer) (born 1947), Zambian footballer
- Esther Sunday (born 1992), Nigerian footballer
- Ibrahim Sunday (born 1950), Ghanaian footballer
- Joel Sunday (born 1988), Nigerian footballer
- Johnson Sunday (born 1981), Nigerian footballer
- Mueng Sunday (born 1994), Nigerian footballer
- Obaji Sunday (born 1988), Nigerian footballer
- Oriola Sunday (born 2003), Nigerian footballer
- Patrick Sunday (born 1975), Nigerian footballer
- Stephen Sunday (born 1988), Nigerian-born Spanish footballer
- Uchechi Sunday (born 1994), Nigerian footballer

=== Other ===
- Daku Sunday, Nigerian politician
- Dave Sunday (politician) (born 1975), American politician
- Edward Sunday (born 1973), Nigerian record producer
- Elisabeth Sunday (born 1958), American photographer
- Gabriel Sunday (born 1985), American actor
- Helen Thompson Sunday (1868–1957), American evangelist
- John Sunday Jr. (1838–1925), American politician
- Joy Sunday (born 1996), Nigerian-American actress
- Nkechi Blessing Sunday (born 1989), Nigerian actress

=== Fictional characters ===
- Ruby Sunday, fictional character in the British science fiction series Doctor Who.
- Eli & Paul Sunday, fictional characters in the movie There Will Be Blood.

== Given name ==
=== Politics ===
- Sunday Afolabi (politician) (1931–2010), Nigerian politician
- Sunday Aghedo, Nigerian politician
- Sunday Awoniyi (1932–2007), Nigerian politician
- Sunday Chanda (born 1976), Zambian politician
- Sunday Fada Eigbiremonlen (born 1973), Nigerian politician
- Sunday Essang (born 1940), Nigerian politician
- Sunday Fajinmi (born 1952), Nigerian politician
- Sunday Karimi (born 1962), Nigerian politician
- Sunday Marshall Katung (born 1961), Nigerian politician
- Sunday Oladimeji (born 1963), Nigerian politician
- Sunday Abiodun Olukoya (1949–2021), Nigerian politician and navy officer
- S. K. E. Udeh-Okoye (Sunday Kelly Enemchukwu Udeh-Okoye; born 1978), Nigerian politician
- Sunday Cyriacus Umeha (born 1983), Nigerian politician and lawyer

=== Sports ===
==== Football ====
- Sunday Abalo (born 1995), Nigerian footballer
- Sunday Adetunji (born 1997), Nigerian footballer
- Sunday Afolabi (footballer) (born 1999), Nigerian footballer
- Sunday Akinbule (born 1996), Nigerian footballer
- Sunday Chibuike (born 1982), Nigerian footballer
- Sunday Chidzambwa (born 1952), Zimbabwean footballer and coach
- Sunday Chizoba (born 1989), Nigerian footballer
- Sunday Emmanuel (footballer) (born 1992), Nigerian footballer
- Sunday Faleye (born 1998), Nigerian footballer
- Sunday Ibrahim (born 1980), Nigerian footballer
- Sunday Ingbede (born 1998), Nigerian footballer
- Sunday Jang (born 1970), Cameroonian footballer
- Sunday Kayuni, Tanzanian football manager
- Sunday Manara (born 1952), Tanzanian footballer
- Sunday Mba (born 1988), Nigerian footballer
- Sunday Odhiambo, Kenyan footballer
- Sunday Patrick Okoro (born 1986), Nigerian footballer
- Sunday Oliseh (born 1974), Nigerian footballer
- Sunday Oyarekhua (died 2021), Nigerian footballer
- Sunday Rotimi (born 1980), Nigerian footballer
- Sunday Seah (born 1978), Liberian footballer

==== Basketball ====
- Sunday Adebayo (born 1973), Nigerian basketball player
- Sunday Dech (born 1994), South Sudanese-Australian basketball player
- Sunday Salvacion (born 1978), Filipino basketball player

==== Other ====
- Sunday Akpata (1937–2024), Nigerian athlete
- Sunday Aryang (born 2000), Ethopian-Australian netball player
- Sunday Bada (1969–2011), Nigerian sprinter
- Sunday Emmanuel (athlete) (1978–2004), Nigerian sprinter
- Sunday Maku (born 1979), Nigerian tennis player
- Sunday Mathias (born 1980), Nigerian weightlifter
- Sunday Maweni (born 1959), Botswana sprinter
- Sunday Olweny (born 1967), Ugandan sprinter
- Sunday Uti (born 1962), Nigerian sprinter

=== Other ===
- Sunday Adelaja (born 1967), Nigerian pastor
- Sunday Ajibade Adenihun (1939–2006), Nigerian military governor
- Sunday Adewusi (1936–2016), Nigerian policeman
- Sunday Jack Akpan (born 1940), Nigerian sculptor
- Sunday Aneke (born 1972), Nigerian Air Force officer
- Sunday Paul Bako (born 1962), Nigerian academic
- Sunday Akin Dare (born 1966), Nigerian journalist
- Sunday Ehindero, Nigerian police officer
- Sunday Elom (born 1961), Nigerian academic
- Sunday O. Fadulu (1940–2022), Nigerian microbiologist
- Sunday Ifere (born 1943), Nigerian army officer
- Sunday Igboho (born 1972), Nigerian activist
- Sunday Mbang (1936–2023), Nigerian pastor
- Sunday Muse, Canadian actress
- Sunday Nobody, American meme and prank artist
- Sunday Ododo (born 1962), Nigerian academic
- Sunday Omobolanle (born 1954), Nigerian actor and filmmaker
- Sunday Omony, Ugandan-Canadian model and activist
- Sunday Onuoha (born 1964), Nigerian bishop
- Sunday Popoola (born 1955), Nigerian pastor
- Sunday Reantaso (1898–1948), Filipino-American entertainer
- Sunday Reed (1905–1981), Australian art collector and patron
- Sunday Tuoyo (1935–2022), Nigerian military governor
- Sunday Wilshin (1905–1991), British actress
