= Kitwe Boys Secondary School =

Location
- Kumboka Drive Parklands; Parklands, Copperbelt 50100; Zambia

Information
- Type: Public
- Motto: Success Through Labour.
- Established: 1957
- School district: Kitwe District
- Headmaster: Steven Musto
- Teaching staff: (on a FTE, basis)
- Campus type: Suburban
- Colors: Brown, and blue (navy)
- Nickname: Kibo
- Website: facebook.com/kitweboys

Kitwe Boys Secondary School was built in the year 1957 in Kitwe, Zambia. During that time, the school was only for white students before Zambia became independent in 1964. The headmaster was Mr J Hall. It is located in Kitwe park lands near Kitwe Central Hospital.

== History ==
During the struggle for independence, most people in Zambia recall segregation that existed in terms of access to housing and recreation, and social amenities such as schools, hospitals, shops, among other things. In Kitwe, for example, there were schools that were exclusively for the whites and those that were for black people. During this time, black and white people could not share. Initially the school was a co-education one, with building of the proposed Girls' High School, next door, having been 'completed' in 1959 but it was only in 1962 that the former one became entirely boys' school. "This school was strictly for the whites only. This is where the children of most white expatriates working in the mines used to come to. African children were not allowed. The location of the white-dominated schools was prohibitive because the schools were located in areas that were out of bounds for the black community.

Kitwe Boys Secondary School After Independence

Although independence was attained in 1964 and freedom guaranteed to all regardless of race, the racial segregation of the colonial years could still be retraced through school infrastructure. In Zambia schools that were predominantly white had to be different from those found in schools that were built for blacks. it is easy to see the difference in terms of design and social amenities, Although both sets of infrastructure have had their own share of deterioration over the years.

== Primary schools ==
Schools such as Frederick Knapp (now Rokana Primary School) had beautiful infrastructure with spacious classrooms, amenities such as swimming pools, excellent pupil- to teacher ratio, and a school hall among other things. Pupils that graduated to go and learn at Kitwe Boys High School came from Frederick Knapp was among the only primary school for the white community in Kitwe. other schools were Prince Charles Primary School (now Matete Secondary School), Riverrain, Valley View and Kitwe Primary School, among others.

== Appearance ==
Kitwe Boys Secondary School had spacious classrooms, school halls, swimming pools, and sports facilities such as volleyball and tennis courts among others. The dominated schools such as Kitwe Main, Wusakile, Mutende and Mindolo primary schools which did not have those facilities. These schools had small structures, had no sports facilities or assembly halls. Whereas white children had their assemblies in school halls where they were able to sit comfortably, black children had their gatherings outside. During this time, it was difficult for black people to access secondary education in those days.

== Sports activities ==
Athletics' activities comprised three competing houses namely Eagle, Falcon and Hawk covering all of the customary track and field events culminating in an annual inter-house and inter-schools events. Besides cricket and rugby, one was spoilt for choice be it soccer, hockey, basketball, lawn tennis or swimming. Also had woodwork club, a chess club, a young farmers club, a school choir, a gymnastics club, badminton and lawn tennis clubs, a rowing club, a dramatic society, a photographic society, a printing press and a contingent of school cadets. Most of these activities were also competed against other schools but not necessarily on an annual basis. The School offered subjects such as physics, chemistry and mathematics made tertiary education a less onerous undertaking within the mechanical engineering field.

== School uniform ==
Regarding the school uniform, long-sleeved white shirts had to be worn full length i.e. it was forbidden to wear the sleeves folded part-way up the forearm. Haircuts had to be appropriate i.e. no dyed or long hair covering one's ears. The school tie had also to be worn full time. Additionally, one had to wear a straw boater (basher) as part of one's school uniform while in public view to and from school.

== Kitwe boys and Hellen Kaunda ==
There was no boundary wall between Kitwe Girls and Kitwe Boys schools and this had continued for years until the two schools had to be separated. Helen Kaunda Girls Secondary School was opened before independence in January 1957 and was known as Kitwe Girls Secondary School. The school had more white pupils than Zambian ones and the head teachers were British expatriates. Had best facilities in terms of sports and recreation such as swimming pool, basketball court, netball and tennis courts among other things. The swimming pool, though not functional, is located at the girls' school while the washrooms are in the boys' school. After independence, Kitwe Girls was renamed Helen Kaunda Secondary School in honour of President Kaunda's mother. And in 1964 one still had a handful of girls coming over to the boys' school, and vice versa, for tuition in particular subjects possibly because of a shortage of teaching staff. Kitwe Boys' High School was also well-managed and controlled establishment with strict discipline being the order of the day to which the bulk of the scholars adhered.

== Kenneth kaunda ==
Under the government of Kenneth Kaunda School books were issued to the scholars and these had to be covered in brown (butchers) paper to preserve same. One was punished for non-adherence to this ruling to the extent of two to three strokes of the cane being dispensed to serious defaulters so, needless to say, books were always immaculately covered.

=== Subjects ===
The school offered GCE 'O' and 'A' level curricula and then an 'M' level in 1964 (one year's study after 'O' level instead of two) which gained one entry, specifically, into a South African university Among other qualifications, .
