= Northern Rhodesia Government Gazette =

Government gazette of Northern Rhodesia

The Northern Rhodesia Government Gazette was the government gazette of Northern Rhodesia.

The Gazette replaced the North-Eastern Rhodesia Gazette when North-Eastern and North-Western Rhodesia were merged into Northern Rhodesia. There was no gazette for North-Western Rhodesia.

The Gazette was published by the British South Africa Company from 1911 until it was taken over by the Colonial Office in 1924 when they assumed responsibility for Northern Rhodesia. It continued until independence in 1964 when it was replaced by the Zambian government gazette.

== See also ==
- List of British colonial gazettes
