= North-Eastern Rhodesia Gazette =

Government gazette of North-Eastern Rhodesia

The North-Eastern Rhodesia Gazette was the government gazette of North-Eastern Rhodesia.

The Gazette was published by the British South Africa Company from 17 August 1903 to 1911 at Fort Jameson when it was replaced by the Northern Rhodesia Government Gazette following the amalgamation of North-Eastern and Barotziland-North-Western Rhodesia into Northern Rhodesia.

== See also ==
- List of British colonial gazettes
