= Dave Sunday =

Dave Sunday may refer to:

- Dave Sunday (footballer) (born 1947), Zambian goalkeeper
- Dave Sunday (politician) (born 1975), American politician
