= Rhodesia (region) =

Historical region in southern Africa

Coordinates: 15°40′S 28°10′E

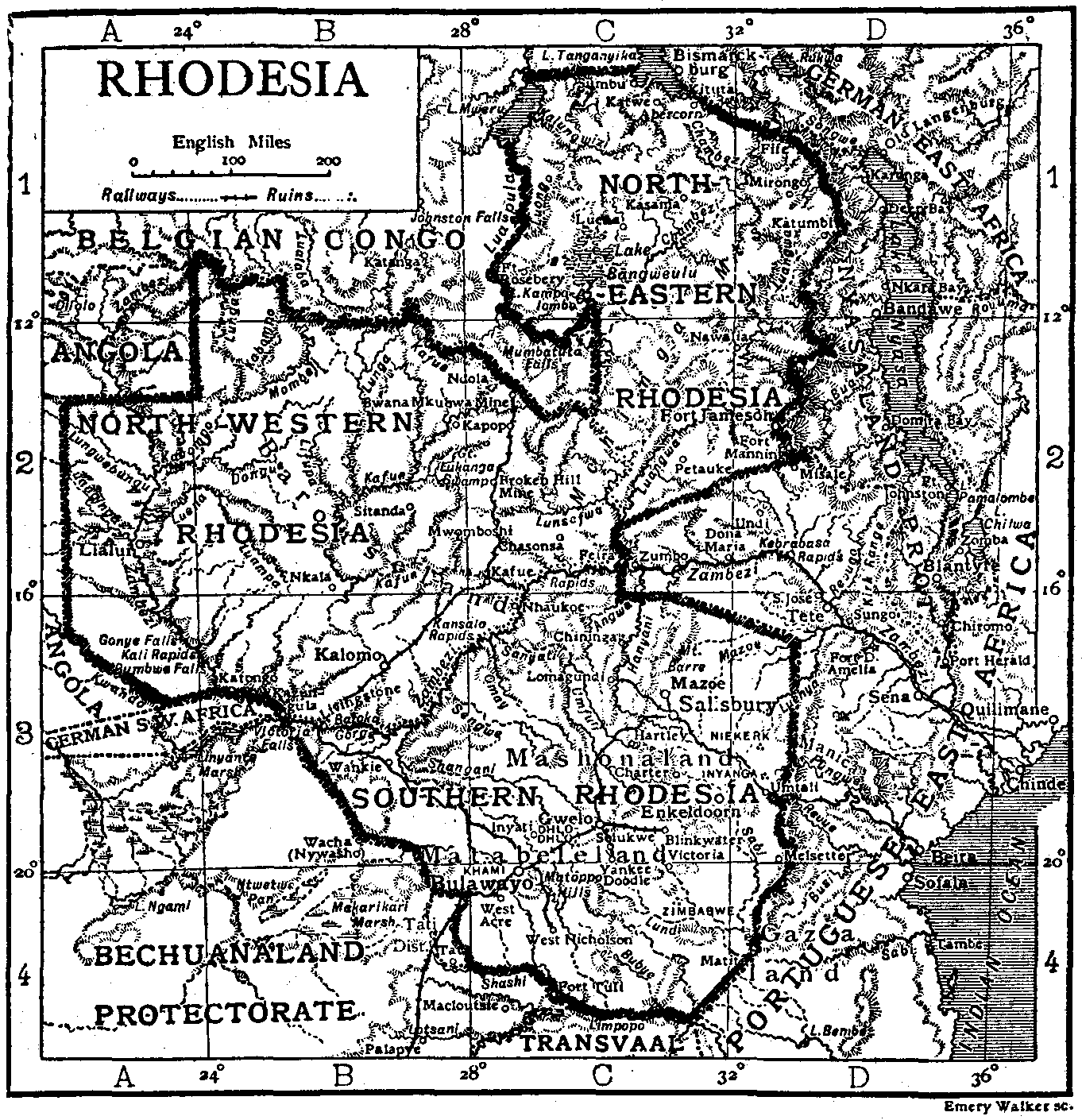
"Rhodesia", depicted in the 1911 Encyclopædia Britannica, showing North-Western and North-Eastern Rhodesia—amalgamated that same year into Northern Rhodesia (Zambia since 1964)—and Southern Rhodesia (renamed Zimbabwe in 1980)

Rhodesia, known initially as Zambesia, is a historical region in southern Africa whose formal boundaries evolved between the 1890s and 1980. The term "Rhodesia" was first used to refer to the region by European settlers (and newspapers) in the 1890s who informally named their new home after Cecil Rhodes, the founder and managing director of the British South Africa Company (BSAC). The company initiated colonisation of the region and governed it under British charter from 1889 until the 1920s.

The region was bisected by a natural border, the Zambezi. BSAC designated the territory to the north of the Zambezi as North-Eastern Rhodesia and Barotziland–North-Western Rhodesia (or just North-Western Rhodesia informally). In 1911, BSAC combined the two as Northern Rhodesia, and this territory became a British Protectorate in the 1920s and then Zambia on independence in 1964. The territory to the south of the Zambezi was designated Southern Rhodesia by the company, and it became Zimbabwe in 1980 after going through two interim name changes. Northern and Southern Rhodesia were sometimes informally called "the Rhodesias". From 1953 to 1963 Northern and Southern Rhodesia were federated with Nyasaland, now Malawi, as the Federation of Rhodesia and Nyasaland.

The usage of the term Rhodesia to refer to the historical region fell from prominence after Northern Rhodesia became Zambia in 1964, and thereafter "Rhodesia" commonly referred to Southern Rhodesia alone. It had become a self-governing colony of the United Kingdom in 1923, and it referred to itself simply as "Rhodesia" from 1964 to 1979, and in 1965 unilaterally declared independence under that name. This has been the source of some confusion by people unaware that Northern Rhodesia was never part of the 1964 to 1979 'Rhodesia'.

In 1979 Rhodesia briefly renamed itself "Zimbabwe Rhodesia".

Since 1980 the name Rhodesia has not been in general use outside historical contexts.

== Etymology ==
When Europeans settled what became "Southern Rhodesia" in 1890, and when the British South Africa Company was chartered to administer "North-Western Rhodesia" and "North-Eastern Rhodesia", it was not under those names, but the names of the parts—"Mashonaland", "Matabeleland", "Barotseland", and so on. The territories were initially collectively referred to as "Zambesia" (Cecil Rhodes's preferred name), "Charterland" (Leander Starr Jameson's proposal) or "the BSAC territories".

"Rhodesia" was used informally by the settlers from the start of European settlement, and was common enough usage for newspapers to start using it in articles in 1891. In 1892 it was used for the name of the first newspaper in Salisbury, The Rhodesia Herald. The BSAC officially adopted the name "Rhodesia" in May 1895, and the British government followed in 1898. "It is not clear why the name should have been pronounced with the emphasis on the second rather than the first syllable," Robert Blake comments, "but this appears to have been the custom from the beginning and it never changed."

The first official use of "Rhodesia" was actually for a boma on Lake Mweru, established in 1892 near the mouth of the Kalungwishi River under the authority of Alfred Sharpe, the British Commissioner of the British Central Africa protectorate in Nyasaland. After "Rhodesia" became the official name of the territories in 1895, the boma's name was changed to "Kalungwishi". It was closed some years later.

Although "Northern Rhodesia" was not an official name until 1911 when Barotziland–North-Western Rhodesia and North-Eastern Rhodesia were combined, the name was used informally from 1895 onwards when referring to those two territories collectively.

== History ==
=== Present-day Zambia ===
- North-Western Rhodesia—British South Africa Company (BSAC) administered—1890;
- North-Western Rhodesia and North-Eastern Rhodesia—Protectorates—1893;
- North-Eastern Rhodesia—BSAC administered—1897;
- Barotziland-North-Western Rhodesia and North-Eastern Rhodesia—Amalgamated but administered separately—1899–1911;
- Northern Rhodesia—Protectorate under BSAC —1911–1924;
- Northern Rhodesia—British protectorate—1924–1953;
- Federation of Rhodesia and Nyasaland—Territory of Northern Rhodesia—1953–1964;
- Zambia—Independence granted—1964 onwards.

=== Present-day Zimbabwe ===
- Mashonaland and Matabeleland—BSAC protectorates—1888–1894;
- South Zambezia—Mashonaland and Matabeleland combined—1894–1895;
- Rhodesia—Protectorate combined with North Zambezia—1895–1901;
- Southern Rhodesia—South Zambezia separated from Northern Rhodesia—1901–1923;
- Southern Rhodesia—BSAC charter ends; British colony, with self-rule—1923–1953;
- Federation of Rhodesia and Nyasaland—Territory of Southern Rhodesia, retaining self-rule—1953–1963;
- Southern Rhodesia—Federation dissolved; British colony, retaining self-rule—1964–1965;
- Rhodesia—Unilateral Declaration of Independence, unrecognised state—1965–1979 (self-declared republic from 1970);
- Zimbabwe Rhodesia—Internal Settlement government, also unrecognised—1979;
- Southern Rhodesia—Lancaster House Agreement, temporary British colonial rule—1979–1980;
- Zimbabwe—recognised independence granted—1980 onwards.

== Public holidays ==
Public holidays observed in Rhodesia were largely based around milestones in the region's short history. Annual holidays marked various aspects of the arrival of white people to the region during the 1880s and 1890s, as well as the respective unilateral declarations of independence (1965) and of republican government (1970). On these days, most businesses and non-essential services closed. A number of Christian holidays were also observed according to custom, in the traditional British manner, and referred to in official documents by name—Christmas Day, for example, or Easter Monday.

== Bibliography ==
- "Public Holidays". Rhodesia Calls. Salisbury: Rhodesia National Tourist Board: 48, 91. November–December 1972.
