= Robert Edward Codrington =

British colonial administrator (1869–1908)

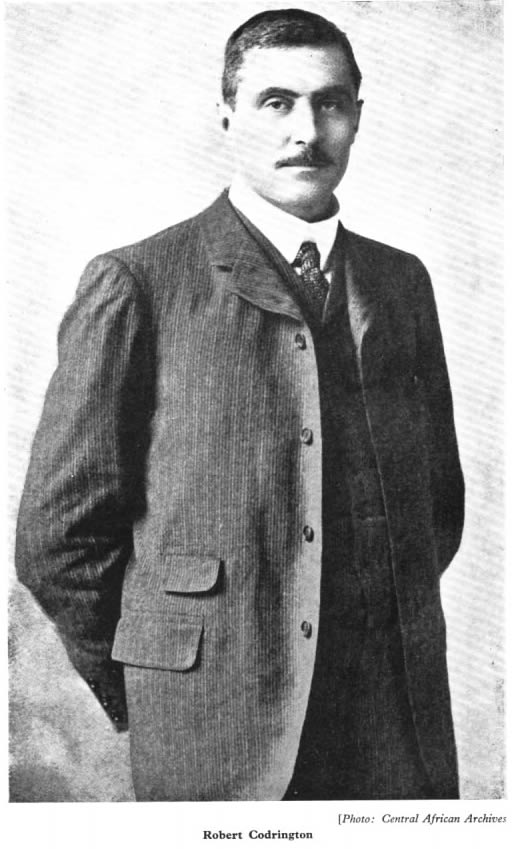
Robert Codrington, 1900

Robert Edward Codrington (6 January 1869 – 16 December 1908) was the colonial Administrator of the two territories ruled by the British South Africa Company (BSAC) which became present-day Zambia. He was Administrator of North-Eastern Rhodesia, based at Fort Jameson, now Chipata, from 11 July 1898 to 24 April 1907, and then of North-Western Rhodesia, based at Livingstone from February 1908 to his death in London on 16 December 1908 from heart disease at age 39. He laid the foundation for the amalgamation of the two territories as Northern Rhodesia four years later.

His administration was influential in establishing British colonial government in Northern Rhodesia and Nyasaland and making them different in character from white-settler-led Southern Rhodesia.

== Background ==
Codrington was born in the United Kingdom into a Gloucestershire family with a background of service in the Royal Navy, but instead he went to southern Africa and joined the Bechuanaland Border Police in 1890. In 1893 this force took part in the occupation of Matabeleland by white settlers, the overthrow of its ruler, Lobengula, and the taking of African land by force, which still has violent consequences in today's Zimbabwe.

== Nyasaland ==
Codrington was then appointed Collector of Revenue in the British Central Africa Protectorate, also known as Nyasaland (later Malawi). He rose rapidly through the colonial ranks and as a result of his military experience he was given the job of conquering the Ngoni and Yao by force and stamping out the last vestiges of the slave trade in the area.

He was a practical man and he solved the shortage of British people in the territory available to run the administration by appointing Africans educated by the Scottish missionaries in Nyasaland. In this way he helped support education generally and establish a group of Nyasaland African administrators (though he kept them subordinate to the whites) who were influential there and in Northern Rhodesia. This set him against the settlers especially in Southern Rhodesia who opposed education and employment of native people other than in manual labour.

== North-Eastern and North-Western Rhodesia ==
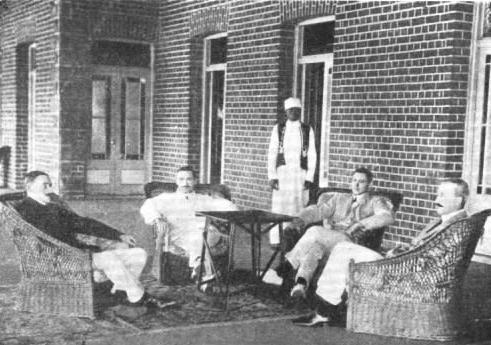
Sir Robert Codrington (second from left) at Government House, Livingstone in 1907 with other British officials.

He came to the attention of Cecil Rhodes who appointed him at the age of 29 as Deputy Administrator, later Administrator (equivalent to Governor), of North-Eastern Rhodesia, charged with subduing by force any opposition to the BSAC's rule. He used military approaches to administration and leadership, and his African nickname 'Mara' relates to his saying 'it is settled', by which he terminated any discussion, reflecting his use of his authority. He brought in staff and workers from Nyasaland.

Although he saw the value in allowing missions in his new territory to provide educated personnel and tradesmen (since the BSAC did not provide such education), he controlled the incursion of missionaries to prevent conflict with tribes such as the Bemba who might be hostile to them. His administration initially told the French Catholic bishop Joseph Dupont that he had to leave, even though he had set up in Bemba territory before Codrington arrived on the scene, had opened up Bemba lands to the British, and had been accepted so completely he had been offered a Bemba chieftainship. However, Codrington saw the practical value of Dupont staying and invited him to sit next to him at a Bemba coronation.

He worked closely with Alfred Sharpe, the Governor in Nyasaland, and with the latter's military assistance ensured the subjugation of the Bemba and the Kazembe-Lunda.

In 1907, Codrington was appointed Administrator of North-Western Rhodesia based at Livingstone, but only served a year before his death. In that time he reorganised its administration in a similar fashion to North-Eastern Rhodesia, paving the way for the two territories to be merged in 1911.

== Ethnological collection and writing ==
Codrington studied ethnological aspects of Africa, and collected cultural artefacts. While some of these had been taken from their rightful owners by slave traders whom he had defeated, many valuable pieces including very old works of Luba origin were taken from the court of Mwata Kazembe by the British punitive expedition sent by him against Mwata Kazembe X in 1897, and these he kept. They were placed in 1920 in a museum in Southern Rhodesia, 1000 km from their Kazembe-Lunda owners. He wrote a number of articles for the Royal Geographical Society.

== Legacy ==
Codrington was, after Cecil Rhodes, one of the chief architects of British rule in central Africa. Although portrayed by some writers as kind and just, he was paternalistic towards Africans and uncompromising in his view of the superiority of the British. Though he had taken part in the bloody events in Matabeleland, three aspects of his later work influenced the course of history north of the Zambezi in more peaceful ways.

He encouraged African education and employed them in administration, he instigated indirect rule through local chiefs, and he opposed rule by white settlers, keeping it firmly in the hands of trained administrators. These factors helped put Zambia and Malawi on a different path from Southern Rhodesia, helping them gain peaceful independence more than fifteen years before Zimbabwe.

== See also ==
- British South Africa Company
- Northern Rhodesia
- Zambia
- Malawi
