= Zambia Independence Act 1964 =

Act of the Parliament of the United Kingdom

Zambia Independence Act 1964 (Note: Section 11(1).)
- Act of Parliament
- Parliament of the United Kingdom
- Long title: An Act to make provision for, and in connection with, the establishment of Northern Rhodesia, under the name of Zambia, as an independent republic within the Commonwealth.
- Citation: 1964 c. 65
- Introduced by: Andrew Cavendish, 11th Duke of Devonshire Under-Secretary of State for Commonwealth Relations (Lords)
- Territorial extent: United Kingdom

Dates
- Royal assent: 31 July 1964
- Commencement: 24 October 1964 (Note: Section 1.)
Other legislation
Amended by	Statute Law (Repeals) Act 1969; Finance Act 1969; Civil Aviation Act 1971; Statute Law (Repeals) Act 1974; Statute Law (Repeals) Act 1976; Statute Law (Repeals) Act 1977; International Organisations Act 1981; British Nationality Act 1981; Family Law Act 1986; Copyright, Designs and Patents Act 1988; Commonwealth Act 2002; Armed Forces Act 2006

Status: Amended

Text of statute as originally enacted

Revised text of statute as amended

Text of the Zambia Independence Act 1964 as in force today (including any amendments) within the United Kingdom, from legislation.gov.uk.

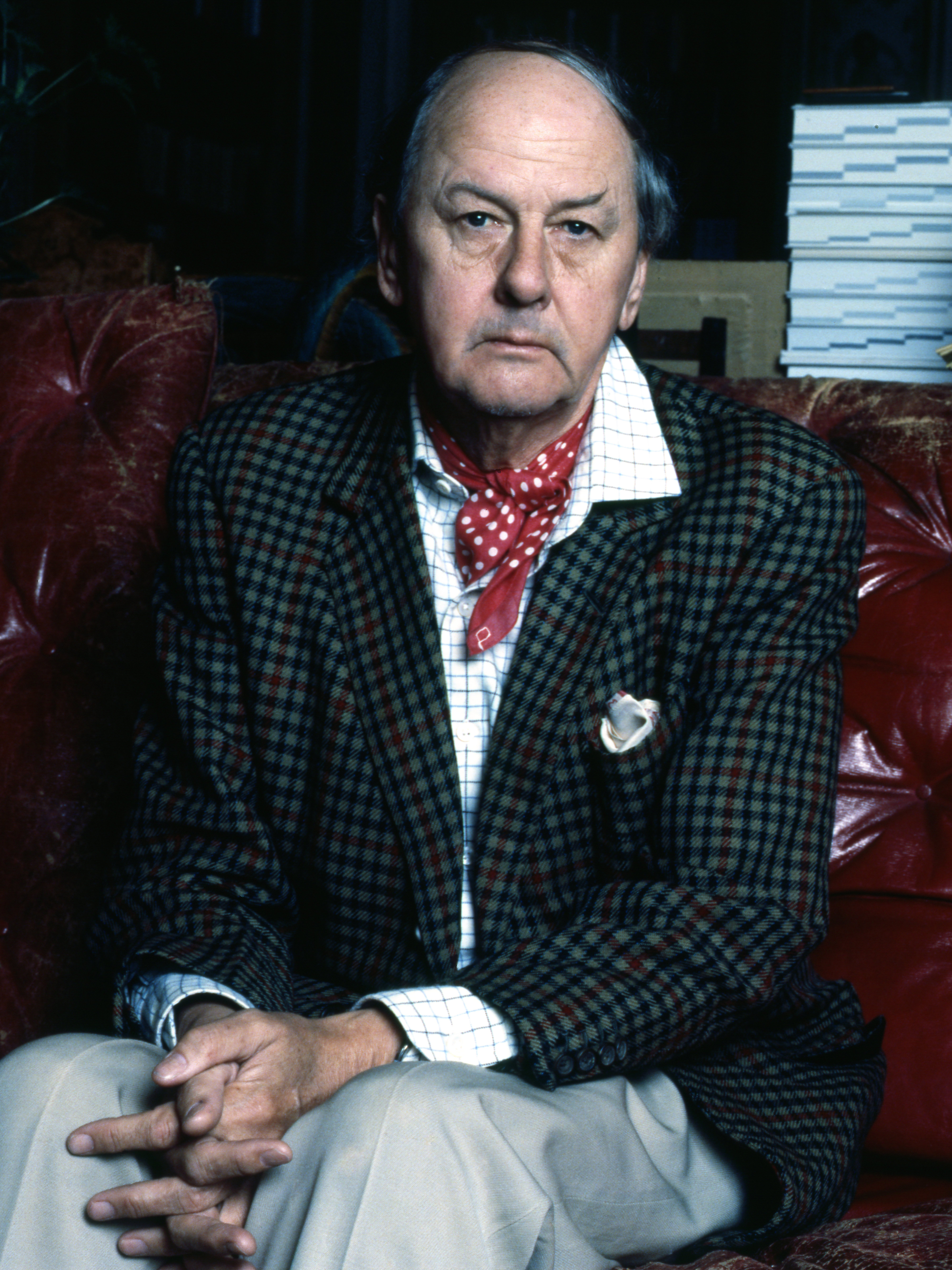
Andrew Cavendish, 11th Duke of Devonshire introduced the bill to Parliament

The Zambia Independence Act 1964 (c. 65) is an act of the Parliament of the United Kingdom which granted independence to Zambia (formerly the protectorate of Northern Rhodesia) with effect from 24 October 1964. It also provided for the continuation of a right of appeal from Zambia to the Judicial Committee of the Privy Council. It was introduced by Andrew Cavendish, 11th Duke of Devonshire Under-Secretary of State for Commonwealth Relations.

== Background ==
=== British South Africa Company ===
In 1888, the British South Africa Company (BSA Company), led by Cecil Rhodes, obtained mineral rights from the Litunga of the Lozi people, the Paramount Chief of the Lozi (Ba-rotse) for the area which later became Barotziland-North-Western Rhodesia.

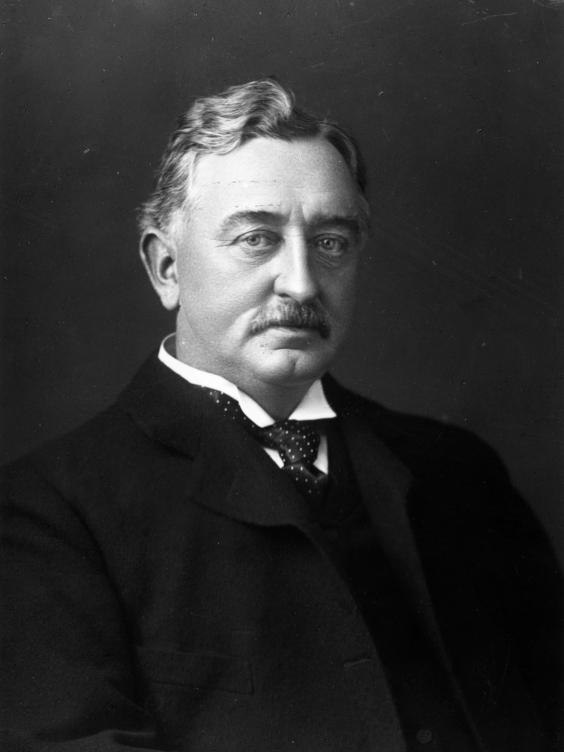
Cecil Rhodes

To the east, in December 1897 a group of the Angoni or Ngoni (originally from Zululand) rebelled under Tsinco, son of King Mpezeni, but the rebellion was put down, and Mpezeni accepted the Pax Britannica. That part of the country then came to be known as North-Eastern Rhodesia. In 1895, Rhodes asked his American scout Frederick Russell Burnham to look for minerals and ways to improve river navigation in the region, and it was during this trek that Burnham discovered major copper deposits along the Kafue River.

North-Eastern Rhodesia and Barotziland-North-Western Rhodesia were administered as separate units until 1911 when they were merged to form Northern Rhodesia, a British protectorate. In 1923, the BSA Company ceded control of Northern Rhodesia to the British Government after the government decided not to renew the company's charter.

=== British colonisation ===
In 1923, Southern Rhodesia (now Zimbabwe), a conquered territory that was also administered by the BSA Company, became a self-governing British colony. In 1924, after negotiations, the administration of Northern Rhodesia transferred to the British Colonial Office.

=== Federation of Rhodesia and Nyasaland ===
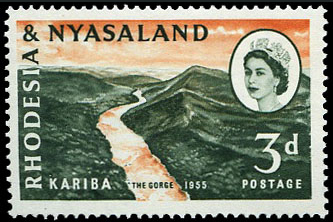
Stamp with portrait of Queen Elizabeth II, 1955

In 1953, the creation of the Federation of Rhodesia and Nyasaland grouped together Northern Rhodesia, Southern Rhodesia, and Nyasaland (now Malawi) as a single semi-autonomous region. This was undertaken despite opposition from a sizeable minority of the population, who demonstrated against it in 1960–61. Northern Rhodesia was the center of much of the turmoil and crisis characterizing the federation in its last years. Initially, Harry Nkumbula's African National Congress (ANC) led the campaign, which Kenneth Kaunda's United National Independence Party (UNIP) subsequently took up.

== Independence ==
A two-stage election held in October and December 1962 resulted in an African majority in the legislative council and an uneasy coalition between the two African nationalist parties. The council passed resolutions calling for Northern Rhodesia's secession from the federation and demanding full internal self-government under a new constitution and a new National Assembly based on a broader, more democratic franchise.

The federation was dissolved on 31 December 1963, and in January 1964, Kaunda won the only election for Prime Minister of Northern Rhodesia. The Colonial Governor, Sir Evelyn Hone, was very close to Kaunda and urged him to stand for the post. Soon after, there was an uprising in the north of the country known as the Lumpa Uprising led by Alice Lenshina – Kaunda's first internal conflict as leader of the nation.

Northern Rhodesia became the Republic of Zambia on 24 October 1964, with Kenneth Kaunda as the first president. At independence, despite its considerable mineral wealth, Zambia faced major challenges. Domestically, there were few trained and educated Zambians capable of running the government, and the economy was largely dependent on foreign expertise. This expertise was provided in part by John Willson CMG. There were over 70,000 Europeans resident in Zambia in 1964, and they remained of disproportionate economic significance.

== Subsequent developments ==
Section 11(3) of, and schedule 3 to, the act were repealed by section 1 of, and part XI of the schedule to, the Statute Law (Repeals) Act 1974, which came into force on 27 June 1974.

== Bibliography ==
- Whitaker's Almanack: for the year 1966, complete edition, p. 319. J. Whitaker & Sons, London, 1965
