= Omotayo Adeleye Ishaya =

Nigerian politician

Member of the Kogi State House of Assembly
- Constituency: Ijumu Constituency

Personal details
- Born: Kogi State, Nigeria
- Party: Peoples Democratic Party (PDP)
- Occupation: Politician

Omotayo Adeleye Ishaya is a Nigerian politician who currently serves as the representative for the Ijumu constituency at the Kogi State House of Assembly.
