= Lawrence Aubrey Wallace =

British colonial administrator

Sir Lawrence Aubrey Wallace KBE CMG (2 February 1857 - 26 February 1942) was a British colonial administrator. He was administrator of North-Eastern Rhodesia from April 1907 to January 1909, administrator of Barotziland-North-Western Rhodesia from January 1909 to August 1911, and administrator of Northern Rhodesia from August 1911 until March 1921.

He made an exploratory journey round Lake Tanganyika in August 1897, for which he received the Back Award of the Royal Geographical Society in 1912.

He died on 26 February 1942 in Le Mans due to natural causes. He's buried in the Grand Cimetière, Le Mans.

== Works ==
- 'The Beginnings of Native Administration in Northern Rhodesia', Journal of the African Society, 16 (1922), pp. 165–176
- 'Rhodesia', in The dominions and dependencies of the Empire. Vol. I of Hugh Gunn, ed., The British Empire: A survey, Collins, 1924
- 'Northern Rhodesia and the last phase of the war in Africa'. In vol. 4 (1926) of Charles Prestwood Lucas, ed., The Empire at War, Oxford University Press, 1921–26.
