= Daku Sunday =

Nigerian politician

Member of the Kogi State House of Assembly
- Constituency: Bassa Constituency

Personal details
- Born: Kogi State, Nigeria
- Party: Peoples Democratic Party
- Occupation: Politician

Daku Sunday is a Nigerian politician who currently serves as the representative for the Bassa constituency at the Kogi State House of Assembly.
