= Kaunda =

Kaunda is an African surname that may refer to the following notable people:

- Betty Kaunda (1928–2012), First Lady of Zambia, wife of Kenneth
- Billy Kaunda, Government minister of Malawi
- John Kaunda, Zambian football goalkeeper
- Kenneth Kaunda (1924–2021), first president of Zambia
  - Kenneth Kaunda International Airport
  - Dr Kenneth Kaunda District Municipality
- Mxolisi Kaunda (born 1972), South African politician
- Philemon Kaunda, Zambian football player
- Simon Vuwa Kaunda, Malawian politician
- Tilyenji Kaunda (born 1954), Zambian politician, son of Kenneth
- Yolanda Kaunda (born 1980), Malawian aviator
