= National Theatre, Nigeria =

Theater in Lagos, Nigeria

Coordinates: 6°28′35″N 3°22′10″E

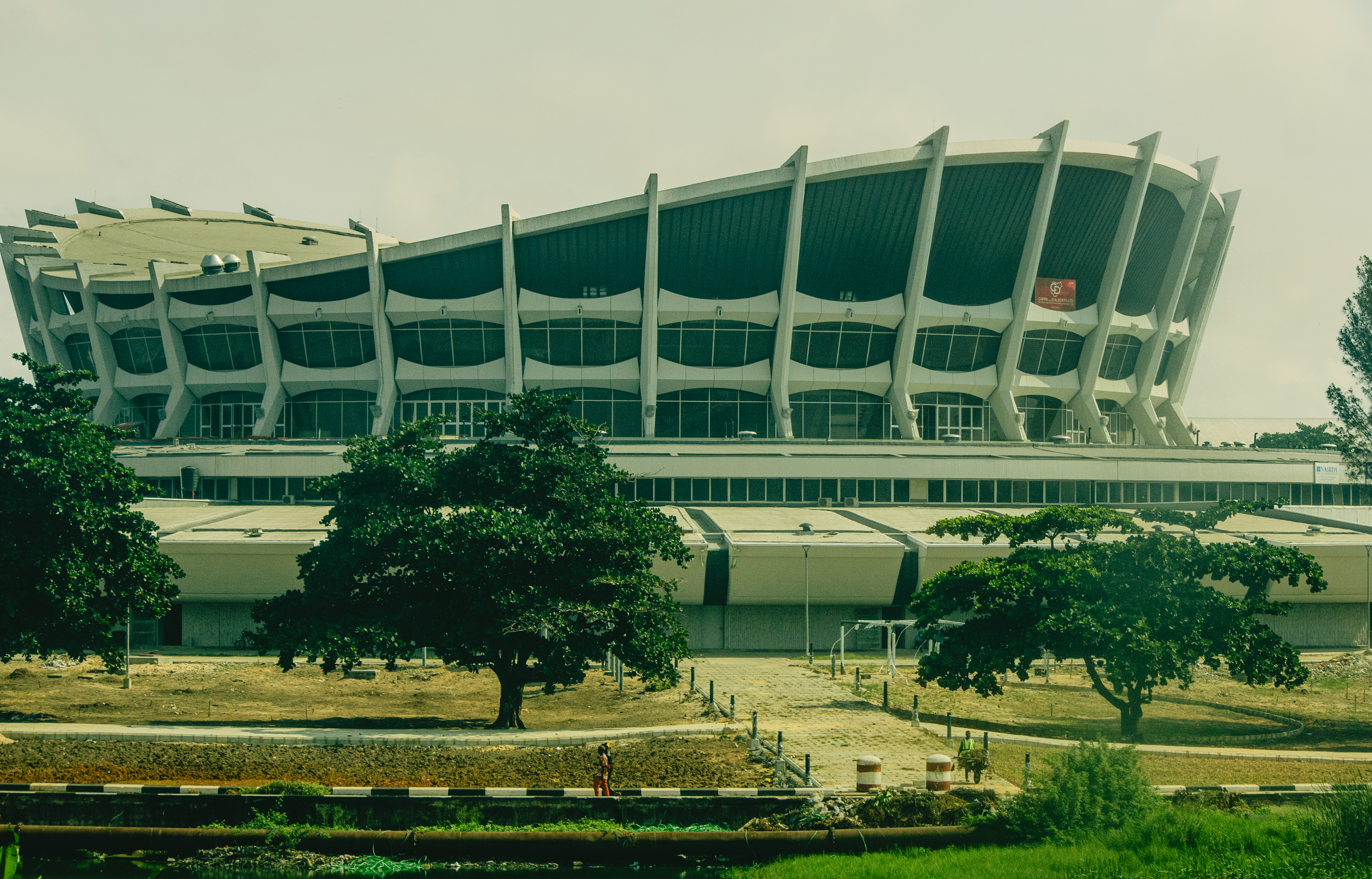
National Theatre Nigeria

The National Theatre, Nigeria now known as The Wole Soyinka Center for Culture and Creative Arts, Nigeria is the primary centre for the performing arts in Nigeria. It shares the same architectural design as the Palace of Culture and Sports in Varna, Bulgaria, and it is four times bigger. The monument is located in Iganmu, Surulere, Lagos. Its construction was completed in 1976 in preparation for the Festival of Arts and Culture (FESTAC) in 1977.

In July 2024, President Bola Tinubu renamed the Theatre in honor of Nobel Laureate Wole Soyinka.

== Design ==
Construction of The National Theatre was started by the military regime of General Yakubu Gowon and completed during the military regime of Olusegun Obasanjo. By the year 2021, this edifice had been run by a number of management teams with heads such as Jimmy Folorunso Atte (1991 – August 1999), Prof Babafemi A. Osofisan (2000 – 2004), Dr. Ahmed Parker Yerima (2006 – Aug 2009), Kabir Yusuf (2009 – 2016), George Ufot, (Late) Dr. (Mrs.) Stella Oyedepo, Sunday Enessi Ododo (2020–2024), Akerele Tola (2024 to present) The National Theatre exterior was designed, shaped and built to look like a military hat. It originally has capacity for a 5,000-seat Main Hall with a collapsible stage, and two capacity cinema halls, all of which are equipped with facilities for simultaneous translation of 8 languages; among others.

The National Theatre, Nigeria was designed and constructed by Bulgarian construction company (Techno Exporstroy). Alhaji Sule Katagum was a co-owner and also their chairman. It resembles the Palace of Culture and Sports in Varna, Bulgaria (completed in 1968); the National Theatre Lagos, Nigeria, being the bigger of the two.

=== Renovation (2020–2025) ===
The National Theatre renovation started in 2020 post-COVID through a joint collaboration with the government and private sector. The Bankers Committee is made up of banking institutions like Access Bank and Guarantee Trust Bank. The contractor for the renovation process was CAPPA D'ABERTO, who worked along with other subcontractors, like Nairda for electrical works, Zmirage for stage engineering, Filmhouse and SMO Contemporary Art for building curation, art preservation, and conservation works; SiSA for interior design of the main hall and lobby areas; YandT Designs for the interior spaces as well; and VACC for mechanical services. Major aspects of the renovation were finished in 2024, and the theater is expected to be opened sometime in 2025. A committee named SANEF was formed to supervise the activities of the restoration process.

=== Commissioning & Soyinka's acceptance ===
On 1 October 2025, the fully renovated complex was officially commissioned and re-dedicated as the Wole Soyinka Centre for Culture and the Creative Arts during Nigeria's 65th Independence Day celebrations.

In his address, Prof. Wole Soyinka explained that he accepted the renaming with "mixed feelings" because he has historically criticised the custom of naming public monuments after individuals. He said he once believed the theatre was beyond redemption and even joked that it should be blown up, but acknowledged that the Bankers' Committee's work made him "eat his words." He also recounted dangers posed by the building's disrepair (such as leaking roofs, exposed wiring, and risk to actors), and invoked nostalgia for the original FESTAC '77 era when the theatre first stood in glory.

President Tinubu used the occasion to announce the establishment of a National Arts Theatre Endowment Fund to secure ongoing maintenance.

== Design spaces ==
=== Banquet hall ===
The banquet hall serves as a multipurpose space used primarily for ceremonial gatherings, performances, and institutional events. Architecturally, it integrates aesthetics and acoustic considerations. A pair of standing wooden sculptures flanks the space, while ten carved wooden panels are positioned on the stage backdrop; each panel carries intricate iconography rooted in Nigerian storytelling traditions.
There are two mosaic artworks on the walls on either side of the stage; they add texture and colour while also enhancing the room's visual rhythm. By absorbing sound and lowering reverberation, the blue rug-patterned flooring improves acoustic performance. A curvilinear stage and a gallery behind the hall were purposefully created to hold lighting rigs and technical equipment. The walls are lined with two fiberglass friezes at opposite ends of each other, each about 2.4 meters long and 0.75 meters wide, which function as ornamental and interpretive narrative art.

=== Exhibition room ===
The theater's two primary display halls are designed to be adaptable, open-volume areas. These are employed to support gallery operations such as installations, art displays, and open exhibitions. With a distinct focus on height and volume to support sculpture and multimedia pieces, the halls are made to support a variety of artistic formats and spatial arrangements.

=== Cinemas ===
The three cinemas at the National Theatre—two of equal size and one much larger—all have VIP viewing areas, which improve the complex's accessibility and usability. The cinemas were designed with acoustics in mind, with acoustic panels lining the walls, seating with wooden elements that reflect traditional Nigerian craftsmanship and provide tactile warmth, and rug-covered floors with alternating blue and red themes that effectively dampen sound. These materials ensure a blend of contemporary performance requirements with a contextual aesthetic rooted in heritage.

=== Changing rooms and ancillary support spaces ===
Facilities for performers include changing rooms, wardrobe storage, and restrooms, all tailored to support live performances and theatrical productions. These rooms are functional, designed with backstage circulation in mind to allow ease of movement and readiness.

=== Conservation laboratory and workshop ===
This is Nigeria's first conservation laboratory, emphasizing the preservation of cultural heritage. It holds artworks and historical materials from the 1977 festival and beyond. Objects such as instruments, photographs, doors, musical equipment, kitchenware, and various artworks are kept under controlled conditions using humidifiers and regulated temperatures. The adjacent workshop space is used for the repair and restoration of cultural artifacts, reflecting the theatre's role not only as a performance space but as a custodian of history.

=== VIP area ===
The VIP section of the National Theatre includes a VIP bar, seat-out spaces, and a lobby adorned with stained glass works by members of the Zaria Art Society (Zaria Rebels). It is accessed through Entrance C, which features a dedicated elevator to the main auditorium. Walls are lined with carved wooden panels illustrating Benin royal processions and festivals, contributing to a deeply symbolic visual environment. An imposing bronze relief panel approximately 8 meters in length dominates the VIP lounge. A presidential suite is also included, highlighted by a prominent coat of arms installation.

=== Main lobby ===
The main lobby serves as a dramatic transitional space, marked by 40 carved wooden panels, each reflecting distinct cultural themes. The area spans between 6 and 8 meters in height, enhancing its grandeur. A wide staircase leads to the main auditorium, and natural light filters through, contributing to a welcoming and ceremonial atmosphere.

=== Main auditorium ===
With a seating capacity of 5,000, the Main Auditorium is one of the largest in Africa. It features a VIP area, a proscenium stage, and three fiber friezes that depict traditional motifs. On both sides of the stage are large wooden artworks, and the stage curtain operates on an advanced open-close stage engineering system. The walls incorporate hidden lighting fixtures behind wooden panels to maintain an ambient brightness while highlighting material textures.

=== Roof garden ===
A distinctive architectural feature is the roof garden, designed as a public relaxation area. It includes stone paving, green landscaping, and wooden podiums, offering panoramic views of Lagos city. The integration of hard and soft landscape elements adds a biophilic character to the structure.

== Controversy ==
In 2005, President Olusegun Obasanjo announced plans to privatise the National Theatre. This sparked controversy amongst Nigerian entertainers and playwrights like Wole Soyinka. On 30 December 2014, it was reported that the National Theatre has been sold to a Dubai-based conglomerate for the sum of 31.5 billion naira, and that the building will be converted to a duty-free shopping centre.

== Appearance in media ==
- Filming for the "Keys to the Kingdom" video in Beyonce's visual album Black is King took place at the National Arts Theatre, Lagos.
- Burna Boy performed a medley of his hits "Level Up", "Onyeka" and "Ye" in front of and inside the building, during the Premiere ceremony of the 63rd Grammy Awards, on 2 March 2021. Later that week, his album Twice as Tall won the Grammy Award for Best Global Music Album.
