= Adendorff Trek =

The Adendorff Trek was a late 19th-century attempt by Afrikaners to establish a Boer Republic in Mashonaland, part of modern-day Zimbabwe. This initiative, which took place between 1890 and 1891, involved political manoeuvres, diplomatic interventions, and military engagements, illustrating the competing colonial interests of the British South Africa Company (BSACo), Afrikaners, and Portuguese forces during the period of the Scramble for Africa.

== Background ==
The trek was led by a group of Afrikaners who sought to cross the Limpopo River to create a Boer Republic in what would later become Southern Rhodesia. Publicity in the Transvaal Observer brought the matter to the attention of key figures such as Cecil Rhodes, Sir Henry Loch (the British High Commissioner at the Cape), and Paul Kruger (President of the South African Republic). At a meeting on 21 March 1890 at Blignault’s Point on the Vaal River, Kruger’s threats to confiscate the trekkers' land were sufficient to halt plans for the 1890 expedition.

== Renewed attempt in 1891 ==
On 24 June 1891, Col. Ignatius Ferreira led an armed group of Afrikaners to the Limpopo River with plans to invade Mashonaland and proclaim a Republic. This action prompted a response from the BSACo Police. The leaders were arrested, while Dr Jameson, representing BSACo, persuaded the remaining trekkers to disperse. Those willing to settle peacefully and obey local laws were later allowed to remain in Mashonaland.

== Portuguese threat in Manicaland ==
At the same time, BSACo faced challenges from Portuguese forces in Manicaland. On 15 November 1890, Portuguese officials Col. J.C. Paiva de Andrada and Gouveia coerced Chief Mutasa into revoking his concession with BSACo. BSACo forces, led by Capt. P.W. Forbes, arrested the Portuguese officials and dispersed their followers, an action that escalated tensions between Portugal and Britain.Mazarire 1992, p. 87. By early 1891, the Portuguese military advanced toward Macequece but suffered heavy losses due to disease and supply shortages.

== Military and diplomatic efforts ==
Lieut-Col Pennefather, commanding BSACo Police, and other officers were dispatched to counter both Boer and Portuguese threats. Fortifications were built along key points, including drifts on the Limpopo River and the strategic Naka Pass. Telegraph lines were extended to improve communication, and reinforcements were sent to secure vulnerable areas. Despite limited resources, BSACo’s strategy of diplomacy and military preparedness succeeded in averting direct conflict.

== Key incidents ==
1. Arrest of Boer Leaders: On 24 June 1891, Col. Ferreira and a small group of Boers crossed the Limpopo River into BSACo territory but were promptly arrested by Surgeon-Lieut E. Goody. The main Boer force remained on the southern bank, and Dr Jameson’s negotiations persuaded them to disband.
2. Defence of Manicaland: BSACo’s proactive measures, including constructing roads and defensive positions, thwarted Portuguese advances. Capt. H.M. Heyman’s force at Penhalonga played a key role in securing the region.

== Aftermath ==
The resolution of threats from both the Afrikaners and the Portuguese allowed BSACo to consolidate its control over Mashonaland. Many Afrikaner settlers integrated peacefully into the region. However, the company’s financial pressures led to the downsizing of its police force by late 1891. The Adendorff Trek highlighted the complex interplay of colonial interests and the challenges of maintaining territorial control during the era.

== Legacy ==
The Adendorff Trek and its related events underscore the geopolitical tensions in Southern Africa during the late 19th century. The attempted incursions from both Afrikaners and Portuguese forces illustrated the competing visions for territorial control and governance in the region. BSACo’s successful navigation of these challenges further solidified its influence over what would become Southern Rhodesia.
