= Dave Sunday (footballer) =

Zambian footballer (born 1947)

Personal information
- Full name: David Sande Chipandwe
- Date of birth: 9 April 1947 (age 79)
- Place of birth: Kitwe, Northern Rhodesia
- Position: Goalkeeper

Senior career*
Years	Team	Apps	(Gls)
1965	Rhokana United		
1966–1969	Kitwe United		
1970–1976	Nchanga Rangers		

International career
1969–1974	Zambia	3	(0)
- * Club domestic league appearances and goals

David Sande Chipandwe (born 9 April 1947), better known as Dave Sunday is former Zambian goalkeeper. Chipandwe played for Kitwe United and Nchanga Rangers and was part of the Zambian squad during the country's first ever Cup of Nations outing at Egypt 1974.

== Early life ==
Chipandwe was born in Kitwe to Sunday and Beauty Chipandwe and was the second born of six children. His father was a miner and later a banker. Despite growing up in Buchi township which was the stronghold of Kitwe United, he opted to join Rhokana United reserves while still a student at Luanshimba Secondary School.

== Playing career ==
At Rhokana, he found the team well stocked in the goalkeeping department so he was loaned to Kitwe United in 1966 where he established himself and played for four seasons. During his stint there, he enrolled for a mechanics course at Northern Technical College (NORTEC) in Ndola. This led to a scenario where he trained with Ndola side Strike Rovers during the week and played for Kitwe United at weekends. When he completed his course, he joined Nchanga Copper Mines as an intern and switched over to Nchanga Rangers in 1970.

At Rangers, his career blossomed and he became the team's first choice goalkeeper, winning three trophies: the Shell Challenge Cup in 1973 and 1976 as well as the Heroes & Unity Cup in 1975. As his adopted name sounded as if he was of European descent, Chipandwe was often mistaken for a white player by those who had never seen him in action.

== National team ==
Chipandwe's performances between the posts did not escape the attention of national team selectors. He first played for the Zambia Schools national team in the late ‘60s alongside the likes of Emmanuel Mwape, Moses Simwala, Stone Chibwe and Richard Stephenson among others.

He made his debut his international debut in 1969 and was in goal when Zambia suffered their worst defeat, a 10–1 massacre by Congo DR in Kinshasa though he was unwell on the day of the match and had to be substituted for Elias Mutau after conceding three goals. He was Zambia's third choice goalkeeper at CAN 1974 but did not see any action in Zambia's run to the final which they lost to Zaire after a replay.

Chipandwe made 6 appearances for Zambia, 3 of them against European club sides Leningrad Zeniths and Rostov on Don.

== Retirement ==
Chipandwe retired at the end of the 1976 season and a year after, was appointed to the Rangers executive. He was in charge of the technical committee and also trained goalkeepers John Kaunda and Ignatius Muswala. He left the executive in 1979 to concentrate on work in the mines.

He retired from the mines in May 2000 after 32 years service. He is currently working for Mining Haulage in Chingola as a mechanic.
