= John Sunday Jr. =

Florida politician

John Sunday Jr. (March 20, 1838 - January 7, 1925) was a carpenter, merchant, mechanic, cotton inspector, and state legislator in Florida. He served with fellow African American Charles Rouse representing Escambia County, Florida in 1874. He also served as a councilman in Pensacola.

He served in the 6th Regiment of the Corps d’Afrique in Port Hudson, Louisiana including at the Siege of Port Hudson. He is also documented with the 78th United States Colored Infantry Regiment from 1863 to 1865, achieving the rank of First Sergeant. After the war he worked at the U.S. Navy Yard in Pensacola. He was an organizer of the B. F. Stephenson Post of the Grand Army of the Republic and served as its commander for several years. His children included attendees of Fisk University and Meharry Medical College. The University of South Florida library has an engraving of him.

A society was established to save his home and continues to work to advocate for awareness of Pensacola's diverse history and to preserve its cultural resources.

In 2019, Pensacola's mayor declared March 20 John Sunday Day. John Sunday Jr. Plaza is named for him.

== See also ==
- African American officeholders from the end of the Civil War until before 1900
- List of United States Colored Troops Civil War units
