= Sunday Ododo =

Nigerian academic and administrator

Professor Sunday Ododo
- Born: Sunday Enessi Ododo; 21 October 1962 (age 63); Maiduguri, Borno State
- Occupation: Thespian

Academic background
- Education: University of Ilorin. B.A. Performing Arts, 1986; University of Ibadan, M.A. Theatre Arts (Arts of the Stage and Media), 1988; University of Ilorin, Ph.D. Performing Arts, 2004
- Alma mater: University of Ilorin
- Website: https://ododotech.com.ng

Sunday "Sunnie" Enessi Ododo, FNAL is a Nigerian professor of performance aesthetics, theatre practice and theatre technology. He is a writer and has served as the General Manager/CEO of the National Arts Theatre from 2020 to 2024. He is a Fellow of the Nigerian Academy of Letters and he is the current Vice President of the Academy (2025-2027).

== Early life and education ==
Ododo was born on 21 October 1962 in Maiduguri, Borno State. He hails from Okene in Kogi State. Ododo attended Nurul Islamic Primary School, Okene from 1970 to 1975. He then attended Fatima Community College, Ekan-Meje from 1975 to 1980. Ododo gained admission to the University of Ilorin in 1982 to study Performing Arts. He graduated with a Bachelor of Arts degree (2nd Class, Upper Division) in 1986. He furthered his education, earning a Master of Arts degree in Theatre Arts (Arts of the Stage and Media) in 1988 from the University of Ibadan. Ododo earned his PhD in Performing Arts from the University of Ilorin in 2004.

== Career ==
Ododo became a part-time tutorial assistant, General Studies Department, University of Ibadan in 1987. In 1989, he was Social Mobilisation Officer for Okene L.G.A Kwara/Kogi State Directorate for Social Mobilisation. He became a Principal Personnel Officer, Kogi State Government, Lokoja in 1992. He was employed as Assistant Lecturer, University of Ilorin in 1993. He rose through the ranks until becoming a Senior Lecturer in the same university in 2000. On 1 October 2008, Ododo was made a professor in the University of Maiduguri in 2008. A Festschrift was published on him and his works to mark his sixtieth birthday: One Tree a Forest: Studies in Nigerian Theatre Poetics, Technology and Cultural Aesthetics. Edited by Osakue S. Omoera, Bode Ojoniyi and Victor Ihidero.

== Administrative service ==
He served as head of department of Theatre Arts, University of Maiduguri from 2012 to 2015 and again from 2019. Ododo was appointed by President Muhammad Buhari as the General Manager/ CEO of National Arts Theatre in 2020. On Sunday, 3 September 2023, “The Road” a play by Wole Soyinka was staged at the National Arts Theatre in collaboration with an NGO, the African-Israeli Stage, during Ododo's tenure.

== Fellowship and membership ==
Ododo became a Fellow of Nigerian Academy of Letters in 2019; Fellow of the Society of Nigeria Theatre Artists (fsonta), 2013; Fellow of Theatre Arts (fta) awarded by Nigerian Association of Theatre Arts Practitioners (NANTAP), 2021; Fellow of the Society of Nigerian Artists (fsna) awarded by the Society of Nigerian Artists, 22 September 2021; Fellow of Association of Nigerian Author (fana) 6 November 2021; Fellow of Nigerian Institute of Public Relations (fnipr), 2022; Fellow of Africa Academic Network (faan),2023, and, Fellow, Council of Research Scholars and Administrators (fcrsa), 2023.

Ododo served as National Vice President, Association of Nigerian Authors (ANA) (2009 to 2011); National Vice President, Society of Nigeria Theatre Artists (SONTA) (2009 to 2013); and, National President, (SONTA) (2013 to 2017). He is member, National Association of Nigerian Theatre Arts Practitioners (NANTAP); Nigerian Institute of Public Relations (NIPR); Reading Association of Nigeria (RAN); American Studies Association of Nigeria (ASAN)l International Federation for Theatre Research (IFTR), London; International Organization of Scenographers, Technicians, and Architects of Theatre (OISTAT), Nigeria Folklore Society; and, Union of African Performing Artists.

== Research contributions ==
Based on his observations of the dramatic performances of the Ebira people, Ododo developed a theory called "Facekuerade". In his research on the Ebira-Ekuechi festival, which is reported in an article he entitled, "Facekuerade: The transformational duality in Ebira-Ekuechi festival performance”, he identified "Facekuerade" as a way to classify unmasked masquerade characters. This theory focuses on the transformational duality in Ebira mask practices, specifically during the Ekuechi festival. Through field work and interviews, Ododo explored the double essence of maskless characters portrayed as masquerades. The concept of Facekuerade is derived from Ebira beliefs about the realm of the dead and masquerades, as well as the general understanding of masquerade motifs in Nigerian and African cultures. This notion distinguishes between masked and unmasked characters within masquerade performances. To Ododo, Facekuerade could be considered as a form of theater due to its performative and ritualistic nature.

== Editorship of journals ==
Ododo is the pioneer Editor of Scene Dock: Journal of Theatre Design and Technology; editor of Alore: Ilorin Journal of the Humanities; The Performer: Ilorin Journal of the Performing Arts; Sino-US English Teaching Journal; Liwuram Journal of the Humanities, and, US-China Foreign Language Journal. He is the pioneer editor-in-chief of the National Theatre Monograph Series (NATMOS).

== Recognitions ==
Ododo is a recipient of the Time Africa’s Who’s Who Africa Award for Exceptional Leadership, Integrity, and Relentless Commitment to public Service in Africa, 2023-2024; his play, Hard Choice, won the Association of Nigerian Authors (ANA) Drama Prize, 2012.

== Television drama ==
The Revelation by Sunnie Ododo (1987); Political Reveries by Sunnie Ododo (1987); and, African Man by Sunnie Ododo (1987) were all screened by Nigerian Television Authority, Yola.

== Works ==
- The Revelation (1987, television drama)
- To Return from the Void (opera; performed in 1998, 2001, 2002 and 2006)
- Vanishing Vapour (2006, dance libretto)
- Hard Choice (2008, drama)
- Illusive Force (1984, a play).
- White and Black Battle (1985, a play).
- Sweet Exposure (1985, a play).
- Too Late, the Harm is Done (1986, a short story).
- Political Reveries (1987, Television drama).
- African Man (1987, Television drama).

== Select academic publications ==
- Ododo, S. E. (2014). “It's only bent, not broken : culture, education, politics and performance art in Ebira and Ogori”, Maiduguri, Nigeria : Society of Nigeria Theatre Artists (SONTA).
- Ododo, S. E. and Osakue S.O. (2017) Theatre, media, and cultural re-engineering in Nigeria : an ovation of excellence to Barclays Foubiri Ayakoroma (BFA). Ibadan : Kraft Books Limited.
- Ododo, S. E. (2008). "Facekuerade: The transformational duality in Ebira-Ekuechi festival performance”, Cultural Studies. 22 (2): 284–308.
- Ododo, S. E. and Akoh, A.D. (2016). “ Performative kinesis: theatre, media and national security Responsibility”, Maiduguri, Nigeria: Society of Nigeria Theatre Artists (SONTA).
- Ododo, Sunday E. and Musiliyu Olorunnishola Sanni. (2021). “Scenographic Conception and Dramatic Action in Olu Obafemi’s Plays” in Larger than His Frame II: Further Critical Studies and Reflections on Olu Obafemi. Oni, Duro and Sunday Enessi Ododo (eds.) pp. 426–432. (Lagos: National Theatre, Nigeria).
- Ododo, Sunday E. 2023. “Technology and the Future of Film Distribution” in Regulating Nollywood in a Ritual Cultural Space. Rasheedah Liman and Victor S. Dugga (eds.) pp. 113–130. Abuja: National Film and Video Censors Board.
- Ododo, S.E. and Patricia Oguntoye. 2023. “Managing Reality Television Show in Nigeria: A Case Study of “The Next Movie Star” in Critical Nationalism: Orature, Literature and Language- A book in Honour of Idris OO Amali. Adam Al-Amin et al. (eds.) pp. 391– 402. Lafia: Federal University Lafia Printing Press.
- Ododo, S.E. 2024. “Spatial Temporality and the Poetics of Space Liminality in Ebiran Ekuechi Facekuerade Performance” in Kene Igweonu (ed.) Routledge Handbook of African Theatre and Performance, pp. 136– 144. (London: Routledge Taylor and Francis Group).
