= Sunday Kayuni =

Tanzanian football manager (born 1987)

Personal information
- Place of birth: Tanzania

Managerial career
- Years: Team
- 1993–1995: Tanzania
- 1995–1997: Yanga
- 1998: AFC Leopards

Sunday Kayuni is a Tanzanian former football manager.

== Career ==
Kayuni obtained a CAF A License. In 1993, he was appointed manager of the Tanzania national football team. Two years later, he was appointed manager of Tanzanian side Yanga, helping the club win two league titles. Subsequently, he was appointed manager of Kenyan side AFC Leopards, helping the club win a league title.

Following his stint there, he worked as an advisor for CECAFA for the 2019 Kagame Interclub Cup. Besides that, he also worked as a coaching instructor. During the summer of 2020, he published a book entitled Football Coach.
