= British South Africa Company =

British colonial company, 1889–1965

- Company coat of arms

- Flag
- Type: Public company
- Industry: Mining, colonial enterprises
- Predecessor: Central Search Association and the Exploring Company Ltd
- Founded: London, United Kingdom (1889)
- Founder: Cecil Rhodes
- Defunct: 1965
- Fate: Acquired by Charter International (1965); Dormant company (present)
- Successor: Charter Consolidated Ltd
- Headquarters: London, United Kingdom
- Area served: Southern Africa; South Africa; Botswana; Rhodesia; Zambia and their predecessor entities
- Key people: Kevin Johnson, Director
- Parent: Charterland and General Exploration and Finance

The British South Africa Company (BSAC or BSACo) was chartered in 1889 following the amalgamation of Cecil Rhodes' Central Search Association and the London-based Exploring Company Ltd, which had originally competed to capitalise on the expected mineral wealth of Mashonaland but united because of common economic interests and to secure British government backing. The company received a Royal Charter modelled on that of the British East India Company. Its first directors included the 2nd Duke of Abercorn, Rhodes himself, and the South African financier Alfred Beit. Rhodes hoped BSAC would promote colonisation and economic exploitation across much of south-central Africa, as part of the "Scramble for Africa". However, his main focus was south of the Zambezi, in Mashonaland and the coastal areas to its east, from which he believed the Portuguese could be removed by payment or force, and in the Transvaal, which he hoped would return to British control.

It has been suggested that Rhodes' ambition was to create a zone of British commercial and political influence from "Cape to Cairo", but this was far beyond the resources of any commercial company to achieve and would not have given investors the financial returns they expected. The BSAC was created in the expectation that the gold fields of Mashonaland would provide funds for the development of other areas of Central Africa, including the mineral wealth of Katanga. When the expected wealth of Mashonaland did not materialise and Katanga was acquired by the Congo Free State, the company had little money left for significant development after building railways, particularly in areas north of the Zambezi. BSAC regarded its lands north of the Zambezi as territory to be held as cheaply as possible for future, rather than immediate, exploitation.

As part of administering Southern Rhodesia until 1923 and Northern Rhodesia until 1924, the BSAC formed what were originally paramilitary forces, but which later included more normal police functions. In addition to the administration of Southern and Northern Rhodesia, the BSAC claimed extensive landholdings and mineral rights in both the Rhodesias and, although its land claims in Southern Rhodesia were nullified in 1918, its land rights in Northern Rhodesia and its mineral rights in Southern Rhodesia had to be bought out in 1924 and 1933 respectively, and its mineral rights in Northern Rhodesia lasted until 1964. The BSAC also created the Rhodesian railway system and owned the railways there until 1947.

== Corporate history ==
=== Royal charter ===
The Royal Charter of the British South Africa Company (BSAC) came into effect on 20 December 1889. This was initially for a period of 25 years, later extended for a further 10 years, thus it expired in 1924.

The company had been incorporated in October 1888, and much of the time after Rhodes arrived in London in March 1889 (and before its Charter was granted) was taken up in discussions on its terms. In these discussions, Rhodes led the BSAC negotiators. Although the British government broadly supported the scheme, it demanded that it and the High Commissioner for Southern Africa it appointed should have the ultimate responsibility for any territory BSAC might acquire and for approving or rejecting all BSAC actions. Although Clause 3 of the Charter appeared to grant BSAC powers to administer a wide (if unspecified) area of Central Africa on behalf of the British government, this was subject to it obtaining those powers through treaties with local rulers. Under Clauses 4 and 9, the British government also had to accept those treaties and agree to assume any powers to govern that the rulers had granted before authorising BSAC to exercise those powers in its behalf.

=== Board divisions ===
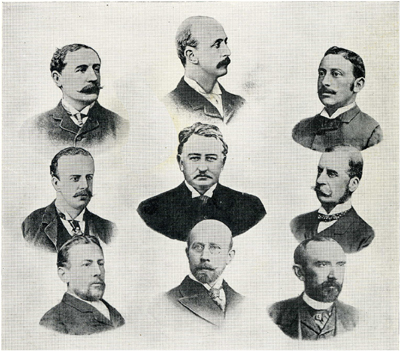
The first board of directors of the British South Africa Company, 1889. Top row: Horace Farquhar; Albert Grey; Alfred Beit. Middle row: the Duke of Fife; C. J. Rhodes (founder and managing director in South Africa); the Duke of Abercorn. Bottom row: Lord Gifford, V.C.; Herbert Canning (Secretary); George Cawston.

The BSAC was an amalgamation of a London-based group headed by Lord Gifford and George Cawston and backed financially by Baron Nathan de Rothschild, and Rhodes and his South African associates including Alfred Beit with the resources of the De Beers Syndicate and Gold Fields of South Africa. These two groups had originally been in competition but united because of common economic interests. Gifford and Cawston's interests were represented by the Bechuanaland Exploration Company and its offshoot, the Exploring Company. Rhodes and his associates secured the Rudd Concession from the Ndebele king, Lobengula, which was transferred to the Central Search Association (later renamed United Concession Company), and the Exploring Company was given approximately one-quarter of the shares in it. The British South Africa Company leased mineral rights from the Central Search Association, paying it half the net profits from mineral exploitation.

From the start, Gifford disliked Rhodes, who he thought had acquired too much power in BSAC and had marginalised him. Cawston supported Rhodes only in those commercial activities likely to make a profit and not in any less commercial ventures. The four other directors were appointed to represent the other shareholders. The dukes of Abercorn and Fife, respectively chairman and vice-chairman were appointed to give the company prestige but they took little part in running the company. Neither had previous interest in Africa, and Fife had no business experience. Albert Grey, later Earl Grey, had an active role as a liaison between Rhodes in South Africa and government officials in London. He and Horace Farquhar, a prominent London banker, completed the first Board.

=== The Jameson Raid and after ===
Sir Henry Loch, the High Commissioner for Southern Africa, had planned the overthrow of the Transvaal Government in the event of an uprising in Johannesburg by British subjects denied civil and political rights as early as 1893, and the Colonial Secretary, Lord Ripon, did nothing to discourage this. Loch's successor as High Commissioner from 1895, Sir Hercules Robinson inherited these plans, but neither Loch, Robinson or Ripon took any steps to promote such an uprising. Joseph Chamberlain, who succeeded Ripon in 1895, was almost certainly aware that Rhodes was planning an uprising, but not the details. Rhodes and Jameson made plans to assist, and probably to promote, a Johannesburg uprising. Earl Grey was the only London-based director to know about plans for the Jameson Raid, and he, like Rhodes and Beit, did not share this knowledge with the other BSAC directors. Grey communicated at least some of the plan to Joseph Chamberlain, who avoided specifically endorsing it.

News of the Raid shocked the BSAC directors who, except for Beit and Grey, knew nothing of the plan. Rhodes at first denied responsibility for Jameson's actions but, in the face of further revelations, he assumed full responsibility for them. The BSAC Board recognised that the company would be attacked, and asked Rhodes to come to London to meet them. At a Board meeting of 5 February 1896, Rhodes claimed that he had given Jameson permission to support an uprising only, not to start one, and that he believed had the support of the British government. He offered to resign as managing director, but a decision on this was deferred despite the demands of Cawston and Gifford for its acceptance. However, after the trial of the Jameson raiders implicated Rhodes further and following pressure from Chamberlain, Rhodes and Beit were removed as directors in June 1896.

After his removal, Rhodes remained a major shareholder in the BSAC and he continued to be involved unofficially in its affairs. In 1898, the Duke of Fife and Lord Farquhar both resigned from the Board; Rhodes and Beit replaced them and another supporter of Rhodes also joined the Board. As Rhodes had recaptured full control over the company, Cawston decided to resign. Lord Gifford, however, remained on the Board, which Rhodes dominated until his death.

=== After Rhodes ===
Rhodes retained effective control of the BSAC until his death in 1902, but after the Jameson Raid the company's relations with the Colonial Office over Rhodesia were difficult, as the Colonial Office was unwilling to recognise the company had to give priority to its commercial interests rather than administration. After Rhodes' death, the BSAC directors attempted to make the company commercially profitable, but until 1924 it was deeply unprofitable because its administrative costs outweighed its commercial income, and it never paid a dividend in that period. After a financial crisis in Britain in 1908, the value of its shares declined sharply: its share capital had to be increased from £6 million to £12 million between 1908 and 1912, and it needed large loans to stay in business. As the accumulated deficits increased, the value of the shares continued to decline until the 1920s.

From around 1920, the company favoured a union of Southern and Northern Rhodesia, followed by their inclusion in the Union of South Africa, and it was in discussion with South African leaders about this. South Africa offered favourable terms for buying out the BSAC's interests, and the company would be relieved of any future administrative costs. The BSAC did not want to be left with responsibility for the administration of Northern Rhodesia when Southern Rhodesia gained responsible government, but did want to preserve its commercial interests there, in particular its mining and land rights. To do this, it had to negotiate a settlement with the British government for both parts of Rhodesia. The two parties began negotiations in an atmosphere of mutual suspicion at the end of 1922, but nevertheless reached an agreement of 29 September 1923 to settle all the outstanding questions on Southern and Northern Rhodesia.

From 1925 until his death in 1937 Sir Henry Birchenough, a former director of the company, served as president.

After 1924 the BSAC's rights allowed it to collect vast sums in royalties, particularly from the development of the Northern Rhodesian Copperbelt, from the late 1920s until its mineral rights were liquidated just before Zambian independence in 1964. In the 1930s, the BSAC was able to collect royalties on all copper mined and was a large shareholder in the main mining companies. Until decolonization, the company therefore became a very lucrative investment opportunity, yielding very high return to investors.

== Territorial acquisitions ==
=== Rhodesia ===
The first stage in acquiring territory was to enter into “treaties” with local rulers. Although the Ndebele king, Lobengula, had agreed not to enter into a treaty with any other power without prior British consent, and had granted mining concessions to the BSAC (including the right for the company to protect them), he consistently refused to delegate any general powers of government to the British South Africa Company. When the BSAC was unable to get Lobengula to sign the treaties on the agreed terms, they lied. However, the BSAC convinced the Colonial Office that it should declare a protectorate on the basis that a group of citizens of the Transvaal Republic led by Louis Adendorff planned to cross the Limpopo River to settle and proclaim a republic in Mashonaland. A protectorate was proclaimed by an Order-in-Council of 9 May 1891, initially covering Mashonaland and later Matabeleland. This was an attempt to circumnavigate the Ndebele states and take the mashonaland without ever negotiating with any Shona kingdom. The Adendorff party did attempt to cross the Limpopo in June 1891, but was turned back by a force of the BSAC police.

The Lozi of the Barotseland formed a kingdom whose king, Lewanika had begun his rule in 1876, but had been driven from power in 1884. After his return in 1885, his concerns about further internal power struggles and the threat of Ndebele raids prompted him to seek European protection. He asked François Coillard of the Paris Evangelical Missionary Society, which had set up a mission to the Lozi, to help him draft a petition seeking a British protectorate. This reached the Colonial Office in August 1889, but no immediate action was taken to accept it. Even before this, Cecil Rhodes, while attempting to obtain a Royal Charter for the BSAC, considered Barotseland as a suitable area for company operations and as a gateway to the copper deposits of Katanga. Rhodes sent Frank Lochner to Barotseland to obtain a concession and made an offer to the British government to pay the expenses of a Barotseland protectorate. Lochner sponsored the misconception that BSAC represented the British government, and on 27 June 1890, Lewanika gave his consent to an exclusive mineral concession. This (the Lochner Concession) gave the company mining rights over the whole of the area in which Lewanika was paramount ruler in exchange for an annual subsidy and the promise of British protection, a promise that Lochner had no authority to give. However, the BSAC advised the Foreign Office that the Lozi had accepted British protection.

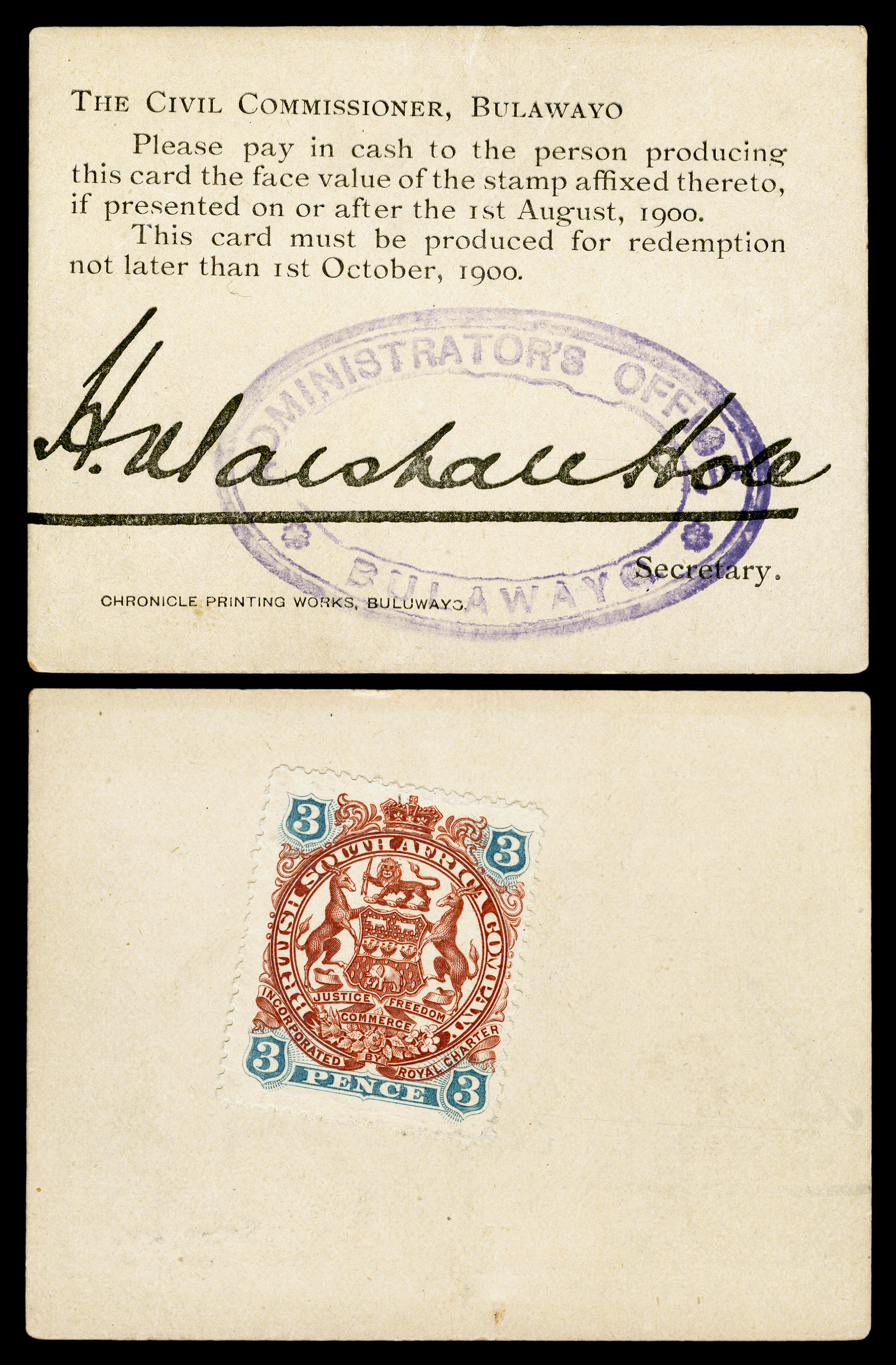
British South Africa Company stamp used to validate emergency issue currency for use in Bulawayo, authorized by Hugh Marshall Hole.

The Foreign Office had reservations over the nature and extent of the supposed protectorate and it never sanctioned the Lochner Concession, because it did not grant BSAC any administrative rights and it involved monopolies, prohibited in the BSAC Charter. However, in negotiations with the Portuguese government, Barotseland was claimed to fall within the British sphere of influence and the Anglo-Portuguese Treaty of 1891 allocated the Barotse Kingdom's territory to the British sphere, although the boundary with Angola was not fixed until 1905. Lewanika protested that the terms of the treaty had been misrepresented to him. No BSAC Administrator was sent to Barotseland until 1895, and the first Administrator, Forbes who remained until 1897, did little to establish an administration. As the Foreign Office was not convinced that the Lochner Concession had established a British protectorate over Barotseland or given BSAC any rights to administer the territory, it considered that a new concession was necessary. It agreed in 1896 that a BSAC official would be appointed as Resident Commissioner to secure this concession. The first appointee died before taking up his post, but in October 1897, Robert Coryndon reached Barotseland as Resident Commissioner. Coryndon, a former secretary of Cecil Rhodes and member of the Pioneer Column, had been proposed by the BSAC, and his appointment was approved by the High Commissioner for South Africa as representing the British government. In his capacity as Resident, Coryndon declared Barotseland to be a British protectorate, resolving its previously anomalous position. Coryndon also confirmed that the 1890 mineral concession gave the BSAC no right to make land grants. In 1897 Lewanika signed a new concession (the Coryndon Concession) that gave the BSAC the rights to make land grants and to establish jurisdiction in parallel to the king's courts. Next, in 1900, Lewanika signed a further agreement, (the Barotse Concession), which resolved some details that were in dispute following the earlier concessions and was drafted in terms compatible with the Barotseland-North Western Rhodesia Order in Council, 1899. .

Up to 1899, Northern Rhodesia outside of Barotseland was governed according to the Order-in-Council of 9 May 1891, which did not fix clear boundaries to the area involved. Before 1911, Northern Rhodesia was administered as two separate territories, North-Western Rhodesia and North-Eastern Rhodesia. The former was recognised as British territory by the Barotseland and North-Western Rhodesia Order-in-Council of 1899 and the later by the North-Eastern Rhodesia Order-in-Council of 1900. Both Orders-in-Council regularised the position of the BSAC Administrators, the first of whom for North- Eastern Rhodesia was appointed in 1895. In North-Western Rhodesia the first Administrator was appointed for Barotseland in 1897, becoming Administrator for all North-Western Rhodesia in 1900.

=== Other areas ===
In 1890, Alfred Sharpe undertook an expedition with the objective of acquiring Katanga. He only managed to make treaties with local rulers in North-Eastern Rhodesia, a number of whom later claimed that the contents of the treaty documents had been misrepresented to them. Katanga became part of the Congo Free State. The boundary between the Congo Free State and British territory was fixed by a treaty in 1894. It was only after this treaty and the appointment of a separate Administrator for North- Eastern Rhodesia in 1895 that the area was brought under effective BSAC control.

The British South Africa Company also considered acquiring interests in Bechuanaland Protectorate and Nyasaland, which was initially called the British Central Africa Protectorate. During negotiations for its charter in 1889, the company discussed the possibilities of taking over the administration of Bechuanaland, which was already a British protectorate, and of working with, and possibly amalgamating with, the African Lakes Company which was operating in Nyasaland. On 29 October 1889, a Royal Charter authorised the formation of the British South Africa Company's Police. In the event, BSAC did not take over the administration of Bechuanaland, but from 1892 it took over the cost of the Bechuanaland Border Police, which from 1896 was merged with the British South Africa Police. On 1 Apr 1896 the Bechuanaland Border Police was renamed as the Bechuanaland Mounted Police (BMP).

The African Lakes Company was itself attempting to become a Chartered Company in the late 1880s, and Rhodes discussed its possible amalgamation with the BSAC in 1889. However, the Foreign Office judged the African Lakes Company as unsuitable to administer any territory, and by 1890 BSAC wished to take control of that company rather than amalgamate with it. The Lakes Company directors resisted, but by 1893 they had been ousted. In 1891, the British Central Africa Protectorate was proclaimed on the understanding that the BSAC would contribute to the costs of its administration. However, its Commissioner, Harry Johnson, refused to act as a BSAC appointee, in particular on Rhodes' demand that all Crown lands in the protectorate should be transferred to BSAC control and that Johnson should also facilitate the transfer of African lands to it

=== Dispute with Portugal ===
At the start of the 19th century, effective Portuguese government in Mozambique was limited to the ports of Mozambique Island, Ibo, Quelimane, Sofala, Inhambane and Lourenço Marques and the outposts at Sena and Tete in the Zambezi valley. Although Portugal claimed sovereignty over Angoche and a number of smaller Muslim coastal towns, these were virtually independent. In the Zambezi valley, Portugal had also initiated the Prazo system of large leased estates under nominal Portuguese rule. By the end of the 18th century, this area in the valleys of the Zambezi and lower Shire River were controlled by a few families that claimed to be Portuguese subjects but which were virtually independent. In the interior of what is today southern and central Mozambique, there was not even a pretence of Portuguese control. The nadir of Portuguese fortunes was reached in the 1830s and 1840s with the Zulus' mfecane sacking of Lourenço Marques in 1833 and Sofala in 1835; Zumbo was abandoned in 1836; Afro-Portuguese settlers near Vila de Sena were forced to pay tribute to the Gaza Empire and Angoche fought off a Portuguese attempt to prevent it from slave-trading in 1847. However, around 1840 the Portuguese government embarked on a series of military campaigns to bring the prazos and the Muslim coastal towns under its effective control.

The General Act of the Berlin Conference dated 26 February 1885, which introduced the principle of effective occupation was potentially damaging to Portuguese claims in Mozambique. Article 34 required a power acquiring land on the coasts of Africa outside of its previous possessions to notify the other signatories of the Act so they could protest against such claims. Article 35 of the Act provided that rights could only be acquired over previously uncolonised lands if the power claiming them had established sufficient authority there to protect existing rights and the freedom of trade. This normally implied making treaties with local rulers, establishing an administration and exercising police powers. Initially, Portugal claimed that the Berlin Treaty did not apply, and it was not required to issue notifications or establish effective occupation, as Portugal's claim to the Mozambique coast had existed for centuries and had been unchallenged.

However, British officials did not accept this interpretation, as Henry O'Neill, the British consul based at Mozambique Island said in January 1884:

"There is a field of action open to [Britain] in South Africa which only a slight political barrier interposes to shut her out from. We refer, of course, to the area of Portuguese rule. This, it is true, at present is an undefinable area. Portugal has been a colonising power only in name. To speak of Portuguese colonies in East Africa is to speak of a mere fiction—a fiction colourably sustained by a few scattered seaboard settlements, beyond whose narrow littoral and local limits colonisation and government have no existence."

To forestall British designs on the parts of Mozambique and the interior that O'Neill claimed Portugal did not occupy, Joaquim Carlos Paiva de Andrada was commissioned in 1884 to establish effective occupation, and he was active in four areas. Firstly, in 1884 he established the town of Beira and Portuguese occupation of much of Sofala Province. Secondly, also in 1884, he acquired a concession of an area within a 180 kilometre radius of Zumbo, which had been reoccupied and west of which Afro-Portuguese families had traded and settled since the 1860s. Although Andrada did not establish any administration immediately, in 1889 an outpost was established beyond the junction of the Zambezi and Kafue River and an administrative district of Zumbo was established. Thirdly, in 1889 Andrada was granted another concession over Manica, which covered the areas both of the Manica Province of Mozambique and the Manicaland Province of Zimbabwe. Andrada succeeded in obtaining treaties over much of this area and establishing a rudimentary administration but he was arrested in November 1890 by British South Africa Company troops and expelled. Finally, also in 1889, Andrada crossed northern Mashonaland, approximately the area of the Mashonaland Central Province of Zimbabwe, obtaining treaties. He failed to inform the Portuguese government of these treaties, so these claims were not formally notified to other powers, as required by the Berlin Treaty. The British government refused to submit any disputed claims to arbitration, and on 11 January 1890, Lord Salisbury sent the British Ultimatum of 1890 to the Portuguese government demanded the withdrawal of the Portuguese troops from the areas where Portuguese and British interests in Africa overlapped.

=== Fixing boundaries ===
The final stage in acquiring territory was to make bi-lateral treaties with other European powers. The Anglo-Portuguese Treaty of 1891 was an agreement signed in Lisbon on 11 June 1891 between the United Kingdom and Portugal. It fixed the boundaries between the territories administered by the British South Africa Company in Mashonaland and Matabeleland, now parts of Zimbabwe, and North-Eastern Rhodesia (now part of Zambia) and Portuguese Mozambique. It divided Manica, granting the western portion to the British South Africa Company. It also fixed the boundaries between the BSAC-administered territory of North-Western Rhodesia (now in Zambia), and Portuguese Angola. The northern border of the British territories was agreed as part of an Anglo-German Convention in 1890. The border between the British Central Africa Protectorate and the territory of the British South Africa Company in what is today Zambia was fixed in 1891 at the drainage divide between Lake Malawi and the Luangwa River.

=== Early administration ===
The terms of the treaties under which the various protectorates were created north or south of the Zambezi provided for the rulers that signed them to retain significant powers over their own people. Despite this, the British South Africa Company either ended the powers of traditional rulers through warfare or eroded them by encouraging its own officials to take most of them over. By the end of the first decade of the 20th century, those traditional rulers that remained were restricted to largely ceremonial roles only.

The BSAC appointed an Administrator of Mashonaland, who was intended to have a similar function to a colonial governor, and later assistants in charge of districts. The first Administrator, A. R. Colquhoun, was appointed in October 1890, soon after the Pioneer Column had arrived at Fort Salisbury. As first, the British government refused to recognise Colquhoun, and placed the governor of Bechuanaland in immediate charge of the new protectorate, with the High Commissioner for South Africa given oversight of it. The governor legitimated the Administrator in July 1891 by appointing him Chief Magistrate, and as the British government did not want the expense of administration, it acquiesced to BSAC control. The Administrator, as Chief Magistrate, appointed assistants charged with keeping order in the various parts of Mashonaland, and from these a district administration developed. However, under Colquhoun and his successor from August 1891, Leander Starr Jameson, there were less than 20 administrative staff, mostly inexperienced, so government was minimal. As the High Commissioner was usually resident in Cape Town, a Resident Commissioner was appointed to represent him in Rhodesia. The early BSAC Administrators had a dual role, being appointed Administrators by the company and Chief Magistrate by the Crown. Their position was regularised in 1894, when the British government appointed the British South Africa Company to administer what was beginning to be called Rhodesia, which at that time was not split into Northern and Southern sections. A Legislative Council was created in 1898 in Southern Rhodesia to advise the BSAC Administrator and the High Commissioner for South Africa in legal matters.

Administration north of the Zambezi was rudimentary before 1901. In North-Eastern Rhodesia, Abercorn and Fife were fortified outposts and the Administrator of North-Eastern Rhodesia was resident in Blantyre in the British Central Africa Protectorate until Fort Jameson was founded in 1899 as its headquarters. In Barotziland-North-Western Rhodesia, there was no Secretariat until 1901.

== Land policies ==
=== Southern Rhodesia ===
After the entry of the Pioneer Column into Southern Rhodesia, the provision of land for European settlers was one of the first matters to be taken up by the British South Africa Company. Matabele authority ceased, freehold ownership of land was introduced, and large tracts were acquired by the BSAC for alienation to Europeans. Jameson, who became Administrator of Mashonaland in 1891, was Rhodes' appointee and he executed what he thought were Rhodes' plans with little supervision from Rhodes and none from the BSAC Board in London. Jameson made very large land grants between 1891 and 1893 for little return until the directors' complaints stopped him (although Rhodes' approved several other large grants up to 1896). This policy discouraged later settlers, who could only acquire good quality land at a high price from these grantees.

As English law applied in both in Southern Rhodesia and Northern Rhodesia, all land that had not already been alienated should in principle have been Crown land. However, in both territories, BSAC claimed ownership of the land not in other private ownership either because it, not the Crown, had conquered it or under the various concessions it had obtained. It also claimed the right to alienate this land as its owner. In 1890 and 1891, the Colonial Office and the High Commissioner accepted that BSAC had obtained title to the land in Mashonaland. After the Matebele wars, the company also claimed in 1894 to have the right to dispose of all land in Matebeleland, on the basis that the Ndebele king, Lobengula had owned it, but had forfeited it. The Colonial Office objected, but only to the extent of requiring BSAC to reserve sufficient lands for the African population.

In 1894, a Land Commission was appointed to deal with the settlement of Africans on the land. The Commission recommended that two large territories be set aside for native occupation, the Shangani and Gwaai Reserves in Matabeleland, of about 2,486,000 acres. Before the arrival of the Europeans, Africans had held nearly 100,000,000 acres in what became Southern Rhodesia. The Land Commission's plan showed such poor judgment, and the bases of allocation were so ill-considered, that the attempt to confine the native population within these two areas was never really practicable. Failure to make suitable provision for African lands may have been one of the prime causes of the Matabele and Mashona rebellions of 1896. Following these rebellions, BSAC was required to assign sufficient land to Southern Rhodesian Africans for their agricultural and pastoral requirements, including access to sufficient water. Native Reserves were set up under this directive, which by 1902 had an estimated indigenous population of 530,000. Although later modifications were made, the basic pattern of land allocation persisted until independence. The European district officers who responsible for defining the reserves were advised to allow between 9 and 15 acres of arable land for each family, and adequate pasture, but they had little geographic knowledge of the country and no maps. In 1910, a Native Affairs Committee of Enquiry was set up, which made very few changes. The committee's land apportionment was 19 million acres for Europeans and 21.4 million acres for Native Reserves with an African population of about 700,000. A further 51.6 million acres was unassigned, but available for future alienation to Europeans.

In 1918, the Judicial Committee of the Privy Council decided in the Southern Rhodesia case that, even although the British South Africa Company may have conquered Mashonaland and Matabeleland, it had acted as an agent of the British Crown, so the land had become Crown land. The court recognised that the indigenous people of what became Southern Rhodesia, had previously owned the land, but had lost it through the BSAC conquest. However, even after the Privy Council decision, the British government allowed BSAC to continue to administer the unalienated lands in Southern Rhodesia and agreed that, when their Charter expired, it was to recover the loss it had incurred in administering the territory either from future sales of these lands or from the British government. In negotiations for the ending of the Charter in 1923, the British government agreed to fund part of this deficit, but placed the obligation to pay off the rest on Southern Rhodesia itself.

In 1920, some smaller reserves were reorganised, and 83 Native Reserves of 21.6 million acres were recognised, which were for the exclusive use and occupation almost 900,000 Africans. Of this total, about 3 million acres were unsuitable for any agricultural use. A review after the end of BSAC administration in 1925 enforced stricter segregation of European and African land, while allowing only a little more land for African use.

=== Northern Rhodesia ===
In Northern Rhodesia, the BSAC claimed ownership of all the unalienated land in the territory, and the right to alienate it. Europeans occupied land along the line of the railway and near the towns, but generally there was no land shortage, as the population density was lower than in Southern Rhodesia, and the European population was much lower. In 1913, BSAC drew up plans for Native Reserves along Southern Rhodesian lines, outside which Africans would have no right to own or occupy land, but these plans were not implemented until 1928, after company administration ended.

The Privy Council decision on Southern Rhodesia raised questions about the BSAC claim to the unalienated lands north of the Zambezi. However, the company's claim in Northern Rhodesia was based on concessions granted rather than conquest and, although a parliamentary Committee in 1921 recommended that these claims also should be referred to the Privy Council, the British government preferred to negotiate an overall settlement for the end of BSAC administration in Northern Rhodesia. This effectively acknowledged the company's claim. Under an Agreement of 29 September 1923, the Northern Rhodesian government took over the entire control of lands previously controlled by BSAC from 1 April 1924, paying the company half the net rents and the proceeds of certain land sales.

== Railways ==
=== Railway policies ===
The British South Africa Company was responsible for building the Rhodesian railway system in the period of primary construction which ended in 1911, when the main line through Northern Rhodesia reached the Congo border and the Katanga copper mines. Rhodes' original intention was for a railway extending across the Zambesi to Lake Tanganyika, popularly considered as part of a great "Cape to Cairo" railway linking all the British colonies of Africa. Rhodes was as much a capitalist in his motivation as a visionary, and when little gold was found in Mashonaland, he accepted that even the scheme to reach Lake Tanganyika had no economic justification. Railways built by private companies without government subsidies need enough of the type of traffic that can pay high freight rates to recover their construction costs. The agricultural products that fueled much of Rhodesia's early economic growth could not provide this traffic; large quantities of minerals could. Most early railways in Africa were built by the British government rather than Chartered Companies. The need to raise capital and produce dividends prevented most Chartered Companies from undertaking such infrastructure investments. However, in the early period of railway construction, the BSAC obtained finance from South African companies including Consolidated Gold Fields and De Beers in which Rhodes was a dominant force. BSAC also benefitted from the large, but not unlimited personal fortunes of Rhodes and Beit before their deaths.

=== Development of routes ===
Lord Gifford and his Bechuanaland Exploring Company had won the right to construct a private railway north from the terminus of the Cape Government Railways at Kimberley into Bechuanaland in 1888. Rhodes was initially against this extension, in part because Gifford was a competitor but also for reasons of Cape politics. However, when Rhodes and Gifford joined forces, BSAC had to take on this railway obligation to gain its Charter. Rhodes promised that BSAC would spend £500,000 on building a railway through Bechuanaland, half of BSAC's total initial share capital. The railway reached Vryburg in 1890, stopping there until 1893 because of the poor financial state of BSAC and disappointing reports about gold in Mashonaland and Matabeleland. BSAC remained cautious about railway building until 1896, when African uprisings threatening its investment made railway links to Southern Rhodesia imperative.

The line from Kimberley reached Bulawayo in 1897, and a connection to Salisbury was completed in 1902. By then Southern Rhodesia already had a rail outlet to the Mozambican port of Beira. This was completed by the Beira Railway Company, a subsidiary company of the BSAC, as a narrow gauge railway as far as Umtali in 1898. In the next year, a line from Salisbury to Umtali was completed which, like the Kimberley to Bulawayo line, was at the Cape gauge of 3 feet 6 inches. The Umtali to Beira section was widened to Cape gauge in 1899 and 1900. These lines were proposed before the economic potential of the Rhodesias was fully known, and in the hope that the expected gold discoveries would promote economic development. Rhodesia's gold deposits proved disappointing, and it was the coal of Wankie that first provided the traffic and revenue to fund railway construction to the north. After the discovery of its huge coal reserves, a branch to Wankie from the main line from Bulawayo (which had been extended to cross the Victoria Falls in 1902) was completed in 1903.

The next section was to Broken Hill (now Kabwe), which the railway reached in 1906. BSAC was assured that there would be much traffic from its lead and zinc mines, but this did not materialise because technical mining problems. The railway could not meet the costs of the construction loans, and the company faced major financial problems, which were already serious because of the cost of widening the Beira railway. The only area likely to generate sufficient mineral traffic to relieve these debts was Katanga. Initially, the Congo Free State had concluded that Katanga's copper deposits were not rich enough to justify the capital cost of building a railway to the coast, but expeditions between 1899 and 1901 proved their value. Copper deposits found in Northern Rhodesia before the First World War proved uneconomic to develop.

In 1906 Union Minière du Haut Katanga was formed to exploit the Katanga mines. King Leopold favoured a railway route entirely in Congolese territory, linked to the Congo River. An Angolan railway from Lobito Bay to Katanga was also proposed, but in 1908, the BSAC agreed with Leopold to continuing the Rhodesian railway to Elizabethville and the mines. Between 1912, when full-scale copper production began, until 1928 when a Congolese line was completed, almost all of Katanga's copper was shipped over the Rhodesian network to Beira. Even after the Congo route was opened, up to a third of Katanga's copper went to Beira, and the mine's the supply of coal and coke mostly came from Wankie, the cheapest available source. This railway's revenue from Katanga enabled it to carry agricultural produce at low rates. Large-scale development of the Copperbelt only began in the late 1920s, with an increasing world market for copper. Transport was no problem as only short branches had to be built to connect the Copperbelt to the main line. The Beira route was well established and the BSAC wanted to prevent the Copperbelt companies taking advantage of other routes it did not control. The Benguela Railway to Angola, completed in 1931, provided the shortest, most direct route for copper from both Katanga and Northern Rhodesia, but it was never used to full capacity because both the Congo and the Rhodesias restricted its traffic in favour of their own lines.

When the BSAC administration of the Rhodesias was terminated, an agreement between the Colonial Secretary and the company of 29 September 1923 recognised that BSAC was entitled to protection because of the size of its railway investment in Northern and Southern Rhodesia. The agreement required the governors of each territory to refer any Bill authorising the construction of new railways or altering the rates that the existing railways charged to the Colonial Secretary. This prevented the legislatures of Northern or Southern Rhodesia from introducing competition or exerting pressure on the BSAC-controlled railways to reduce rates without British government sanction.

=== Railways and the settlers ===
European settlers had two main criticisms of British South Africa Company railway policy. Firstly, that its financial arrangements unfairly benefited the company and its shareholders, and secondly, that the settlers paid for these benefits through exorbitant railway rates. Although the allegations were probably ill-founded, they caused tensions between the settlers and the BSAC. On the shorter east coast route from Beira, running expenses were high because of construction debts and because the Mozambique Company, which was granted the original concession to build the railway in 1891, imposed a transit duty of up to 3% on goods destined for Rhodesia in return for the sub-concession to the Beira Railway Company. From 1914, the European settlers had a majority in the Advisory Council, and called for the replacement of BSAC control of the railways through nationalisation. In 1923 responsible government was achieved, but rather outright nationalisation, the settler government opted for a form of public control under the Railway Act of 1926. This left BSAC as owner of the railways, which were called Beira and Mashonaland and Rhodesia Railways until 1927, and Rhodesia Railways Limited after. This remained the situation until 1947, when the Government of Southern Rhodesia acquired the assets of Rhodesia Railways Limited.

== Commercial activities ==
=== Early trading ===
The company was empowered to trade with African rulers such as King Lobengula; to form banks; to own, manage and grant or distribute land, and to raise a police force (the British South Africa Police). In return, the company agreed to develop the territory it controlled, to respect existing African laws, to allow free trade within its territory and to respect all religions. Rhodes and the white settlers attracted to the company's territory set their sights for ever more mineral rights and more territorial concessions from the African peoples, establishing their own governments, and introducing laws with little concern or respect for African laws. The BSAC was not able to generate enough profit to pay its shareholders dividends until after it lost direct administrative control over Rhodesia in 1923.

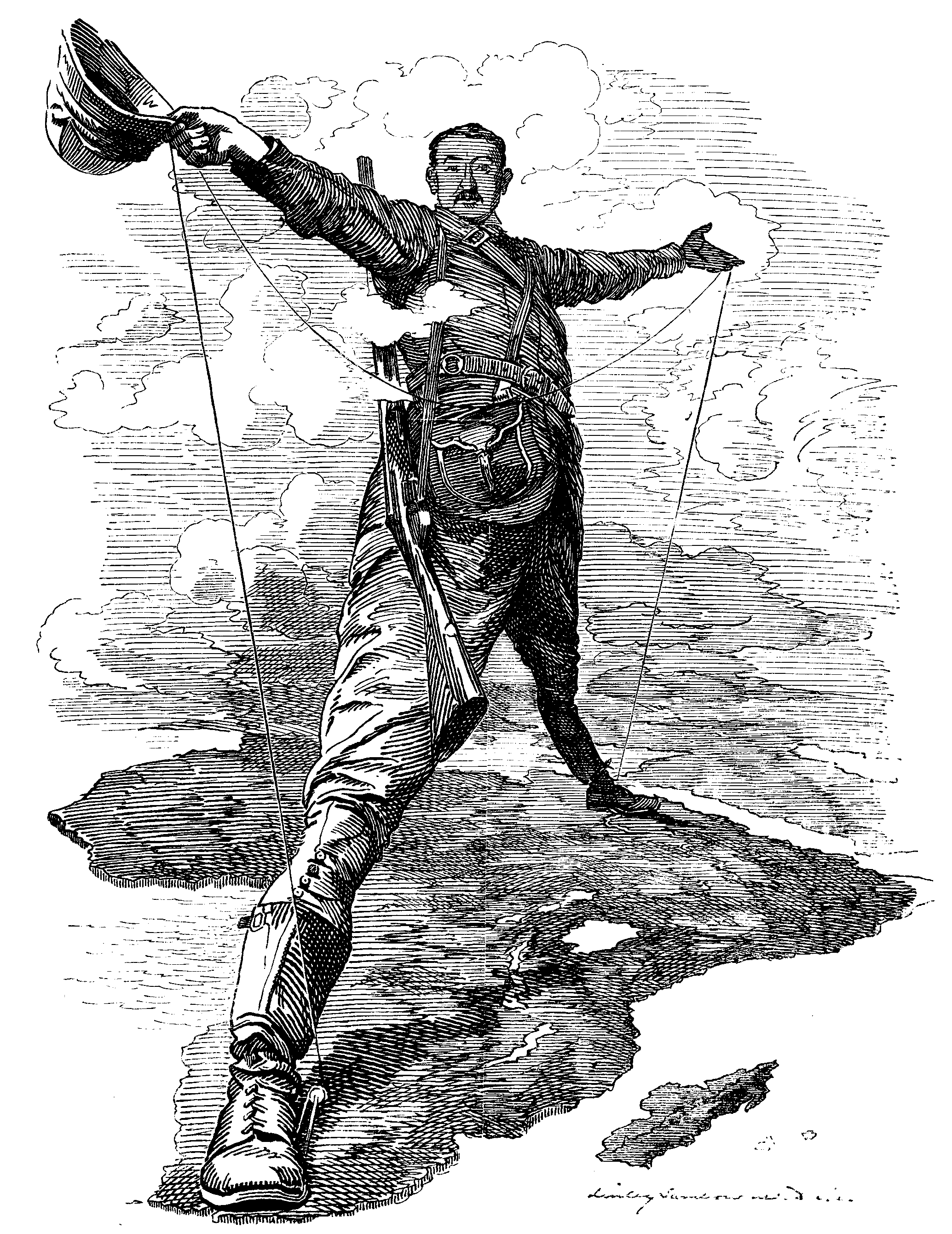
Africa from Cairo to the Cape (according to Cecil Rhodes)

=== Mining ===
==== BSAC claims ====
Initially, the British South Africa Company claimed mineral rights in both Northern and Southern Rhodesia. During the period of its Charter, the BSAC was not involved in mining directly, but received mineral royalties and held shares in mining companies. Often the main source of income of these companies was not in mining itself but in speculation markets. In Moshanaland, complaints arose at the delay of development of mines in order to fuel speculation profits further.

In 1923, the British government agreed that it would take over the administration of both Southern and Northern Rhodesia from BSAC. The Agreement for Southern Rhodesia provided that the company's mineral rights there should be granted protection, and any Bill under which the Southern Rhodesian legislature proposed to alter arrangements for collecting mining revenues or imposing any new tax or duty on minerals would require British government. The same condition applied to any Northern Rhodesian legislation. In 1933, the company sold its mineral exploration rights south of the Zambezi to the Southern Rhodesian government, but retained its rights in Northern Rhodesian mineral rights, as well as its interests in mining, railways, real estate and agriculture across southern Africa.

BSAC claimed to own mineral rights over the whole of Northern Rhodesia under one series of concessions granted between 1890 and 1910 by Lewanika covering a poorly defined area of Barotziland-North-Western Rhodesia, and under a second series negotiated by Joseph Thomson and Alfred Sharpe in 1890 and 1891 with local chiefs covering a disputed area of North-Eastern Rhodesia. This claim was accepted by the British Government. After the Charter ended, BSAC joined a group of nine South African and British companies which financed the development of Nchanga Mines, to prevent them falling under US control. However, its main concern was to receive royalties.

Ancient surface copper workings were known at Kansanshi (near Solwezi), Bwana Mkubwa and Luanshya, all on what later became known as the Copperbelt, and BSAC exploration in the 1890s indicated there were significant deposits in the area. However, they could not be commercially exploited until a railway had been built. A railway bridge across the Zambezi was constructed in 1903 and the line was continued northward, reaching Broken Hill in 1906, where the lead and zinc vanadium mine was opened, and reaching the Belgian Congo border in 1909. At that time, mining had started in Katanga, where rich copper oxide ores occurred near the surface. In Northern Rhodesia, the surface ores were of poorer quality, and copper was only worked intermittently at Bwana Mkubwa, until in 1924 rich copper sulphide ores were discovered about 100 feet below the surface.

In 1922, the Southern Rhodesian voters rejected the option of inclusion in the Union of South Africa and opted for responsible government: the Northern Rhodesian settlers were not consulted. The BSAC wanted to give up responsibility for administering Northern Rhodesia, but to preserve its mining and land rights by negotiating a settlement with the British government for both parts of Rhodesia. For Northern Rhodesia, the most important provision of that agreement was that the Crown would recognise that BSAC was the owner of the mineral rights acquired under the concessions obtained from Lewanika in North Western Rhodesia Certificates of Claim issued by Harry Johnston in North Eastern Rhodesia.

Under the Northern Rhodesian settlement, the company dropped its claim for reimbursement of a £l.6 million administrative deficit: in return the British Government agreed to give the BSAC half the net revenue from certain rents and land sales and recognised (or appeared to recognise) the company as the owner of Northern Rhodesia's mineral rights in perpetuity. The British Government could have bought out these rights by paying BSAC £l.6 million to meet its reimbursement claim, but declined to make the money available. This agreement was criticised then and later time by both African and European inhabitants of the territory. The elected unofficial members of the Legislative Council pressed for the royalties issue to be referred to the Privy Council, as the BSAC's title to unalienated land in Southern Rhodesia had been. Instead, for forty years up to Zambian independence, successive British Governments recognised the BSAC as owner of all underground minerals in Northern Rhodesia, and compelled anyone mining them to pay royalties to the company.

In 1923, the Northern Rhodesian copper industry was little developed, and the British government did not anticipate the future value of these mineral rights. It regarded them as a not very important part of the overall deal with the company. The lack of any challenge to the BSAC's claims and the decision not to refer them to the Privy Council led to suspicion that the company received favoured treatment. There were family links between a junior Colonial Office minister and the BSAC director leading its negotiations, but no evidence to suggest this led to any bias and the most probable explanation was that the importance of the minerals was overlooked in the haste to achieve a settlement. Because of lack of time, the agreement was not approved by the Attorney-General.

The 1923 Agreement stated that the Crown recognised British South Africa Company mineral rights acquired under the concessions either from Lewanika in Barotziland-North-Western Rhodesia or under Certificates of Claim in North-Eastern Rhodesia. These concessions did not cover all of Northern Rhodesia. In particular, they could not have conveyed mineral rights in the area of the Copperbelt from which most of the BSAC's royalties came, as the Copperbelt was outside these areas. However, the British Government had legal advice that the Colonial Office's recognition of the BSAC's rights in practice over a long period, and specific recognition of those rights in Rhodesia mining legislation, prevented it from challenging the rights.

==== Claims disputed ====
The first attempts to challenge BSAC royalty claims were made by the Governor of Northern Rhodesia between 1935 and 1937. The Governor, Sir Hubert Young, attempted to convince the Colonial Office that BSAC only owned mineral rights in the areas of the concessions from Lewanika and the Certificates of Claim from Johnston. This excluded most of the Copperbelt, as the area east of the Kafue River had never been ruled by Lewanika. The Colonial Office response was that BSAC ownership of mineral rights throughout Northern Rhodesia had been accepted in practice, and the references to the Lewanika concessions and Certificates of Claim should not be interpreted in a narrow sense.

Northern Rhodesian settler politicians were not convinced by the Colonial Office arguments, in particular the suggestion that, since the British government had previously recognised the BSAC claims, it could not challenge them now on the basis of a reinterpretation of terms of the 1923 agreement. Settler representatives proposed either that the BSAC mineral rights should be bought out or that punitive levels of tax should be imposed on BSAC royalties. After years of BSAC obstruction, the company was forced to agree in 1950 that it would surrender their mineral rights in 1986 without compensation, and meanwhile give 20% of its royalties to the Northern Rhodesian government.

The 1950 agreement continued through the period of the Federation of Rhodesia and Nyasaland, but at the end of Federation in 1963 the African leaders of what became Zambia sought its revision, proposing to buy out the British South Africa Company's mineral rights for a lump sum. The BSAC refused, and the Northern Rhodesian government of Kenneth Kaunda commissioned a full legal enquiry into the validity of the company's claims. The results were published as a White Paper which considered the validity of commercial rights held and exercised under the colonial legislative and administrative system.

The Northern Rhodesian government argued that many of the treaties on which BSAC relied were of doubtful validity and probably could not have effectively transferred mineral rights. Even if the treaties were valid, none if them covered the Copperbelt, and any subsequent agreements merely confirmed the company's rights if they were originally valid: they did not give the treaties retrospective validity. It further argued that, as the British government had wrongly allowed the BSAC to claim royalties it was not entitled to, the British government should pay any compensation it thought the company was due, and not place this burden on an independent Zambia. Shortly before the planned date for independence of 24 October 1964, Kaunda threatened to expropriate the BSAC immediately afterwards if no agreement were reached. On 23 October, BSAC agreed to give up any mineral rights it might have in return for compensation of £4 million, the British and Zambian governments paying half each.

=== Financial returns ===
Traders of B.S.A.C stock profited handsomely from the speculative trading of the stock which was trading for multiple times higher that its nominal book value on the LSE and the Rhodesian Stock Exchange which was initiated in the Masonic Assembly Room on 20 June 1894.A History of the Zimbabwean Stock Exchange An investor who invested in the original one million shares at £1 each and participated in each rights issue up to 1904, would have paid an average of £1.66 for each share. No dividends were received before 1924, but from then the average annual dividend for the next 26 years was 7.5 pence, a poor rate of return. However, from 1950, dividend rates increased sharply, reaching 75 pence a share in 1960, largely from Northern Rhodesian copper royalties. Each share was split two-for-one in 1955 and each of the new shares was exchanged for three Charter Consolidated shares at the beginning of 1965.

== Security ==
Clause 3 of the BSAC Charter allowed the company to obtain powers necessary for the preservation of public order in, or for the protection of, the territories comprised in its concessions, and Clause 10 allowed the company to establish and maintain a police force. This did not permit the formation of an army but BSAC created a paramilitary force of mounted infantrymen in 1889 which was virtually its army and which allowed it to defeat and replace the Matabele kingdom and then overcome resistance of the Shona north of the Limpopo river in the First Matabele War and Second Matabele War. It was the first British use of the Maxim gun in combat (causing five thousand Ndebele casualties). The company carved out and administered a territory which it named Zambezia, and later, Rhodesia, which now covers the area occupied by the republics of Zambia and Zimbabwe.

=== Southern Rhodesia ===
At first, the BSAC force was named the British South Africa Company's Police, but from 1896 it was called the British South Africa Police. The Colonial Office initially authorised a force of 100 men, but Rhodes increased this to 480 before the Pioneer Column entered Mashonaland. Its numbers had risen to 650 men by the end of 1890, an unsustainable burden on the BSAC resources. Rhodes ordered a reduction in its manpower to 100 at the end of 1891, and later to only 40 men. This was supplemented by the Mashonaland Horse, an unpaid volunteer force of up to 500 men. The police force was greatly increased in size at the time of the First Matabele War, although much if this increase was in the form of volunteer police reservists.

Although the police force had been created by the BSAC and was at first under the command of a company official, after the Jameson Raid it was renamed the British South Africa Police and ceased to be a company force. From then, it reported to the British High Commissioner for South Africa, not the BSAC, and was commanded by a British-appointed officer. This British South Africa Police had four divisions: two policed the countryside (but not the towns) of Matabeleland and of Mashonaland, another covered "North Zambesia" until the creation of the Barotse Native Police in 1899 and the fourth dealt with Bechuanaland until its own police force was formed in 1903. Also in 1903, the previously separate urban police forces were combined as the Southern Rhodesia Constabulary and handed over to BSAC control. In 1909, the Matabeleland and Mashonaland divisions were handed back to BSAC control and the separate urban police force was amalgamated with the British South Africa Police. Only in 1909 did the British South Africa Police constitute a police force for the whole of Southern Rhodesia and for Southern Rhodesia only. The British South Africa Police was initially formed as a wholly European force, but in 1903 an African unit was organised as the British South African Native Police. In 1909, this was merged into the British South Africa Police, which thereafter had an increasing number of African police officers. The volunteer forces raised for the Matabele wars and Mashona rebellion were disbanded soon after, but the Southern Rhodesia Volunteers, raised for service in the Boer War, remained in being and in 1914 formed the basis of the 1st and 2nd Rhodesia Regiments. Although these were severely reduced in size after the First World War, they formed the basis of the Rhodesian Territorial Force, set up in 1926 after the end of BSAC administration.

=== Northern Rhodesia ===
The BSAC considered that its territory north of the Zambezi was more suitable for a largely African police force than a European one. However, at first the British South Africa Police patrolled the north of the Zambezi in North Western Rhodesia, although its European troops were expensive and prone to diseases. This force and its replacements were paramilitaries, although there was a small force of European civil police in the towns. The British South Africa Police were replaced by the Barotse Native Police force, which was formed in 1902 (other sources date this as 1899 or 1901). This had a high proportion of European NCOs as well as all European officers and was merged into the Northern Rhodesia Police in 1911. Initially, Harry Johnson in the British Central Africa Protectorate had responsibility for North Eastern Rhodesia and Central Africa forces, including Sikh and African troops, were used there until 1899. Until 1903, local magistrates recruited their own local police, but in that year a North Eastern Rhodesia Constabulary was formed, which had only a few white officers, all its NCOs and troopers being African. This was also merged into the Northern Rhodesia Police in 1912, which then numbered only 18 European and 775 African in six companies, divided between the headquarters of the various districts. The Northern Rhodesia Police remained after the end of BSAC administration.

=== Medal ===
In 1896, Queen Victoria sanctioned the issue by the British South Africa Company of a medal to troops who had been engaged in the First Matabele War. In 1897, the Queen sanctioned another medal for those engaged in the two campaigns of the Second Matabele War: Rhodesia (1896) and Mashonaland (1897). The government of Southern Rhodesia re-issued the medal to commemorate the earlier 1890 Pioneer Column, in 1927.

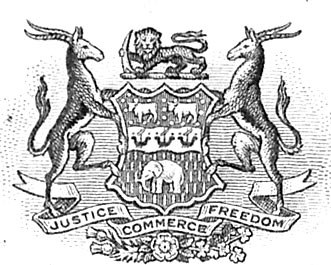
The arms of the British South Africa Company

== Politics ==
=== Legislature and administration ===
A legislative council for Southern Rhodesia was created in 1898 to advise the BSAC Administrator and the High Commissioner for South Africa on legal matters. Initially, this had a minority of elected seats, and the electorate was formed almost exclusively of those better-off white settlers who held BSAC shares. Over time as more settlers arrived, disputes between settlers and BSAC grew, and the company attempted to keep these in check by extending the franchise to some non-shareholders. However, in 1914, the Royal Charter was renewed on condition that settlers in Southern Rhodesia were given increased political rights, and from 1914, there was an elected majority on the Southern Rhodesian Legislative Council.

In Northern Rhodesia, there was neither an Executive Council nor a legislative council, but only an Advisory Council, which until 1917 consisted entirely of officials. After 1917 and a few nominees were added to represent the small European minority: Northern Rhodesia had no elected representation while under BSAC rule. Provision for elected unofficial members was only made after BSAC rule there came to an end in 1924. In both parts of Rhodesia, the BSAC Administrators were required to submit all draft Proclamations affecting Europeans to the High Commissioner for South Africa for approval before they were issued. The High Commissioner could in theory, and subject to certain restrictions, also make, alter or repeal Proclamations for the administration of justice, the raising of revenue, and for the peace, order and good government of either territory, without reference to their Administrators, although this power was never used.

The British South Africa Company was planning to centralise the administration of the two Rhodesias at the time of the Jameson Raid in 1896. Following the raid, the British government increased its oversight of BSAC affairs in Southern Rhodesia, and insisted on a separate administration in Northern Rhodesia. In both 1915 and 1921, BSAC again failed to set up a single administration for both Rhodesias. In part, this was because the Southern Rhodesian settlers feared that it more would be difficult for a united Rhodesian state to achieve responsible government.

=== Self-government ===
In 1917, the Responsible Government Association was formed as a political party to press for responsible government, and fought the 1920 Legislative Council election in opposition to those advocating union with the Union of South Africa. When the British courts decided that the ultimate ownership of all land which had not already been alienated into private ownership lay with the Crown, not with BSAC, the campaign a self-government gained strength.

In 1921, General Smuts and his government wished for the early admission of Southern Rhodesia into the Union of South Africa. When the Union was established, Natal and the Free State were given representation in the Union Parliament considerably in excess of the number of their electors, and Smuts promised that this would apply in the case of Rhodesia, which would receive 12 to 15 seats in the Union Parliament, which then had 134 members. Smuts also promised that South Africa would make the financial provision necessary to buy out the commercial rights of the BSAC. If those rights continued under responsible government, they would create a serious financial problem for that government. In 1922, the company entered negotiations with the Union government for the incorporation of Southern Rhodesia. However, as the BSAC charter was due to expire in 1924, a referendum was held in 1922 in which the electorate was given a choice between responsible government and entry into the Union of South Africa. Those in favour of responsible government won a significant, but not overwhelming, majority. In 1923, the British government chose not to renew the company's charter, and instead accorded self-governing colony status to Southern Rhodesia and protectorate status to Northern Rhodesia.

=== The end of BSAC administration ===
An agreement of 29 September 1923 between the British South Africa Company and the Colonial Secretary settled the outstanding issues relating to Southern and Northern Rhodesia. It terminated the company's administration of Northern Rhodesia by the British South Africa Company as from 1 April 1924: Northern Rhodesia continued to be a protectorate, but now governed by a Governor. All laws were to continue in force, and all rights reserved to indigenous peoples under treaties they had made with BSAC also continued in force. From 1 April 1924, control of all lands that the company claimed in Northern Rhodesia, were taken over by the Northern Rhodesian administration, to administer in the interests of their African populations, but BSAC were to receive half the net rents from these lands.

== Merger ==
In 1964, the company handed over its mineral rights to the government of Zambia, and the following year, the business of the British South Africa Company was merged with the Central Mining & Investment Corporation Ltd and The Consolidated Mines Selection Company Ltd into the mining and industrial business of Charter Consolidated Ltd, of which slightly over one-third of the shares were owned by the British/South African mining company Anglo American Corporation. In the 1980s the company disposed of its overseas mining concerns to concentrate on its British engineering interests.

In 1993 Charter Consolidated Ltd changed its name to Charter plc, and in 2008 to Charter Limited, which is incorporated in England and Wales, Company Number 02794949. The British South Africa Company still exists (though, its last annual return filing was in 2011), and is registered as a non-trading business incorporated in England and Wales, Company Number ZC000011.

== Gazettes published by the company ==
- British South Africa Company Government Gazette
- North-Eastern Rhodesia Gazette
- Northern Rhodesia Government Gazette

== See also ==
- Ellis Robins, 1st Baron Robins

== Sources ==
- D N Beach, (1971). The Adendorff Trek in Shona History, South African Historical Journal, Vol. 3, No. 1.
- R Blake, (1977). A History of Rhodesia, New York, Knopf. ISBN 0-394-48068-6.
- G. D. Clough, (1924). The Constitutional Changes in Northern Rhodesia and Matters Incidental to the Transition, Journal of Comparative Legislation and International Law, Third Series, Vol. 6, No. 4.
- F R Burnham, (1926). Scouting on Two Continents, LC call number: DT775 .B8 1926.
- G L Caplan, (1970). The Elites of Barotseland, 1878–1969: A Political History of Zambia's Western Province, University of California Press. ISBN 978-0-52001-758-0
- S Cunningham, (1981). The Copper Industry in Zambia: Foreign Mining Companies in a Developing Country, Praeger.
- Teresa Pinto Coelho, (2006). Lord Salisbury's 1890 Ultimatum to Portugal and Anglo-Portuguese Relations.
- B N Floyd, (1962). Land Apportionment in Southern Rhodesia Geographical Review, Vol. 52, No. 4.
- J S Galbraith, (1970). The British South Africa Company and the Jameson Raid, Journal of British Studies, Vol. 10, No. 1.
- J S Galbraith, (1974). Crown and Charter: The early Years of the British South Africa Company, University of California Press. ISBN 978-0-52002-693-3.
- L H Gann, (1958). The Birth of a Plural Society: The Development of Northern Rhodesia under the British South Africa Company, 1894–1914, Manchester University Press.
- P Gibbs, H Phillips and N Russell, (2009). "Blue & Old Gold" – The History of the British South Africa Police 1889–1980 30 Degrees South Publishers. ISBN 978-1920143-35-0.
- J Gilbert, (2006). Indigenous Peoples' Land Rights Under International Law: From Victims to Actors, BRILL, pp. 18–19. ISBN 978-1-571-05369-5
- Government of Northern Rhodesia (Zambia), (1964). White Paper on British South Africa Company's claims to Mineral Royalties, International Legal Materials, Vol. 3, No. 6.
- T Lloyd, (1972). Africa and Hobson's Imperialism, Past & Present, No. 55.
- A G Hopkins, (1976). Imperial Business in Africa. Part I: Sources, The Journal of African History, Vol. 17, No. 1.
- S Katzenellenbogen, (1974). Zambia and Rhodesia: Prisoners of the Past: A Note on the History of Railway Politics in Central Africa, African Affairs, Vol. 73, No. 290.
- A Keppel-Jones (1983) Rhodes and Rhodesia: The White Conquest of Zimbabwe 1884–1902, McGill-Queen's Press. ISBN 978-0-773-56103-8.
- J Lunn, (1992). The Political Economy of Primary Railway Construction in the Rhodesias, 1890–1911, The Journal of African History, Vol. 33, No. 2.
- G Macola, (2002) The Kingdom of Kazembe: History and Politics in North-Eastern Zambia and Katanga to 1950, LIT Verlag Münster. ISBN 978-3-825-85997-8
- Dougal Malcolm, (1939), The British South Africa Company 1889-1939
- M Newitt, (1995). A History of Mozambique, Hurst & Co. ISBN 1-85065-172-8
- M Newitt, (1969). The Portuguese on the Zambezi: An Historical Interpretation of the Prazo system, Journal of African History Vol X, No 1.
- J C Paiva de Andrada, (1885). Relatorio de uma viagem ás terras dos Landins, at Project Gutenberg
- J C Paiva de Andrada, (1886). Relatorio de uma viagem ás terras do Changamira, at Project Gutenberg
- J G Pike, (1969). Malawi: A Political and Economic History, Pall Mall.
- R K Rasmussen and S C Rubert, (1990). A Historical Dictionary of Zimbabwe, Scarecrow Press, Inc.
- R. I. Rotberg, (1965). The Rise of Nationalism in Central Africa : The Making of Malawi and Zambia, 1873–1964, Cambridge (Mass), Harvard University Press.
- K Rönnbäck & O Broberg (2019). Capital and Colonialism: The Return on British Investments in Africa 1869–1969. London: Palgrave Macmillan, 2019.
- P Slinn, (1971). Commercial Concessions and Politics during the Colonial Period: The Role of the British South Africa Company in Northern Rhodesia 1890–1964, African Affairs, Vol. 70, No. 281.
- R W Steel, (1957) The Copperbelt of Northern Rhodesia, Geography, Vol. 42, No. 2
- P E N Tindall, (1967). A History of Central Africa, Praeger.
- E.A. Walker, (1963). The Cambridge History of the British Empire: South Africa, Rhodesia and the High Commission Territories, Cambridge University Press.
- H. I Wetherell, (1979). Settler Expansionism in Central Africa: The Imperial Response of 1931 and Subsequent Implications, African Affairs, Vol. 78, No. 311.
