= North-Eastern Rhodesia =

Former British protectorate, now part of Zambia

- 1900–1911
- Flag
- Anthem: "God save the King/Queen"
- south-central Africa, 1899–1911; North-Eastern Rhodesia is shaded blue.
- Status: Protectorate
- Capital: Fort Jameson
- Common languages: English (official), Bemba & Nyanja, widely spoken
- Monarch
  - 1900–1901: Victoria
  - 1901–1910: Edward VII
  - 1910–1911: George V
- Administrator
  - 1900–1907 (first): Robert Thorne Coryndon
  - 1907–1909: Lawrence Aubrey Wallace
- Historical era: late 19th & early 20th century
  - Established: 29 January 1900
  - Amalgamated with Barotseland-North-Western Rhodesia as Northern Rhodesia: 17 August 1911

Area
  - Total: 109,000 sq mi (280,000 km^{2})
- Currency: Southern Rhodesian pound
Preceded by	Succeeded by
Mthwakazi	Northern Rhodesia
- Today part of: Zambia

North-Eastern Rhodesia was a British protectorate in south central Africa formed in 1900. The protectorate was administered under charter by the British South Africa Company. It was one of what were colloquially referred to as the three Rhodesian protectorates, the other two being Southern Rhodesia and Barotseland-North-Western Rhodesia. It was amalgamated with Barotseland-North-Western Rhodesia, another territory administered by the British South Africa Company, to form Northern Rhodesia in 1911.

== History ==
The colonisation of the region that would become North-Eastern Rhodesia began in 1890. Joseph Thompson was dispatched by Cecil Rhodes of the British South Africa Company to negotiate agreements with African chiefs. Alfred Sharpe was similarly dispatched by the British Consul for Nyasaland for the same purpose. After failing to secure any agreements, Sharpe and Thompson used force to subdue the local people. In 1895 the British South Africa Company was granted land and mineral rights over 10,000 square miles by Mozambique Gold, Land and Concession Company, a company it had bought in 1893. In order to better exploit the anticipated mineral wealth, the British South Africa Company incorporated a subsidiary, North Charterland Exploration Company in 1895. Effective administration of the region was achieved by the end of 1899.

In January 1900 Queen Victoria signed the North-Eastern Rhodesia Order in Council, 1900. This Order made official the name North-Eastern Rhodesia and formally proclaimed it a British protectorate. Under the Order a regime for the Company's governance of the new protectorate was established. The new protectorate was administered by an Administrator appointed by the High Commissioner for South Africa. The High Commissioner legislated by proclamation for the protectorate. The protectorate was divided into seven administrative districts.

In 1900 Robert Edward Codrington was appointed as the first Administrator. He held this post until 1907. The last person to serve as Administrator was Lawrence Aubrey Wallace from 1907 until 1909 after which the position was left vacant. The capital was at Fort Jameson, today called Chipata.

When the protectorate was amalgamated with Barotseland-North-Western Rhodesia to form Northern Rhodesia, the Administrator of Northern Rhodesia took over the functions that had been carried out by the Administrator of North-Eastern Rhodesia.

== Laws ==
The laws of England applied to the protectorate, as far as local circumstances permitted. In civil cases between natives, native laws applied so far as was not repugnant to natural justice, or morality, or to any Order in Council, or any regulation thereunder. The Protectorate had a High Court, District Courts and Magistrates' Courts. Appeals from the Protectorate Courts could be made to the Supreme Court of Cape Colony and from there to the Privy Council in the United Kingdom.

== See also ==
- British South Africa Company
- Company rule in Rhodesia
- Rhodesia (name)
- Northern Rhodesia
- Barotseland-North-Western Rhodesia
- Sir Robert Codrington, Administrator, 1900–1907
- North-Eastern Rhodesia Gazette
