= Kogi State House of Assembly =

Legislature of the Nigerian State of Kogi

The Kogi State House of Assembly is the legislative arm of the government of Kogi State of Nigeria. It is a unicameral legislature, with 25 members elected from the 21 local government areas of the state. Two local government areas with considerably larger populations are delineated into two constituencies each to give equal representation. This makes the number of legislators in the Kogi State House of Assembly 25.

The fundamental functions of the Assembly are to enact new laws, amend or repeal existing laws, and oversight of the executive. Members of the assembly are elected for a term of four years concurrent with federal legislators (Senate and House of Representatives). The state assembly convenes three times a week (Tuesdays, Wednesdays and Thursdays) in the assembly complex within the state capital, Lokoja.

All the 25 members of the 7th Kogi State House of Assembly session are members of the All Progressives Congress (APC).
