= John Kaunda =

Zambian footballer

John Kaunda is a former Zambian goalkeeper who played for Nchanga Rangers in the seventies. He is remembered for saving a penalty against Algeria in 1977 which saw Zambia through to 1978 African Cup of Nations finals.

== Career ==
Kaunda started out as a basketball player and was unknown until Rangers signed him on as a goalkeeper. The tall and solidly built Kaunda then developed into an international class shot stopper and made his debut when Zambia played Algeria in a CAN qualifier in Algiers in June 1977, ahead of regular goalkeeper Vincent Chileshe. Although Zambia lost 2–0, they reversed the score line two weeks later in Lusaka through a Godfrey Chitalu brace.

The match went into sudden death penalties after both sides had scored their first five penalties. Kaiser Kalambo scored Zambia's sixth penalty and then Kaunda pulled off a save against Ighili when he palmed the ball into the post.

He later described his match-winning feat: “After the Algerians had scored their fifth goal, I discovered that they were beating me in a set pattern. They had scored twice to my left and three times to my right so I knew 99.9 per cent that they would shoot to the left. I made up my mind to dive leftwards and for sure, there it was – a decisive save.”

Kaunda later played for KB Davies FC in Chingola.
