= Barotziland–North-Western Rhodesia =

Former British protectorate, now part of Zambia

- 1899–1911
- Flag
- Anthem: "God save the King/Queen"
- South-central Africa, 1899–1911; North-Western Rhodesia is shaded red.
- Status: British protectorate
- Capital: Kalomo (1899-1907), Livingstone (1907-1911)
- Common languages: English (official) Tonga and Lozi
- Monarch
  - 1899–1901: Victoria
  - 1901–1910: Edward VII
  - 1910-1911: George V
- Administrator
  - 1900–1907 (first): Robert Thorne Coryndon
  - 1907-1908: Robert Edward Codrington
  - 1909-1911 (last): Lawrence Aubrey Wallace
- Historical era: late 19th & early 20th centuries
  - Established: 28 November 1899
  - Amalgamated with North-Eastern Rhodesia as Northern Rhodesia: 17 August 1911

Area
  - Total: 182,000 sq mi (470,000 km^{2})
- Currency: Southern Rhodesian pound
Preceded by	Succeeded by
Barotseland	Northern Rhodesia
- Today part of: Zambia

Barotziland–North-Western Rhodesia was a British protectorate in Southern Africa constituted in 1899. It comprised the Lozi Kingdom, also known as Barotziland (alternative spelling Barotseland), with North-Western Rhodesia to its east. However both contemporary and later sources often use ‘North-Western Rhodesia’ more broadly as a shorthand for the protectorate as a whole. Barotziland in the formal title reflected its distinct political status through the Lochner Concession of 1890 (see History).

The protectorate was administered under charter by the British South Africa Company (BSAC). Within Barotziland, the Litunga (king) retained authority over customary law and certain internal matters, but his position was subordinate to the BSAC administration, particularly in external and sovereign affairs. The protectorate was the largest of what were colloquially referred to as the three Rhodesian protectorates, the other two being Southern Rhodesia and North-Eastern Rhodesia. It was amalgamated with North-Eastern Rhodesia, another territory administered by BSAC, to form Northern Rhodesia in 1911. The Rhodesia name has a complex usage history.

== History ==
The Lochner Concession signed in 1890 was a commercial and minerals rights agreement between BSAC and the Litunga Lewanika, the most powerful traditional ruler in the Barotse territory. Lewanika signed the treaty because he was fearful of attack from the Portuguese (in Angola to the west) and from the Ndebele (Matabele) to the south-east and so wished to have British protection.

The Lochner Concession did not confer protectorate status on the territory, as only the British government could confer that status. Nonetheless, the BSAC charter gave the Barotse territory protection.

In 1897 Robert Coryndon, private secretary to Cecil Rhodes, was sent by Rhodes to be the British South Africa Company representative in Barotseland. In October 1897 he reached King Lewanika's capital, Lealui, where he was given a cool reception. Lewanika could not initially accept that Coryndon could represent both the British South Africa Company and the United Kingdom government.

However, in November 1899 Queen Victoria signed the Barotziland–North-Western Rhodesia Order in Council, 1899. This Order amalgamated North-Western Rhodesia with Barotseland and established over the whole territory a protectorate named Barotziland–North-Western Rhodesia. Protectorate status was welcomed by King Lewanika.

Under the Order, a regime for the Company's governance of the new protectorate was established. The new protectorate was administered by an Administrator appointed by the High Commissioner for South Africa. The High Commissioner legislated by proclamation for the protectorate. The protectorate was divided into nine administrative districts.

In September 1900 Coryndon was appointed as the first Administrator. He held this post until 1907. Coryndon was replaced by Robert Codrington, who died within a year of taking up office as Administrator. The last person to serve as Administrator was Lawrence Aubrey Wallace. The capital was initially at Kalomo, and moved in 1907 to Livingstone.

When the protectorate was amalgamated with North-Eastern Rhodesia to form Northern Rhodesia in 1911, the Administrator of Northern Rhodesia took over the functions that had been carried out by the Administrator of Barotziland–North-Western Rhodesia.

== Laws ==
The laws of England applied to the protectorate, as far as local circumstances permitted. In actions between natives, native law and custom prevailed, save so far as the same were incompatible with the due exercise of His Britannic Majesty's power and jurisdiction. The High Commissioner was empowered to provide for the administration of justice. An Administrator's Court was established, consisting of three judges, of whom the Administrator was president, and Magistrates' Courts were also set up. Decisions of these Courts could be appealed to the Administrator's Court. Appeals from the Protectorate Courts could be made to the Supreme Court of Cape Colony and from there to the Privy Council in the United Kingdom.

== See also ==
- British South Africa Company
- Company rule in Rhodesia
- Rhodesia (name)
- Northern Rhodesia
- Barotseland
- Bibliography of the history of Zambia § Colonial Rhodesia era
