= Lozi secessionism =

Political movement in Southern Africa

Lozi secessionism is a political movement that advocates for the withdrawal of the Barotseland (also called "Lozi Kingdom") from Zambia to form an independent state. Barotseland is currently a non-sovereign monarchy within Zambia, governed by the Barotse Royal Establishment. The Caprivi Strip in Namibia, which used to be part of the precolonial Lozi Kingdom, is today inhabited by Lozis and has its own independence movement where supporters invoke Lozi history.

== History ==
=== Background and early history ===
Likely following a migration from the Lunda Empire, the Lozi Kingdom was founded in present-day Kalabo District during the 17th century with its first Litunga (king) being Mboo Mwanasilundu Muyunda. During his reign, two royal relatives, Mwanambinyi and Mange, split from the kingdom to establish their own polities. The 4th Litunga, Ngalama, conquered the breakaway polities and expanded the kingdom further to control the entire Bulozi Plain. The 6th Litunga, Ngombala, established a subordinate centre of power in the south to increase control over these new lands, and expanded the state even further to control the peripheral territories.

Over time power gradually shifted from the Litunga to the aristocratic bureaucracy (represented in the National Council or Kuta) as Litungas were compelled to make several concessions. By the reign of the 10th Litunga, Mulambwa, the kingdom was in a state of severe instability, and Mulambwa fought many wars. To succeed him, Mubukwanu and Silumelume fought an internecine civil war. Soon after the war concluded, the weakened kingdom was conquered by the Makololo around 1840 (who had fled the Mfecane). A rebellion in 1864 restored the kingdom, though factional infighting between different visions for the state ensued. After two unstable reigns, Lewanika came to power in 1878, though was deposed in 1884. Supported by traditionalists he returned to power in 1885, and set about consolidating his rule. He also revived several pre-Makololo institutions.

=== British colonisation and the early colonial period ===
In the late 1880s, the Lozi kingdom found itself surrounded by Portuguese, British, and German colonial expansion amid the Scramble. In 1886, when François Coillard established a missionary station in Sefula, Lewanika (on the advice of Khama, who had come under British protection in 1885) approached him and requested to become a British protectorate. In 1889 Coillard (now a trusted friend) agreed to mediate and relayed this to the administrator of Bechuanaland, (Note: Coillard was reluctant to facilitate British protection initially because European encroachment in the form of the Boers on Lesotho (where he had been previously) had caused war and disrupted Christian missions there. Regardless, he came to view British rule as necessary to remodel the traditional state and spread Christianity as part of the 'civilising mission'.) and a mineral prospector arrived later that year with gifts of firearms etc. and negotiated the Ware Concession about gold prospecting rights in Sesheke and Batoka (billed as a first step towards protection), which was later sold to Cecil Rhodes' British South Africa Company (BSAC). Lewanika saw this as conducive to strengthening his authority and Lozi claims over the wider region by having British support, and wanted 'modernisation' to enrich the elite through Lozi systems rather than revolutionise or 'civilise' these systems. In 1890, the Lochner Concession was negotiated with the BSAC, granting mining rights in the whole country in exchange for defence and the establishment of schools and industries, while respecting Lozi sovereignty. Many traditionalists were strongly opposed to this, despite Lochner distributing gifts and bribes. Under pressure, Lewanika rejected the Concession and lamented the missionaries as "liars" and "secret agents". (Note: Ngambela Mwauluka later declared that Lewanika would forfeit the kingship if he converted to Christianity.) Upon learning Lochner had misrepresented himself as brokering for the British Crown instead of a company (meaning protection was indirect), Lewanika was furious and felt further betrayed when British residence and other conditions did not materialise. Meanwhile, tension between Lewanika and the diviners had been building until 1892, (Note: Although Lewanika had initially found the Mbunda practices of witchcraft and divination helpful, in 1887 the diviners had targeted one of his close friends, who was subsequently killed.) when the Mbunda diviners targeted Lewanika directly. They claimed that he was responsible for a smallpox epidemic and the lack of rain. Several Manduna used this to further their opposition to the Lochner Concession, and Lewanika was accused of having sold the kingdom. Lewanika later ordered the diviners to be strangled, though this was prevented by Coillard's intervention, and from then on set about dismantling Mbunda influences. The grave threat from the Matabele dissipated after their defeat by the BSAC in 1893, somewhat restoring Lewanika's trust in the Company but also warning of the danger it exemplified.

By the end of the 19th century, the unyielding inevitability of European expansion had dawned on Lewanika, and he feared military invasion. In the 1890s, cattle plague and locusts caused famine, though this was offset by Lewanika's extensive canal system and expansion of agriculture. An influenza epidemic also hit the kingdom. Traditionalists were disempowered, and, after Mbunda diviners had begun targeting Europeans, Lewanika banned witchcraft accusations. In 1895, the Portuguese occupied some of the Lozi's western territory following the Anglo-Portuguese agreement to set their claims' borders at the Zambezi. Lewanika appealed to the British Crown. The first British resident arrived in 1897, (Note: The resident, Robert Coryndon, addressed the Kuta, saying that he had no interest in interfering in internal Lozi affairs, and wrote to Lewanika, saying "You are definitely under British protection. You gave a concession to the British South Africa Company. Afterwards you were afraid you had sold your country. Do not believe this: you have not sold your country.") and in 1898, the Lawley Concession was signed (without missionaries present). Whilst formalising protectorate status, it encroached on Lozi sovereignty by giving the BSAC some administrative rights over the Plain along with mining rights, and Lewanika was obliged to suppress witchcraft and slavery. The 1899 Order of Council treaty signed by Queen Victoria stipulated that the Lozi could maintain their laws and customs "except so far as the same may be incompatible with the due exercise of Her Majesty's power and jurisdiction".

With the 1899 Order, Lewanika lost powers over territory outside of the Valley (Bulozi proper) to the BSAC, and over the following years his authority was eroded. Company control over the Litunga was extended in exchange for support against traditionalist Manduna. A hut tax was established by the Company in 1902 and was strictly enforced, gravely affecting commoners; Company policy ignored development and intended for Bulozi to supply cheap labour on 'white-owned' farms and mines in Southern Africa, leading to out-migration. In 1905 and 1911 respectively, the kingdom lost territory in the west to Portuguese Angola and the Caprivi Strip to German South West Africa. In 1906, slavery was abolished, emancipating a significant portion of the population that could now pay taxes. That same year, the BSAC took over the granting of land to settlers, belying the meaning of Litunga as "owner of the land". The 1911 Order of Council merged Barotziland–North-Western Rhodesia and North-Eastern Rhodesia to form the protectorate of Northern Rhodesia, within which the kingdom effectively became a province. In 1914, the BSAC took over most of the Kuta's judicial functions.Throughout all this, Lewanika continued to seek direct protectorate status from the British Crown, but his efforts were unsuccessful, and dreams of a Lozi-British alliance faded. Amid a severe cattle epidemic, Lewanika died in 1916.

Lewanika was succeeded by his son Yeta III. Yeta and his generation's Manduna were mission-educated and highly competent in legal settings, and started lobbying for the Company rule to end and the return of Lozi rights per Lewanika's treaties. In 1924, administration was transferred directly to the British Crown, which favoured indirect rule and the maintenance of the status quo. After the British threatened removal of the Lozi elites' privileges (which were necessary for class differentiation), Yeta and the Kuta resolved that they would focus on maintaining the special status of Barotseland within Northern Rhodesia and that of the ruling class. (Note: In 1933, Yeta established Limulunga as the capital during high floods.) Bulozi remained poverty-stricken with little employment opportunities other than fishing amid the Crown's continuation of using the region for labour supply, which had caused large numbers of people to leave for mining in South Africa and the Copperbelt, as well as farming in Southern Rhodesia (now Zimbabwe). The 1930s saw jobs everywhere dry up, as well as floods, droughts, locusts (causing four crop failures in a row), cattle disease, and famine, leading to many Lozis being imprisoned or made to do forced labour for failing to pay the poll tax. In 1935, the Lozi government was legally formalised as the "Native Government" for Barotse Province despite opposition, becoming the "Barotse Native Government" (BNG). In 1945, Yeta abdicated and was replaced by his half-brother Imwiko. During Imwiko's reign, the Provincial Commissioner enacted reforms of the BNG, reviving a sub-council of the National Council/Kuta (the Katengo Kuta) that would be elected by regional councils and advise the Kuta, angering Manduna.

=== Zambian independence: The seeds of secessionism and the 1964 Barotseland Agreement ===
Imwiko was succeeded by Mwanawina III (a son of Lewanika) in 1948. Despite the elite being factionalised, they were united in opposition to merging Northern and Southern Rhodesia. Ideas of seceding from such a merger and becoming a separate protectorate began gaining currency, though Mwanawina instead sought the restoration of powers and distanced the kingdom from nationalist resistance. In return for some rights, Mwanawina supported the establishment of the Federation of Rhodesia and Nyasaland, plummeting his popularity with the public; people began to view the BNG as a corrupt, nepotic, and exclusionary government. In 1960, Kenneth Kaunda came to lead the United National Independence Party (UNIP) after his militant nationalist party was banned by the colonial government. Lozi elites viewed Kaunda's nationalists as "extremists" and, in 1960, restated their desire to secede from Northern Rhodesia. In 1962, the British government allowed Nyasaland and Southern Rhodesia to secede from the Federation but not Barotseland, prompting Lozi elites to accuse the British of breaking their treaties with Lewanika. In the crucial 1962 elections, royalists standing in Bulozi were overwhelmingly defeated by the nationalists of UNIP following a complacent campaign. The subsequent UNIP-NRANC government sought to reform the BNG; Lozi elites appealed to the British, but they did not want to antagonise nationalists nor finance the secession. In the election for the Katengo Kuta, UNIP presented secession as economically unviable and won every seat. Lozi elites changed their policy to seek semi-independent status within Zambia. Despite conciliatory relations, UNIP refused to mention Barotseland's status in the new constitution.

In May 1964 during formal discussions in London regarding independence, Mwanawina and Kaunda signed a separate treaty, the Barotseland Agreement 1964, granting the kingdom special status within an independent Zambia. Britain also signed it, but only as a witness, a distinction of which Mwanawina was unaware. In October 1964, Zambia gained independence.

=== Post-colonial era: Revocation of the Agreement and the growth of secessionism ===
The central government commissioned development projects and brought the Kuta within Lusaka's jurisdiction, which caused political conflict and was received by the Lozi elite as encroaching on their rights and violating the 1964 Agreement, of which Gerald Caplan wrote that the government had no intention of upholding. From 1965, Lozis began to blame the central government for the lack of material benefits since independence. The Kuta refused all cooperation with the central government, prompting the government to introduce the Local Government Bill, replacing the Kuta with five district councils. Mwanawina lost all his special rights (such as appointing councillors, the treasury, and vetoing of legislation) except for the allocation of land. The Chiefs Act also allowed the central government to revoke recognition of any chief, which now explicitly included the Litunga. The Kuta was outraged and discussed methods of resistance, and also appealed to the British for help. Popular opposition to the central government grew in Bulozi, and Lozi high-ranking members in UNIP were gradually sidelined while Bemba influence grew. Mwanawina died in 1968 and was replaced by Godwin Mbikusita, a purported son of Lewanika and hardline seccessionist. In the 1968 elections, the Zambian African National Congress (ZANC) won the most seats in Bulozi with 61% of the vote. In 1969, Kaunda proclaimed that Zambia was at "economic war" with Britain, South Africa, and the United States. He nationalised the copper industry and enacted several reforms, including removing the Litunga's right to assign land. Kaunda personally took control of UNIP, citing internecine divisions. The Barotse Province was renamed as "Western Province" and was given the same status as Zambia's other provinces. Later in 1969, the government passed a bill that officially revoked the 1964 Agreement to fierce opposition, though the position of Litunga was still recognised by the central government.

Zambia transitioned to a one-party state in 1973, and throughout the 1970s and 1980s, discourse about secession remained muted. The Litunga sought an amiable relationship with the government, while people in Bulozi became disillusioned with politics. Mbikusita was succeeded by Yeta IV in 1977, who was appointed to the Central Committee to represent Western Province. People had little appetite for secession amid the grave insecurity caused by the Angolan War and South African Defence Force attacks on Western Province, where SWAPO was basing its guerrilla war against South Africa. Following Namibia's independence from South Africa in 1994, Lozis founded the Caprivi Liberation Army (CLA) (whose leadership descended from Manduna who had been appointed by Lewanika). The CLA attacked the government in Caprivi in 1999, though they were quickly defeated. In Zambia Lozi figures played key roles in the re-establishment of multi-party democracy in 1990 through the Movement for Multi-Party Democracy (MMD). Following the 1991 elections, Frederick Chiluba formed the new government. Despite MMD receiving overwhelming support from Lozis in the elections, President Chiluba (himself a Bemba) did little to placate Lozi voters. Tensions grew between the Barotse Royal Establishment (BRE) and the central government, and secession gained popular support amid public demonstrations. In 1995, the government passed the Lands Act which de facto transferred the Litunga's informal right to allocate land (which he had retained despite its formal removal in 1969) to the president. The Kuta responded by stipulating that the 1964 Agreement be incorporated into the constitution, or the kingdom would return to its pre-1964 status. Currents of militant resistance grew, culminating in the Barotse Patriot Front (BPF), which in 1998 stated they would engage in armed conflict if Barotseland was not permitted to secede; after supporting the CLA in the 1999 Caprivi Conflict, they were banned by the Zambian government. A son of Mbikusita founded a Lozi separatist political party called Agenda for Zambia (AZ); in the 1996 general election, AZ won a seat in Bulozi, though their presidential candidate only won 27% of the vote in Western Province and 2.6% overall.

Yeta IV was succeeded by Lubosi Imwiko II. In 2005, the Mung'omba Constitution Review Commission recommended that the government and the BRE "resolve the outstanding issue of the Barotseland Agreement", after which President Mwanawasa commissioned the National Constitutional Conference, which reported in 2010. The BRE opposed the draft constitution because it did not refer to the 1964 Agreement. Just before the anniversary of Zambian independence in October 2010, public protests in Mongu against the draft constitution turned into rioting, to which the police employed tear gas and gunfire to disperse the crowd. These riots continued until climaxing in January 2011 when police killed two people and injured and arrested many more. The BRE distanced itself from the Lozi separatist organisations involved, and stressed the difference between restoring the 1964 Agreement and secession. In the 2011 general election, Michael Sata promised to "implement that agreement within 90 days" during his campaign, and later won the presidency. Despite this, the 1964 Agreement was not implemented. In 2012, the Kuta passed a resolution stating "We now inform Zambia and the international community that we finally accept the unilateral nullification and the abrogation of the Barotseland Agreement 1964 ... we can no longer be obliged to honor an international Agreement that the other party has nullified and abrogated, which has reverted us to our original status" (though the Litunga did not support this). The argument was that since the 1964 Agreement had abolished all treaties before it, and given that the Agreement itself had been terminated, Zambia had no legal basis to govern Barotseland, and the kingdom would revert to its pre-1889 sovereign status. Activists have since lobbied the African Union and the United Nations with little success. Barotseland joined the Unrepresented Nations and Peoples Organization (UNPO) in 2013, and as of 2019 it was engaged in a process to petition the International Court of Justice (ICJ).

== Political representation ==
=== Institutions ===
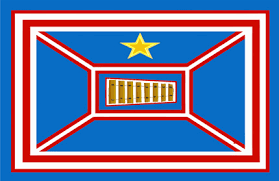
Flag of Barotseland

The government of Barotseland is the Kuta, presided over by the Ngambela (Prime Minister). The traditional kingdom was originally divided into north and south. The north being ruled by a man, the King, called the Litunga meaning "keeper" or "guardian of the earth", and the south is ruled by a woman, Litunga la Mboela or Mulena Mukwae, "Queen of the south". There are district Kutas headed by senior Indunas in Mongu, Senanga, Kalabo, Sesheke, Lukulu, Kaoma, and Shangombo districts, under each of which there is another series of regional Kutas, then a series of territorial divisions called Lilalo headed by Silalo Indunas.

=== Political parties ===
In the 1962 elections, the Barotse National Party was established to contest the two Barotseland districts, as part of an electoral alliance with the United Federal Party. In both districts, the BNP candidate heavily lost to the UNIP candidate.

Currently, there are three groups who claim to represent Barotseland. In January 2012, the president of Zambia, Michael Sata, met the representatives of the three groups at the Zambian State House in Lusaka. The groups are Linyungandambo, Barotse Freedom Movement (BFM), and the Movement for the Restoration of Barotseland. Experts have said that these three groups may become political parties should Barotseland gain independence. Fighting between the three groups has already surfaced. An article which appeared on the Zambian Watchdog, purported to be authored by a BFM representative, condemned the activities of the Linyungandambo group.

The various activist groups championing the self-determination of Barotseland have since formed one umbrella organisation called the Barotse National Freedom Alliance (BNFA) which is headed by the former Ngambela of Barotseland (Prime Minister) Clement W. Sinyinda.
