= Barotse Royal Establishment =

Non-sovereign monarchy within Zambia

The Barotse Royal Establishment (BRE), formerly the Barotse Native Government (BNG), is a non-sovereign monarchy within Zambia. Headed by the Litunga (king) and located in Western Province on the Bulozi Plain, it is the continuation of the precolonial Lozi Kingdom. The BRE also consists of the Kuta (National Council), and is divided into districts headed by Manduna (sing. Induna, Councillors). The current Litunga is Imwiko II.

== History ==
=== Background ===
==== Early history ====
Likely following a migration from the Lunda Empire, the Lozi Kingdom was founded in present-day Kalabo District during the 17th century with its first Litunga (king) being Mboo Mwanasilundu Muyunda. During his reign, two royal relatives, Mwanambinyi and Mange, split from the kingdom to establish their own polities. The 4th Litunga, Ngalama, conquered the breakaway polities and expanded the kingdom further to control the entire Bulozi Plain. The 6th Litunga, Ngombala, established a subordinate centre of power in the south to increase control over these new lands, and expanded the state even further to control the peripheral territories.

Over time power gradually shifted from the Litunga to the aristocratic bureaucracy (represented in the National Council or Kuta) as Litungas were compelled to make several concessions. By the reign of the 10th Litunga, Mulambwa, the kingdom was in a state of severe instability, and Mulambwa fought many wars. To succeed him, Mubukwanu and Silumelume fought an internecine civil war. Soon after the war concluded, the weakened kingdom was conquered by the Makololo around 1840 (who had fled the Mfecane). A rebellion in 1864 restored the kingdom, though factional infighting between different visions for the state ensued. After two unstable reigns, Lewanika came to power in 1878, though was deposed in 1884. Supported by traditionalists he returned to power in 1885, and set about consolidating his rule. He also revived several pre-Makololo institutions.

==== British colonisation and the early colonial period ====
In the late-1880s, the Lozi Kingdom found itself surrounded by Portuguese, British, and German colonial expansion amid the Scramble. In 1886, when François Coillard established a missionary station in Sefula, Lewanika (on the advice of Khama who had come under British protection in 1885) approached him and requested to become a British protectorate. In 1889 Coillard (now a trusted friend) agreed to mediate and relayed this to the administrator of Bechuanaland, (Note: Coillard was reluctant to facilitate British protection because European encroachment in the form of the Boers on Lesotho (where he had been previously) had caused war and disrupted Christian missions there. Regardless, he came to view British rule as necessary to remodel the traditional state and spread Christianity as part of the 'civilising mission'.) and a mineral prospector arrived later that year with gifts of firearms etc. and negotiated the Ware Concession about gold prospecting rights in Sesheke and Batoka (billed as a first step towards protection), which was sold to Cecil Rhodes' British South Africa Company (BSAC). Lewanika saw this as conducive to strengthening his authority and Lozi claims over the wider region by having British support, and wanted 'modernisation' to enrich the elite through Lozi systems rather than revolutionise or "civilise" them. In 1890 the Lochner Concession was negotiated with the BSAC, granting mining rights in the whole country in exchange for defence and the establishment of schools and industries, while respecting Lozi sovereignty. Many traditionalists were strongly opposed to this, despite Lochner distributing gifts and bribes. Under pressure, Lewanika rejected the Concession and lamented the missionaries as "liars" and "secret agents". (Note: Ngambela Mwauluka later declared that Lewanika would forfeit the kingship if he converted to Christianity.) Upon learning Lochner had misrepresented himself as brokering for the British Crown instead of a company (meaning protection was indirect), Lewanika was furious and felt further betrayed when British residence and other conditions did not materialise. Meanwhile, though Lewanika had initially found the Mbunda practices of witchcraft and divination helpful, in 1887 the diviners had targeted one of his close friends, who was subsequently killed. Tension between Lewanika and the diviners had been building until 1892, when the Mbunda diviners targeted Lewanika directly. They claimed that he was responsible for a smallpox epidemic and the lack of rain. Several Manduna used this to further their opposition to the Lochner Concession, and Lewanika was accused of having sold the kingdom. Lewanika later ordered the strangling of the diviners, though this was prevented by Coillard's intervention, and from then on set about dismantling Mbunda influences. The grave threat from the Matebele dissipated after their defeat to the BSAC in 1893, somewhat recovering Lewanika's trust in the Company but also warning of the danger it exemplified.

By the end of the 19th century, the unyielding inevitability of European expansion had dawned on Lewanika, and he feared military invasion. In 1895 the Portuguese occupied some of the Lozi's western territory following the Anglo-Portuguese agreement to set their claims' borders at the Zambezi. Lewanika appealed to the British Crown. Public opposition had been weakened by famine, cattle plague, locusts, and influenza, traditionalists were disempowered, and, after Mbunda diviners began targeting Europeans, Lewanika banned witchcraft accusations. The first British resident arrived in 1897, (Note: The resident, Robert Coryndon, addressed the Kuta, saying that he had no interest in interfering in internal Lozi affairs, and wrote to Lewanika, saying "You are definitely under British protection. You gave a concession to the British South Africa Company. Afterwards you were afraid you had sold your country. Do not believe this: you have not sold your country.") and in 1898 the Lawley Concession was signed (without missionaries present). While formalising protectorate status, it encroached on Lozi sovereignty by giving the BSAC some administrative rights over the Plain along with mining rights, and Lewanika was obligated to suppress witchcraft and slavery. The 1899 Order of Council treaty signed by British queen Victoria stipulated that the Lozi could maintain their laws and customs "except so far as the same may be incompatible with the due exercise of Her Majesty’s power and jurisdiction".

With the 1899 Order, Lewanika lost powers over territory outside of the Valley (Bulozi proper), and over the following years, fearing conquest, his authority was eroded. Company control over the Litunga was extended in exchange for support against traditionalist Manduna. Mission schools were established, mostly for the elite. A hut tax was established by the Company in 1902 and was strictly enforced, gravely impacting commoners; Company policy ignored development and intended for Bulozi to supply cheap labour to "White"-inhabited regions, provoking out-migration. A ruling in 1905 by the king of Italy on the Anglo-Portuguese dispute over the territory west of the Zambezi divided it evenly, nominally allocating half to Lewanika (in practice reducing his territory). In 1906, slavery was abolished, emancipating a significant portion of the population that could now pay tax. That same year, granting of land everywhere was transferred to the BSAC, belying the meaning of Litunga as "owner of the land". The Barotse National School (BNC) was established by Lewanika, also in 1906, aiming to produce English-speaking translators, tradesmen, and clerks. Lozi were often beaten for not paying respectful greetings to all "Whites", and the royal salute was now only to be used for Company leaders. In 1909, the Lozi's Caprivi Strip was given to Germany. The 1911 Order of Council merged Barotziland–North-Western Rhodesia and North-Eastern Rhodesia to form the protectorate of Northern Rhodesia (now Zambia), and, unbeknown to the Lozi elite, the kingdom effectively became a province. In 1914, all legal matters other than petty theft, property disputes, divorce, and adultery were made clear to be within the BSAC's jurisdiction and not the Kuta's. In a late effort to make himself important to the British, Lewanika facilitated 2000 Lozi to serve during World War I. Throughout all this, Lewanika continued to seek direct protectorate status from the British Crown, but his efforts were dismissed, and dreams of a Lozi-British alliance faded. Amid a severe cattle epidemic, Lewanika died in 1916.

Lewanika was succeeded by his son Litia, known as Yeta III. Yeta had been mission-educated, as were the sons of Manduna who gradually replaced their fathers. This new generation was highly competent in legal settings and began lobbying for Company rule to end and the return of Lozi rights. Amid rumours of direct British rule, Yeta told the High Commissioner that per the treaties, the BSAC's commercial rights were dependent on their administrative role. Relations between the ruling class and the Company became increasingly hostile as administrators criticised what was left of Lozi rule and undermined it. A 1921 petition Yeta handed to the High Commissioner called for direct British protection over their whole territory, the cancellation of earlier concessions to the BSAC, for the Litunga to get his agreed-upon share of the hut tax and funding for schools (i.e. the BNC), and the return of the Caprivi Strip (now administered by South Africa) and some Portuguese-Angolan territory, both of which had been transferred without consulting the Lozi and were legally dubious. The petition was wholly rejected. In 1924 administration was transferred directly to the British Crown, though the BSAC retained their mining rights. Rather than continue the policy of dismantling Lozi rule, the new Governor favoured indirect rule, with the then-current situation maintained. In exchange for annual payments to the elite, the practice of tribute labour was ended, and public infrastructure became badly neglected. Elites continued to seek privileges from the administration as a means of class differentiation, and in 1930 Yeta approached the Provincial Commissioner with a list of grievances. The Commissioner responded that further complaints would result in removal of privileges. Aware of the insecurity of their positions, Yeta and the Kuta resolved that they would focus on maintaining the special status of Barotseland in Northern Rhodesia and that of the ruling class.

Bulozi remained poverty-stricken with little employment opportunities other than fishing amid the Crown's continuation of using the region for labour supply, which had caused large numbers of people to leave for mining in South Africa and the Copperbelt, and farming in Southern Rhodesia (now Zimbabwe). The 1930s saw jobs everywhere dry up, as well as floods, droughts, locusts (causing four crop failures in a row), cattle disease, and famine, leading to many Lozi being imprisoned or made to do forced labour for failing to pay poll tax. During this Lozi elites continued to publicly show their privileges to emphasise their status.

=== Legal formalisation of the Barotse Native Government ===
In 1935 the Lozi government was legally formalised as the "Native Government" for Barotse Province to strong yet powerless opposition, becoming the "Barotse Native Government" (BNG) with "Native Courts" and a "Native Treasury". A plot to overthrow Yeta in 1937 while he attended the British king's coronation failed. In 1939 Yeta was paralysed and rendered mute by a stroke, later abdicating in 1945 to be replaced by his half-brother Imwiko. During Imwiko's reign, the Provincial Commissioner enacted reforms of the Barotse Native Government, reviving a sub-council of the National Council (the Katengo Kuta) that would be elected by regional councils and advise the National Council, angering Manduna. He also claimed a new policy to develop Bulozi. Manduna viewed this with suspicion as just "another white man's trick to steal land" and refused to lease land for it; Imwiko signed the lease independently and died soon after in 1948, provoking rumours of assassination.

=== Decolonisation ===
The Northern Rhodesia Congress (NRC), a nationalist political party, was founded in 1948, the same year Imwiko died. Imwiko was succeeded by Mwanawina III (a son of Lewanika), who had easily defeated the colonists' preferred candidate in a vote in the Kuta. Mwanawina removed the old Ngambela and charged him with poisoning Imwiko among other charges. The elite remained factionalised and divided, with lots of scheming from potential kingship candidates and supportive Manduna to succeed the old Mwanawina, while other educated Lozi (intelligentsia) opposed the elite. The only issue that united the elite was in opposing murmurings of merging Northern and Southern Rhodesia (which was lobbied for by European settlers); the idea of seceding from such a merger and becoming a separate protectorate began gaining currency. After receiving assurances from the British government that they would be consulted regarding any constitutional changes, Mwanawina changed his policy to seek genuine protectorate status within Northern Rhodesia and restoration of powers. He also sought to keep the kingdom's interests separate from those of common Rhodesians, telling Lozi not to engage in the then-current nationalist resistance against the colonial government. In 1952 Barotse Province was changed to "Barotseland Protectorate" and the need for approval for appointments of Manduna was revoked, in exchange for Mwanawina's support for the establishment of the Federation of Rhodesia and Nyasaland. Mwanawina's popularity plummeted as commoners and nationalists (including most Lozi) strongly opposed the Federation, and the anti-royalist and nationalist Barotse National Association was formed against what they viewed as a corrupt, nepotic, and exclusionary government. Contemporary public opinion also believed Mwanawina responsible for Imwiko's death. In 1958, a nationalist militant group called Zambian African National Congress (ZANC) led by Kenneth Kaunda split from the Northern Rhodesian African National Congress (NRANC, formerly the NRC), and was subsequently banned by the colonial government in 1959, after which it was succeeded by the United National Independence Party (UNIP). Lozi elites (supported by the colonial government) viewed Kauda's nationalists as "extremists" and in 1960 restated their desire to secede from Northern Rhodesia, provoking calls for overthrowing them, and the Barotse Anti-Secession Movement (BASMO) was formed (a wing of UNIP, which was banned in Bulozi). In 1962, the British government allowed Nyasaland and Southern Rhodesia to secede from the Federation but not Barotseland, to which Lozi elites replied that the British were breaking their treaties with Lewanika. In the crucial 1962 elections, the royalists standing in Bulozi (represented by the Barotse National (or "Sicaba") Party) were defeated by the nationalists of UNIP, only garnering 107 votes to UNIP's 1,745 following a complacent campaign. The subsequent UNIP-NRANC government sought to reform the BNG; Lozi elites appealed to the British but they didn't want to antagonise nationalists nor finance the secession. In the election for the Katengo Kuta, UNIP presented secession as economically unviable and won every seat. Lozi elites changed their policy to seek semi-independent status in Zambia. After UNIP's victory in the 1964 elections, Mwanawina sought support from Portugal and South Africa. An agreement between the Litunga's representatives and Kaunda's UNIP was reached in 1963 that "Northern Rhodesia and Barotseland will go forward to independence as one country", however UNIP refused to have it in the new constitution.

In May 1964 during formal discussions in London regarding independence, Mwanawina and Kaunda signed a separate treaty, the Barotseland Agreement 1964, granting the kingdom special status within an independent Zambia. Britain also signed it, but only as a witness, a distinction of which Mwanawina was unaware. In October 1964, Zambia gained independence.

=== Post-colonial era ===
Conflict between traditional and elected councillors at the Kuta in Lealui in the months prior to independence saw that none of UNIP's desired reforms to the BNG were enacted. After Mwanawina and the Kuta opposed government development projects in Bulozi, and stated their wish for Barotseland to be a sister-state in federation with Zambia where the government provided funding but held no control in Bulozi, the government in Lusaka progressed with the reforms anyway. Kutas (courts/councils) were to be within the central government's jurisdiction, and development projects were to bypass the BNG. Lozi elites proclaimed that this violated the 1964 Agreement, of which Gerald Caplan writes that UNIP never intended to respect. Throughout 1965 Lozi authorities continued to delay the projects, and people in Bulozi started to blame the central government for the lack of benefits since independence. The Kuta refused all cooperation with the central government, prompting the government to introduce the Local Government Bill, replacing the Kuta with five district councils, and Mwanawina lost all his rights (such as appointing councillors, control of the treasury, and vetoes of legislation) except for allocation of land. The Chiefs Act also allowed the central government to revoke recognition of any chief, which now explicitly included the Litunga. The Kuta was outraged and discussed methods of resistance, and appealed to the British for help. Popular opposition to the central government grew in Bulozi, and Bemba influence in UNIP was blamed for lack of promised benefits from independence. A Lozi high-ranking member sacked by Kaunda became leader of the United Party in 1966 to oppose UNIP. UNIP became fragmented as Bemba control grew, and Lozi members lost in elections to the Central Committee. In 1968 conflict between UP and UNIP supporters led to the deaths of two UNIP officials, causing the government to ban UP to the dismay of many Lozi. Mwanawina died that year and was replaced by Godwin Mbikusita, a purported son of Lewanika and hard-line successionist with "White connections". The 1968 elections ZANC (formerly NRANC and NRC), to which UP members had migrated to, won most seats in Bulozi with 61% of the vote. In 1969, a referendum passed giving parliament the power to change the constitution unilaterally, despite Lozi opposition. During a meeting some Bemba UNIP members intended to start a vote of no confidence regarding the highest-ranked Bemba, Simon Kapwepwe; Kaunda responded by proclaiming Zambia was at "economic war" with Britain, South Africa, and the United States. He nationalised the copper industry and enacted several reforms, including removing the Litunga's right to assign land. Kapwepwe resigned as Vice President, after which Kaunda personally took control of UNIP, citing internecine divisions. The Barotse Province was renamed as "Western Province" and was given the same status as Zambia's other provinces. Later in 1969, the government passed a bill that officially revoked the 1964 Agreement to fierce opposition.

Zambia transitioned to a one-party state in 1973, and throughout the 1970s and '80s discourse about secession remained muted. The Litunga sought an amiable relationship with the government, while people in Bulozi became disillusioned, resulting in very low turnouts in general elections. Mbikusita was succeeded by Yeta IV in 1977, who was appointed to the Central Committee to represent Western Province. Further concessionary appointments were made by the government to quell secessionist propaganda that was circulating. People had little appetite for secession amid grave insecurity caused by the Angolan War and South African Defence Force attacks on Western Province where SWAPO were basing their guerrilla war against South Africa. Following Namibia's independence from South Africa in 1994, Lozi founded the Caprivi Liberation Army (CLA) with the goal of secession for the Caprivi Strip. Leading members of the CLA descended from Manduna that had been appointed by Lewanika, and the movement utilised references to Lozi history. In 1999 the CLA attacked the government in Caprivi, though were quickly defeated. Its leaders fled into exile or were charged with treason.

Lozi figures played key roles in the re-establishment of multi-party democracy in Zambia in 1990 through the Movement for Multi-Party Democracy (MMD). In the 1991 elections, several won seats in Western Province, and MMD led by Frederick Chiluba formed the new government. Despite MMD receiving overwhelming support from Lozi in the elections, Chiluba (himself a Bemba) did little to placate Lozi voters. Tensions grew between the Barotse Royal Establishment (BRE) and the central government, and secession gained popular support amid public demonstrations. In 1995 the government passed the Lands Act which diminished the Litunga's powers to allocate land. Amid calls for militant resistance and police raids that year, 30 rocket launchers, hand grenades, land mines, and explosives were found by police in Western Province (likely received from UNITA in Angola). The Kuta responded by stipulating that the 1964 Agreement be incorporated into the constitution, or that the kingdom returns to its pre-1964 status. A son of Mbikusita founded a Lozi separatist political party called Agenda for Zambia (AZ), while a Lozi prince founded Barotse Patriot Front (BPF). In the 1996 general election, AZ won a seat in Bulozi, though their presidential candidate only won 27% of the vote in Western Province and 2.6% overall. In 1998 the BPF stated they would engage in armed conflict if Barotseland wasn't permitted to secede. The BPF supported the CLA during the 1999 Caprivi Conflict, after which the Zambian government banned it.

Yeta IV was succeeded by Lubosi Imwiko II. In 2005 the Mung'omba Constitution Review Commission recommended that the government and the BRE "resolve the outstanding issue of the Barotseland Agreement", after which President Mwanawasa commissioned the National Constitutional Conference which reported in 2010. The BRE opposed the draft constitution because it made no reference to the 1964 Agreement. Just prior to the anniversary of independence in October 2010, public protests in Mongu against the draft constitution turned into rioting, to which the police employed tear gas and gunfire to split-up the crowd. These riots continued until climaxing in January 2011 with the police killing two people and injuring and arresting more. The Lozi organisations involved were the Barotse Freedom Movement (BFM), Movement for the Restoration of Barotseland (MOREBA), Linyungandambo, and the BPF, who the BRE distanced themselves from and stressed the difference between restoring the 1964 Agreement and secession. In the 2011 general election Michael Sata promised to "implement that agreement within 90 days" during his campaign, and later won the presidency. Despite this, the 1964 Agreement wasn't implemented. In 2012, the Kuta passed a resolution stating "We now inform Zambia and the international community that we finally accept the unilateral nullification and the abrogation of the Barotseland Agreement 1964 … we can no longer be obliged to honor an international Agreement that the other party has nullified and abrogated, which has reverted us to our original status", though the Litunga did not support this. The argument was that the 1964 Agreement had abolished treaties prior to it, and that if the Agreement was terminated, the kingdom would revert to its pre-1889 sovereign status. Activists have since lobbied the African Union and United Nations with little success. Barotseland joined the Unrepresented Nations and Peoples Organization (UNPO) in 2013, and as of 2019 they are engaged in a process to petition the International Court of Justice (ICJ). In 2024, President Hichilema stated that there is no country called "Barotseland", prompting negative reactions from the BRE and the resignation of a Lozi politician from the government.

== Institutions ==
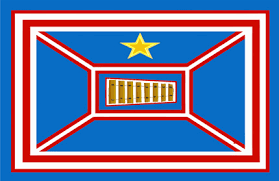
Flag of Barotseland

The government of Barotseland is the Kuta, presided over by the Ngambela (Prime Minister). The traditional kingdom was originally divided into north and south. The north being ruled by a man, the King, called the Litunga meaning "keeper" or "guardian of the earth", and the south is ruled by a woman, Litunga la Mboela or Mulena Mukwae, "Queen of the south". There are district Kutas headed by senior Indunas in Mongu, Senanga, Kalabo, Sesheke, Lukulu, Kaoma, and Shangombo districts, under each of which there is another series of regional Kutas, then a series of territorial divisions called Lilalo headed by Silalo Indunas.
