= List of elections in 1991 =

The following elections occurred in the year 1991.

== Africa ==
- 1991 Algerian legislative election
- 1991 Beninese parliamentary election
- 1991 Beninese presidential election
- 1991 Burkinabé presidential election
- 1991 Cape Verdean parliamentary election
- 1991 Cape Verdean presidential election
- 1991 Equatorial Guinean constitutional referendum
- 1991 Mauritian general election
- 1991 Sierra Leonean constitutional referendum
- 1991 São Tomé and Príncipe legislative election
- 1991 São Tomé and Príncipe presidential election
- 1991 Zambian general election

== Asia ==
- 1991 Azerbaijani presidential election
- 1991 Armenian presidential election
- 1991 Bangladeshi general election
- 1991 Bangladeshi presidential election
- 1991 Bangladeshi constitutional referendum
- 1991 Cypriot legislative election
- 1991 Georgian presidential election
- 1991 Kazakh presidential election
- 1991 Kyrgyz presidential election
- 1991 Nepalese legislative election
- 1991 North Korean local elections
- 1991 Omani general election
- 1991 Republic of China National Assembly election
- 1991 Singaporean general election
- 1991 Sarawak state election
- 1991 South Korean local elections
- 1991 Syrian presidential election
- 1991 Uzbekistani presidential election
- 1991 Tajik presidential election
- 1991 Turkish general election
- 1991 Yemeni constitutional referendum

=== India ===
- 1991 Indian general election
- Indian general election in Andhra Pradesh, 1991
- Indian general election in Haryana, 1991
- Indian general election in Tamil Nadu, 1991
- 1991 Tamil Nadu legislative assembly election

=== Malaysia ===
- 1991 Sarawak state election

== Europe ==
- 1991 Abkhazian New Union Treaty referendum
- 1991 Åland legislative election
- 1991 Albanian parliamentary election
- 1991 Andorran local elections
- 1991 Armenian presidential election
- 1991 Azerbaijani presidential election
- 1991 Belgian general election
- 1991 Bulgarian parliamentary election
- Estonian independence referendum, 1991
- 1991 Finnish parliamentary election
- 1991 Georgian independence referendum
- 1991 Georgian presidential election
- 1991 Icelandic parliamentary election
- 1991 Irish local elections
- 1991 Liechtenstein local elections
- 1991 Liechtenstein referendum
- 1991 Macedonian independence referendum
- 1991 Norwegian local elections
- 1991 Polish parliamentary election
- 1991 Portuguese legislative election
- 1991 Portuguese presidential election
- 1991 Romanian constitutional referendum
- 1991 Stockholm municipal election
- 1991 Swedish general election
- 1991 Swedish municipal elections
- 1991 Swiss federal election
- 1991 Swiss referendums
- 1991 Turkish general election
- 1991 Ukrainian independence referendum
- 1991 Ukrainian presidential election

=== Austria ===
- 1991 Burgenland state election

=== Germany ===
- 1991 Rhineland-Palatinate state election

=== Moldova ===
- 1991 Moldovan presidential election
- 1991 Transnistrian independence referendum
- 1991 Transnistrian presidential election

=== Russia ===
- 1991 Russian presidential election
- 1991 Russian presidential referendum

=== Spain ===
- Elections to the Aragonese Corts, 1991
- Elections to the Corts Valencianes, 1991
- 1991 Spanish local elections

=== United Kingdom ===
- 1991 Hemsworth by-election
- 1991 Kincardine and Deeside by-election
- 1991 Langbaurgh by-election
- 1991 Liverpool Walton by-election
- 1991 Monmouth by-election
- 1991 Neath by-election
- 1991 Ribble Valley by-election

==== United Kingdom local ====
- 1991 United Kingdom local elections

===== English local =====
- 1991 Bristol City Council elections
- 1991 Manchester Council election
- 1991 Trafford Council election
- 1991 Wolverhampton Council election

== North America ==
- 1989–1991 Belizean municipal elections
- 1991 Greenlandic general election
- 1991 Salvadoran legislative election
- 1991 Mexican legislative election

=== Canada ===
- 1991 Brantford municipal election
- 1991 British Columbia general election
- 1991 British Columbia recall and initiative referendum
- 1991 New Brunswick general election
- 1991 Northwest Territories general election
- 1991 Ottawa municipal election
- 1991 Progressive Conservative Party of New Brunswick leadership election
- 1991 Saskatchewan general election
- 1991 Toronto municipal election
- 1991 Windsor municipal election

=== Caribbean ===
- 1991 Barbadian general election
- 1990–1991 Haitian general election
- 1991 Montserratian general election
- 1991 Trinidad and Tobago general election
- 1991 Turks and Caicos Islands general election

=== United States ===
- 1991 United States elections

==== United States lieutenant gubernatorial ====
- 1991 Kentucky lieutenant gubernatorial election
- 1991 Louisiana lieutenant gubernatorial election

==== United States gubernatorial ====
- 1990–91 Arizona gubernatorial election
- 1991 Kentucky gubernatorial election
- 1991 Louisiana gubernatorial election
- 1991 Mississippi gubernatorial election
- 1991 United States gubernatorial elections

==== United States House of Representatives ====
- 1991 United States House of Representatives elections
- 1991 Arizona's 2nd congressional district special election
- 1991 Illinois's 15th congressional district special election
- 1991 Massachusetts's 1st congressional district special election
- 1991 Pennsylvania's 2nd congressional district special election
- 1991 Texas's 3rd congressional district special election
- 1991 Virginia's 7th congressional district special election

==== United States Senate ====
- 1991 United States Senate elections
- 1991 United States Senate special election in Pennsylvania

==== United States mayoral elections ====
- 1991 Baltimore mayoral election
- 1991 Boston mayoral election
- 1991 Burlington, Vermont mayoral election
- 1991 Chicago mayoral election
- 1991 Columbus, Ohio mayoral election
- 1991 Durham mayoral election
- 1991 Evansville, Indiana, mayoral election
- 1991 Fort Wayne mayoral election
- 1991 Hartford mayoral election
- 1991 Houston mayoral election
- 1991 Indianapolis mayoral election
- 1991 Jacksonville mayoral election
- 1991 Knoxville mayoral election
- 1991 Las Vegas mayoral election
- 1991 Manchester, New Hampshire, mayoral election
- 1991 Philadelphia mayoral election
- 1991 San Francisco mayoral election
- 1991 Sioux Falls mayoral election
- 1991 South Bend mayoral election
- 1991 Springfield, Massachusetts mayoral election
- 1991 Tampa mayoral election
- 1991 Toledo, Ohio mayoral election
- 1991 Tucson mayoral election
- 1991 West Palm Beach mayoral election
- 1991 Worcester, Massachusetts mayoral election

== Oceania ==
- 1991 French Polynesian legislative election
- 1991 Kiribati parliamentary election
- 1991 Kiribati presidential election
- 1991 Micronesian general election
- 1991 Micronesian constitutional referendum
- 1991 Vanuatuan general election
- 1991 Western Samoan general election

=== Australia ===
- 1991 Floreat state by-election
- 1991 Geraldton state by-election
- 1991 Menzies by-election
- 1991 Millner by-election
- 1991 New South Wales referendum
- 1991 New South Wales state election
- 1991 Shepparton state by-election

== South America ==
- 1991 Argentine legislative election
- 1991 Bolivian municipal elections
- 1991 Colombian parliamentary election
- 1991 Paraguayan Constitutional Assembly election
- 1991 Surinamese general election
