= Senanga (constituency) =

Constituency of the National Assembly of Zambia

Senanga was a constituency of the National Assembly of Zambia. It covered Senanga and surrounding areas in Senanga District of Western Province.

== List of MPs ==
Election year	MP	Party
Senanga
1964	Munukayumbwa Sipalo	United National Independence Party
Seat abolished (Senanga split into Senanga East and Senanga West)
1973	Willie Harrington	United National Independence Party
1974 (by-election)	Livinus Mukwe	United National Independence Party
1978	Livinus Mukwe	United National Independence Party
1983	Likando Kalaluka	United National Independence Party
1988	Likando Kalaluka	United National Independence Party
1991	Inonge Mbikusita-Lewanika	Movement for Multi-Party Democracy
1993 (by-election)	Inonge Mbikusita-Lewanika	National Party
1996	William Harrington	Movement for Multi-Party Democracy
2001	Albert Situmbeko	United Party for National Development
2006	Clement Sinyinda	Movement for Multi-Party Democracy
2011	Likando Mufalali	United Party for National Development
2016	Mukumbuta Mulowa	United Party for National Development
2021	Walusa Mulaliki	United Party for National Development
Seat abolished (split into Senanga North and Senanga South)
