= Lewanika =

Litunga of Barotseland

- Litunga
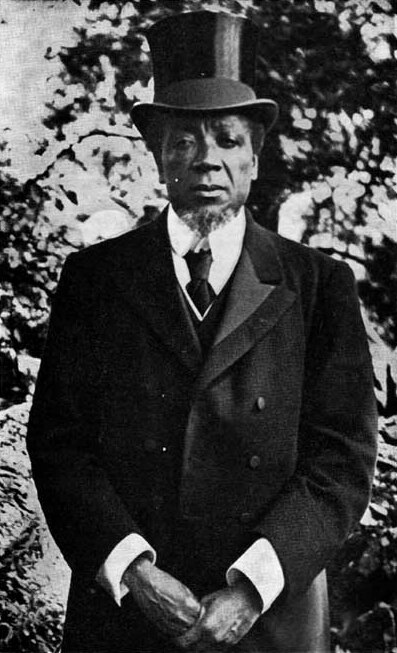
- Lewanika photographed during his visit to Edinburgh in 1902

Litunga of Barotseland
- First reign: 1878–1884
- Predecessor: Mwanawina II
- Successor: Tatila Akufuna
- Second reign: 1885–1916
- Predecessor: Tatila Akufuna
- Successor: Yeta III; Mokamba (regent)
- Born: c. 1842 near Nyengo Swamp, Barotseland
- Died: 4 February 1916 (aged c. 74); Lealui, Barotseland, Northern Rhodesia
- Burial: Nanikelako, Mongu District, Western Province, Zambia
- Consort: Ntelamo (Ma-Litia)
- Issue: Yeta III; Imwiko; Mwanawina III; Godwin Mbikusita Lewanika II
- Father: Prince Litia Mulambwa
- Mother: Inonge Wamunyima

Lewanika (c. 1842 – 4 February 1916) (also known as Lubosi, Lubosi Lewanika or Lewanika I) was the Lozi Litunga (King) of Barotseland from 1878 to 1884 and again from 1885 to 1916. A detailed, although biased, description of King 'Lubossi' (the spelling used) can be found in the Portuguese explorer Alexandre de Serpa Pinto's 1878–1879 travel narrative Como eu atravessei a África (How I Crossed Africa, in English translation).

== Biography ==
In December 1882, the missionary Frederick Stanley Arnot reached Lealui, the capital of Barotseland, after traveling across the Kalahari Desert from Botswana. King Lewanika kept him for the next eighteen months, then allowed him to move on, but in a westward direction rather than eastward as he had planned. While detained, Arnot taught the king's children to read and undertook some evangelism. Arnot was present when Lewanika received a proposal from the Ndebele for an alliance to resist the white men. Arnot may have helped Lewanika to see the advantages of a British protectorate in terms of the greater wealth and security it would provide. Arnot left Bulozi in 1884 to recover his health and to escape a brewing rebellion against Lewanika.

When Lewanika crushed the rebellion, George Westbeech described the scene: "The flat from Lia-liue to Mongu, a distance of twelve miles without a bush, is even now covered with skeletons and grinning skulls...." Before this event, his name had simply been Lubosi; after it, he had taken on the name Lewanika (meaning "Conqueror").

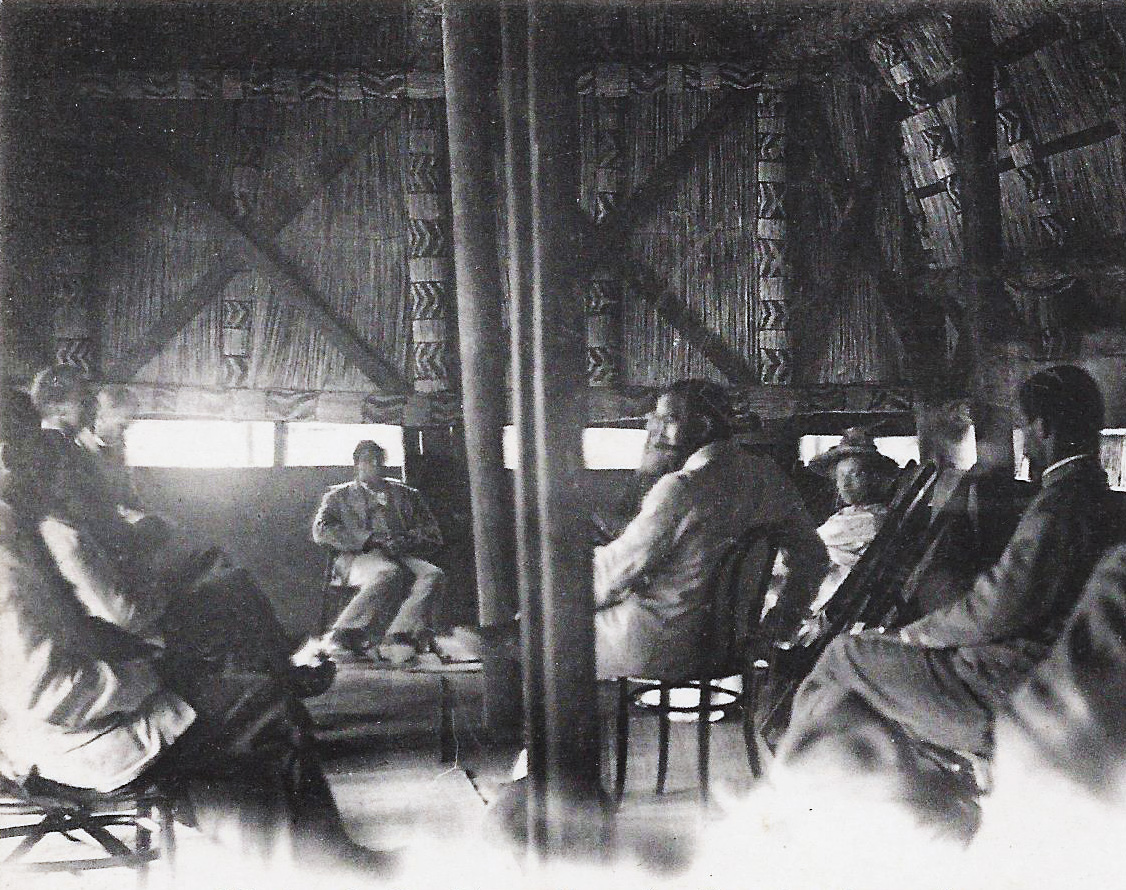
Lewanika meeting with French missionaries, c. 1886–87

Lewanika brought Barotseland, now part of Zambia, under British control in 1890, when he agreed with Cecil Rhodes for the region to become a protectorate under the British South Africa Company (BSAC). However, he felt deceived by the BSAC terms as they worked in practice, and he appealed, unsuccessfully, to the British Crown. Lewanika told Dr James Johnston how he had written to the British asking that his kingdom should be made a British Protectorate. He had waited years for a reply and then men had arrived with papers claiming that they had the power to make this happen. The King was reassured as the local missionary. Monsier Coillard, was his interpreter at the meeting and the King was reassured by Coillard's confidence in these men. Lewanika had been thankful that his wish had been granted and he had sent two enormous elephant ivory tusks as a present for Queen Victoria. Lewanika was incensed to find that the men were from a South African company and that the ivory tusks were not with Queen Victoria but as ornaments in the directors board room. Johnston assisted Lewanika in writing a letter of protest. Lewanika was to prove a great help to Johnston as he was able to command assistance for Johnston from nearby subordinate chiefs.

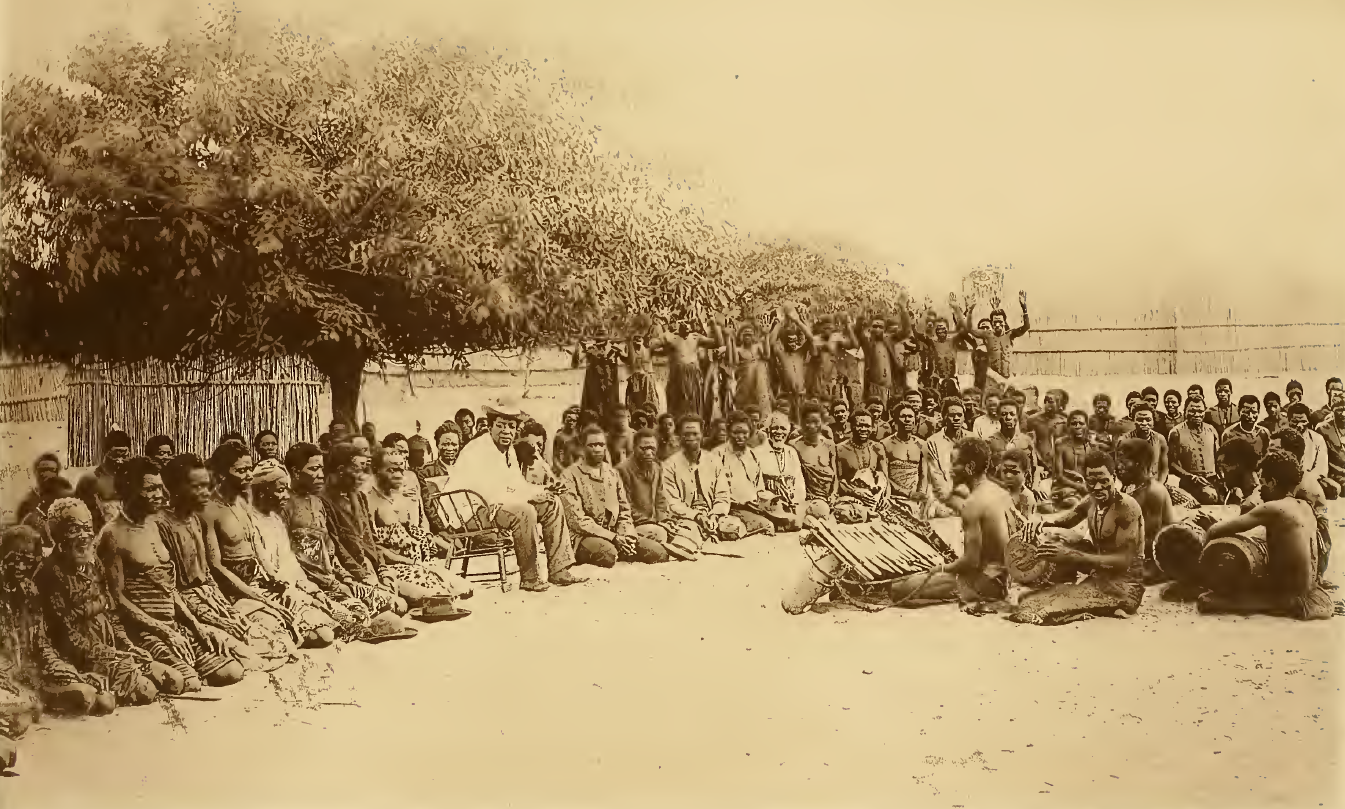
Lewanika holding court, c. 1893

In 1902, Lewanika visited London for the coronation of King Edward VII and Queen Alexandra, where he was treated with respect and had an audience with King Edward and an informal meeting with the Prince of Wales. When asked what he would discuss with the British sovereign, he said "When we kings meet we always have plenty to talk about".

Lubosi Lewanika died on 4 February 1916, with the cause of death recorded as uraemia.

== Family ==
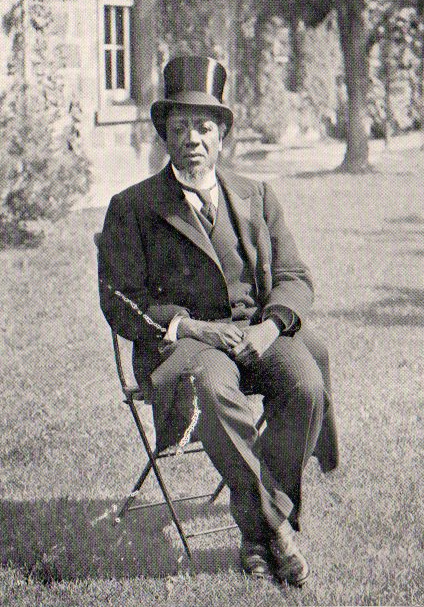
Lewanika visiting Europe in 1913

Lewanika's eldest son was named Litia, and succeeded as Yeta III on his father´s death. His third son Imwiko succeeded his brother in 1945, but died three years later and was succeeded by a third brother, Mwanawina III. On his death in 1968, a fourth brother Mbikusita reigned as Litunga from 1968 to 1977 as Lewanika II. A newspaper-article from 1902 mentioned two sons, Imasiku and Lubosi, who were educated in the UK at the time, and a son-in-law called Ishi-Kambai. One of his daughters worked as a teacher in his capital, and another was reported to have died while he was in the United Kingdom in 1902.

Lewanika's youngest daughter was Her Royal Highness Lundambuyu Dorcas Lewanika, who ruled as Mboajikana in Kalabo District, from 1959 to 1995. She has two children Maureen Mwangala Mutau and Martin Mwanangombe Mutau, however she fostered many children and orphans. Her Grand Children from Maureen are, Lundambuyu Mwenda, (Mrs Linda Kalinda), Notulu Mwenda (Mrs Notulu Lungu), Lungowe Mwenda (Mrs Lungowe Mwapela), Mwangala Mwenda, (Mrs Mwangala Lethbridge), Nyambe Mwenda (son). Her Great Grand Children from Maureen are Kelvin Muimanenwa Mulenga, Philip Kalinda, Sven Kalinda and Lundambuyu Mwapela. The Lewanika name continues to be used as part of a family name, for instance by Lewanika II's children Akashambatwa Mbikusita-Lewanika, a Zambian statesman and Inonge Mbikusita-Lewanika, a former ambassador of the Republic of Zambia in the United States.
