= Ministry of Education (Zambia) =

Government ministry of Zambia

The Ministry of Education is a ministry in Zambia. It is headed by the Minister of Education and oversees primary, secondary and tertiary education.

In 2015 the ministry was split, with the Ministry of Higher Education created to oversee tertiary and vocational education and the original ministry renamed the Ministry of General Education, with a remit to oversee primary and secondary education. After the 2021 general elections the two ministries were merged back to form a single Ministry of Education.

== List of ministers ==
| Minister | Party | Term start | Term end |
Minister of African Education
| Gabriel Musumbulwa | United Federal Party | 1959 | 1961 |
| Alfred Gondwe | Central Africa Party | 1961 | 1962 |
| Edson Mwamba | | 1962 | 1962 |
| Harry Nkumbula | Northern Rhodesian African National Congress | 1962 | 1964 |
Minister of Education
| John Mwanakatwe | United National Independence Party | 1964 | 1967 |
| Arthur Wina | United National Independence Party | 1967 | 1968 |
| Wesley Nyirenda | United National Independence Party | 1968 | |
| Fwanyanga Mulikita | United National Independence Party | 1973 | 1976 |
Minister of General Education
| David Mabumba | Patriotic Front | 2016 | 2020 |
| Dennis Wanchinga | Patriotic Front | 2020 | 2021 |
Minister of Education
| Douglas Syakalima | United Party for National Development | 2021 | 2026 |

=== Deputy ministers ===
| Deputy Minister | Party | Term start | Term end |
Parliamentary Secretary to the Minister of African Education
| Chiwala Banda | Northern Rhodesian African National Congress | 1962 | 1964 |
Parliamentary Secretary to the Minister of Education
| William Nkanza | United National Independence Party | 1964 | 1967 |
| Charles Thornicroft | United National Independence Party | 1964 | 1967 |
Minister of State for Technical Education
| Charles Thornicroft | United National Independence Party | 1967 | 1968 |
Parliamentary Secretary to the Minister of Education
| Miselo Kapika | United National Independence Party | 1968 | 1968 |
Deputy Minister of Education
| Clement Sinyinda | Movement for Multi-Party Democracy | 2007 | 2011 |
