= Senanga South =

National Assembly constituency in Zambia

Senanga South is a constituency of the National Assembly of Zambia. It was created in 2026 when Senanga constituency was split into two constituencies (Senanga North and Senanga South). It covers the southern part of Senanga District.

== List of MPs ==
Election year	MP	Party
2026	Likando Mufalali	United Party for National Development
