= Fwanyanga Mulikita =

Zambian politician

Speaker of the National Assembly
- In office 1988–1991
- Preceded by: Robinson Nabulyato
- Succeeded by: Robinson Nabulyato

Minister of Education
- In office 1973–1976

Minister of Power, Transport and Works
- In office 1971–1973

Minister of Labour and Social Services
- In office 1970–1971

Minister for Luapula Province
- In office 1969–1970

Member of the National Assembly for Mongu
- In office 1973–1978
- Preceded by: Mufaya Mumbuna

Nominated Member of the National Assembly
- In office 1969–1973

Permanent Representative of Zambia to the United Nations
- In office 1965–1966
- Succeeded by: Joseph Ben Mwemba

Personal details
- Born: 24 November 1928 Sefula, Northern Rhodesia
- Died: 2 September 1998 (aged 69) Lusaka, Zambia
- Party: UNIP
- Profession: Teacher, writer, civil servant

Fwanyanga Matale Mulikita (24 November 1928 – 2 September 1998) was a Zambian politician. He held several ministerial positions during the late 1960s and 1970s, and was later Speaker of the National Assembly

== Biography ==
Mulikita was born in Sefula in the Barotseland region of Northern Rhodesia in 1928. He attended Barotseland National School for his primary education, before moving onto Munali Secondary School in Lusaka. He then attended the University of Fort Hare in South Africa, earning a BA. After obtaining a scholarship, he studied at Stanford and Columbia University in the United States, earning an MA in psychology.

Upon returning to Northern Rhodesia, Mulikita worked as a teacher and an education officer. After taking a correspondence course in journalism he started writing short stories. Following independence in 1964 he was appointed Permanent Secretary at the Ministry of Education. He was later posted to the United Nations as the country's first Permanent Representative, before returning home to become Permanent Secretary at the Ministry of Foreign Affairs in 1967.

Following the 1968 general elections, Mulikita was appointed a member of the National Assembly by President Kenneth Kaunda, and was also made Minister for Luapula Province. He subsequently became Minister of Labour and Social Services in 1970 and Minister of Power, Transport and Works in 1971.

Mulikita was appointed Minister of Education in August 1973. In the December 1973 general elections Mulikita was elected to the National Assembly in the Mongu constituency. In 1976 he left the cabinet.

In 1988 Mulikita returned to the National Assembly after being elected as its Speaker. He held the post until being replaced by Robinson Nabulyato in 1991. In 1992 he became Chancellor of Copperbelt University. He died at the University Teaching Hospital in Lusaka on 2 September 1998.

== Personal life ==
Mulikita was married with four children and owned a farm at Chilanga.
