= Zambia's Scholarship Fund =

Zambia's Scholarship Fund (ZSF) is a 501(c)(3) non-profit organization based in Brigham City, Utah. ZSF works to improve education in some of the poorest areas of Zambia.

== History ==
The groundwork for ZSF began in 1998 through the efforts of founder Peggy Rogers. Rogers had seen the need for more educational opportunities in Zambia and began efforts to raise money to fund scholarship for high school students and high school graduates willing to attend a teachers college and begin teaching in rural schools. As funding allowed, more and more students were served. In the first ten years of operation, more than 1,000 high school and college students received scholarships and over 1,000 tons of books have been shipped from the United States to Zambian schools.

A tenth anniversary celebration in November 2009 featured a concert by country singer Emmylou Harris and a visit from the Zambian Ambassador to the United States, Inonge Mbikusita-Lewanika.

== Background ==
The government of the Republic of Zambia had to provide a free public education through the 8th grade. However, there are not enough available teachers for some rural areas. High schools, 9-12, are typically boarding schools requiring tuition. Teachers Colleges are two year programs, also typically boarding schools.

== Governance and operations ==
Peggy Rogers of Brigham City, Utah is the President. Brad McLaws of Park City, Utah is the Vice President. ZSF is governed by a Board of Directors. Officers and volunteers are not paid for their services and when traveling to Zambia for oversight, pay their own travel costs. The Fund employs two part-time coordinators on the ground in Zambia.
