= Senanga North =

National Assembly constituency in Zambia

Senanga North is a constituency of the National Assembly of Zambia. It was created in 2026 when Senanga constituency was split into two constituencies (Senanga North and Senanga South). It covers the northern part of Senanga District.

== List of MPs ==
Election year	MP	Party
2026	Brian Ndumba	United Party for National Development
