= Lozi =

Lozi may refer to:

- Lozi language
- Lozi people
- Lozi kingdom
- Lozi secessionism
- Lozi (Homeland), a Bantustan in South West Africa
- Bulozi Plain
