= Clement Sinyinda =

Zambian politician

Deputy Minister of Education
- In office 2007–2011

Member of the National Assembly for Senanga
- In office 2006–2011
- Preceded by: Walusiku Situmbeko
- Succeeded by: Likando Mufalali

Personal details
- Born: 2 January 1952 (age 73) Situnda, Senanga District, Barotseland, Northern Rhodesia
- Political party: Movement for Multi-Party Democracy
- Profession: Teacher, politician, and Barotseland independence activist

Clement Wainyae Sinyinda (born 2 January 1952) is a Zambian politician. He served as a member of the National Assembly for Senanga constituency between 2006 and 2011. He also held the post of Ngambela of the Barotse Royal Establishment, a Barotseland self-determination movement.

== Biography ==
Sinyinda was born in 1952 into a family from Situnda, a village in Senanga District. He worked as a teacher before entering politics. Prior to the 2006 general elections he was chosen as the Movement for Multi-Party Democracy candidate in the Senanga constituency and defeated the incumbent MP Walusiku Situmbeko with 70% of the vote and an 8,700 majority. In October 2007 he was appointed Deputy Minister of Education. He did not contest the 2011 general elections.

In January 2012, he was appointed Ngambela (Prime Minister) of Barotseland. However, he resigned from the post in November, claiming he had not been supported by the Litunga (King of Barotseland), Lubosi II Imwiko. In September 2013, he was arrested and charged with treason for allegedly supporting the secession of Western Province. After spending three months in custody, he was released in December after the government abandoned the prosecution.

He was elected the leader of the Barotse National Freedom Alliance in 2016.
