= Speaker of the National Assembly of Zambia =

Zambian political position

The speaker of the National Assembly of Zambia is a position established under Article 69(1) of the constitution. The speaker is elected by members of the Assembly from anyone eligible to be elected to the National Assembly, but cannot be a sitting member.

== History ==
The post of speaker was first created on 10 November 1948 when the Governor appointed Thomas Spurgeon Page to preside over the Legislative Council following the 1948 general elections. Previously the Governor had also held the position of the President of the Legislative Council.

The speakers of the Legislative Council were appointed by the Governor. Shortly after independence in 1964, appointed speaker of the renamed National Assembly Thomas Williams stepped down and was replaced by Wesley Nyirenda, who was the MP for Fort Jameson. Nyrienda remained a constituency MP. After Nyirenda resigned in 1968, speakers were appointed from outside the National Assembly by a vote of Assembly members.

== List of speakers ==
Name	Term start	Term end	Ref
Thomas Spurgeon Page	1948	1956	
Thomas Williams	1956	1964	
Wesley Nyirenda	1964	1968	
Robinson Nabulyato	1968	1988	
Fwanyanga Mulikita	1988	1991	
Robinson Nabulyato	1991	1998	
Amusaa Mwanamwambwa	1998	2011	
Patrick Matibini	2011	2021	
Nelly Mutti	2021	Present	
