= Robinson Nabulyato =

Zambian politician (1916–2004)

Speaker of the National Assembly
- In office 1991–1998
- Preceded by: Fwanyanga Mulikita
- Succeeded by: Amusaa Mwanamwambwa

Speaker of the National Assembly
- In office 1968–1988
- Preceded by: Wesley Nyirenda
- Succeeded by: Fwanyanga Mulikita

African Member of the Legislative Council
- In office 1954–1958

Personal details
- Born: 28 October 1916; Banamwaze, Northern Rhodesia
- Died: 12 September 2004 (aged 87); Lusaka, Zambia
- Profession: Teacher

Robinson Mwaakwe Nabulyato (28 October 1916 – 12 September 2004) was a Zambian politician. He served as a member of the Legislative Council of Northern Rhodesia between 1954 and 1958 and then Speaker of the National Assembly of Zambia from 1968 until 1988 and again from 1991 until 1998.

== Biography ==
Nabulyato was born in Banamwaze in 1916, and attended Methodist mission schools in Nanzila and Kafue. He later attended Chalimbana College, going on to work as a teacher. He joined the Northern Rhodesian Congress in 1948 and became its Secretary-General.

In 1954 Nabulyato became a member of the Legislative Council after being appointed as one of the four African members, representing Southern Province. He contested the South-Western seat in the 1959 general elections, running as an independent against Congress leader Harry Nkumbula, but was heavily defeated.

In 1968 Nabulyato was chosen as the Speaker of the National Assembly after Wesley Nyirenda had resigned to take up a ministerial position. He remained Speaker until retiring in 1988. However, three years later he was chosen as the Speaker for the first multi-party National Assembly since the early 1970s. He retired again in 1998. He died in the Kabulonga suburb of Lusaka on 12 September 2004.

== Honours and awards ==
Nabulyato was awarded the Order of the Grand Companion of Freedom in 1965. In 1972 he was made a Knight Grand Band of the Humane Order of African Redemption by Liberian President William R. Tolbert Jr. The University of Zambia gave him an honorary LL.D in October 1984.
