= 1991 Andorran local elections =

The 1991 Andorran local elections were held on 15 and 22 December. Voters elected the council members of the seven parishes of Andorra. Following the election, the communal councils elected the mayors and deputy mayors.

== Electoral system ==
Candidates were elected using a two-round plurality-at-large voting system with open lists. As parties were not legalised until 1993, all the lists were officially labelled as independent, although media classified them as government endorsed (if the list was supported by the outgoing government) or opposition (if candidates were part of the opposition). After the elections, the parish councils elected the consol major (mayor) and the cònsol menor (deputy mayor), which normally were the top candidates of the winning list.

In some parishes, votes may had been invalid if voters didn't choose for candidates from at every single quarter.

== Candidates ==
Candidates by parish. Names shown are top candidates:

- Canillo
  - Francesc Areny
  - Bonaventura Bonell
- Andorra la Vella
  - Lluís Viu Torres
  - Andreu Armengol Pascuet
- Sant Julià de Lòria
  - Ricard Tor Riba
- Escaldes-Engordany
  - Jacint Casal Mor

== Results ==
Turnout was 75.6%, 6.0 pp lower than in 1987. Candidates favourable to the Andorran Government won in 4 out of 7 parishes.

The second round only took place in Canillo.

=== Andorra la Vella ===
Party	Votes	%	Seats
Lluís Viu candidates	13,909	60.0	12
Andreu Armengol candidates	9,275	40.0	0
Blank votes	159	–	–
Invalid votes	44	–	–
Total	2,135	100	12
Registered votes/turnout	2,596	82.2	–
Source: BOPA

=== Sant Julià de Lòria ===
Party	Votes	%	Seats
Ricard Tor candidates	5,328	100	12
Blank votes	276	–	–
Invalid votes	42	–	–
Total	762	100	12
Registered votes/turnout	1,269	60.0	–
Source: La Vanguardia

=== Escaldes Engordany ===
Party	Votes	%	Seats
Jacint Casal candidates	11,076	100	12
Blank votes	358	–	–
Invalid votes	54	–	–
Total	1,335	100	12
Registered votes/turnout	1,984	67.3	–
Source: BOPA
