= Patrick Matibini =

Zambian politician, lawyer and former judge

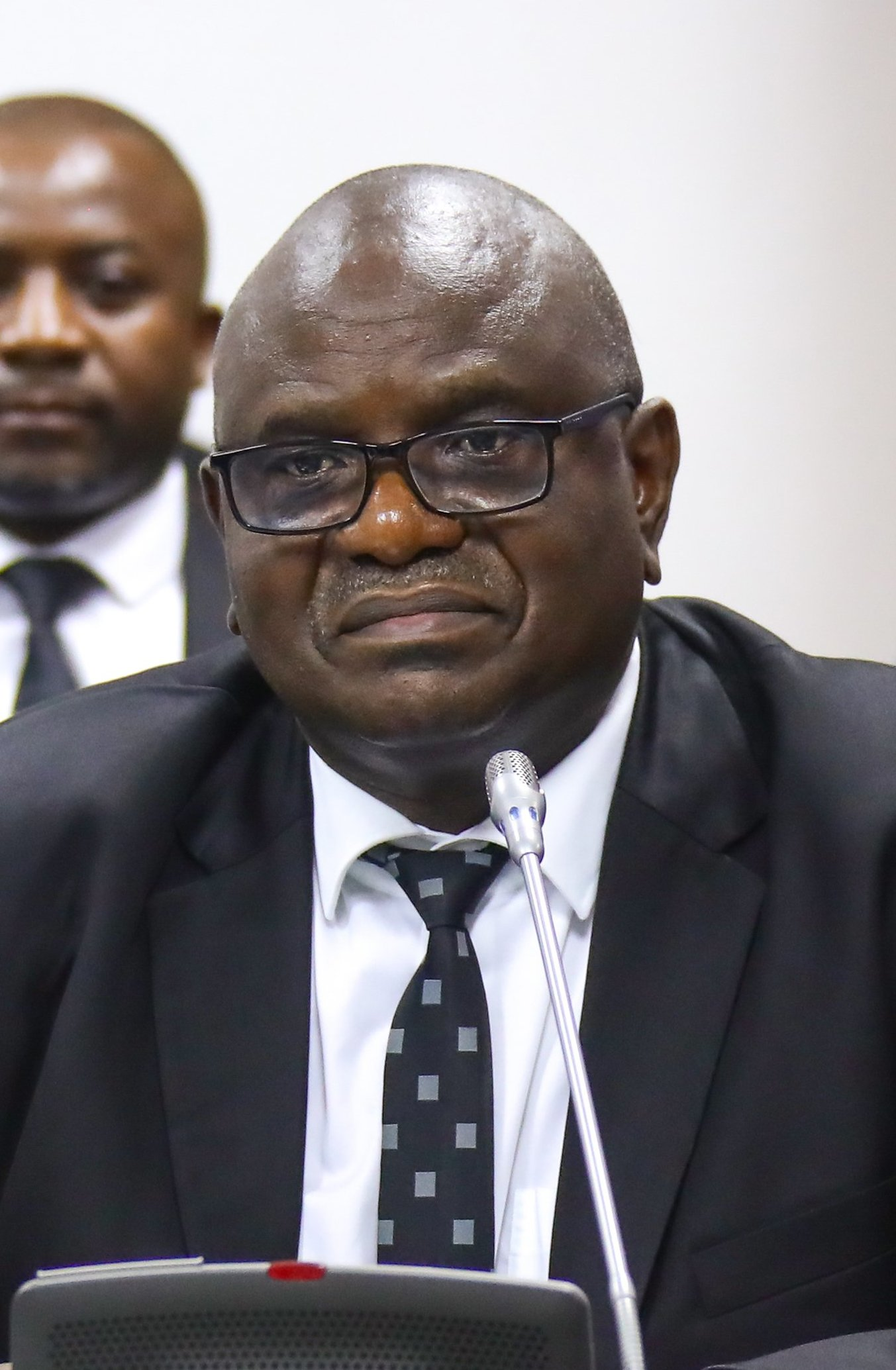

Speaker of the National Assembly
- In office 6 October 2011 – 3 September 2021
- Preceded by: Amusaa Mwanamwambwa
- Succeeded by: Nelly Mutti

Personal details
- Born: 20 July 1959 (age 67)
- Education: University of Zambia
- Profession: Lawyer, judge

Patrick Matibini (born 20 July 1959) is a Zambian politician, lawyer and former judge. He was Speaker of the National Assembly from 6 October 2011 until 3 September 2021.

== Career ==
Matibini was born on 20 July 1959. He studied at the University of Zambia, where he obtained both a Bachelor and master's degree in Law and subsequently a PhD. In June 2018, Matibini obtained a further BA in religious studies from Justo Mwale University College. Matibini has worked as a law professor at the University of Zambia since 1993. He is a lawyer by profession.

In 2002 Matibini worked with the Zambia Independent Media Association to draft three bills for the National Assembly, these being the Freedom of Information Bill, Independent Broadcasting Authority Bill, and Broadcasting Bill. In 2006 he published a book titled "The Struggle for Media Law Reforms in Zambia".

Matibini was a judge at the High Court of Zambia. He was made a State Counsel by President Rupiah Banda in 2009.

== Political career ==
The Patriotic Front (PF) nominated Matibini as Speaker of the National Assembly in October 2011. Zambian President Michael Sata appealed to MPs to accept Matibini and Mkhondo Lungu as Deputy Speaker, in return the PF would support a Movement for Multi-Party Democracy (MMD) candidate for chairperson for Committees. On 6 October Matibini received 78 votes, and opposition candidate Richard Kapita received 77 votes. Matibini was subsequently installed as President of the National Assembly. He succeeded Amusaa Mwanamwambwa. On 23 September 2016 Matibini was re-elected as Speaker, having run for the position unopposed.

On 13 June 2017, under Matibini's leadership, 48 MPs of the opposition United Party for National Development were suspended from the National Assembly for thirty days. Matibini accused them of "gross misconduct" after they did not attend the speech of the nation address of President Edgar Lungu in March. Matibini called upon the MPs to resign.

In wake of the 2021 Zambian general election, Matibini was succeeded as speaker by Nelly Mutti on 3 September 2021.

== Personal life ==
Matibini is married.
