= Thomas Williams (Northern Rhodesian speaker) =

Legislative Council Speaker of Northern Rhodesia

Speaker of the Legislative Council
- In office 1956–1964
- Preceded by: Thomas Spurgeon Page
- Succeeded by: Wesley Nyirenda

Personal details
- Born: 1893
- Died: 25 February 1967; Zambia

Sir Thomas Williams OBE (1893 – 25 February 1967) was the last Speaker of the Legislative Council of Northern Rhodesia.

== Biography ==
Born in 1893, Williams was educated at Normanton Grammar School in Yorkshire between 1905 and 1911, before attending the University of Leeds. He later moved to South Africa, becoming head of Johannesburg Teachers College. In 1935 he was appointed Honorary Professor of Education by the University of the Witwatersrand, a position he held until 1949.

After moving to Northern Rhodesia, Williams became Director of European Education in 1950. He held the post until 1955, when he was appointed Clerk of the Legislative Council. The following year he was made the Speaker after the retirement of Thomas Spurgeon Page. Having already received an OBE, Williams was knighted in the 1964 Birthday Honours. Following independence on 24 October 1964, he resigned as Speaker on 14 December, and was succeeded by Wesley Nyirenda.

Williams died in Zambia on 25 February 1967.
