= Lukulu =

Town in western Zambia

- Town
- Location within Zambia
- Coordinates: 14°24′30″S 23°16′0″E
- Country: Zambia
- Province: Western Province
- District: Lukulu District
- Time zone: UTC+2 (CAT)
- Website: www.lukulucouncil.gov.zm

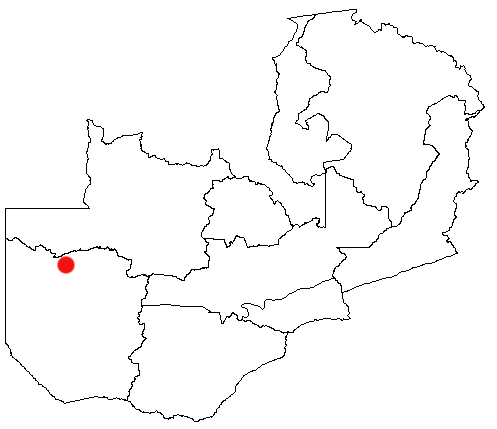
Location of Lukulu in Zambia

Lukulu is a market town in the Western Province of Zambia, on the Zambezi River, and headquarters of a district of the same name. It is located approximately 600 km (370 mi) from the capital of Zambia, Lusaka.

== Geography ==
Lukulu is at the north end of the Zambezi's Barotse Floodplain which at that point has not developed its full character, being narrower and less flat than it is further south. Every year between December and March, the river rises above the low banks of its main channel and spreads across the floodplain.

Access to the town is limited to only a few graded roads with traffic running through it from Kaoma town to Watopa town. Fish from the river provide most of the local diet, and some are exported to other parts of Zambia away from the river. The town has a Zambezi River water front and sandy beaches. There is a small pontoon ferry across the river, with a beach lying on the opposite bank of the main channel.

Lukulu is also home to a hospital, two markets and several schools. The rough roads are the only problem which stops trade and tourists from reaching the town.
