= 1991 Tampa mayoral election =

- March 5, 1991
Candidate	Sandra Freedman	Larry Smith
Party	Nonpartisan	Nonpartisan
Popular vote	25,448	8,590
Percentage	71.25%	24.05%
Mayor before election
Sandra Freedman
Nonpartisan
Elected mayor
Sandra Freedman
Nonpartisan

The 1991 Tampa mayoral election took place on March 5, 1991. Incumbent Mayor Sandra Freedman ran for re-election to a second full term. She was challenged by City Councilmember Larry Smith, whom she defeated in a landslide, winning 71 percent of the vote to Smith's 24 percent.

== Candidates ==
- Charles A. Eidson, businessman
- Sandra Freedman, incumbent mayor
- Larry Smith, city councilmember

== Results ==
1991 Tampa mayoral election
Party	Candidate	Votes	%
Nonpartisan	Sandra Freedman (inc.)	25,448	71.25%
Nonpartisan	Larry Smith	8,590	24.05%
Nonpartisan	Charles A. Eidson	1,678	4.70%
Total votes		35,716	100.00%
