= Tatila Akufuna =

Tatila Akufuna (died 1887) was a Litunga, Chief of the Lozi people of Barotseland in Africa, but he ruled for a very short time and his power was weak. His full title was Mulena Yomuhulu Mbumu wa Litunga.

Father of Akufuna was Chief Imbua Mulumbwa.

Before he became a king of Lozi, Akufuna was a High Chief of Lukwakwa. In September 1884 Akufuna began to rule, but was deposed by great king Lewanika in 1885.

Akufuna was killed by Mulanziana Sitwala.

== See also ==
- List of monarchs who lost their thrones in the 19th century
- Lewanika
