= 1991 Azerbaijani presidential election =

- 8 September 1991
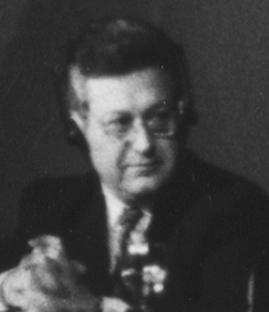
Nominee	Ayaz Mutalibov
Party	Communist Party
Popular vote	3,275,837
Percentage	98.53%
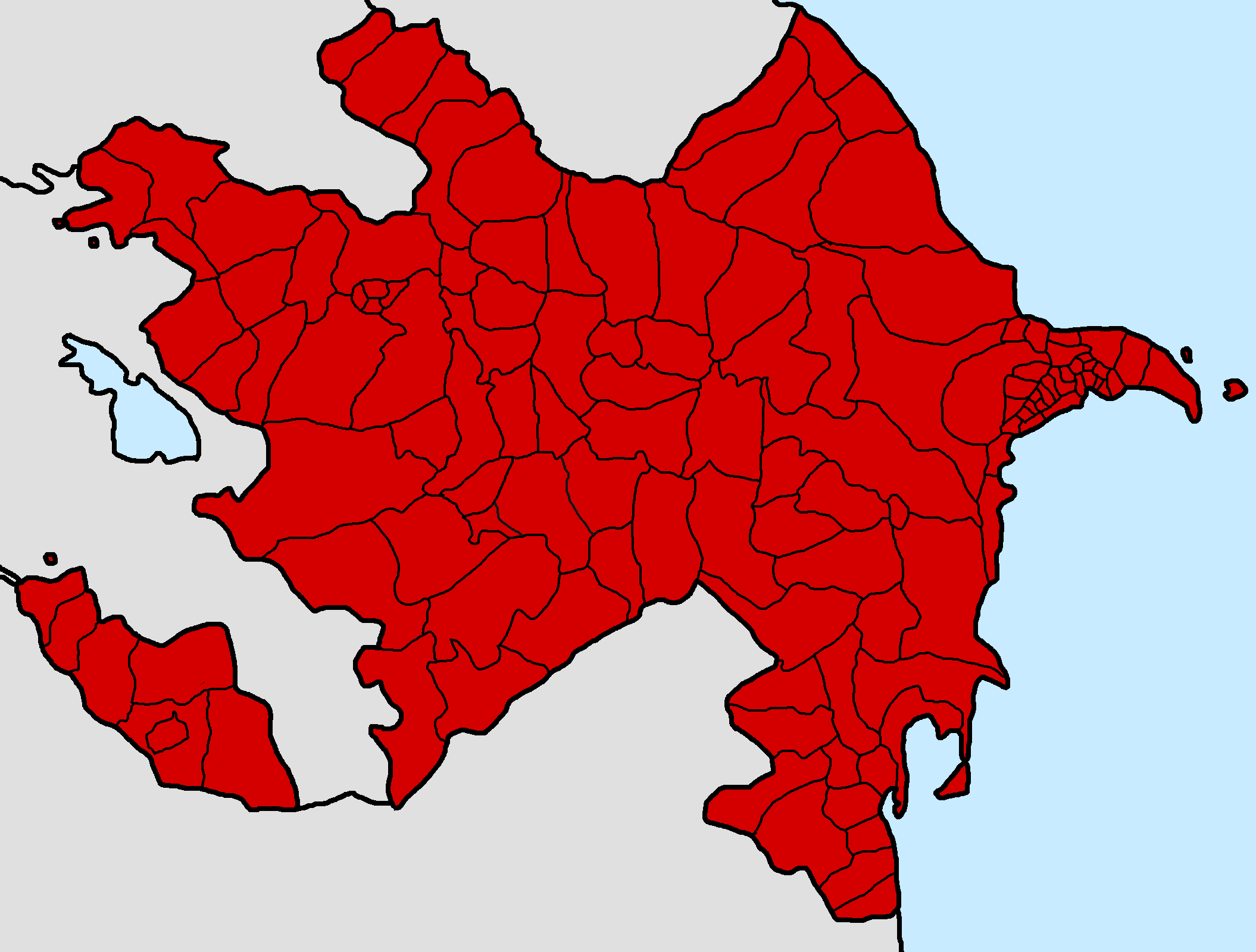
- Result by constituency
President before election
Ayaz Mutalibov
Communist Party
Elected President
Ayaz Mutalibov
Communist Party

Presidential elections were held for the first time in Azerbaijan on 8 September 1991. The only candidate was the incumbent president, Ayaz Mutalibov of the Communist Party of Azerbaijan, who won with 99% of the vote, with turnout reported to be 86%.

== Results ==
Candidate	Party	Votes	%
Ayaz Mutalibov	Communist Party of Azerbaijan	3,275,837	98.53
Against		48,866	1.47
Total		3,324,703	100.00
Valid votes		3,324,703	99.99
Invalid/blank votes		460	0.01
Total votes		3,325,163	100.00
Registered voters/turnout		3,879,988	85.70
Source: Nohlen et al.
