= Likando Kalaluka =

Zambian legal practitioner

Attorney General
- In office 8 April 2015 – 24 August 2021
- President: Edgar Lungu
- Preceded by: Musa Mwenye

Personal details
- Born: Likando Kalaluka
- Profession: Legal Practitioner

Likando Kalaluka, State Counsel, is a Zambian legal practitioner who served as Attorney General under the government headed by President Edgar Lungu. He is a lawyer and advocate of the High Court for Zambia. Kalaluka is currently serving as the Zambia Institute of Advanced Legal Education (ZIALE) board chairman. As Attorney General, Kalaluka was an assistant cabinet member and assistant legal adviser to the Zambian Government.

== Early life and education ==
Kalaluka went to Kabulonga Secondary School where he completed his Grade 12 in 1994. He later studied for his Bachelor of Laws (LLB) degree at the University of Zambia (UNZA) graduating in 2001. At UNZA, Kalaluka was a students' union leader; he was the treasurer of the students' body.

In 2003, Kalaluka entered the Zambia Institute of Advanced Legal Education in preparation for the Legal Practitioners Qualification Examination (LPQE), which is a prerequisite postgraduate certificate for one to practice law in Zambia.

In 2004, Kalaluka was admitted to the bar after passing the LQPE.

In 2012, he graduated from the first ever class of the LLM in International and Comparative Disability Law and Policy at National University of Ireland Galway's School of Law.

== Legal career ==
He was legal practitioner and partner in the law firm Ellis & Co, Lusaka, Zambia, where he specialised in litigation, business advisory and general counsel. As a practising lawyer, he played various roles as an official, lawyer and advisor in various issues concerning social development.

Prior to his nomination as Attorney general, Kalaluka was the Honorary Secretary of the Law Association of Zambia, a position that made him CEO. He also worked as Legal Advisor for Plan International Zambia.

In mid-March 2015, President Edgar Lungu nominated Kalaluka as Attorney General pending ratification by the parliament of Zambia. On 25 March 2015, parliament unanimously ratified the presidential appointment of Kalaluka as Attorney General. On 8 April 2015, President Edgar Lungu swore him in as the Attorney General.

Currently, Kalaluka is a member of the Law Association of Zambia. After two years of law practice, Kalaluka was elected to the Council of the Law Association of Zambia. He held the position for about 9 years.

The title of State Counsel was automatically conferred on Likando kalaluka when he was appointed Attorney General, because by virtue of office as the AG, Kalaluka is the leader of the Zambian Bar.

== Prominent legal cases ==
Likando Kalaluka SC, as Attorney general, played a pivotal role in the 2016 Presidential Election Petition Case brought to the high court and the Constitutional Court in Lusaka by the losing United Party for National Development UPND candidate Hakainde Hichilema challenging the results which declared Edgar Lungu as winner. As Attorney General, he led the defence of Lungu's victory. Hakainde's challenge failed before the courts and Lungu was sworn in as Zambia's legitimately elected president.
