= 1991 Louisiana lieutenant gubernatorial election =

- October 19, 1991 (first round); November 16, 1991 (runoff)

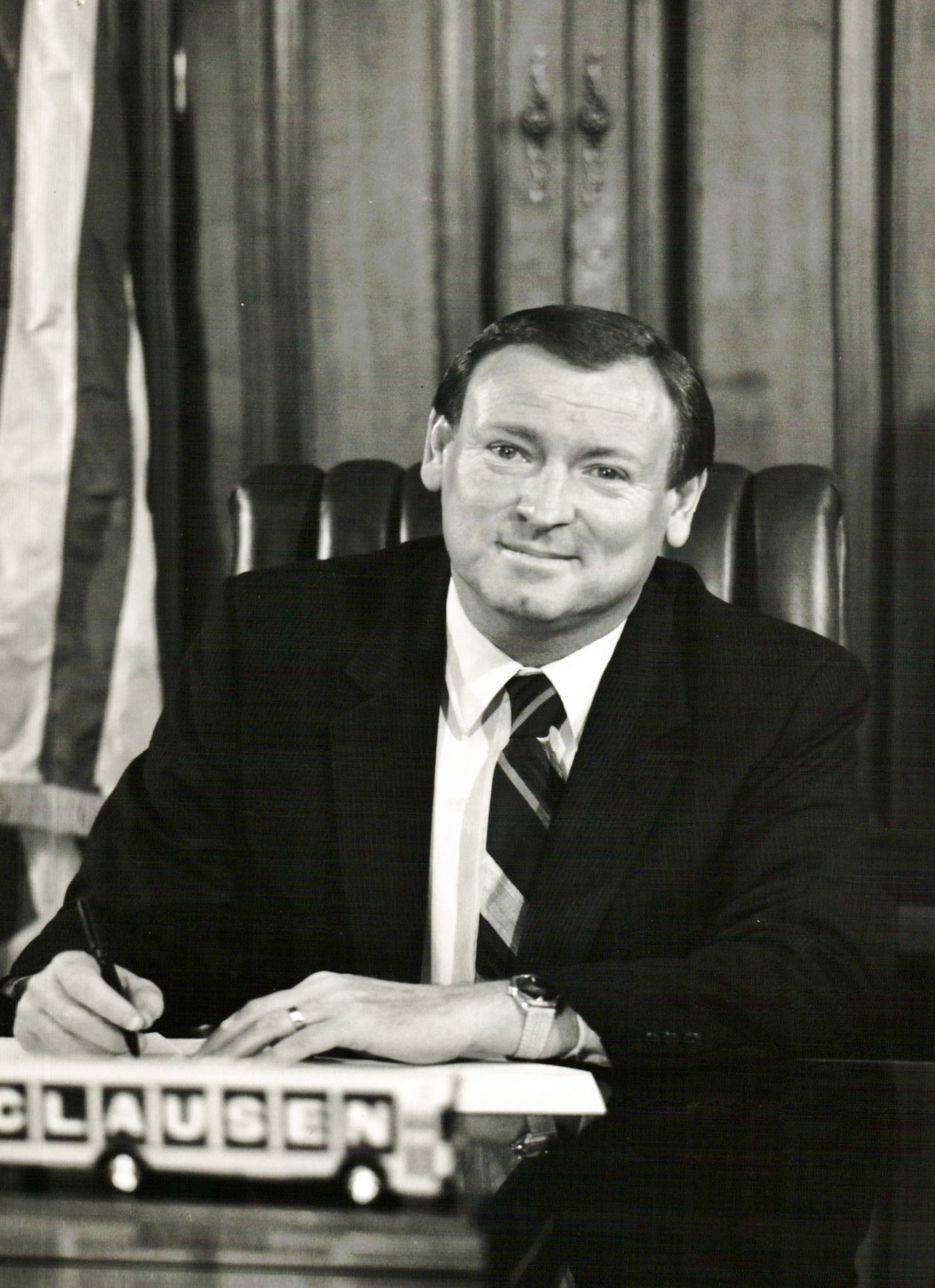
Candidate	Melinda Schwegmann	Paul Hardy	Thomas Clausen
Party	Democratic	Republican	Democratic
First round	624,371; 42.86%	620,199; 42.57%	115,921; 7.96%
Runoff	1,009,026; 59.27%	693,412; 40.73%	Eliminated
Lieutenant Governor before election
Paul Hardy
Republican
Elected Lieutenant Governor
Melinda Schwegmann
Democratic

The 1991 Louisiana lieutenant gubernatorial election was held on November 16, 1991, in order to elect the lieutenant governor of Louisiana. Democratic candidate Melinda Schwegmann defeated incumbent Republican lieutenant governor Paul Hardy in the Runoff election, thereby becoming the first woman to have been elected lieutenant governor of the U.S. state of Louisiana.

== Background ==
Elections in Louisiana—with the exception of U.S. presidential elections—follow a variation of the open primary system called the jungle primary or the nonpartisan blanket primary. Candidates of any and all parties are listed on one ballot; voters need not limit themselves to the candidates of one party. Unless one candidate takes more than 50% of the vote in the first round, a run-off election is then held between the top two candidates, who may in fact be members of the same party. Texas uses this same format for its special elections. In this election, the first round of voting was held on October 19, 1991. The runoff was held on November 16, 1991.

== Primary election ==
On election day, October 19, 1991, incumbent Democratic candidate Melinda Schwegmann and incumbent Republican lieutenant governor Paul Hardy received the most votes and thus advanced to a runoff election on November 16.

=== Results ===
Louisiana lieutenant gubernatorial primary election, 1991
Party	Candidate	Votes	%
Democratic	Melinda Schwegmann	624,371	42.86
Republican	Paul Hardy (incumbent)	620,199	42.57
Democratic	Thomas Clausen	115,921	7.96
Democratic	James Ellis Richardson	51,451	3.53
Democratic	Gary M. Wiltz	45,012	3.08
Total votes		1,456,954	100.00

== Runoff election ==
On election day, November 16, 1991, Democratic candidate Melinda Schwegmann defeated incumbent Republican lieutenant governor Paul Hardy by a margin of 315,614 votes, thereby gaining Democratic control over the office of lieutenant governor. Schwegmann was sworn in as the 49th Lieutenant Governor of Louisiana on January 3, 1992.

=== Results ===
Louisiana lieutenant gubernatorial runoff election, 1991
Party	Candidate	Votes	%
Democratic	Melinda Schwegmann	1,009,026	59.27
Republican	Paul Hardy (incumbent)	693,412	40.73
Total votes		1,702,438	100.00
Democratic gain from Republican			
