= 1969 Zambian constitutional referendum =

- 17 June 1969

Results
Choice	Votes	%
Yes	904,337	85.02%
No	159,348	14.98%
Valid votes	1,063,685	96.40%
Invalid or blank votes	39,667	3.60%
Total votes	1,103,352	100.00%
Registered voters/turnout	1,587,966	69.48%

A constitutional referendum was held in Zambia on 17 June 1969. The referendum proposed amending the constitution to remove the requirement for future amendments of clauses protecting fundamental rights to go to a public referendum, and instead require only a two-thirds majority in the National Assembly. The referendum was passed with 85% voting in favour of the change. Voter turnout was 69.5%.

== Results ==
Choice	Votes	%
For	904,337	85.02
Against	159,348	14.98
Invalid/blank votes	39,667	3.60
Total	1,103,352	100
Registered voters/turnout	1,587,966	69.48
Source: African Elections Database
