= 1991 Sioux Falls mayoral election =

- June 18, 1991

Candidate	Jack White	Pam Nelson
Party	Nonpartisan	Nonpartisan
Popular vote	11,178	8,697
Percentage	51.88%	40.36%
Mayor before election
Jack White
Nonpartisan
Elected mayor
Jack White
Nonpartisan

The 1991 Sioux Falls mayoral election took place on June 18, 1991. Incumbent Mayor Jack White ran for re-election to a second term. He was challenged by State Senator Pam Nelson and several other candidates. White defeated Nelson by a wide margin in the primary election, winning 52 percent of the vote to Nelson's 40 percent, eliminating the need for runoff.

This was the last election conducted prior to voters' adoption of mayor–council government in 1994, which shortened mayoral terms to four years.

== Candidates ==
- Jack White, incumbent Mayor
- Pam Nelson, State Senator
- Carl A. Mashek, historical researcher
- Alan Barto, former teacher and mail carrier
- Robert "Skippy" Blechinger, perennial candidate

== Results ==
1991 Sioux Falls mayoral primary election
Party	Candidate	Votes	%
Nonpartisan	Jack White (inc.)	11,178	51.88%
Nonpartisan	Pam Nelson	8,697	40.36%
Nonpartisan	Carol A. Mashek	1,187	5.51%
Nonpartisan	Alan Barto	244	1.13%
Nonpartisan	Bob "Skippy" Blechinger	241	1.12%
Total votes		21,547	100.00%
