= Agenda for Zambia =

Defunct political party in Zambia

The Agenda for Zambia (AZ) was a political party in Zambia active between 1996 and 2002. The party was associated with Akashambatwa Mbikusita-Lewanika and his sister Inonge Mbikusita-Lewanika, and drew most of its support from Western Province.

== History ==
The party was established in October 1996, shortly before the 1996 general elections. Akashambatwa Mbikusita-Lewanika was the party's presidential candidate, finishing fourth out of five candidates with 5% of the vote. In the parliamentary elections the party nominated eleven candidates, receiving 1.5% of the vote and winning two seats in the National Assembly amidst a United National Independence Party boycott.

Mbikusita-Lewanika's sister Inonge was the party's presidential candidate in the 2001 general elections, and finished eleventh in a field of 12 candidates with 0.6% of the vote. In the parliamentary elections the party's vote share was just 0.16%, resulting in it losing both seats.

In 2002 the party merged into the Movement for Multi-Party Democracy.
