= Wesley Nyirenda =

1st Speaker of the National Assembly of Zambia

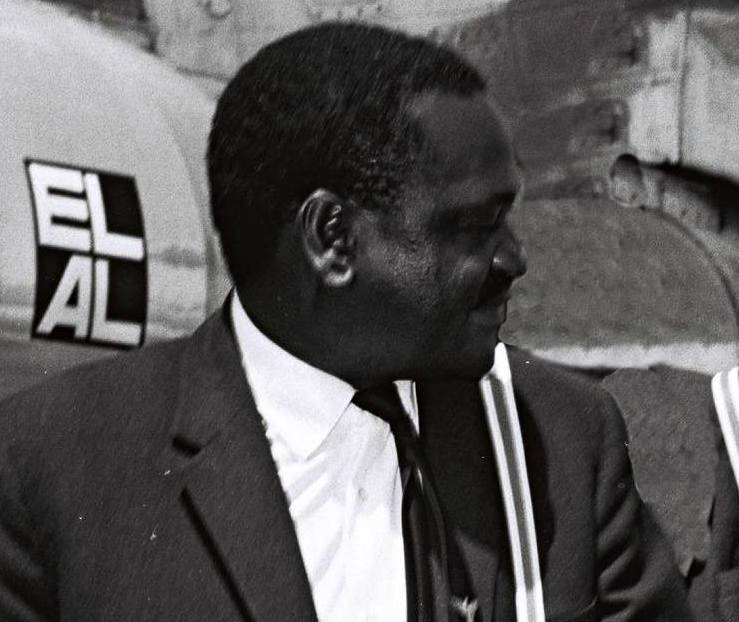
- Nyirenda after his arrival at Lod airport for the inauguration of the new Knesset Building in 1966.

1st Speaker of the National Assembly
- In office 1964–1968
- President: Kenneth Kaunda
- Preceded by: Thomas Williams
- Succeeded by: Robinson Nabulyato

Member of the National Assembly for Fort Jameson
- In office 1964–1973
- President: Kenneth Kaunda
- Preceded by: Thomas Williams
- Succeeded by: Josiah Lungu

Personal details
- Born: Wesley Pillsbury Nyirenda; 23 January 1924
- Died: 7 July 1993 (aged 69)

Pillsbury Wesley Nyirenda was a Zambian politician and the first elected Speaker of the National Assembly of Zambia after the it was renamed from Legislative Council of Northern Rhodesia. He also as a member of parliament for Fort Jameson from 1964 to 1973 before the Seat was abolished and split into Chipata East, Chipata North and Chipata West. He was also the indigenous Zambian to be President of NOCZ taking over from George Crane in 1968.
