= Yeta III =

Litunga of Barotseland
- Reign: 8 March 1916 – 20 June 1945
- Coronation: 13 March 1916
- Predecessor: Lewanika; Mokamba (regent)
- Successor: Imwiko
- Born: c. 1871; Likapai, Barotseland
- Died: after 1945; Barotseland?
- Burial: Mulumbo, Mongu District, Western Province, Zambia
- Spouse: Queen Kumayo
- Issue among others: Ilute Yeta IV; Nakatindi Yeta Nganga
- Father: King Lewanika
- Mother: Queen Ma-Litia

Yeta III CBE (born Litia) was Litunga (King) of Barotseland, of the Lozi people in what is now Western Zambia, from 1916 to 1945.

== Family ==
Yeta was born as Prince Litia Malikana. The parents of Yeta were King Lewanika and Queen Ma-Litia.

Yeta married a woman called Kumayo who became his consort at Sefula Church in 1892. They were baptized together.

Later Yeta married another woman.

His children were:

- Son
- Prince Daniel Akafuna Yeta – named after king Akafuna Tatila
- Prince Edward Kaluwe Yeta – father of Prince Godwin Mando Kaluwe Yeta
- Prince Richard Nganga Yeta
- Princess Mareta Mulima
- Princess Elizabeth Inonge Yeta III
- Princess
- Princess Nakatindi
- King Ilute

== Reign ==
Yeta was enthroned at Lealui on 13 March 1916, and abolished the traditional system of corvee, the last vestige of slavery on 1 April 1925.

Yeta attended the coronation of King George VI and Queen Elizabeth at Westminster Abbey in London, but experienced a severe stroke which caused partial paralysis and loss of speech in early 1939. Yeta's secretary wrote: "The Coronation was the greatest event we ever saw or will ever see in our lives again. Nobody could think that he is really on earth when seeing the Coronation Procession, but that he is either dreaming or is in Paradise."

He abdicated in favour of his younger brother Imwiko.

== See also ==
- Litunga
- Nyame, divine ancestor of Lozi kings
