= 1991 Burgenland state election =

State-level election in Austria

The Burgenland state election of 1991 was held in the Austrian state of Burgenland on 23 June 1991.

Party	Votes in %	Seats	Change	Reference
Social Democratic Party of Austria (SPÖ)	48.1%	17	+0	
Austrian People's Party (ÖVP)	38.2%	15	-1	
Freedom Party of Austria (FPÖ)	9.7%	4	+1	
The Greens – The Green Alternative (Grüne)	3.3%	0	+0	
Others	0.6%	0	+0	

Popular Vote
SPÖ	48.14%
ÖVP	38.19%
FPÖ	9.74%
GAL	3.35%
Other	0.58%
