= 1991 Liechtenstein referendum =

- 22 September 1991

Amendments to a law on noise protection
For	20.34%
Against	79.66%

Introducing a five-day week for schools
For	34.71%
Against	65.29%

Two referendums were held in Liechtenstein on 22 September 1991. Voters were asked whether they approved of amendments to a law on noise protection, as well as introducing a five-day week at schools. Both proposals were rejected, by around 80% and 65% of the voters, respectively.

== Results ==
=== Noise protection law ===
Choice	Votes	%
For	1,903	20.3
Against	7,455	79.7
Invalid/blank votes	198	–
Total	9,556	100
Registered voters/turnout	13,816	69.2
Source: Nohlen & Stöver

=== Five-day week for schools ===
Choice	Votes	%
For	3,226	34.7
Against	6,068	65.3
Invalid/blank votes	262	–
Total	9,556	100
Registered voters/turnout	13,816	69.2
Source: Nohlen & Stöver
