= 1987 Andorran local elections =

The 1987 Andorran local elections were held on 13 and 20 December. Voters elected the council members of the seven parishes of Andorra. Following the election, the communal councils elected the mayors and deputy mayors.

== Electoral system ==
Candidates were elected using a two-round plurality-at-large voting system with open lists. As parties were not legalised until 1993, all the lists were officially labelled as independent, although media classified them as government endorsed (if the list was supported by the outgoing government) or opposition (if candidates were part of the opposition). After the elections, the parish councils elected the consol major (mayor) and the cònsol menor (deputy mayor), which normally were the top candidates of the winning list.

== Candidates ==
Candidates by parish. The top candidates are listed for each list:

- Canillo
  - Government endorsed: Xavier Escribà, Miquel Naudi
- Encamp
  - Government endorsed: Josep Maria Mas
  - Opposition: Miquel Alís, Josep Dalleres
- Ordino
  - Government endorsed: Pere Babi, Albert Pujal
  - Opposition: Julià Vila, Enric Dolsa
- La Massana
  - Government endorsed: unknown
  - Opposition: unknown
- Andorra la Vella
  - Government endorsed: Manuel Pons, Antoni Cerqueda
  - Opposition: Jaume Bartomeu, Joan Arajol
- Sant Julià de Lòria
  - Government endorsed: Ricard Tor, Joan Santamaria
  - Opposition: Joan Travesset, Maria Rosa Fàbrega
- Escaldes-Engordany
  - Government endorsed: Josep Maria Beal
  - Opposition: Ignasi Maestre

== Results ==
Turnout was 81.6%, 3.9 pp higher than in the previous election. In Andorra la Vella and Escaldes-Engordany, turnout was around 90%. In Canillo, it was around 60%.

In all parishes (but Encamp) the government endorsed lists won the election. A second round was held in Encamp, as only 9 out of 10 seats were filled in the first round. An opposition councillor was finally elected in the second round. Results by parish:

Parish	Winning list
Canillo	Xavier Escribà (government endorsed)
Encamp	Miquel Alís (opposition)
Ordino	Pere Babi (government endorsed)
La Massana	(government endorsed)
Andorra la Vella	Manuel Pons (government endorsed)
Sant Julià de Lòria	Ricard Tor (government endorsed)
Escaldes-Engordany	José María Beal (government endorsed)
