= Order of Council =

Form of legislation in the United Kingdom

An Order of Council is a form of legislation in the United Kingdom. It is made by the Lords of the Privy Council (in practice, ministers of the Crown).

Orders of Council differ from Orders in Council in that, while Orders in Council are orders made by the monarch meeting with the Privy Council, Orders of Council are made by the Privy Council in its own right and without requiring the monarch's approval. The preamble of all Orders of Council states that the order was made at a meeting of the council held in Whitehall; however, in practice they are all approved through correspondence, and no meeting is actually held.

Depending on the subject, Orders of Council can be either made under prerogative powers, or under authority granted by an Act of Parliament (and so are delegated legislation). An example of an order made in exercise of prerogative powers would be one approving changes to the bylaws of a chartered institution. Orders made under statute generally relate to:

- Regulation of the medical and veterinary professions – Orders concerning the constitution, powers and rules of the General Medical Council, Nursing and Midwifery Council, General Dental Council, General Optical Council, Health Professions Council and the Council of the Royal College of Veterinary Surgeons.
- Regulation of the higher education sector – Orders regarding the constitutions of universities.

Lists of Orders of Council made since 2000 can be found on the Privy Council Office website.
