= Abrogatio =

Term in Roman law

In Roman law, abrogatio is in general an annulment of a law or legal procedure.

Abrogatio or annulment of a citizen's rights was a necessary preliminary before he was sent into exile.

== Abrogatio legis ==
Abrogatio legis was the total repeal of a law. For example, the Lex Canuleia was an abrogation of the earlier law of the Twelve Tables that prohibited marriage between a patrician and a plebeian. A partial repeal of a law was either derogatio or exrogatio legis. Originally, the comitia centuriata ("centuriate assembly") had to abrogate a law. When Sulla became dictator, all the laws passed by his opponents (the populares) were abrogated.

== Abrogatio imperii ==
Abrogatio imperii was the annulment of a magistrate's imperium (power or right to command). It was essentially the removal of a magistrate from office, and was "extremely rare". Originally, the abrogatio imperii would have required the tribal assembly to pass a plebiscite, as was the case when a magistrate's imperium was extended past his elected term (prorogatio). Abrogatio was a preliminary step to prosecuting a magistrate, who was immune to prosecution during his term in office, and was usually initiated by a tribune of the plebs.

Livy records three abrogationes from 217 to 204 BC, during the Second Punic War. Each case was brought by a tribune against a magistrate whose strategy in the field had met with objections at Rome, even though no military defeats or setbacks resulted. Personal rivalries seem to have among the motives. In 217, the tribune Marcus Metilius threatened to abrogate the command of Quintus Fabius Maximus Verrucosus, due to the stalling tactics which earned him the nickname Cunctator ("the Delayer"). Political resistance from the senate presumably caused Metilius to back down. In 209, the tribune Publicius Bibulus proposed the abrogation of the command held by Marcus Claudius Marcellus, who had not led his troops out even though Hannibal was at the time moving freely about Italy. In 204, the elderly Fabius Maximus urged the tribunes to abrogate the command of Scipio on the ostensible grounds that he had left his assigned province of Sicily without authorization from the senate; in actuality, his intention seems to have been to take advantage of any damage to Scipio's reputation from his association with the disreputable Pleminius, with the goal of thwarting Scipio's overall strategy of invading Africa in order to lure Hannibal out of Italy. None of these adrogationes succeeded.
