= Lukulu District =

Coordinates: 14°20′S 23°10′E

- District
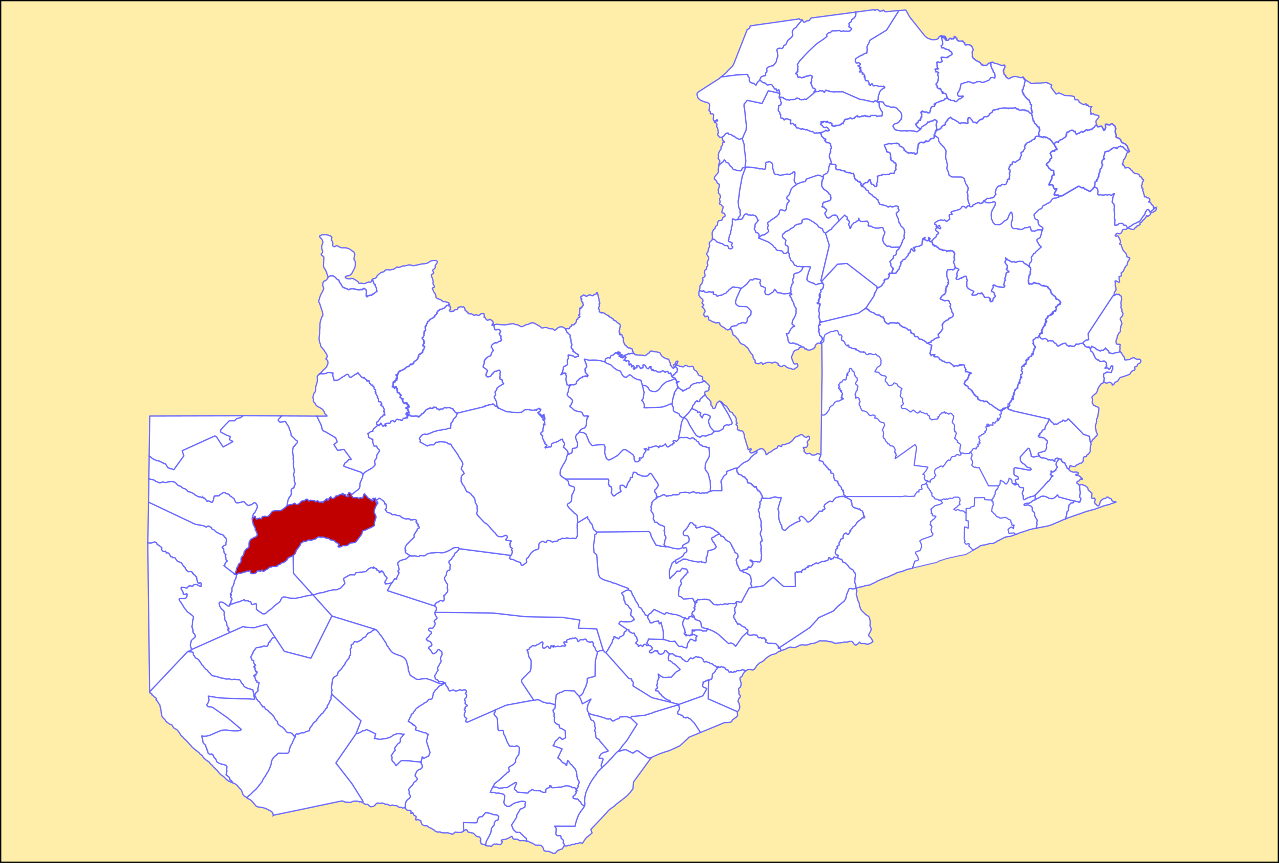
- District location in Zambia
- Country: Zambia
- Province: Western Province
- Capital: Lukulu

Area
  - Total: 9,329.1 km^{2} (3,602.0 sq mi)

Population (2022)
  - Total: 96,290
  - Density: 10.32/km^{2} (26.73/sq mi)
- Time zone: UTC+2 (CAT)

Lukulu District is a district of Zambia, located in Western Province. The capital lies at Lukulu. As of the 2022 Zambian Census, the district had a population of 96,290 people.
