= François Coillard =

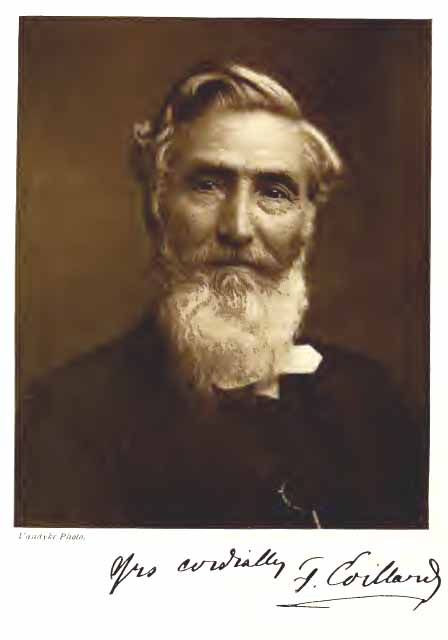

François Coillard (17 July 1834 in Asnières-les-Bourges, Cher, France – 27 May 1904 in Lealui, Barotseland, Northern Rhodesia) was a French missionary who worked for the Paris Evangelical Missionary Society in southern Africa.

== Early life and education ==
Coillard was the youngest of the seven children of François Coillard and his wife Madeleine. Both parents were of Huguenot descent. In 1836, Coillard’s father died, leaving behind a nearly destitute widow.

Coillard enrolled in the Protestant School at Asnières at the age of 15 and later attended Strasbourg University. He offered himself in 1854 to the Paris Evangelical Missionary Society (PEMS or, in French, Société des Missions Evangéliques de Paris). He trained under Eugène Casalis, a veteran southern African missionary, and in 1857 was ordained at the Oratoire in Paris. His first posting was to the independent kingdom of Basutoland (present-day Lesotho), where the PEMS had been established since 1833. When Coillard reached Cape Town on 6 November 1857, it was the eve of a war between Basutoland and the Boer republic of the Orange Free State; during the war, the French mission stations in Basutoland were destroyed. Coillard’s first task was to open a new station at Leribe.

== Career ==
In 1865 Basutoland became involved in disputes with its neighbouring Boer nations of Natal and the Orange Free State. Coillard assisted in fruitful negotiations between local Basuto chiefs and Theophilus Shepstone, Natal's secretary for native affairs. In April 1866, Boer invaders from the Orange Free State forced the evacuation of Leribé mission. Coillard moved to Natal, where he assisted American missionaries. He occupied a vacant mission station there until Britain proclaimed a protectorate over Basutoland in 1868. Coillard then returned to Leribé.

Robert Moffat at Kuruman strongly encouraged Coillard to move north. Also, Basutoland churches proposed a mission by their own evangelists to peoples across the Limpopo River, who spoke Sotho-related languages. After the Boer government of Transvaal Republic turned back two Sotho expeditions, Coillard was asked to lead a third attempt. The new party consisted of Christina Coillard, four Basuto evangelists, and Elise Coillard (a niece to Coillard). When they arrived in Pretoria in May 1877, they found that the British crown had annexed the Transvaal Republic, which was now ruled under the governorship of Theophilus Shepstone.

After the missionaries crossed the Limpopo River, Shona chiefs would not welcome the group; instead, the party was forced to go to Bulawayo, the headquarters of King Lobengula of the Ndebele. Lobengula prohibited the missionaries from preaching in his domains, so Coillard led the group southwest to the territory of Khama III, a Christian Tswana ruler. Khama suggested that the group could try their luck with Barotseland (the Lozi kingdom), north of the Zambezi River, where a Sotho-related language was spoken. The missionaries failed to arrange a meeting with the recently elected Lozi king, but Coillard convinced the PEMS to support an attempt to establish mission stations in Barotseland. This plan was delayed by a trip Coillard made to Europe in 1880–82 and other complications in Basutoland.

Coillard finally mounted his expedition to Barotseland in 1884. The country was in turmoil with Lewanika, the former king, exiled and a usurper on the throne. Soon after Coillard established friendly relations with the usurper, another revolution brought Lewanika back to power. Coillard’s credibility was compromised by his initial diplomacy with the usurper, and it was only in March 1886 that he was received by Lewanika at Lealui, the capital of the kingdom.

From 1886 until 1891 Coillard worked to establish strong mission stations at various locations in Barotseland: Sesheke, Lealui, and Sefula. In an attempt to strengthen his grip on the kingship, Lewanika enlisted Coillard's assistance in negotiating for a British protectorate to be declared over Barotseland, similar to the one that had recently been extended over neighbouring Bechuanaland. However, the king and the missionary misunderstood the connections between the British crown and the British South Africa Company (BSAC) of Cecil Rhodes. Lewanika and Coillard were gradually entangled in a web of intrigue, which resulted in the signing of the Lochner Concession, which assigned the Lozi kingdom to the BSAC's domains on 27 June 1890. During the first seven years after signing the Concession, the BSAC failed to make any of its promised annual payments of £2000 or to provide any of the educational assistance that it had pledged to Lewanika.

== Later life and death ==
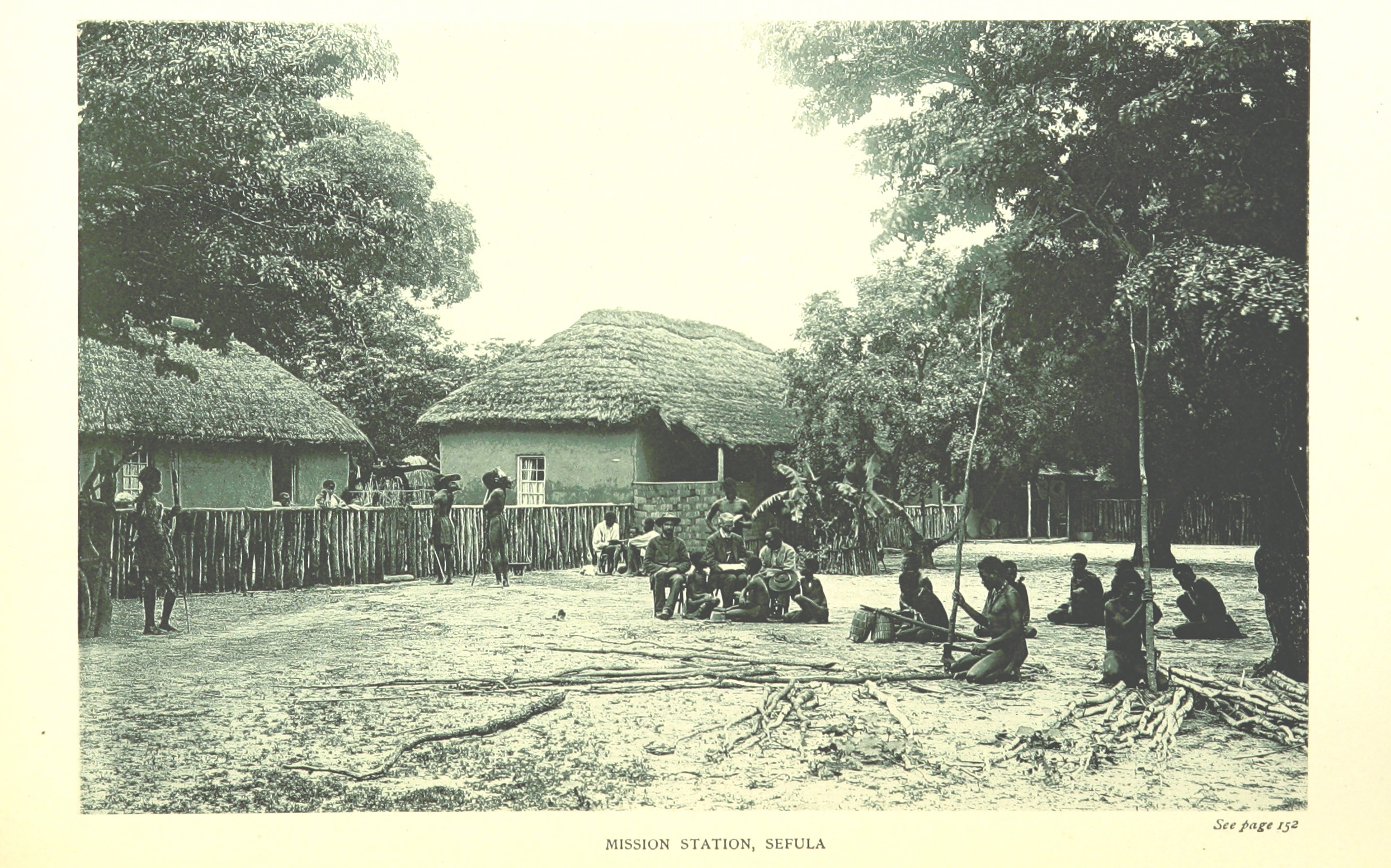
Mission at Sefula - A photograph by the British-Jamaican explorer in 1891/2 - Dr James Johnston.

After experiencing serious illness in 1895, Coillard spent the period 1896-8 in Europe. By February 1899 he was back at Leribé in Basutoland, on his way back to Barotseland. However, a large number of fatalities ensued among the missionary recruits of 1897 and onwards. Coillard was further shaken in 1903 by a breakaway movement of his converts, led by Willie Mokalapa.

Coillard suffered a fatal attack of haematuric fever at Lealui and died on 27 May 1904; he was buried near his wife at Sefula.

== Personal life ==
On 26 February 1861 he married Christina Mackintosh in Cape Town, South Africa. She was the daughter of a Scottish Baptist minister and was five years older than her husband. Christina's enthusiasm for missions was kindled at the age of 14, after listening to the preaching of veteran southern African missionary Robert Moffat. She toiled as her husband's missionary co-worker and shared all the hardships of their travels throughout their marriage. They never had any children.

Christina Coillard died on 28 October 1891 and the group of missionaries suffered a persistent high mortality rate, due primarily to tropical fevers. However, Coillard’s lively and moving letters to the PEM's offices in Paris made him a heroic figure to mission supporters in many countries. Many of these letters were published in 1889 as Sur le Haut-Zambèze: voyages et travaux de mission. His letters also appeared in an English translation by his niece, Catherine Winkworth Mackintosh (On the Threshold of Central Africa, 1897).

== Sources ==
- Norman Etherington, ‘Coillard, François (1834–1904)’, Oxford Dictionary of National Biography, Oxford University Press, Sept 2004; online edn, May 2006 accessed 16 July 2006
- C. W. Mackintosh, Coillard of the Zambesi (1907)
- E. Favre, François Coillard: enfance et jeunesse (1908)
- F. Coillard, ‘Preface’, in H. Dieterlen, Adolphe Mabille, missionnaire (1898)
- Journal des Missions Evangéliques (1865–1904)
- M. Wilson and L. Thompson, eds., The Oxford history of South Africa, 2 vols. (1971), vol. 2
- J. Du Plessis, A history of Christian missions in South Africa (1965)
- R. C. Germond, Chronicles of Basutoland (1967)
- L. H. Gann, A history of Southern Rhodesia: early days to 1934 (1965)
- A. Hastings, The church in Africa, 1450–1950 (1994); repr. (1996)
