= Sefula =

Settlement in Zambia

- Town
- Location in Zambia
- Coordinates: 15°22′S 23°12′E
- Country: Zambia
- Province: Western Province
- District: Mongu District
- Time zone: UTC+2 (CAT)

Sefula is a settlement in Western Province, Zambia. François Coillard established a mission station at Sefula in 1886.
