= Inonge Mbikusita-Lewanika =

Zambian politician

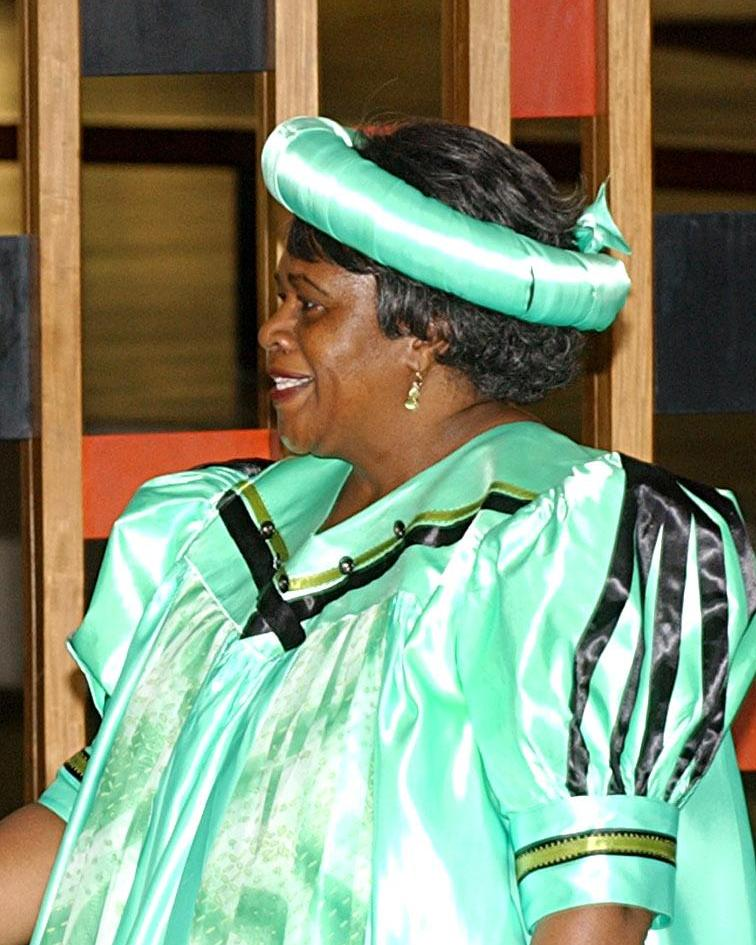
- as Ambassador to Brazil
- Born: 10 July 1943 (age 82); Senanga, Northern Rhodesia (now Zambia)
- Occupations: diplomat and politician
- Political party: Agenda for Zambia

Princess Inonge Mbikusita-Lewanika (born 10 July 1943, Senanga) is a Zambian politician who has served as Ambassador of the Republic of Zambia to the United States of America. She presented her credentials to U.S. President George W. Bush on 26 February 2003.

== Life ==
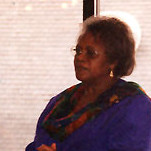
Inonge Mbikusita-Lewanika

Lewanika, who attended New York University, began her career as a teacher. Her higher-level education started in 1964 when she obtained a degree in home economics and a master's degree the following year from California Polytechnic State University. Her doctorate in elementary education came from New York University.

She was a lecturer and professor of education at the University of Zambia. She was later employed by UNICEF as a regional adviser for East and Southern Africa. In 1991 she was elected to Parliament for the Movement for Multiparty Democracy (MMD) in Zambia's first multi-party polls since 1972. She was a member of that parliament until 2001.

She was appointed as the Ambassador to the United States in 2003 and in 2006 she was recognised as "ambassador of the year" for her work on behalf of her country. She was still serving as ambassador in 2008. She was one of two women who ran to be President of Zambia in the elections of 2001, capturing about 0.6 percent of the vote under the Agenda for Zambia (AZ) banner. After the election she became Ambassador and Special Envoy for, Levy Mwanawasa, the new Zambian President when he was Chairman of the African Union.

She was awarded an honorary degree of Doctor of Laws by her alma mater, California Polytechnic State University, in 2009.

== Family ==
She is the daughter of King Lewanika II of Barotseland. Due to this fact, she currently holds the titles of princess and queen mother emerita in that kingdom.

Her brother, Prince Akashambatwa Mbikusita-Lewanika, is also a politician. She is married and has two daughters.
