= Akashambatwa Mbikusita-Lewanika =

Zambian politician and businessman

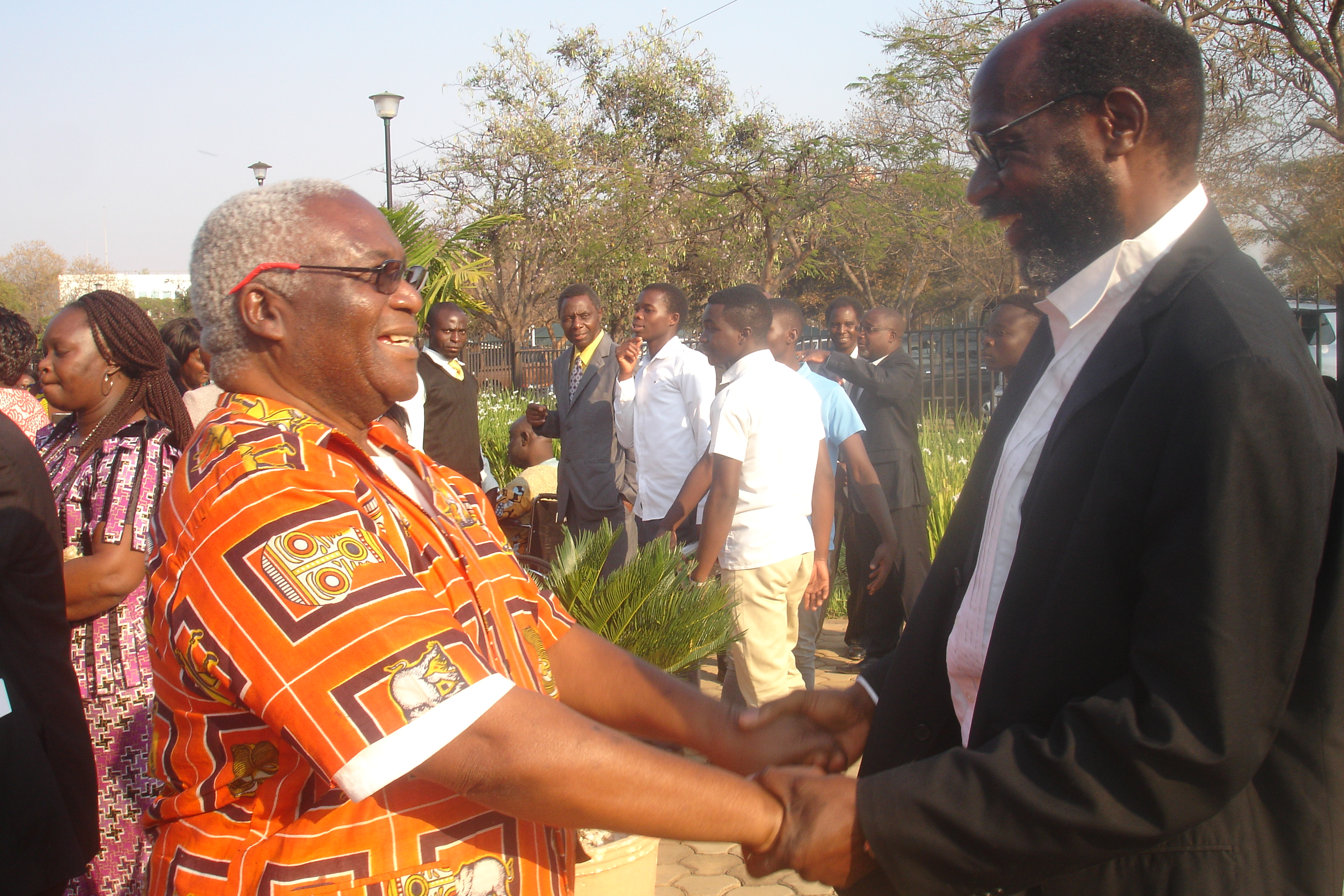
- Akashambatwa Mbikusita-Lewanika (left) and Fresher Siwale (right)
- Born: February 4, 1948 (age 78)
- Occupations: Politician and businessman
- Political party: Movement for Multiparty Democracy
- Relatives: Godwin Mbikusita-Lewanika (father); Inonge Mbikusita-Lewanika (sister)

Prince Akashambatwa Mbikusita-Lewanika (born 4 February 1948) is a Zambian politician and businessman with a princely title. He was a founding member of the Movement for Multiparty Democracy. During Rupiah Banda's presidency, he served as a Presidential Advisor for Political Affairs. His sister Princess Inonge Mbikusita-Lewanika is also a diplomat and politician who stood to be President in 2001.

== Works ==
- "Hour for Reunion: Movement for Multiparty Democracy; Conception, Dissension and Reconciliation"
