= Senanga District =

Coordinates: 16°15′S 23°15′E

- District
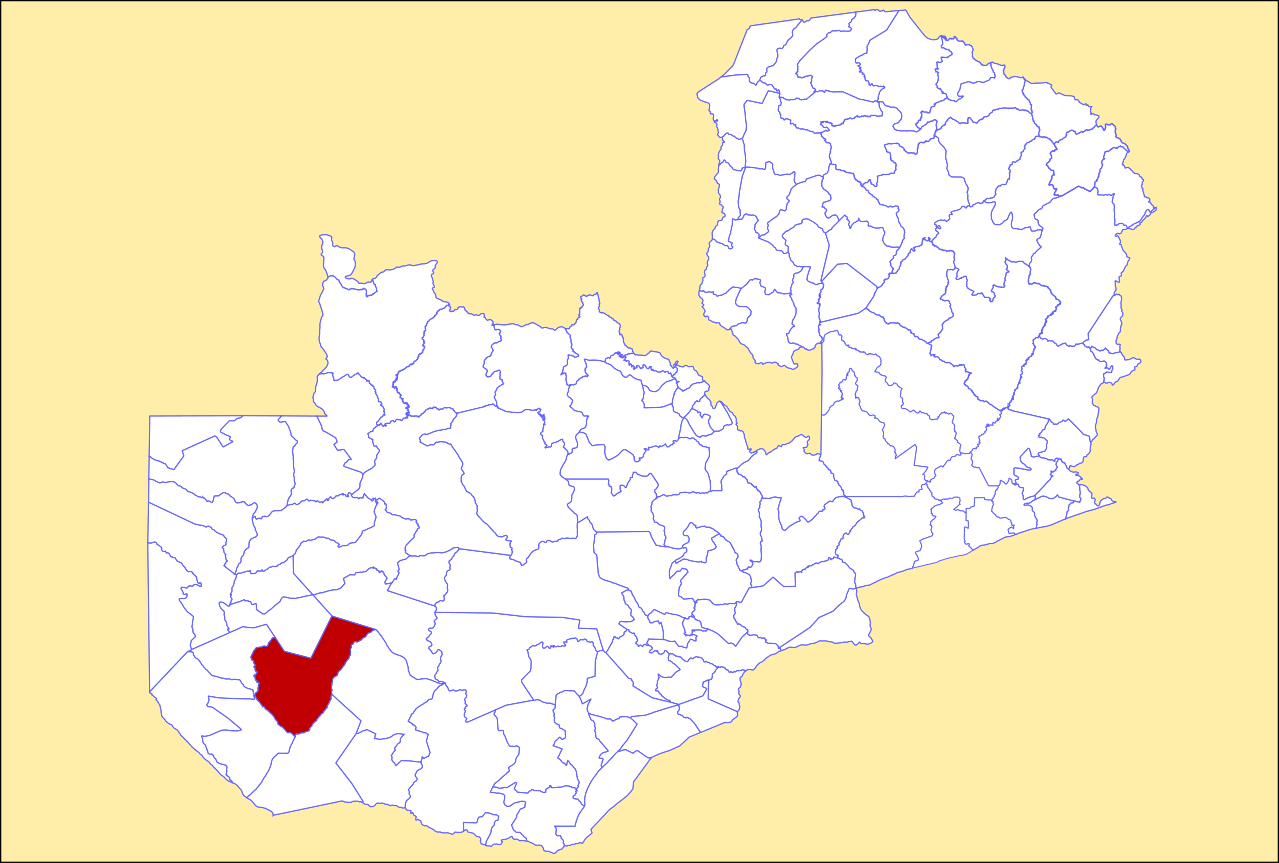
- District location in Zambia
- Country: Zambia
- Province: Western Province
- Capital: Senanga

Area
  - Total: 10,565.8 km^{2} (4,079.5 sq mi)

Population (2022)
  - Total: 112,040
  - Density: 10.604/km^{2} (27.464/sq mi)
- Time zone: UTC+2 (CAT)

Senanga District is a district of Zambia, located in Western Province. The capital lies at Senanga. As of the 2022 Zambian Census, the district had a population of 112,040 people.
