= Languages of Angola =

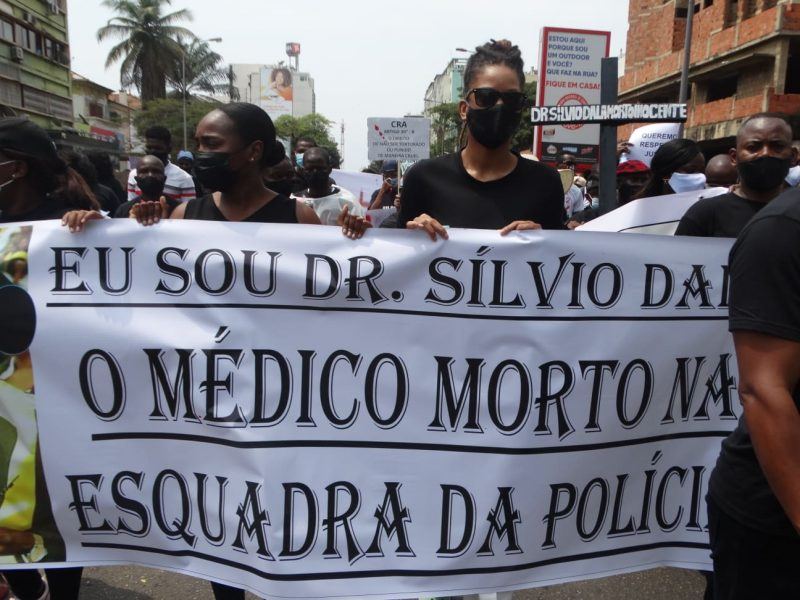
- Protestors in Angola with signs in Portuguese
- Official: Portuguese
- National: All recognized languages of Angola are "national languages"
- Recognised: Chokwe, Kikongo, Kimbundu, Oshiwambo, Luchazi, Umbundu
- Vernacular: Angolan Portuguese
- Foreign: English, French, Arabic, Chinese
- Signed: Namibian Sign Language
- Keyboard layout: Portuguese keyboard layout

Portuguese is the official language of Angola. Over 46 other languages are spoken in the country, mostly Bantu languages.

== European languages ==
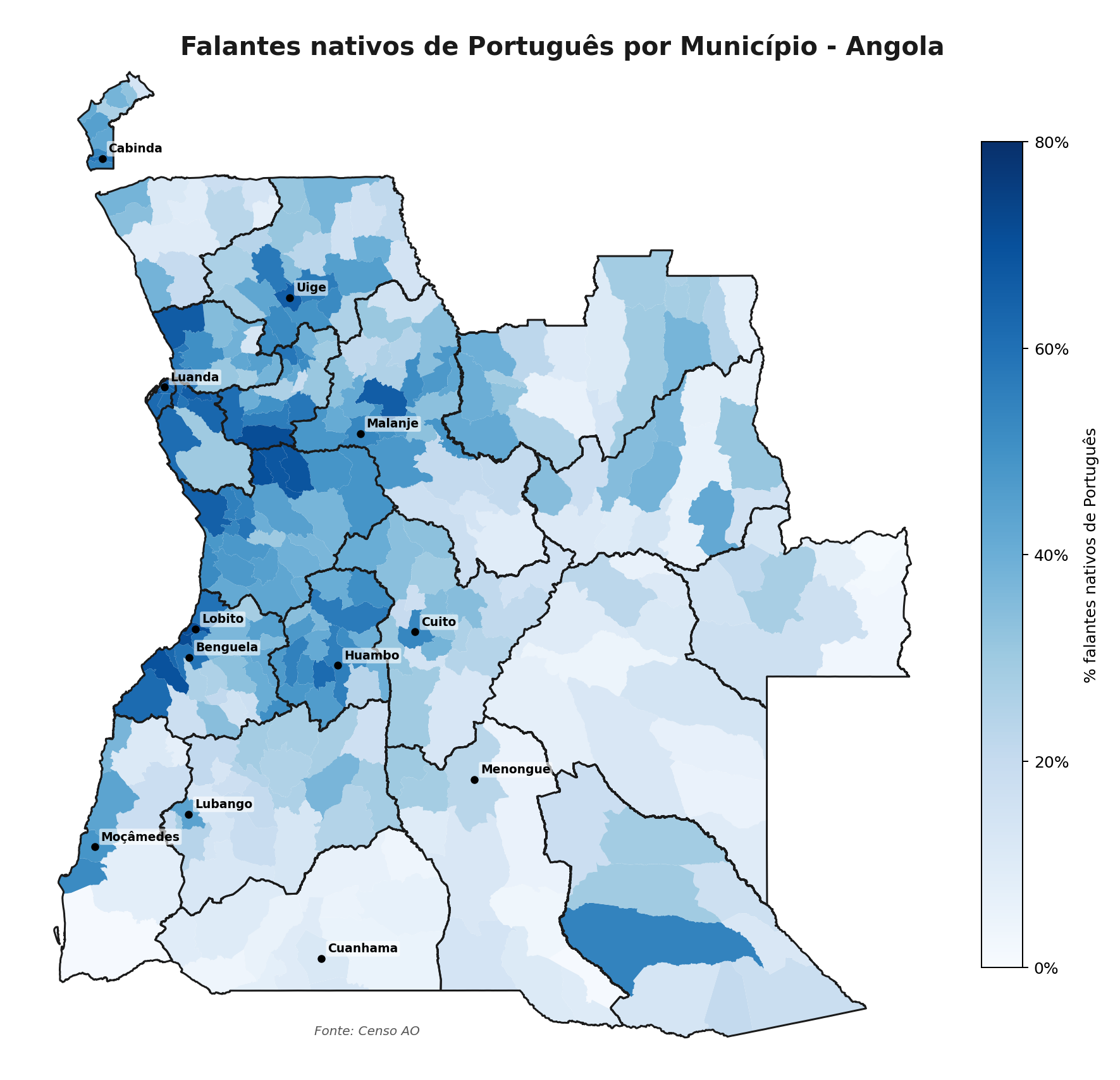
Percentage of Portuguese Native Speakers in each municipality of Angola

Portuguese is the sole official language. Cultural, social and political mechanisms that date back to colonial history causes the number of native Portuguese-speakers to be large and growing. (Note: During late colonialism (1962–1975), when all Angolans were considered as Portuguese citizens with equal rights, many black middle-class families in the cities refused to teach their children native languages so that they could compete with whites by speaking Portuguese the same way.) A 2012 study by the Angolan National Institute for Statistics found that Portuguese is the mother tongue of 39% of the population. 2024 Census shows over 45% of the population are native speakers of Portuguese. It is spoken as a second language by many more throughout the country, and the younger urban generations are moving towards the dominant or exclusive use of Portuguese. The 2014 population census found that about 71% of the nearly 25.8 million inhabitants of Angola speak Portuguese at home. In urban areas, 85% of the population declared to speak Portuguese at home in the 2014 census as opposed to 49% in rural areas.

Portuguese was adopted by Angolans in the mid-20th century as a lingua franca among the various ethnic groups. After the Angolan Civil War, many people moved to the cities, where they learned Portuguese. When they returned to the countryside, more people were speaking Portuguese as a first language. The variant of the Portuguese language used in Angola is known as Angolan Portuguese. Phonetically, this variant is very similar to the Mozambican variant with some exceptions. Some believe that Angolan Portuguese resembles a pidgin in some aspects.

However, in Cabinda, wedged between two French-speaking countries (the Democratic Republic of the Congo and the Republic of Congo), many people speak French as well as or better than Portuguese. In fact, of the literate population, 90 percent speak French, and only 10 percent speak Portuguese. Also, the Angolan Bakongo who were exiled to the Democratic Republic of the Congo usually speak better French and Lingala than Portuguese and Kikongo.

== African languages ==
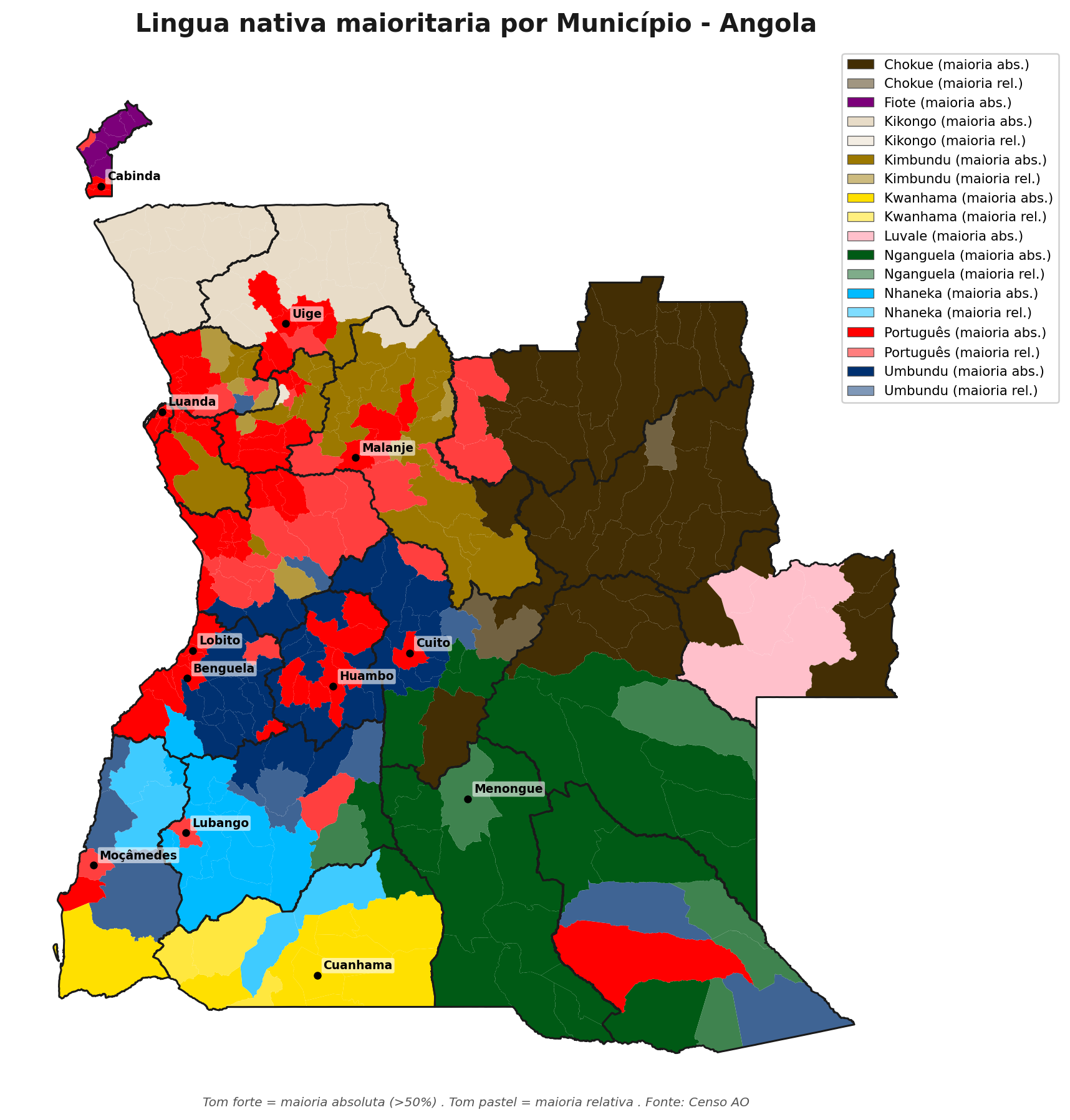
Linguistic map of Angola

All native languages of Angola are considered to be national languages. After independence, the government said it would choose six to be developed as literary languages. The six languages vary between government pronouncements but commonly include Umbundu, Kimbundu, Kikongo (presumably the Fiote of Cabinda), Chokwe, Kwanyama (Ovambo), and Mbunda (never clearly defined; may be Nyemba, Luchazi, or indeterminate). Angolan radio transmits in fourteen of the "main" national languages: Bangala ('Mbangala'), Chokwe, Fiote, Herero ('Helelo'), Kikongo, Kimbundu, Kwanyama, Lunda, Ngangela, Ngoya, Nyaneka, Ovambo ('Oxiwambo'), Songo, Umbundu. Some of the national languages are used in Angolan schools, including the provision of teaching materials such as books, but there is a shortage of teachers.

Umbundu, the most widely-spoken Bantu language, is spoken natively by about 23 percent of the population, about 5.9 million, mainly in the centre and the south of the country. Kimbundu is spoken in Luanda Province and adjacent provinces. Kikongo is spoken in the northwest, including the exclave of Cabinda. About 8.24% of Angolans use Kikongo. Fiote is spoken by about 2.9%, mainly in Cabinda. Lingala is also spoken in Angola.

The San people speak languages from two families, the !Kung and Khoe though only a few hundred speak the latter. The majority of San fled to South Africa after the end of the civil war. The extinct Kwadi language may have been distantly related to Khoe, and Kwisi is entirely unknown; their speakers were neither Khoisan nor Bantu.

== Asian languages ==
A very small number of Angolans of Lebanese descent descent speak Lebanese Arabic and/or French. Increasing Angola-China relations has caused a Chinese-speaking community of about 300,000.

== Demographics ==
Unlike the previous ones, 2024 Census questioned the mother tongue of individuals rather than the language spoken at home.

Mother Tongue	2024 Census	
Mother Tongue	#	%
Portuguese	15,697,180	45.5
Umbundu	5,881,181	17.1
Kimbundu	3,728,001	10.8
Cokue (Chokwe/Kioko)	2,374,104	6.9
Kikongo	2,351,518	6.8
Olunyaneka (Nhaneka)	1473568	4.3
Oxikwanhama (Kwanhama)	1,003,783	2.9
Nganguela	700,878	2.0
Ifyoti (Fiote)	390,858	1.1
Muhumbi	235,063	0.7
Luvale	179,517	0.5
Lingala	84,914	0.2
French	14,497	0.0
Khoisan	11,406	0.0
English	8,086	0.0
Arabic	5,325	0.0
Creole	3,877	0.0
Spanish	3,306	0.0
Mandarin	1,036	0.0
Russian	258	0.0
German	91	0.0
Other languages	196,928	0.6
Unknown	147,511	0.4
Total (Note: Total population over 2 years old)	34,492,888	100

Here are the number of speakers by languages according to Ethnologue:

Rank	Languages	Number of speakers in Angola
1	Portuguese	15,470,000
2	Umbundu	6,000,000
3	Kikongo	2,000,000
4	Kimbundu	1,700,000
5	Luvale	464,000
6	Kwanyama (Oshiwambo)	461,000
7	Cokwe/Chokwe	456,000
8	Lucazi	400,000
8	Mbangala	400,000
10	Ibinda	350,000
11	Nyaneka	300,000
12	Mbwela	222,000
12	Nyemba	222,000
14	Yaka	200,000
15	Lunda	178,000
16	Nkumbi	150,000
17	Mbunda	135,000
18	Ruund	98,500
19	Kuvale	70,000
20	Luba-Kasai	60,000
21	Songo	50,000
22	Luimbi	43,900
23	Yombe	39,400
24	Mpinda	30,000
24	Suku	30,000
26	Gciriku	24,000
26	Sama	24,000
28	Holu	23,100
29	Ndombe	22,300
29	Nkangala	22,300
31	Kwangali	22,000
32	Himba/Herero	20,000
32	Khongo	20,000
34	Dhimba/Zemba	18,000
35	Yauma	17,100
36	Ngandyera (Oshiwambo)	13,100
37	Nyengo	9,380
38	Kwandu	6,000
39	Northwestern ǃKung	5,630
40	Kung-Ekoka	5,500
41	Mbukushu	4,000
42	Makoma	3,000
43	Kibala	2,630
43	Mashi	2,630
45	Ngendelengo	900
46	Khwedam	200
-	Kilari	Unknown number in Angola
-	Kwadi	No known native speakers in Angola

== Foreign languages ==
The foreign languages that are the most at school are English and French. The Angolan government has planned to make English a compulsory subject.

== See also ==
- Angolan Portuguese
- Constitution of Angola
