= Ulla Nenonen =

- Born: October 31, 1933; Loviisa, Finland
- Died: March 9, 2018 (aged 84); Tampere, Finland
- Education: Candidate of theology
- Occupation: Missionary in Namibia
- Years active: 1961–2015
- Theological work
- Language: Finnish, Oshiwambo, Dhimba
- Tradition or movement: Lutheran

Ulla Pirkko Nenonen (born October 31, 1933 – 9 March 2018) was a Finnish theologian, missionary with the Finnish Missionary Society and Bible translator, who served in missionary work in Namibia over the course of 54 years. Of Finnish missionaries, only Martti Rautanen and his wife Frieda and daughter Johanna have served longer in the mission field.

Nenonen spent most of her childhood in Kuusankoski, but she graduated from high school in Imatra in 1954. She obtained a degree in theology from the University of Helsinki in 1960. Soon after this she departed for Ovamboland.

== Career as a teacher in Ovamboland ==
Ulla Nenonen arrived to Ovamboland, one of the mission fields of the Finnish Missionary Society, in 1961, and began by studying Afrikaans and Oshindonga. At first she worked at the Oniipa Printing Press, but soon she was transferred to Okahao, to work the local women’s teacher training seminary, and she soon became the principal of the seminary. She later also taught as a teacher in the local secondary school. At that time, the government had no schools in the north of Namibia, so the mission schools were the only possibility for the locals to get education. Life in Ovamboland was peaceful, until the aspirations of the SWAPO to achieve independence for the country turned into guerrilla warfare. “I had to make the decision of whether my life was more valuable that the life of someone else. I came to the conclusion that it certainly wasn’t,” she said the Finnish Broadcasting corporation Yle in an interview in 2011. Once she defied the night time curfew established by South Africa and drove a patient to a government hospital, since she could not expect that a local driver could be assumed to undertake such a task. She was stopped by the authorities and was given a strenuous interrogation, but in the end she was allowed to proceed.

During 1980–83 Nenonen worked as the vice-rector of the Oshigambo High School. During 1983–93 she acted as the head of the mission in Oniipa. She was there in one of the most important places with regard to the independence process of Namibia. She hosted the Secretary-General of the United Nations, various emissaries, ministers and presidents from different countries, among them Martti Ahtisaari, who was overseeing the transfer from South African to Namibian rule. Nenonen was able to provide these people with accurate information on what was going on in the country.

== Work as a Bible translator during retirement ==
After retiring from the FMS, Nenonen did not return to Finland, as other missionaries had done, as she was invited by Bishop Kleopas Dumeni of the Ovambo-Kavango Church to assist in Bible translation to the Dhimba language in Opuwo, Kunene Province, where she worked until 2015. Dhimba is closely related to the Herero language and somewhat more distantly related to the Ovambo language. Her collaborator in this work was the Dhimba pastor Johannes Tolu, the only Dhimba to have studied to become a pastor. At the time, the Dhimba language did not have a writing system, so their first task was to devise one. The work was supported by the Lutheran Bible Translators from the United States, the United Bible Societies and a Finnish association called Support for the Namibian Church. The work of Pastor Tolu was supported by the Tampere Cathedral Congregation. The New Testament was completed in 2011, but due to difficulties in its printing, it appeared only in January 2014. After that the team began to translate the Old Testament. Study of the Dhimba language has also been a part of the project, as well as collecting of stories and songs, and the team has also produces primers, reading books, songbooks, and put out Compact Cassettes, which contain texts from both the Old and the New Testament read aloud in Dhimba. One aspect of the work has been the development of the Dhimba language with a view toward its preservation and a literacy programme.

Even after her return to Finland in 2015, Nenonen assisted the Dhimba translation team via e-mail, and proof read translations and helped in compiling a dictionary of the language.

Yle has made a television documentary of the Dhimba Bible translation programme with the title “Dhimba translators”. It was broadcast on YLE 1 in 2003.

The work of Ulla Nenonen has received attention from e.g. President Martti Ahtisaari, when he spoke in the 140th anniversary festivities of the Finnish Missionary Society in 1999.

Ulla Nenonen’s tasks in Namibia
Place	Years	Tasks
Oniipa	1961–62	Printing press
Okahao	1963–74	Teacher at women’s seminary and secondary school
Okahao	1974–79	Rector at women’s seminary and secondary school
Oshigambo	1980–82	Vice rector of high school
Oniipa	1983–93	Superior of the mission field
Opuwo	1993–2015	Bible translation
