= Chimba =

Chimba or La Chimba may refer to:

- Chimba (footballer, born 1983), Brazilian football forward
- Chimba (footballer, born 1987), Brazilian football forward
- Chimba skink, or Trachylepis chimbana, a species of skink in southern Africa
- La Chimba Airport, a defunct airport serving Antofagasta, Chile
- La Chimba National Reserve, in Antofagasta Region, Chile
- Tjimba people, an ethnic group of Namibia and Angola
- Zemba language, a Bantu language in Angola

== See also ==
- Chimbas, a city in Chimbas Department, San Juan Province, Argentina
