= Kwambi dialect =

Ovambo language of Namibia and Angola

Kwambi
- Oshikwambi
- Native to: Namibia and Angola
- Region: Ovamboland
- Native speakers: 33,000 (2006)
- Language family: Niger–Congo?: Atlantic–Congo; Benue–Congo; Southern Bantoid; Bantu; Kavango–Southwest; Southwest Bantu; Ovambo; Kwambi

Language codes
- ISO 639-3: kwm
- Glottolog: kwam1251
- Guthrie code: R.23

Kwambi or Otshikwambi is a dialect of the Ovambo language spoken by the Kwambi tribe in Northern Namibia. Unlike Ndonga and Kwanyama it does not have a standardized written form in schools but is used and written in the Roman Catholic Church in Namibia. It shares more features with Ndonga than with Kwanyama.

== Phonology ==
=== Vowels ===
Kwambi uses a five-vowel system:

	Front	Back
Close	i	u
Mid	ɛ	ɔ
Open	a	

=== Consonants ===
Kwambi contains the following consonant phonemes:

		Labial	Dental	Alveolar	Palatal	Velar	Glottal
Nasal		m	n		ɲ		
Plosive	voiceless	p	t			k	
Plosive	voiced	mb	nd			ŋg	
Affricate	voiceless				tʃ		
Affricate	voiced				ndʒ		
Fricative	voiceless	f	θ	s	ʃ		h
Fricative	voiced	v	ð	z		ɣ	
Approximant	median	w			j		
Approximant	lateral			(l)	ʎ		
Tap				ɾ			

Note that the symbol /ɾ/ has been chosen for the liquid phoneme in the table even though this phoneme has a wide range of pronunciations even in the speech of individual speakers, just like in Ndonga, ranging from an alveolar tap [ɾ] to a lateral approximant [l], with something that can perhaps be described as a lateral flap also occurring. Magnusson (2003) found a tendency for Kwambi speakers to use a tap pronunciation more often than a lateral approximant, and also a tendency for Kwambi speakers to use this alveolar tap more than speakers of Ndonga.

== Vocabulary ==
Kwambi shares most of its vocabulary with Ndonga. However, in addition to some differences which are predictable due to phonological differences (such as Kwambi ‘tshuna’ vs. Ndonga ‘shuna’ (=go back) due to the fact that Ndonga has no affricate) there are some other differences as well.

There are word pairs where Kwambi has /w/ instead of Ndonga /j/ even though both dialects have both phonemes as part of their phonological inventory – for example ‘ekuwa’ vs. ‘ekuya’ for ‘axe’ and ‘uuluwi’ vs. ‘uuluyi’ for ‘brain’.

Kwambi ‘pwaakena’ for ‘listen’ corresponds to Ndonga ‘pulakena’.

In some words Kwambi has /h/ where Ndonga has /j/, as in for example ‘hina’ vs. ‘yina’ (=his/her/their mother), ‘ha’ vs. ‘ya’ (=go) and ‘ehego’ vs. ‘eyego’ (=tooth).

Words for ‘good’ and ‘bad’ come in a variety of forms, but h-forms such as ‘aahanawa’, ‘uuhanawa’, ‘iihanawa’ etc. (=good) and ‘aahineyi’, ‘uuhineyi’ and ‘iihineyi’ (=bad) are only found in Kwambi, not in Ndonga (compare ‘aawanawa’, ‘uuwanawa’, ‘iiwanawa’ and ‘aawinayi’, ‘uuwinayi’, ‘iiwinayi’ respectively).

The personal pronoun for 1st person plural is ‘se’ in Kwambi but ‘tse’ in Ndonga. A difference in 1st person singular pronouns, Kwambi ‘ngaye’ vs. Ndonga ‘ngame’, is noticeable when comparing spoken Kwambi with written Ndonga, but in spoken Ndonga ‘ngaye’ is commonly used, just like in Kwambi. Similarly, for 2nd person singular Kwambi ‘ngweye’ at first glance seems to contrast with Ndonga ‘ngoye’, but again there is less of a difference if we only compare the spoken varieties of the dialects, since ‘ngweye’ is commonly found in spoken Ndonga.

The word for ‘who’ in Kwambi is ‘ore’ (plural ‘oore’), contrasting with Ndonga ‘olye’ (plural ‘oolye’).

The sequence nasal+fricative in some Ndonga demonstratives (ndhika, ndhoka etc.) corresponds to a single fricative in Kwambi (dhika, dhoka etc.). Demonstratives with an initial sequence nasal+k in Ndonga are absent from Kwambi, where the forms ‘huka’, ‘hoka’ etc. are always used instead of ‘nkuka’, ‘nkoka’ etc. A phenomenon whereby non-syllabic /m/ cannot occur in front of /v/ in Kwambi might be related, and it gives rise to word pairs such as Kwambi ‘ovura’ (=rain) and ‘nuuvo’ (=this year) vs. Ndonga ‘omvula’ and ‘nuumvo’.

All verbs except ‘ha’ (=go) must be analysed as lacking an initial /h/ in Kwambi, which gives us word pairs such as Kwambi ‘ara’ vs. Ndonga ‘hala’ (=want) and Kwambi ‘anga’ vs. Ndonga ‘hanga’ (=brew beer). However, a phonological rule inserts an initial [h] in front of verbs in certain contexts as described by Magnusson (2003), which means that this difference is not always obvious.

Although both dialects have the words ‘kuutumba’ and ‘kaatumba’ for ‘sit’, Kwambi has a third commonly used variant, namely ‘kiitumba’, which does not exist in Ndonga. A vowel difference can also be seen in the word pair ‘kekama’ (Kwambi) vs. ‘kakama’ (Ndonga) for ‘shiver’.

The word for ‘like this’ is ‘ngeyi’ in Ndonga but ‘ngii’, ‘ngiino’ or ‘ngiika’ in Kwambi. This also has an effect on the words for ‘now’, which seem to be derived from these. In other words, Kwambi ‘ngashingii’, ‘ngashingiika’ and ‘ngashingiino’ correspond to Ndonga ‘ngashingeyi’ (or ‘ngayingeyi’).

There are also cases where the two dialects use non-cognate words, like Kwambi ‘embare’ vs. Ndonga ‘egala’ (=hat), Kwambi ‘otshimbare’ vs. Ndonga ‘ontungwa’ (a kind of traditional basket) and ‘eshisha’ vs. Ndonga ‘oshigandhi’ (=granary, corn bin). Also, there is a part of a traditional Ovambo homestead that is called ‘otshoto’ in Kwambi but ‘oshinyanga’ in Ndonga. The word ‘onime’ for lion is an exclusively Ndonga word, while the synonym ‘onkoshi’ is used in both dialects.

At least one case exists where Kwambi and Ndonga assign a word to different noun classes, namely the word ‘oshoro’ (with class 9 prefix o-), which in Ndonga is ‘uuholo’ (with class 14 prefix uu-). The word refers to a game involving small holes in the ground and pebbles.

There are significant differences in the use of conjunctions, with the common Ndonga conjunction ‘ihe’ (=but, consequently) being absent from Kwambi, where ‘ndere’ can be used instead. Kwambi ‘ngeno’ (which can serve for example to introduce counteractive clauses), on the other hand, is absent from Ndonga. Furthermore, the Ndonga word ‘e’ (which can perhaps be best translated as ‘and’) is practically absent from Magnusson's (2003) Kwambi material. ‘Nkene/nkee’ and ‘onkene/onkee’ are also very rare in Kwambi.

Regarding the numerals, Kwambi uses mostly ‘ine’ as a word for ‘four’ when counting words from noun class 4 and 10, contrasting with Ndonga ‘ne’, and ‘uwaari’ for ‘two’ when the head noun belongs to noun class 14, contrasting with Ndonga ‘uyali’. Traditional Kwambi also had a distinct set of words for the numbers six, seven and eight, which was not sensitive to the noun class of the counted object and was based on a system of counting “little fingers”. The word for ‘six’, ‘kanekamwe’, corresponded to Ndonga ‘hamano’, ‘uunuwari’ for ‘seven’ corresponded to Ndonga ‘heyali’ and ‘uunuutatu’ for ‘eight’ corresponded to Ndonga ‘hetatu’. These were contracted forms of the phrases ‘okanwe kamwe’, ‘uunwe uwaari’ and ‘uunwe utatu’ respectively, meaning ‘one little finger’ ‘two little fingers’ and ‘three little fingers’. Some older speakers can still be heard using these forms (Magnusson (2003) even recorded one case of an elderly man using the uncontracted form ‘uunwe utatu’ for ‘eight’), but they are clearly disappearing from the language.

Finally, there are cases where a word which exists in both dialects has an extended meaning in one of them. The word ‘yoga’, which in both dialects means ‘swim’, is used in Ndonga also in the sense ‘wash’, for which Kwambi uses ‘kosha’. In a similar vein, Ndonga uses ‘nyola’ (=engrave) also in the sense ‘write’, for which Kwambi uses ‘tshanga’. In the case of the word ‘epasha’ (Ndonga ‘epaha’), meaning ‘twin birth’, it seems that it is instead Kwambi that has an extended meaning for the word, using it to denote something abnormal at birth more generally, e.g. a case where the baby's feet come out first.

== Morphology ==
As with the vocabulary, Kwambi morphology is basically similar to Ndonga. Some of the differences that exist are predictable due to phonological differences. For example, grammatical forms associated with Bantu noun class 7 consistently have an affricate in Kwambi where Ndonga has a fricative, which for example can be seen in the local names of the dialects themselves: Otshikwambi vs. Oshindonga.

Nevertheless, not all differences are due to differences in the phoneme inventories of the two dialects. Most notably, the use of the prefix ee- for noun class 10 (like in Kwanyama) sets Kwambi apart from Ndonga, which uses oo-. The existence of a form emu- or eemu- co-existing with omi- as a noun class 4 prefix is only found in Kwambi, not in Ndonga. Furthermore, Kwambi has a simplified system for negative concords, where the forms for the negative subjunctive are the same as those of the negative habitual (1p sing ‘kandi’, 1p pl ‘katu’ etc.). Another difference is that Kwambi makes a distinction between noun classes 8 and 9 in that many of the grammatical forms for class 9 have an /h/ where Ndonga uses /j/, which makes the Ndonga class 9 forms such as ‘otayi’ (present tense concord) and ‘oya’ (past tense concord) identical to those used by both dialects for class 8. Lastly, whereas Ndonga has a full set of forms for ‘only’, inflected according to noun class (‘alike’, ‘aguke’ etc.), Kwambi uses the uninflected word ‘ike’, as in ‘omadhina ike’ (=only the names).

== Literature ==
A New Testament was published in the Kwambi language in 1951, as Etestamtente Epe. The Gospels and the Apocalypse were translated by Father K. Kress and the Acts of the Apostles and the Epistles were translated by Father Franz Seiler and published by Omission Heklesia Ekatolika.
