= Ndombe =

Ndombe may be,

- Ndombe language, Angola
- Ndombe Opetum (Pepe Ndombe)
- Firmin Ndombe Mubele

== See also ==
- Mai-Ndombe Province
- Lake Mai-Ndombe
