= Kimbundu languages =

Group of Bantu languages

Kimbundu
- Northern Mbundu
- Linguistic classification: Niger–Congo?: Atlantic–Congo; Benue–Congo; Southern Bantoid; Bantu (Zone H.20); Kimbundu

Language codes
- Glottolog: mbun1247

The Kimbundu languages are a group of Bantu languages coded Zone H.20 in Guthrie's classification. According to Nurse & Philippson (2003), they probably form a valid node, though this is still uncertain. They are:

Kimbundu (Mbundu), Sama, Bolo, Mpinda.

Songo is often assumed to be a dialect of Kimbundu, but actually appears to be one of the Teke languages. Ngoya to its south was until recently considered a dialect of Kimbundu, but has now been recognized as a language in own right, and may be transitional between Kimbundu and Umbundu.
