= Dombe language =

Dombe language may refer to:

- A dialect of the Tonga language (Zambia and Zimbabwe), spoken in Zambia and Zimbabwe
- Ndombe language, spoken in Angola
