= Angola–United Kingdom relations =

- Angola: United Kingdom

Diplomatic mission
- Embassy of Angola, London: Embassy of the United Kingdom, Luanda

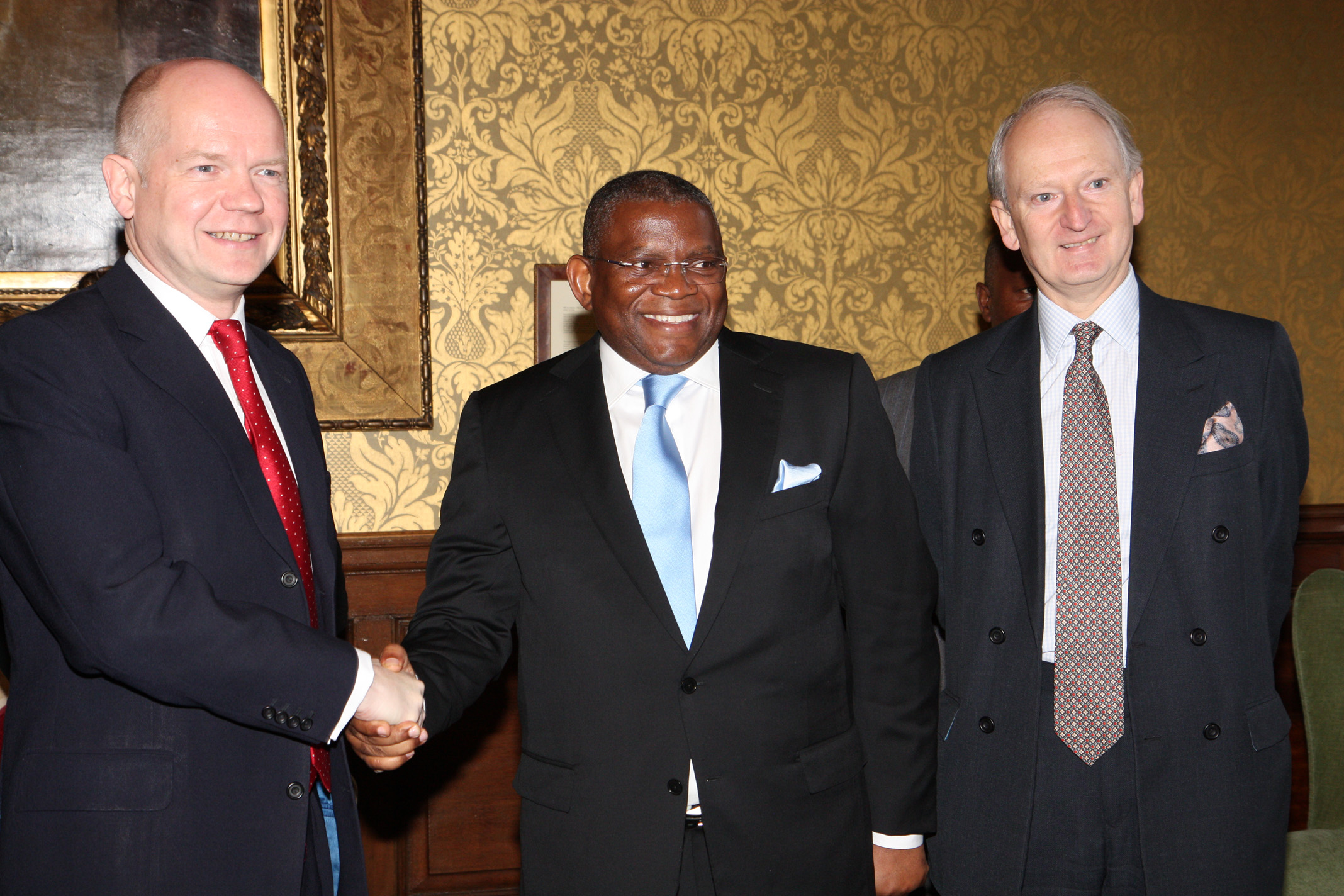
British Foreign Secretary William Hague with Foreign Minister Georges Rebelo Chikoti and Foreign Office Minister Henry Bellingham in London, February 2012.

Angola–United Kingdom relations are the foreign and bilateral relations between the Republic of Angola and the United Kingdom of Great Britain and Northern Ireland. The two countries established diplomatic relations on 14 October 1977.

Both countries share common membership of the Atlantic Co-operation Pact, the World Health Organization, and the World Trade Organization.

== Commonwealth of Nations ==
The United Kingdom supports Angola's aspiration to join the Commonwealth of Nations.

== Diplomatic missions ==
- Angola maintains an embassy in London.
- The United Kingdom is accredited to Angola through its embassy in Luanda.

== See also ==
- Angolans in the United Kingdom
- Foreign relations of Angola
- Foreign relations of the United Kingdom
- Member states of the Commonwealth of Nations
- Luanda Trial
