= Nenonen =

Nenonen is a Finnish surname. Notable people with the surname include:

- Markus Nenonen (born 1992), Finnish ice hockey player
- Ulla Nenonen (1933–2018), Finnish theologian and missionary
- Vilho Petter Nenonen (1883–1960), Finnish general
