= SCMB =

SCMB may refer to:

- Santa Cruz and Monterey Bay Railway
- La Chimba Airport
- Sistema Colégio Militar do Brasil, the school system supporting the Brazilian Armed Forces, particularly children of personnel
- School of Chemistry & Molecular Biosciences at the University of Queensland
