= NDQ =

NDQ or ndq may refer to:

- North Dakota Quarterly, a literary journal published quarterly by the University of North Dakota
- ndq, the ISO 639-3 code for Ndombe language, Angola
