= Kwangwa language =

Bantu language spoken in Zambia

Kwangwa
- Kwanga
- Native to: Zambia
- Native speakers: 2,400 Kwanga and Kwandi (2010 census)
- Language family: Niger–Congo?: Atlantic–Congo; Benue–Congo; Southern Bantoid; Bantu (Zone K); Kavango?; Kwangwa

Language codes
- ISO 639-3: None (mis)
- Glottolog: kwan1275 Kwangwa kwan1274 Kwandi
- Guthrie code: K.37, K.371

Kwangwa (Kwanga) is a Bantu language of Zambia.

Maho (2009) lists K.721 Kwandi as a distinct but closely related language.

Kwandi and Kwanga had once been classified as dialects of the divergent Luyana language.
