= Ngambwe language =

Bantu language of Angola

Ngambwe
- Olungambwe
- Native to: Angola
- Language family: Niger–Congo?: Atlantic–Congo; Benue–Congo; Bantoid; Bantu; Kavango–Southwest; Southwest Bantu; Ngambwe

Language codes
- ISO 639-3: None (mis)
- Glottolog: None

Ngambwe is a Bantu language of Angola. Until perhaps Anita Pfouts (2003), it was considered a dialect of Nyaneka.
