= Hakaona =

Bantu language of Angola and Namibia

- Havakona
- Native to: Angola, Namibia
- Language family: Niger–Congo?: Atlantic–Congo; Benue–Congo; Southern Bantoid; Bantu; Kavango–Southwest; Southwest Bantu; Hakaona

Language codes
- ISO 639-3: None (mis)
- Glottolog: None
- Guthrie code: included in R.311

Hakaona (Hakawona, Havakona) is a Bantu language of Angola and Namibia. Until perhaps Anita Pfouts (2003), it was considered a dialect of Herero.

Maho (2009) sets up a Northwest Herero language, which includes Zimba; from the map, it would appear to include Himba and Hakaona as well.
