= Luyana language =

Language in the Bantu family

Luyana
- Esiluyana
- Native to: Zambia; immigrants in Namibia, Angola
- Region: Okavango River
- Native speakers: 480 Luyana proper (2010 census); 2,900 all Luyana (Kwandi, Kwangwa, and Luyana proper) (2010 census)
- Language family: Niger–Congo?: Atlantic–Congo; Benue–Congo; Southern Bantoid; Bantu (Zone K); Luyana
- Writing system: Latin

Language codes
- ISO 639-3: lyn
- Glottolog: luya1241
- Guthrie code: K.31

Luyana (Luyaana), also known as Luyi (Louyi, Lui, Rouyi), is a Bantu language spoken in Zambia and perhaps in small numbers in neighboring countries. It appears to be a divergent lineage of Bantu. It is spoken by the Luyana people, a subgroup of the Lozi people.

Ethnologue lists Kwandi, Mbowe, Mbume, and possibly Kwangwa ("Kwanga") as dialects. Maho (2009) classifies these as distinct languages; it is not clear if any of them are part of the divergent Luyana branch of Bantu, or if they are Kavango languages.

The writing system of the Luyana language was developed in 2011 and uses the Latin script.

The language is taught in primary schools and secondary schools.

== Phonology ==
=== Vowels ===
Vowels
	Front	Back
Close	i	u
Mid	e	o
Open	a	

Luyana has five simple vowels: ⟨a⟩, ⟨e⟩, ⟨i⟩, ⟨o⟩, and ⟨u⟩. ⟨o⟩ is almost always open and is rarely closed. Wherever there may be hesitation between ⟨o⟩ and ⟨u⟩, ⟨u⟩ should be used.

There are no diphthongs. When two vowels meet, they contract, or one is omitted.

=== Consonants ===
The consonant inventory of Luyana is shown below.

		Bilabial	Dental/Alveolar	Post-alveolar	Palatal	Velar
Plosive	voiceless	p	t̪			k
Plosive	voiced	b	d̪			ɡ
Affricate			dz	dʒ		
Fricative			s	ʃ		
Nasal		m	n		ɲ	ŋ
Approximant			l		j	w

== See also ==
- Mbowe language
