= Shanjo language =

Bantu language of Zambia

Shanjo
- Native to: Zambia
- Native speakers: 4,400 total of perhaps Shanjo, Mala, and Kafue Twa (2010 census)
- Language family: Niger–Congo?: Atlantic–Congo; Benue–Congo; Southern Bantoid; Bantu (Zone K); Kavango?; Shanjo

Language codes
- ISO 639-3: included in Tonga (Zambia) [toi]
- Glottolog: shan1291
- Guthrie code: K.36

Shanjo (Sanjo) is a Bantu language of Zambia. Maho (2009) lists it as distinct from Tonga, which it has sometimes been classified as a dialect of.
