= Simaa language =

Bantu language spoken in Zambia

Simaa
- Native to: Zambia
- Native speakers: 17,000 (2010 census)
- Language family: Niger–Congo?: Atlantic–Congo; Benue–Congo; Southern Bantoid; Bantu; Kavango–Southwest?; Kavango?; Simaa
- Dialects: Simaa; Mulonga; Mwenyi; Koma; Imilangu

Language codes
- ISO 639-3: sie
- Glottolog: sima1258
- Guthrie code: K.35
- ELP: Mwenyi

Simaa is a Bantu language of Zambia. It was assigned by Guthrie to Bantu group K.30, which Pfouts (2003) established as part of the Kavango–Southwest branch of Bantu.

Maho (2009) lists K35 Simaa, K351 Mulonga, K352 Mwenyi, K353 Koma (Makoma), and K354 Imilangu, all covered by ISO code [sie], as distinct but closely related languages.
