= Mpinda language =

Bantu language of Angola

Mpinda
- Native to: Angola
- Region: Porto Amboim
- Native speakers: 18,000 (2018)
- Language family: Niger–Congo?: Atlantic–Congo; Benue–Congo; Bantoid; Bantu (Zone H); Kimbundu (H.20); Mpinda

Language codes
- ISO 639-3: pnd
- Glottolog: mpin1234

Mbinda is a Bantu language of Angola that is closely related to Kimbundu. Ancestors of the Mpinda included speakers of Sama and Kikongo, and Mpinda has low intelligibility with neighboring languages.
