= Kwisi people =

Ethnic group in Angola

Kwisi
Regions with significant populations
- Angola

Languages
- Kuvale, formerly Kwisi

The Kwisi are a seashore-fishing and hunter-gatherer people of southwest Angola that physically seem to be a remnant of an indigenous population—along with the Kwadi, the Cimba, and the Damara—that are unlike either the San (Bushmen) or the Bantu.

== Language ==
Kwisi
- Mbundyu, Kwandu
- Native to: Angola
- Region: southern coast
- Extinct: 1963
- Language family: unclassified

Language codes
- ISO 639-3: None (mis)
- Glottolog: kwis1235
- Guthrie code: R.102

Culturally they have been strongly influenced by the Kuvale, and speak the Kuvale dialect of Herero. There may, however, have been a few elderly speakers of an unattested Kwisi language (a.k.a. Kwisi, Mbundyu, Kwandu) in the 1960s.
