= Kavango – Southwest Bantu languages =

Group of Bantu languages

Kavango – Southwest Bantu
- Geographic distribution: E Angola, W Zambia
- Linguistic classification: Niger–Congo?: Atlantic–Congo; Volta-Congo; Benue–Congo; Bantoid; Southern Bantoid; Bantu; Kavango – Southwest Bantu
- Subdivisions: Kavango; Southwest Bantu

Language codes
- Glottolog: kune1234

The Kavango – Southwest Bantu languages are a group of Bantu languages established by Anita Pfouts (2003). The Southwest Bantu languages constitute most of Guthrie's Zone R. The languages, or clusters, along with their Guthrie identifications, are:

- Kavango (K30)
  - Kwangali
  - Gciriku (Manyo)
  - ? Mashi, Simaa, Mbowe, Shanjo, Kwangwa
- Southwest Bantu
  - Ovambo (R20): Kwanyama, Ndonga, Kwambi, Ngandyera, Mbalanhu
  - Khumbi (Ngumbi, R10)
  - ? Ndombe
  - Nyaneka (R10)
  - Ngambwe (ex-Nyaneka dialect)
  - Hakaona (ex-Herero dialect)
  - Herero (R30): Herero, Zemba

Though not explicitly classified, Ndombe (R10) is presumably SW Bantu, and Mashi, Simaa (K30) Kavango. Maho (2009) adds Mbowe, Shanjo, and Kwangwa, as well as splitting off several varieties of these as distinct languages, such as Kuvale (R30 > R10). However, Mbukushu, Luyana, and Yeyi, sometimes included with these languages, appear to be more divergent lineages of Bantu.

Previous, and more extensive, versions (Nurse 2003) included K10 Chokwe–Luchazi, L10 Pende, L50 Lunda, L60 Nkoya, H21 Kimbundu, the rest of R (Umbundu, Yeyi), and perhaps L21 Kete, L22 Lwalu, H13b Suundi.

Maho (2009) differentiates Herero proper, R.31, from North-West Herero (Kaokoland Herero, including Zemba and presumably Hakaona), R.311, and Botswana Herero (including Mahalapye Herero), R.312. Kuvale is moved to zone R.10 as R.101.
