= Angolans in the United Kingdom =

Angolan diaspora in the UK

Angolans in the United Kingdom Angolanos no Reino Unido
Total population
- 20,529 (2021/22 census)

Regions with significant populations
- London, North-West England, West Midlands

Languages
- Portuguese, English and various other languages of Angola

Religion
- Primarily Christianity, with some Islam

Angolans people in the United Kingdom includes British citizens and non-citizen immigrants and expatriates of Angolan descent in the United Kingdom.

== Demographics ==
The 2001 Census recorded 5,914 Angolan-born people residing in the UK. According to the 2011 UK Census, there were 14,086 Angolan-born residents in England, 167 in Wales, 314 in Scotland, and 52 in Northern Ireland. Of this total of 14,619 Angolan-born residents, 8,263 lived in Greater London, 1,331 in North West England and 924 in the West Midlands.

In the 2021 UK census, 19,453 people in England were recorded as having been born in Angola, as well as 264 in Wales, and 160 in Northern Ireland. The census in Scotland was delayed by a year until 2022 and recorded 652 residents born in Angola.
