= Mbowe language =

Bantu language spoken in Zambia

Mbowe
- Esimbowe
- Native to: Zambia
- Region: Okavango River
- Native speakers: 460 (2010 census)
- Language family: Niger–Congo?: Atlantic–Congo; Benue–Congo; Southern Bantoid; Bantu (Zone K); Kavango? (or maybe Luyana); Mbowe

Language codes
- ISO 639-3: mxo
- Glottolog: mbow1246
- Guthrie code: K.32
- ELP: Mbowe

Mbowe (Esimbowe) is a Bantu language of Zambia.

Maho (2009) lists K.321 Mbume and K.322 Liyuwa as distinct but closely related languages. Mbowe had once been classified as a dialect of the divergent Luyana language.
