= Ovambo language =

Bantu language

Owambo
- Oshiwambo
- Native to: Angola, Namibia
- Ethnicity: Owambo
- Native speakers: (1,441,000 cited 1990)
- Language family: Niger–Congo?: Atlantic–Congo; Volta–Congo languages; Benue–Congo; Bantoid languages; Southern Bantoid; Bantu; Kavango – Southwest; Southwest Bantu; Owambo
- Standard forms: Kwanyama; Ndonga

Official status
- Official language in: Namibia

Language codes
- ISO 639-3: Variously: kua – Kwanyama ndo – Ndonga kwm – Kwambi lnb – Mbalanhu (Central Wambo) nne – Ngandjera
- Glottolog: ndon1253
- Guthrie code: R.20 (R.21–24,211–218,241–242)

Ambo
- Person: Omuwambo
- People: Aawambo, Ovawambo
- Language: Oshiwambo
- Country: Owambo, Ouwambo

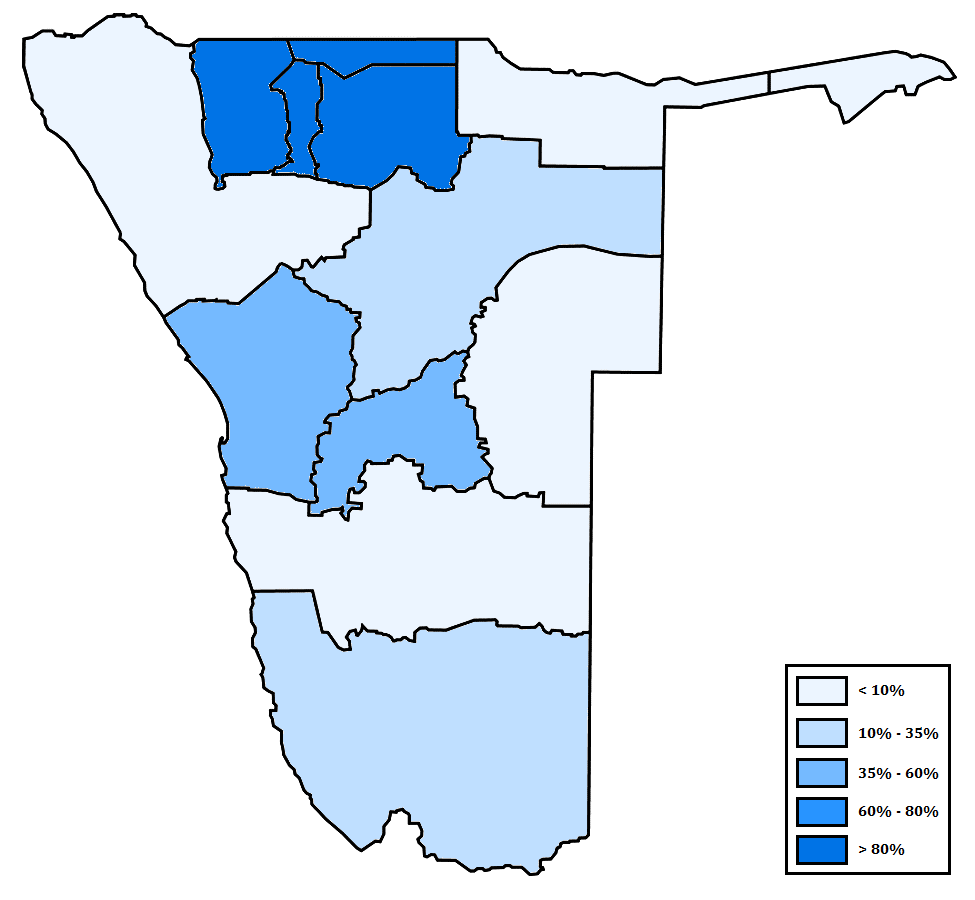
Modern-day distribution of Oshiwambo speakers in Namibia

An Ovambo speaker, recorded in Namibia.

The Ovambo (English: /ɒˈvæmboʊ/) language or Oshiwambo, also known as the Namibian language, is a dialect cluster spoken by the Ovambo people in southern Angola and northern Namibia, of which the written standards are Kwanyama and Ndonga.

The native name for the language is Oshiwambo (also written Oshivambo), which is also used specifically for the Kwanyama and Ndonga dialects. It is the largest spoken local language in Namibia, particularly by the Ovambo people.

The language is closely related to that of the Herero and Himba, the Herero language (Otjiherero). An obvious sign of proximity is the prefix used for language and dialect names, Proto-Bantu *ki- (class 7, as in the name of the Swahili language, Kiswahili), which in Herero has evolved to Otji- and in Ovambo further to Oshi-.

== History ==
After Namibia's independence in 1990, the area previously known as Ovamboland was divided into the Ohangwena, Omusati, Oshana and Oshikoto Regions. The population, estimated at between 700,000 and 750,000, fluctuates remarkably. This is because of the indiscriminate border drawn up by the Portuguese and German Empires during colonial rule, which cut through the Oukwanyama tribal area, placing some in Angola and others in Namibia. This results in regular cross-border movement.

There are approximately one million Oshiwambo speakers in Namibia and Angola. Though it is mainly spoken in the northern regions of Namibia, it is widely spoken across the rest of the country by populations of migrant workers from Ovamboland. These workers comprise a large part of the population in many towns, particularly in the south, where there are jobs in the mining industry. For example, in Lüderitz, an 18-hour drive from Ovamboland, at least 50% of the population speaks Oshiwambo.

== Name ==
The names Ambo and Ovambo appear to have originally been exonyms. Despite extensive speculation, their origin remains unknown.

The country was called Ovamboland and Amboland by the German colonial authorities. In English, Ovamboland predominates, though Ambo country is sometimes used, and in English publications from Namibia, Owamboland, Wamboland, and Owambo are seen. The endemic forms are Owambo kingdoms are Ndonga, Kwanyama and Kwambi.

The people are generally called the Ovambo or Ambo in English. The endemic forms are Aawambo (Ndonga) and Ovawambo (Kwanyama); the singular in both cases is Omuwambo. The language is generally called Ovambo, Ambo, or Oshiwambo in English; the endonym in both standards is Oshiwambo.

== Ovambo tribes and dialects ==
There are eight dialects, including the two written standards Kwanyama and Ndonga. Oshiwambo culture is more dominant in the northern part of the country.

The following table contains the names, areas, dialect names and the locations of the Ovambo dialects according to T. E. Tirronen's Ndonga-English Dictionary. The table also contains information concerning which noun class of Proto-Bantu the words belong to.

Area	Tribe	Dialect	Location
Classes 9 (*ny > on-), 11 (uu-/ou-)	Class 2 (*wa-, a-)	Class 7 (*ki > oshi-)	
Ondonga	Aa-ndonga	Ndonga dialect	Southern Ovamboland
Uu-kwambi	Aa-kwambi	Kwambi dialect	Central Ovamboland
O-ngandjera	Aa-ngandjera	Otshi-ngandjera	Central Ovamboland
Uu-kwaluudhi	Aa-kwaluudhi	Otshi-kwaluudhi	Western Ovamboland
O-mbalantu	Aa-mbalantu	Oshi-mbalantu	Western Ovamboland
Uu-kolonkadhi	Aa-kolonkadhi	Otshi-kolonkadhi	Western Ovamboland
Oukwanyama	Ova-kwanyama	Kwanyama dialect	Northern and Eastern Ovamboland, Angola
Eunda	Unda	Oshi-unda	northwest, Epalela vicinity

Maho (2009) lists the following as distinct languages in the Ovambo cluster:

- Ovambo
  - Kwanyama
    - Kafima
    - Evale
    - Mbandja
    - Mbalanhu
    - Ndongwena
    - Kwankwa
    - Dombondola
    - Esinga
  - Ndonga
  - Kwambi
  - Ngandjera
  - Kwaluudhi
    - Kolonkadhi-Eunda

== Sample text in Ovambo (Kwanyama) ==
Omupangi umwe okwa li a nyeka nge embo olo, ndele ta lesha oshipalanyole shalo, nokupula nge ta kondjifa ngeenge ohandi ka ninga umwe womEendombwedi daJehova ile hasho.

Translation

A nurse grabbed the book from me, looked at the cover, and demanded to know whether I was going to become one of Jehovah's Witnesses.
