= Mashi language =

Bantu language spoken in Zambia and Angola

Mashi
- Native to: Zambia and Angola
- Native speakers: (22,000 cited 2000–2010)
- Language family: Niger–Congo?: Atlantic–Congo; Benue–Congo; Southern Bantoid; Bantu; Kavango–Southwest?; Kavango?; Mashi
- Dialects: Mashi; North Kwandu; South Kwandu

Language codes
- ISO 639-3: Either: mho – Mashi xdo – Kwandu
- Glottolog: mash1267
- Guthrie code: K.34

Mashi (Kamaxi), or Kwandu, is a Bantu language of Zambia and Angola. It was assigned by Guthrie to Bantu group K.30, which Pfouts (2003) established as part of the Kavango–Southwest branch of Bantu. Though not specifically addressed, Mashi may be in that family as well.
