= Nkumbi language =

Bantu language spoken in Angola

Nkumbi
- Khumbi
- Native to: Angola
- Native speakers: (150,000 cited 1996)
- Language family: Niger–Congo?: Atlantic–Congo; Benue–Congo; Bantoid; Bantu; Kavango–Southwest; Southwest Bantu; Nkumbi

Language codes
- ISO 639-3: khu
- Glottolog: nkhu1238
- Guthrie code: R.14

Nkumbi, Humbe, Khumbi, or Muhumbi is a Bantu language of Angola.
