= Nyaneka language =

Language

Nyaneka
- Lunyaneka, Olunyaneka
- Native to: Angola
- Region: Huila, Namibia, Namibe, Luanda, Benguela etc. . .
- Native speakers: 1.6 million (2024)
- Language family: Niger–Congo?: Atlantic–Congo; Benue–Congo; Bantoid; Bantu; Kavango–Southwest; Southwest Bantu; Nyaneka

Language codes
- ISO 639-3: nyk
- Glottolog: nyan1305
- Guthrie code: R.13

Nyaneka or Haneca is a Bantu language of Angola. The Ngambwe "dialect" is now considered a distinct language.

== Phonology ==
=== Consonants ===
		Labial	Alveolar	Post-alv./ Palatal	Velar	Glottal
Nasal		m	n	ɲ	ŋ	
Plosive/ Affricate	voiceless	p	t	tʃ ~ c	k	
Plosive/ Affricate	prenasal vl.	ᵐ̥pʰ	ⁿ̥tʰ	ᶮ̥tʃ ~ ᶮ̥c	ᵑ̥kʰ	
Plosive/ Affricate	prenasal vd.	ᵐb	ⁿd	ᶮdʒ ~ ᶮɟ	ᵑɡ	
Fricative	voiceless	f	s			
Fricative	voiced	v ~ ʋ				ɦ
Approximant		v ~ ʋ		j	w	
Lateral			l			

Consonants are palatalized when in combination with /j/;
/pʲ, tʲ, vʲ~ʋʲ, nʲ, lʲ, ᵐ̥pʰʲ, ⁿ̥tʰʲ, ᵑ̥kʰʲ, ⁿdʲ/.

Consonants are labialized when in combination with /w/;
/pʷ, tʷ, nʷ, lʷ, ᵐ̥pʰʷ, ⁿ̥tʰʷ, ᵑ̥kʰʷ, ᵐbʷ/.

- /s/ is heard as [ʃ] in the dialects spoken in Quilenges, Chilenge.
- Affricate sounds /tʃ, ᶮ̥tʃ, ᶮdʒ/ may also range to palatal plosive sounds [c, ᶮ̥c, ᶮɟ] in free variation among speakers.
- /v/ may also be heard as a labio-dental approximant [ʋ] in free variation.

=== Vowels ===
	Front	Central	Back
High	i		u
Mid	e		o
Low		a	

== Sample text ==
SAMPLE TEXT

Okulikuambela apeho,” oyo onkhalelo tupondola okulekesa okuti tuna ekolelo liotyotyili

TRANSLATION

To “pray constantly” in this way shows we have genuine faith
