= Ngoya language =

Language of Angola

Ngoya
- Kibala
- Ipala
- Native to: Angola
- Region: northeast Cuanza Sul Province
- Native speakers: 100,000 (2013)
- Language family: Niger–Congo?: Atlantic–Congo; Benue–Congo; Southern Bantoid; Bantu; (transitional between zones Zone H and Zone R); Ngoya

Official status
- Recognised minority language in: Angola

Language codes
- ISO 639-3: None (mis)
- Glottolog: None
- Guthrie code: none

Ngoya, also known as Pala (Kibala, Ipala), is a newly recognized language of Angola that since ca. 2010 has been used for national radio broadcasts. It had previously been considered a dialect of Kimbundu without any linguistic evidence, and appears to be transitional between Kimbundu and Umbundu.

Nyoya is spoken in Cuanza Sul between Songo to the north and Umbundu to the south.

The name "Ngoya" is an Umbundu word meaning "savage". The endonym is Pala, which with the noun-class-7 prefix is Íipàlà. It is frequently rendered as Kibala, which is the Kimbundu form.
