= Tjimba people =

Namibian/Angolan ethnic group

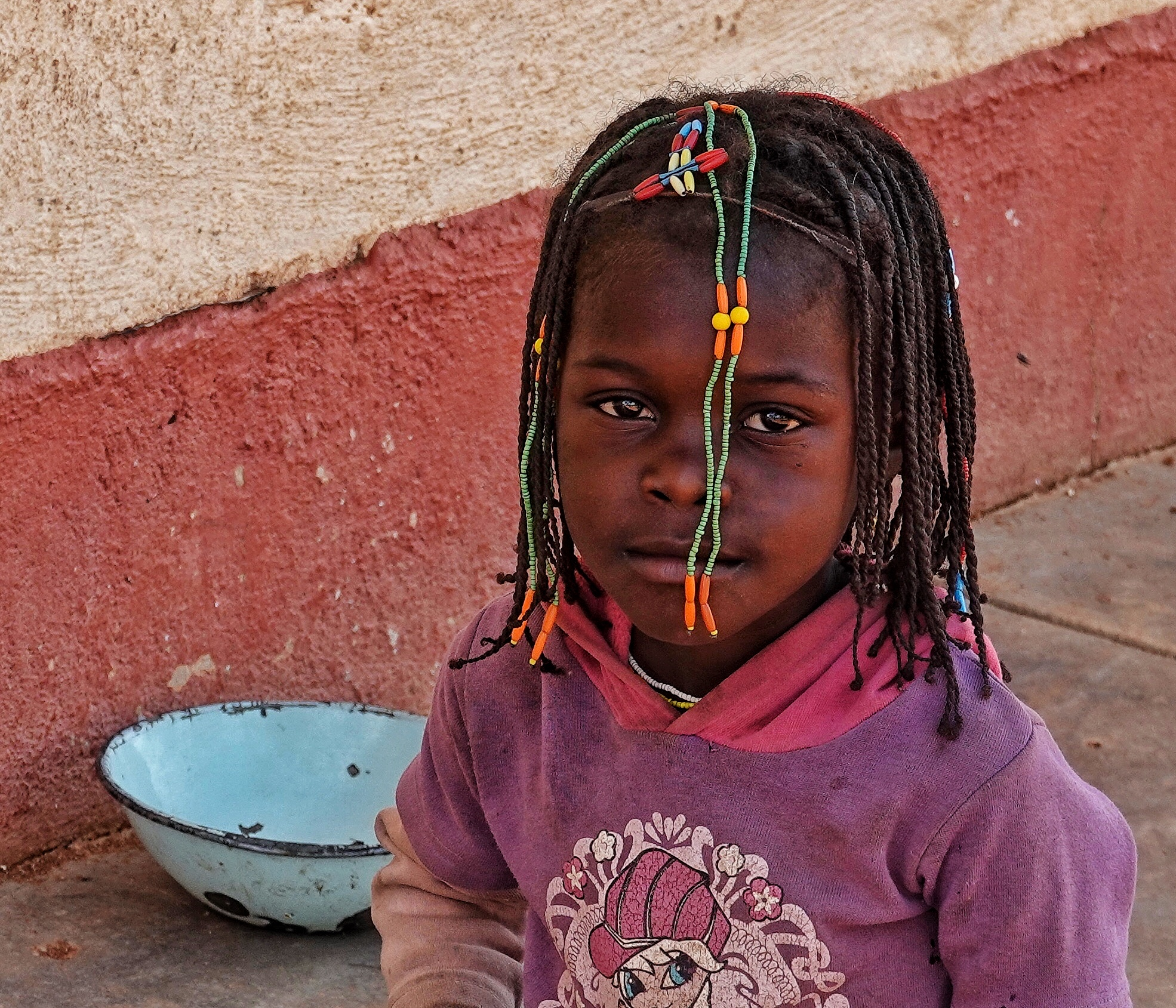
- Tjimba child

Regions with significant populations
- Kaokoveld Desert of northwest Namibia and southwest Angola

Languages
- Herero

Religion
- Traditional African religions

Related ethnic groups
- Himba; Herero; Damara

The Tjimba (IPA: [tʃimba]), also spelled Cimba, are a remote, Herero-speaking hunter-gatherer people of the Kaokoveld desert in northwest Namibia and southwest Angola, in the mountain ranges bordering the Kunene River. They continue to use stone tools, and use Adenium boehmianum to poison their arrows.

Their Herero neighbors portray the Tjimba as Herero who have lost their cattle and are therefore impoverished, but they are a distinct people, both culturally and physically. According to British anthropologist Roger Blench, they are physically remnant of an indigenous population of a southern African type—along with the Kwadi, the Kwisi, and the Damara—that are unlike either the San (Bushmen) or the Bantu Herero. The mitochondrial DNA of Tjimba who have been genetically tested is similar to that of Himba, Herero, and Damara, suggesting that they descend (at least maternally) from the same Bantu ancestors.
