= Sama language (Angola) =

Bantu language of Angola

Sama
- Quissama
- Native to: Angola
- Native speakers: (24,000 cited 2000)
- Language family: Niger–Congo?: Atlantic–Congo; Benue–Congo; Bantoid; Bantu (Zone H); Kimbundu (H.20) ?; Sama

Language codes
- ISO 639-3: smd (deprecated)
- Glottolog: sama1300
- Guthrie code: H.22
- IETF: kmb-AO

Sama is a Bantu language of Angola that appears to be closely related to Kimbundu.
