= Kwadi language =

Extinct Khoisan language of Angola

Kwadi
- ǃKwaǀtse
- Native to: Angola
- Ethnicity: Kwadi
- Extinct: 1960s-80s
- Language family: Khoe–Kwadi: Kwadi
- Dialects: Zorotua

Language codes
- ISO 639-3: kwz
- Glottolog: kwad1244

Kwadi /ˈkwɑːdi/ is an extinct "click language" once spoken in the southwest corner of Angola. It became extinct around 1960. There were only fifty Kwadi in the 1950s, of whom only 4–5 were competent speakers of the language. Three partial speakers were known in 1965, but in 1981 no speakers could be found. Salvage work was carried out in 2014 with two rememberers who had acquired the language from an old speaker while they were children.

Although Kwadi is poorly attested, there is enough data to show that it is a divergent member of the Khoe family, or perhaps cognate with the Khoe languages in a Khoe–Kwadi family. It preserved elements of proto-Khoe that were lost in the western Khoe languages under the influence of Kxʼa languages in Botswana, and other elements that were lost in the eastern Khoe languages.

The Kwadi people, called Kwepe (Cuepe) by the Bantu, appear to have been a remnant population of southwestern African hunter-gatherers, otherwise only represented by the Cimba, Kwisi, and the Damara, who adopted the Khoekhoe language. Like the Kwisi they were fishermen, on the lower reaches of the Coroca River.

Kwadi was alternatively known by varieties of the words Koroka (Ba-koroka, Curoca, Ma-koroko, Mu-coroca) and Cuanhoca. Zorotua, or Vasorontu, was apparently a dialect.

== Phonology ==
=== Vowels ===
Kwadi is tentatively reconstructed as having the seven oral vowels /a ɛ e i ɔ o u/ the three nasal vowels /ã ĩ ũ/. Diphthongs seem to have been (/ai/), /ao/, /au/, /oa/, /oe/, /oɛ/, /ua/, /ui/ and /ãĩ/, /ũã/. The status of /ao/ is not certain, and /oa/, /ua/ may have been allophones.

=== Tones ===
The tone system is unclear, due to limited data and to the poor quality of recordings. At least two tones (high and low) are necessary to explain that data:

[ʔáú] 'dog', [ʔáù] 'fish'
[k’ó] 'meat', [k’ò] 'man, male'

=== Consonants ===
The following consonants are attested. Those is parentheses are doubtful: they are either found in only a single lexeme, or are plausible allophones of another consonant.

		Labial	Dental	Alveolar	Lateral	Palatal	Velar	Uvular	Glottal
Click	voiceless		ᵏǀ		ᵏǁ	ᵏǂ			
Click	aspirated		ᵏǀʰ						
Click	glottalized		ᵏǀˀ			ᵏǂˀ			
Click	prenasal		ŋǀ						
Click	fricative		ᵏǀx						
Nasal		m		n		ɲ	ŋ		
Prenasal		mb		nd		ɲɟ	ŋɡ		
Stop	voiceless	p, pʲ		t, tsʷ		c	k, kʷ	(q)	ʔ, ʔʲ
Stop	voiced	b		d, dʷ		ɟ	ɡ, ɡʷ		
Stop	aspirated	pʰ		tʰ		cʰ	k(x)ʰ		
Stop	glottalized			tʼ		cʼ	k(x)ʼ		
Affricate	voiceless	(pf)		ts~tʃ	tɬ		(kx)		
Affricate	voiced			dz					
Affricate	aspirated			tsʰ	tɬʰ				
Affricate	glottalized			tsʼ	tɬʼ			qχʼ	
Fricative	voiceless	f	(θ)	s	ɬ	ʃ	x	χ	h
Fricative	voiced	v	(ð)						
Fricative	glottalized						xʼ		
Trill				(r)				ʀ̥	
Approximant		w			l	j			

Proto-Khoe–Kwadi *ǃ, *ǂ, *ǁ are replaced with non-click consonants such as /c, tɬ, cʼ, tɬʼ, xʼ, ʔʲ/.

In disyllabic words, the second consonant is predominantly /m/, /n/, /l/, /d/, /b/, and it is possible those were the only consonants allowed within morphemes in native words, as would be typical for the area.

== Morphology ==
=== Pronouns ===
Kwadi has personal pronouns for first and second person in singular, dual, and plural numbers. Pronouns have subject, object, and possessive cases. 1st person plural may have distinguished clusivity. Object pronouns are suffixed with -le/-de, except for the first person dual object pronoun, which is just mu. Possessive pronouns are the same as the subject form, except for the first person singular possessive pronoun, which is tʃi. Third person pronouns are simply the demonstratives, which are formed with a demonstrative base ha- followed by a gender/number suffix.

Personal Pronouns
		singular	dual	plural
1st		ta	ʔamu ~ hamu	ʔala (EXCL) ʔuhina, hina (INCL?)
2nd		sá	uwa ~ huwa	ʔu ~ hu
3rd	masc	háde	hawa	hau
3rd	fem	hɛɛ (< ha-e)	hawa	haʔe

The known possessive pronouns are tʃi 'my' and ha 'his'. From the Khoe languages, it's not expected that all pronouns had distinctive possessive forms.

=== Nouns ===
Kwadi nouns distinguished three genders (masculine, feminine, and common), as well as three numbers (singular, dual, and plural). Some nouns form their plural with suppletion. For example: tçe "woman" vs. tala kwaʼe "women". The attested paradigm of nominal suffixes for masculine and feminine nouns is given below.

	singular	dual	plural
Masculine	-dɛ	-wa	-u
Feminine	-e	-wa	-ʔɛ
Common	-(n)dɛ	-wa	-ʔV

== See also ==
- Kwisi people
