= Ndonga =

Dialect in Namibia

Oshindonga
- Oshindonga
- Native to: Namibia and southern Angola
- Region: Ovamboland
- Native speakers: 810,000 (2006)
- Language family: Niger–Congo?: Atlantic–Congo; Benue–Congo; Southern Bantoid; Bantu; Kavango–Southwest; Southwest Bantu; Ovambo; Oshindonga

Language codes
- ISO 639-1: ng
- ISO 639-2: ndo
- ISO 639-3: ndo
- Glottolog: ndon1254
- Guthrie code: R.22
- Linguasphere: 99-AUR-lc

Oshindonga, is a Bantu dialect spoken in Namibia and parts of Angola. It is a standardized dialect of the Ovambo language, and is mutually intelligible with Kwanyama, the other Ovambo dialect with a standard written form. With 810,000 speakers, the language has the largest number of speakers in Namibia.

Martti Rautanen translated the Bible into the Oshindonga dialect. Beginning his work in 1885, he published the New Testament in 1903, but it took until 1920 to finish the Old Testament. His Bible translation became the basis of a standardized form of Ndonga.

== Phonology ==
=== Vowels ===
Oshindonga uses a five-vowel system:

	Front	Back
Close	i	u
Mid	e	o
Open	a	

=== Consonants ===
Oshindonga contains the following consonant phonemes:

		Labial	Dental	Alveolar	Palatal	Velar	Glottal
Nasal	voiceless	m̥		n̥		ŋ̊	
Nasal	voiced	m		n	ɲ	ŋ	
Plosive	voiceless	p		t		k	ʔ
Plosive	voiced	b		d		g	
Plosive	affricate			ts			
Fricative	voiceless	f	θ	s	ʃ	x	h
Fricative	voiced	v	ð	z	ʒ	ɣ	
Approximant	median	w			j		
Approximant	lateral			l			

Prenasalized sounds are listed below:

- [m̥p], [mb], [ɱv], [n̥θ], [nð], [n̥ʃ], [n̥t], [nd], [nz], [n̥ts], [ŋk], [ŋɡ]

Oshindonga also contains many other consonant compounds, listed below:

- [m̥pʰ], [n̥tʰ], [n̥kʰ], [m̥pʰw], [n̥tʰw], [n̥kʰw], [n̥dz], [n̥tsʰ], [ndʒ], [xw], [tsʼ] (voiceless, ejective, alveolar affricate), [psʲ] (voiceless, palatalized, labio-alveolar affricate)

=== Tones ===
Oshidonga has two tones: high and low.
