= Kwanyama =

Dialect in Namibia

- Oshikwanyama
- Native to: Angola and Namibia
- Region: Cunene Province (Angola), Ovamboland (Namibia)
- Native speakers: 1,003,783 in Angola (2024); 250,000 in Namibia (2006)
- Language family: Niger–Congo?: Atlantic–Congo; Volta-Congo; Benue–Congo; Bantoid; Southern Bantoid; Bantu; Kavango–Southwest; Southwest Bantu; Ovambo; Kwanyama

Language codes
- ISO 639-1: kj
- ISO 639-2: kua
- ISO 639-3: kua
- Glottolog: kuan1247
- Guthrie code: R.21
- Linguasphere: 99-AUR-la

Kwanyama (Portuguese: Cuanhama) is a national language of Angola and Namibia. It is a standardized dialect of the Ovambo language, and is mutually intelligible with Oshindonga, the other Ovambo dialect with a standard written form.

The entire Christian Bible has been translated into Kwanyama and was first published in 1974 under the name Ombibeli by the South African Bible Society. Jehovah's Witnesses released a translation of the new testament, the New World Translation of the Christian Greek Scriptures in Kwanyama in 2019, both printed and electronic online version.

== Phonology ==
Consonants
		Labial	Alveolar	Palatal	Velar	Glottal
Plosive	voiceless	p	t~t̪	tʃ	k	
Plosive	voiced	b	d~d̪	dʒ		
Plosive	prenasal	ᵐb	ⁿd	ⁿdʒ	ᵑɡ	
Fricative	voiceless	f	(s)	ʃ	x	h
Fricative	voiced	v				
Nasal	voiced	m	n	ɲ		
Nasal	voiceless	m̥	n̥	ɲ̊	ŋ̊	
Approximant		w	l	j		

/t/ and /d/ are dentalized when followed by a front vowel /i/. An /s/ sound can only occur in loanwords.

Vowels
	Front	Back
Close	i	u
Mid	e	o
Open	a	

Tones

Kwanyama has two tones : high and low.

== Grammar ==
=== Verbs ===
Verbs are inflected for two tenses: present and non-present. There is a mandatory subject concord before verbs, indicating person, tense, and negation. Verbs are divided into two categories, active and stative, each of which have different subject concords. The future tense in active verbs is indicated by inserting the auxiliary ka after the nonpast subject concord.

Kwanyama subject concords
Active				Stative				
Person	Negation	Past	Nonpast	Person	Negation	Past	Present	Future
1S	+	Onda	Ohandi/Ohai	1S	+	Onda li ndi	Ondi	Ohandi ka kala ndi
1S	-	Inandi	Itandi	1S	-	Kandi li ndi	Kandi/ Nghi	Itandi ka kala ndi
2S	+	Owa	Oto	2S	+	Owa li u	Ou	Oto ka kala u
2S	-	Ino	Ito	2S	-	Kwa li u	Ku	Ito ka kala u
3S	+	Okwa	Ota	3S	+	Okwa li e	oku	Ota ka kala e
3S	-	Ina	Ita	3S	-	Ka li e	Ke	Ita ka kala e
1P	+	Otwa	Ohatu	1P	+	Otwa li tu	Otu	Ohatu ka kala tu
1P	-	Inatu	Itatu	1P	-	Katwa li tu	Katu	Itatu ka kala tu
2P	+	Omwa	Otamu	2P	+	Omwa li mu	Omu	Otamu ka kala mu
2P	-	Inamu	Itamu	2P	-	Kamwa li mu	Kamu	Itamu ka kala mu
3P	+	Ova	Otaa/Otava	3P	+	Ova li ve	Ove	Otava ka kala ve
3P	-	Inaa/Inava	Itaa/Itava	3P	-	Kava li ve	Kave	Itava ka kala ve

Another way to negate a verb is to add the prefix ha- before the verb stem (ex. okwiimba 'to sing' -> okuhaimba 'to not sing').

== Bibliography ==
- Crane, Thera; Lindgren-Streicher, Karl; Wingo, Andy (2004). Hai ti! A Beginner's Guide to Oshikwanyama (PDF).
- Halme, Riikka (2004). A Tonal Grammar of Kwanyama. pp. 12-18.
- Zimmerman, W.; Hasheela, P. (1998). Oshikwanyama Grammar. Windhoek: Gamsberg Macmillan.
