= Zemba language =

Bantu language spoken in Angola and Namibia

Zemba
- Dhimba
- Native to: Angola, Namibia
- Ethnicity: Tjimba
- Native speakers: Angola: 18,000 (2011); Namibia: 7,000 (2016)
- Language family: Niger–Congo?: Atlantic–Congo; Benue–Congo; Bantoid; Bantu; Kavango–Southwest; Southwest Bantu; Zemba

Language codes
- ISO 639-3: dhm
- Glottolog: zemb1238
- Guthrie code: R.311
- ELP: Himba

Zemba or Dhimba is a Bantu language spoken mainly in Angola where the language has about 18,000 speakers, and also in Namibia with some 7,000. It is closely related to Herero, and is often considered a dialect of that language, especially as the Zemba are ethnically Herero.

There are various spellings and pronunciations of the name: Zimba, Dhimba, Tjimba, Chimba, etc. However, when spelled Tjimba or Chimba in English, it generally refers to the Tjimba people, non-Herero hunter-gatherers who speak Zemba. The spelling Himba should be distinguished from the Himba people and their dialect of Herero.

Ethnologue separates Zemba as a distinct language from Himba (Otjihimba, Ovahimba), classified as a dialect of Herero proper. Maho (2009), however, sets up a Northwest Herero language, which includes Zemba; from the map, it would appear to include Himba and Hakaona as well.
