= Kuvale language =

Bantu language spoken in Angola

Kuvale
- Native to: Angola
- Ethnicity: 70,000 (2015)
- Language family: Niger–Congo?: Atlantic–Congo; Benue–Congo; Bantoid; Bantu; Kavango–Southwest?; Southwest Bantu?; (?); Kuvale
- Writing system: Latin

Language codes
- ISO 639-3: Either: olu – Kuvale nql – Ngendelengo
- Glottolog: kuva1244 Kuvale ngen1257 Ngendelengo
- Guthrie code: R.101

Kuvale is a Southern Bantu language spoken in Angola, in the middle of a large Umbundu-speaking area. It has traditionally been considered a dialect of Herero; however, Maho (2009) has moved it from Bantu Zone R.30 to Zone R.10, which includes Umbundu and a few smaller languages. Ngendelengo may be a distinct language.
