= Nsongo language =

Bantu language spoken in Angola

Songo
- Nsongo
- Native to: Angola
- Native speakers: (50,000 cited 1978)
- Language family: Niger–Congo?: Atlantic–Congo; Benue–Congo; Bantoid; Bantu (Zone H.20); Kimbundu ? Teke–Mbere?; Songo

Language codes
- ISO 639-3: nsx
- Glottolog: nson1238
- Guthrie code: H.24

Songo (Nsongo) is a Bantu language of Angola. It is similar to North Mbundu, and is often considered a dialect of that language. The true relationship may be a regional influence since it has been suggested that Nsongo and Teke, and its relatives, are close (Nurse 2003).
