= La Chimba Airport =

- IATA: none; ICAO: SCMB

Summary
- Airport type: Defunct
- Serves: Antofagasta, Chile
- Elevation AMSL: 120 ft / 37 m
- Coordinates: 23°33′13″S 70°23′46″W

Map
- Location of La Chimba Airport in Chile

Runways
Direction	Length		Surface
Direction	ft	m	Surface
Closed
- Source: Google Maps OurAirports

La Chimba Airport (Spanish: Aeropuerto La Chimba, (ICAO: SCMB)) was an airport serving Antofagasta, capital of the Antofagasta Region of Chile.

Google Earth Historical Imagery (10/19/2002) shows the runway marked closed and criss-crossed by new streets. Subsequent imagery show the land filled by a housing project.

== See also ==
- Transport in Chile
- List of airports in Chile
