= Ndombe language =

Bantu language of Angola

Ndombe
- Native to: Angola
- Native speakers: (22,300 cited 2000)
- Language family: Niger–Congo?: Atlantic–Congo; Benue–Congo; Southern Bantoid; Bantu; Kavango–Southwest?; Southwest Bantu?; Ndombe

Language codes
- ISO 639-3: ndq
- Glottolog: ndom1244
- Guthrie code: R.12

Ndombe (Dombe) is a Bantu language of Angola. It was assigned by Guthrie to Bantu group R.10, which apart from Umbundu Pfouts (2003) established as part of the Kavango–Southwest branch of Bantu. Though not specifically addressed, Ndombe may be in that branch as well.

There is no standard form of Ndombe, nor an established writing system.
