= Herero language =

Bantu language of Namibia and Botswana

OvaHerero
- Otjiherero
- Native to: Namibia, Botswana, Angola
- Region: Kunene, Omaheke Region and Otjozondjupa Region in Namibia; Ghanzi in Botswana; Namibe, Huíla and Cunene in Angola
- Ethnicity: OshiHerero, Himba, Mbanderu, Tjimba, Kwisi, Twa
- Native speakers: 250,000 (2015–2018)
- Language family: Niger–Congo?: Atlantic–Congo; Volta-Congo; Benue–Congo; Bantoid; Southern Bantoid; Bantu; Kavango – Southwest Bantu; Southwest Bantu; Herero (R.30); OvaHerero
- Dialects: Himba; Kuvale; Zemba (Thimba, Otjizemba); Hakawona (Otjihakawona); Botswana Herero
- Writing system: Latin (OshiHerero alphabet); Herero Braille

Language codes
- ISO 639-1: hz Herero
- ISO 639-2: her Herero
- ISO 639-3: her Herero
- Glottolog: here1253 Herero
- Guthrie code: R.30 (R31,311,312); R.101 (Kuvale)
- ELP: Herero
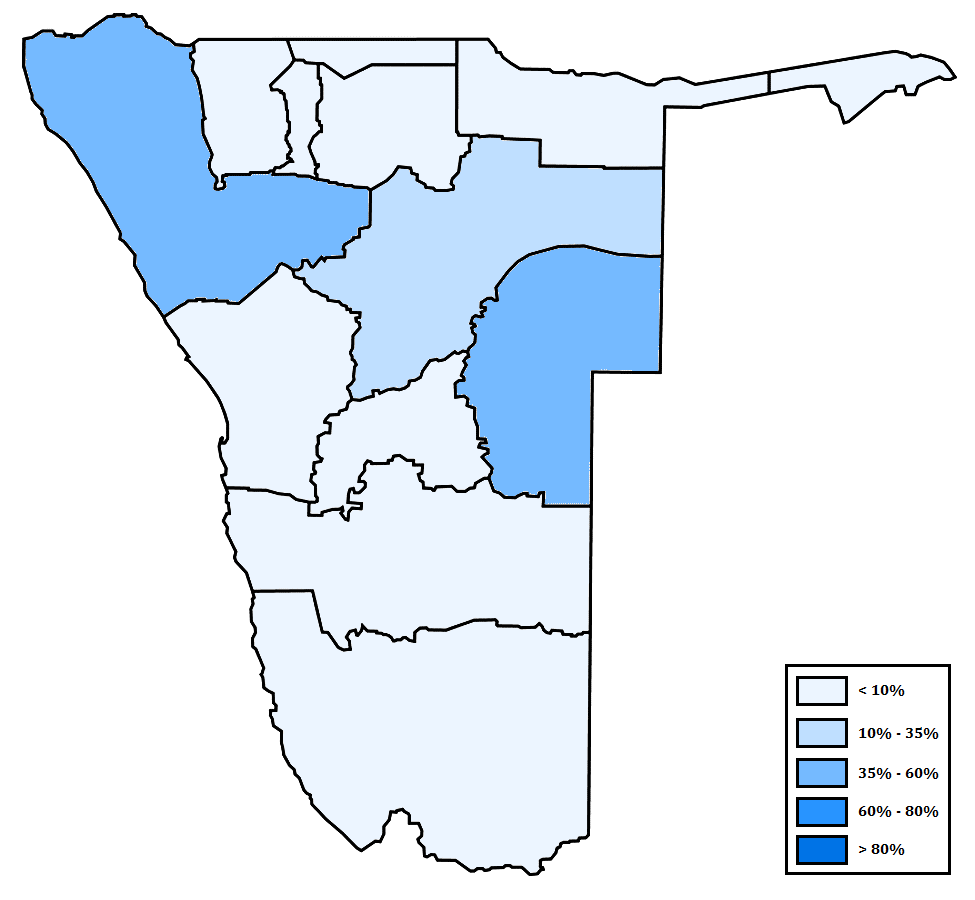
- The disparate distribution of the Herero language in Namibia, showing the concentration of Herero speakers on the Kalahari boundary in the east, as well as the outlying Herero-speaking Himba people of the Kaokoveld in the far north-west.

- Person: Omu- OmuHerero, OmuHimba, OmuMbanderu
- People: Ova- OvaHerero, OvaHimba, OvaMbanderu
- Language: Otji- OtjiHerero, OtjiHimba, OtjiMbanderu

A Herero speaker, recorded in Namibia.

Herero (Otjiherero) is a Bantu language spoken by the Herero and Mbanderu peoples in Namibia and Botswana, as well as by small communities of people in southwestern Angola. There were 250,000 speakers in these countries between 2015 and 2018.

== Distribution ==
Its linguistic distribution covers a zone called Hereroland, which is constituted of the region of Omaheke along with the Otjozondjupa and Kunene Regions. The Himba people, who are related to the Herero and Mbanderu, speak a dialect very close to Otjiherero. Many Herero-speakers live in Windhoek, the capital of Namibia.

== Phonology ==
=== Consonants ===
| | | Labial | Dental | Alveolar | Palatal | Velar | Glottal |
|---|---|---|---|---|---|---|---|
| Nasal | | m | n̪ | n | ɲ | | |
| Plosive/ Affricate | plain | p | t̪ | t | tʃ | k | |
| Plosive/ Affricate | prenasal | ᵐb | ⁿd̪ | ⁿd | ⁿdʒ | ᵑɡ | |
| Fricative | voiceless | (f) | θ | (s) | | | h |
| Fricative | voiced | v | ð | | | | |
| Trill | | | | r | | | |
| Approximant | | w | | (l) | j | | |

The sounds /f s l/ are found in loanwords.

=== Vowels ===
| | Front | Central | Back |
|---|---|---|---|
| Close | i iː | | u uː |
| Mid | ɛ ɛː | | ɔ ɔː |
| Open | | ɑ ɑː | |

== Script ==
Because of the translation of missionary Gottlieb Viehe (1839–1901) of the Bible into Herero, at the end of the 19th century, the spoken language was transcribed to an alphabet based on the Latin script. Father Peter Heinrich Brincker (1836–1904) translated several theological works and songs.

== Education ==
Otjiherero is taught in Namibian schools both as a native tongue and as a secondary language. It is included as a principal material at the University of Namibia. Otjiherero is also one of the six minority languages that are used by the Namibian State Radio (NBC). Gamsberg Macmillan, as of 2008, has published the only dictionary in Otjiherero.

== Varieties ==
The Hakaona variety is now considered a separate Bantu language, as sometimes is Zemba (Otjizemba). Maho (200) also removes Kuvale to Bantu Zone R.10, while differentiating North-West Herero (Kaokoland Herero, including Zemba and presumably Himba and Hakaona), R.311, and Botswana Herero (including Mahalapye Herero), R.312, as distinct from but closely related to Herero proper. Within Herero proper, he recognizes two dialects: Central Herero and Mbandero (East Herero).

Northwest/Zemba is found on either side of the Namibian–Angolan border. Central Herero covers a large area in central Namibia, with East Herero and a few islands to the east but still in Namibia. Botswana Herero consists of a few scattered islands in Botswana, with about 15% of the population of Herero proper.

Ethnologue separates Zimba as a distinct language but retains Himba, East Herero, and Botswana Herero within the Herero language. However, it no longer recognizes Kuvale as a dialect but as a separate language.

== Sources ==
- Brincker, Peter Heinrich (1886, 1964). Wörterbuch und kurzgefasste Grammatik des Otji-Herero. Leipzig (reprint 1964 Ridgwood, NJ: The Gregg Press).
- Hahn, C. Hugo (1857). Grundzüge einer Grammatik des Hereró. Berlin: Verlag von Wilhelm Hertz.
- Lutz, Marten (2006). "Locative inversion in Otjiherero: more on morpho-syntactic variation in Bantu." In: Laura Downing, Lutz Marten & Sabine Zerbian (eds.), Papers in Bantu Grammar, ZAS Papers in Linguistics 43, 97–122.
- Marten, Lutz & Nancy C. Kula (2007). "Morphosyntactic co-variation in Bantu: two case studies." SOAS Working Papers in Linguistics 15.227-238.
- Möhlig, Wilhelm, Lutz Marten & Jekura U. Kavari (2002). A Grammatical Sketch of Herero (Otjiherero). Köln: Köppe (Grammatische Analysen afrikanischer Sprachen; v.19).
