= Mbunda =

Mbunda may refer to:

- Mbunda Kingdom (c. 1500–1917)
- Mbunda language
- Mbunda people
