= List of Mbunda Chiefs in Zambia =

Coordinates: 14°06′44″S 21°26′07″E

Mbunda people started migrating to Barotseland now Western Province of Zambia in the latter part of the 18th Century.

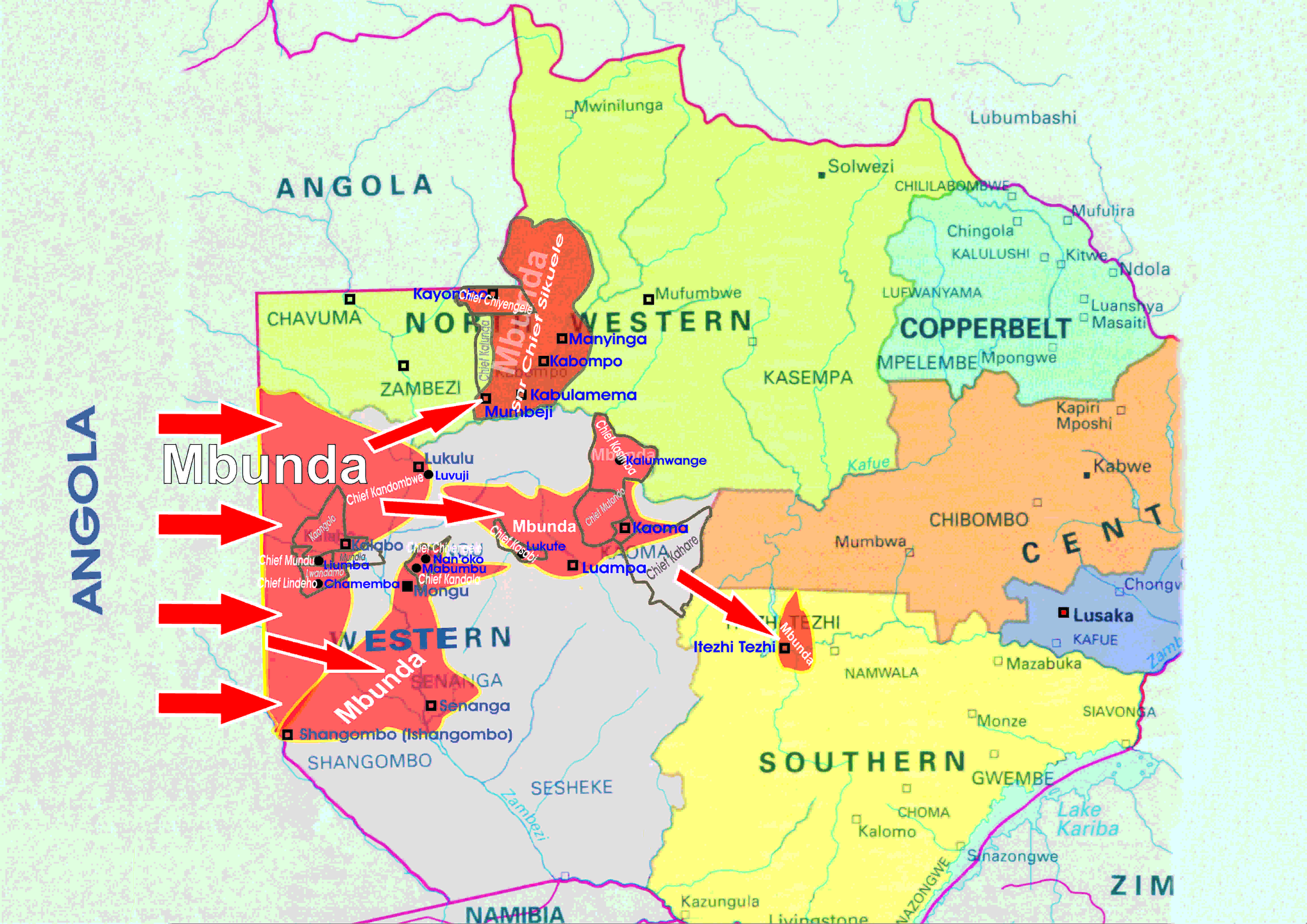
Mbunda people and their chiefs migration from Mbundaland in the now Angola into the now Zambia, since the latter part of the 18th Century

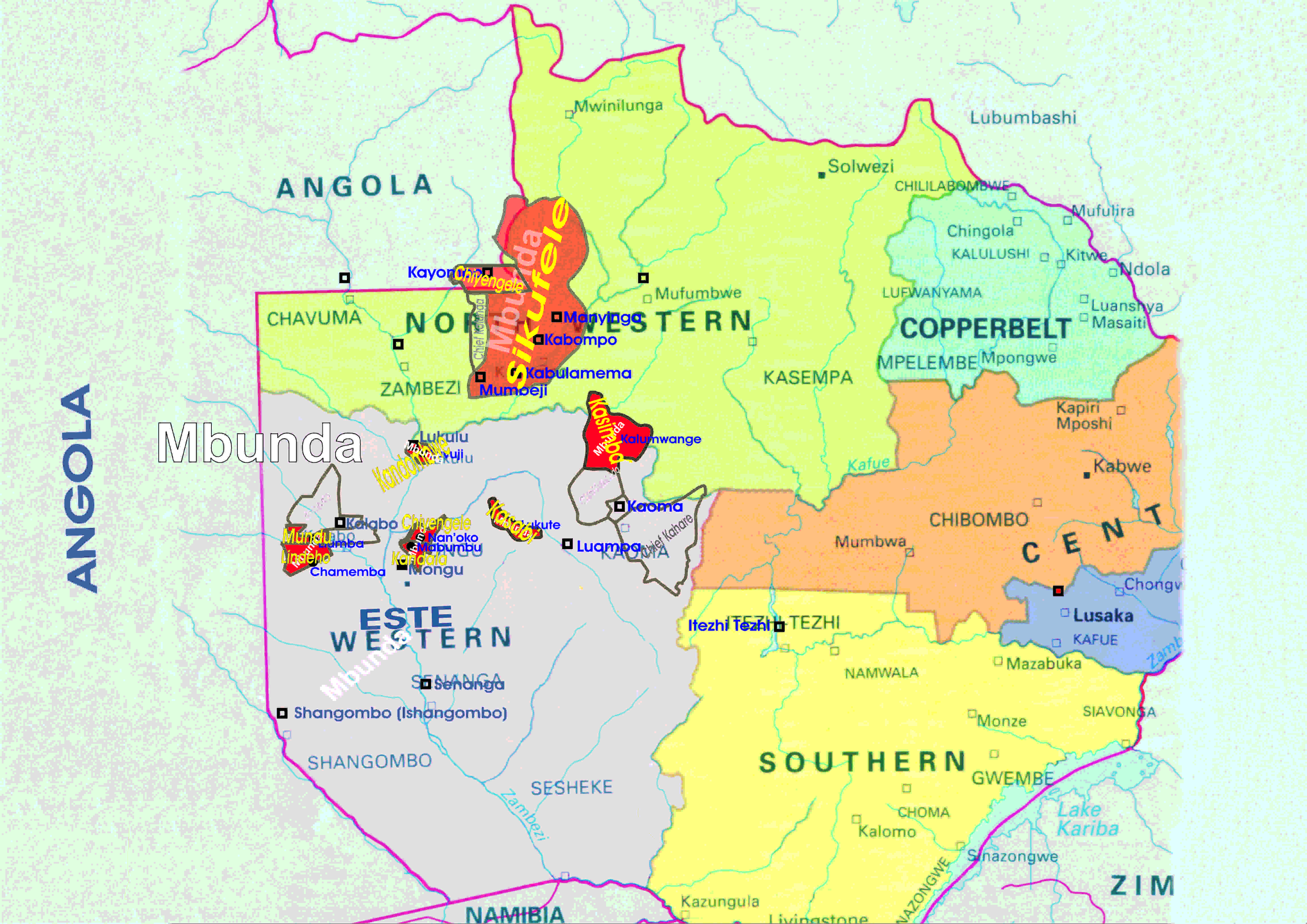
Mbunda chiefs location map in Zambia

The first Mbunda Chiefs to migrate were Chief Mundu of the Mbalango language, followed by his nephew Chief Kandala Viemba and then King Chitengi Chingumbe Chiyengele, in frustration after his succession to his father's throne, in opposition to the Mbunda custom of a nephew. The three were all received by the Aluyi King Mulambwa. Most of the Mbunda chiefs started migrating at the beginning of the 20th century due to the Mbunda resistance to Portuguese colonial occupation, when the Portuguese colonialists abducted the twenty first (21st) Mbunda Monarch, King Mwene Mbandu I Lyondthzi Kapova.

Due to the Mbunda/Aluyi interaction since the end of the 18th Century in Barotseland, the Mbunda named the Aluyi King Lubosi "Litunga Liwanika lya mafuti, Njamba kalimi, lifuti limulimina". This is a Mbunda name meaning, "Builder and Uniter of Nations" and depicting an Elephant (Njamba in Mbunda), a Mbunda monarch symbol. This was in recognition of King Lubosi's justice on discovery of the concealment of Aluyi fighters who killed Mbunda commanders after the Aluyi/Tonga war, for fear of the Mbunda getting the credit for the victory over the Tonga, and after the absorption of not only the conquered Makololo, but also the Mbunda immigrants, the Ndebele raiders and the ever-increasing European presence in Barotseland since 1864.

== Status of Mbunda Chiefs In Barotseland ==
Mbunda Chiefs and their people have continued to be subjective to the Barotse Royal Establishment. Negative reactions from different quarters between the two peoples could be attributed to lack of correct information of subject matters. Mbunda Chieftainships obtaining in Barotseland and elsewhere in Zambia are "Mbunda Institutions" which would not be substituted, and will remain in existence even when a chief in a person is dethroned, by replacement of another Mbunda from the same royal family tree.

Interactive approaches by the 23rd Mbunda Monarch, His Majesty King Mbandu III Mbandu Lifuti of Angola to his counterpart the 24th King of Barotseland, His Majesty Lubosi Imwiko II, in appreciating the time long co-existence with his people and for the continued cordial relationship between the two peoples indicate exemplary statesmanship. Whereas parallel structures of introducing a Mbunda Royal Council or Establishment in Barotseland has never been considered by the Mbunda Monarch in Angola, however, the Mbunda Chiefs in Zambia and Barotseland in particular, having to be installed by the Mbunda Monarch in Angola, while maintaining their subjectivity to the Litunga, for those in Barotseland as practiced in like manner by the Paramount Chief Undi of the Chewa people of Zambia, Malawi and Mozambique would help preserve the Mbunda culture and traditions.

Traditional Mbundaland in Angola recognize chieftainship of all migrant ethnicity living in the land and continue living with them all in harmony, while paying allegiance to their central chieftainship in their countries of origin. Equally, Mbunda people in the diaspora pay allegiance to the Mbunda Monarch in Angola, while recognizing and being subjective, but not subservient to authorities that be in the diaspora.

Following is a list of Mbunda chiefs in Zambia, who ascribe to the 23rd Mbunda monarch His Majesty, King Mwene Mbandu III Mbandu Lifuti in Lumbala Nguimbo, Moxico, Angola:

== Chief Mwene Mundu Dynasty ==
The first Mbunda Chiefs to settle in Bulozi were of the Mbunda language (Vambalango). The ancestor of the Mbunda Mbalango was a woman chief called Vamwene Nungu in Mbundaland now Angola. Not all of the children succeeded to chieftainship. Sometimes the succession followed Lozi custom as the Vambalango lived among the Lozi and tended to adopt Lozi customs.

Name	Lifespan	Reign start	Reign end	Notes	Family	Image
1. Chief Mwene Mundu Man'ulumbe	His Palace was at Liumba in Bulozi	1795	1800s	Chief Mwene Mundu Man'ulumbe, the son of Chieftaines Vamwene Mahongo was the first Mbunda Chief to visit Bulozi in the 17th century to interact with the Aluyi, King Yeta Twamona, a visit that resulted in their establishing a friendship. Thus the name Mwene Mundu is a title that is given to every Mbunda-Mbalango chief at Liumba, in Kalabo District, who succeeds to the chieftainship. After this visit, Chief Mwene Mundu returned to Mbundaland and shifted from his former palace and settled in Kapuyi. In his second visit to Bulozi he found King Yeta Twamona had died, and this time he met King Ngombala of the Aluyi people. Mbunda chief usually visited Bulozi from Mbundaland now Angola to visit Aluyi chiefs due to its proximity. When King Mulambwa was on his throne he remembered this Friendship which had existed between Chief Mwene Mundu and King Yeta Twamona. Therefore he also decided to strengthen the friendship between the Mbunda and the Aluyi. During the time of King Mulambwa in Bulozi, Chief Mwene Mundu's fame had grown so much that the King Mulambwa sent for him. Chief Mwene Mundu brought along with him ministers or vimyata on this third trip together with his sons and stayed for a while in a place called Kama in Bulozi. By this time Chief Mwene Mundu had decided to shift from Kapuyi, a river in Mbundaland now Angola into Bulozi. When he finally shifted to Bulozi he wanted to settle in Kama but did not because the soil was not good for agricultural purposes, thus he settled in Ndoka. Because he had come with a very large group of people they could not settle in one place; Chief Mwene Kakinga ka Chompe settled in Mbunde, Chief Mwene Nkando in Mayela, Chief Mwene Kalomo ka Chompe in Lukoela and Chief Mwene Mbambi in Mbambi. Others settled at Kamonga, Chisole, and some in Liande and even today there are remains of settlements such as old agricultural ridges and canals.	?	
2. Chief Mwene Mundu Muthzanga	His Palace was at Liumba in Bulozi	?	?	After the death of Chief Mwene Mundu Man'ulumbe, Chief Mwene Mundu Muthzanga reigned in his stead and reigned for many years and died.	?	
3. Chief Mwene Mundu Kalomo ka Chompe	His Palace was at Ndoka in Bulozi	?	?	Mwene Mundu Kalomo ka Chompe who settled in Lukoela reigned after Mwene Mundu Muzanga. During the reign of Mwene Mundu Kalomo ka Chompe, Mwene Kandala Vyemba, nephew to Mwene Mundu Man'ulumbe fled into Bulozi. When the Makololo went to war with the Aluyi, Chief Mwene Mundu Kalomo ka Chompe went back into Mbundaland to seek refuge and settled in Chishongo at the boundary with the Nyengoland. Some of his people such as Kavinga settled in N'inda and Kanyanyu settled in Lwati. After the war, during the reign of King Lewanika, messengers were sent to assure Chief Mwene Mundu Kalomo ka Chompe that there was peace in the area and that he could go back. Soon after this return he died.	?	
4. Chief Mwene Mundu Kaumba	His Palace was at Kalenga in Bulozi	?	?	During the war between the Aluyi and the Shukulumbwe (Ila and Tonga), Chief Mwene Mundu Kaumba was in Kalenga. He was a courageous fighter and with a combined army of the Aluyi had captured prisoners from the tribes of Tonga, Ila, Toka and Ndundulu. They were brought to Chief Mwene Mundu Kaumba's palace at Kalenga. Apart from being a great fighter, Chief Mwene Mundu Kaumba was a great magician (chimbanda) and he was well vested in magic arts. He died after the Aluyi/Luvale war (Chiyazengombe war).	?	
5. Chief Mwene Mundu Chimboma	His Palace was at Lwenga-Liumba in Bulozi	?	1907	After his death of Chief Mwene Mundu Kaumba, Mwene Mundu Chimboma was made Chief in his stead and he did not want to continue dwelling in Kalenga, thus he requested the King Lewanika to allow him shift from Kalenga to Lwenga-Lyumba. Chief Mwene Mundu Chimboma reigned for many more years and died.	?	
6. Chief Mwene Mundu Kalomo ka Chompe	His Palace was at Liumba in Bulozi	?	?	Mwene Mundu Kalomo ka Chompe who settled in Lukoela reigned after Mwene Mundu Muzanga. During the reign of Mwene Mundu Kalomo ka Chompe, Mwene Kandala Vyemba, nephew to Mwene Mundu Man'ulumbe fled into Bulozi. When the Makololo went to war with the Aluyi, Chief Mwene Mundu Kalomo ka Chompe went back into Mbundaland to seek refuge and settled in Chishongo at the boundary with the Nyengoland. Some of his people such as Kavinga settled in N'inda and Kanyanyu settled in Lwati. After the war, during the reign of King Lewanika, messengers were sent to assure Chief Mwene Mundu Kalomo ka Chompe that there was peace in the area and that he could go back. Soon after this return he died.	?	
7. Chief Mwene Mundu Chilindo	His Palace was at Liumba in Bulozi	1907	1951	After his death, Chief Mundu Chilindo was made Chief Mundu in his stead in 1907 the year people in Bulozi started paying pole tax. Chief Mundu Chilindo reigned very well and died in 1951.	?	
8. Chief Mwene Mundu Muyamba	His Palace was at Liumba in Bulozi	1952	1992	In 1952 Chief Mwene Mundu Muyamba succeeded Chief Mwene Mundu Chilindo. At the time Chief Mundu Muyamba succeeded, he was already a nobleman (Induna) representing the Mbunda by sitting on the Lozi court for settling disputes in the Libonda court during King Imwiko's reign (1946-48). However, his installation as Chief Mundu remain controversial as to being the rightful successor. It is believed it was not Chief Mundu Chilindo's relative but a step son who came with the mother in marriage. His choice was more influenced by the Lozi Chieftainship, since he was the one who was always seen accompanying Chief Mwene Mundu Chilindo at the Lozi Libonda palace. This also influenced his choice as a nobleman representing the Mbunda by sitting on the Lozi court for settling disputes in the Libonda court during the reign of King Imwiko. To date all the Mbunda Chiefs who reign with the title Chief Mundu are permanently settled in Liumba. Kalabo District in the Western Province of Zambia.	?	
9. Chief Mwene Mundu Likithi Kaunda	His Palace was at Liumba in Kalabo District of Western Province of Zambia.	1992	2008	After Chief Mwene Mundu Muyamba's death, in 1992, Chief Mundu Likithi Kaunda succeeded him and reigned until August 2008 when he died. Coincidentally, he died in the same month and year when the Mbunda Monarch of King Mbandu III Mbandu Lifuti was being installed. He very much wanted to accompany the Zambian entourage going to install the Mbunda people	?	

== Chief Mwene Kandala Dynasty ==
The second Mbunda Chiefs to settle in Bulozi were also of the Mbunda Mbalango dialect (Vambalango). During the reign of Chief Mundu Kalomo ka Chompe, Chief Kandala Vyemba, nephew to Chief Mundu Man'ulumbe fled into Bulozi. Chief Kandala had come into Bulozi to seek asylum for he was being sought for by King Ngonga I Chiteta of the Mbunda ya Mathzi after a domestic dispute between them which had erupted from a theft case that involved the two Royalties in which Chief Kandala's people had stolen an antelope from King Ngonga I Chiteta's hunting trap. Sometimes the succession followed Lozi custom as the Vambalango lived among the Lozi and tended to adopt Lozi customs.

Name	Lifespan	Reign start	Reign end	Notes	Family	Image
1. Chief Mwene Kandala Viemba	His Palace was at Kanyonyo, Mongu in Bulozi	1795	1800s	Chief Mwene Kandala Vyemba was the second Mbunda-Mbalango Mwene (Chief) to come into Bulozi. He was the nephew of Chief Mundu Man’ulumbe, the first Mbunda Chief to settle in Bulozi. His mother was Chieftainess Mbambi. After his mother's death, he was made Chief in her stead and reigned in his palace at Kalumana on the bank of Lwati river. Chief Mwene Kandala Vyemba left his country for Bulozi because of differences he had firstly with his brother Chungamalala Kasavi and secondly with King Ngonga I Chiteta. In both cases theft was involved by Chief Kandala's subordinates who had, in the Fulumana river area of Mbundaland now Angola, stolen an antelope belonging to King Ngonga I Chiteta. After these disputes and warnings Chief Mwene Kandala decided to leave Mbundaland leaving his brother Chungamalala Kasavi there as he departed for Bulozi. When they reached Tushole his wife delivered a baby girl and nicknamed the baby "Kashembe", Meaning: "We shall be mocked at that we deliver whilst on the way." After that they came to Lilengo and then proceeded to Kalamba. He was welcomed by the Aluyi King Mulambwa. They were allowed to settle at Kanyonyo. Before they finally settled at Kanyonyo, Chief Mwene Kandala Vyemba was granted the status of Proselyte in the Lozi chieftainship and was recognized as a son of the King Mulambwa who gave him a herd of cattle for this recognition. Chief Kandala lived many years during the rule of King Mulambwa and died at his palace in Yuka and was buried near the modern site of Mongu's Lewanika hospital.	?	
2. Chief Mwene Kalanda Kumba	His Palace was at Kanyonyo, Mongu in Bulozi	?	?	After his death of Chief Mwene Kandala Vyemba, a great controversy arose among the Mbunda during their consideration of a successor. Some proposed that his son Kasina should rule but this was not according to Mbunda tradition which required that a matrilineal nephew be picked for the Chieftainship. This contrast grew so sharp that they referred the matter to the King Mulambwa for a solution but he only advised them to observe their traditional customs. They enthrned Kalanda Kumba as Chief but they did not give him the title of Chief Mwene Kandala which they gave to Chief Ngulungu Mushondo. Kalanda Kumba only ruled for a very short period and was removed by his brothers for he was so insolent.	?	
3. Chief Mwene Kandala Kasina	His Palace was at Yuka in Mavumbu, Mongu in Bulozi	?	?	Chief Mwene Kasina Kandala, succeeded his father's stead and settled at Yuka in Mavumbu. He was made a Chief at Kabompo at the tributary of the Kabompo river called Samatutu where they fled the Makololo/Aluyi war. Prince Ngulungu Mushondo settled in Nalinanga whereas most of the Mbunda people settled at Lukwakwa all through the period of the Makololo-Aluyi war. They returned after the war during the reign of the Aluyi King Chipopa Lutangu Nosiku (Sipopa Lutangu). When Chief Kandala Kasina returned from Lukwakwa after the war, he shifted from Kanyonyo to settle at Yuka in Mavumbu, at Kusina wa Livimba. To date Chief Mwene Kandala's palace is still at Yuka in Mavumbu, Mongu district in the Western Province of Zambia. His capital is called Yuka.	?	
4. Chief Mwene Kandala Mandandi	His Palace was at Yuka in Mavumbu, Mongu in Bulozi	?	?		?	
5. Chief Mwene Kandala Livimba	His Palace was at Yuka in Mavumbu, Mongu in Bulozi	?	?		?	
6. Chief Mwene Kandala Kasina II	His Palace was at Yuka in Mavumbu, Mongu in Bulozi	?	?		?	
7. Chief Mwene Kandala Vyemba II	His Palace was at Yuka in Mavumbu, Mongu in Bulozi	?	?		?	
8. Chief Mwene Kandala Mubonda Liwena	His Palace was at Yuka in Mavumbu, Mongu District of Western Province of Zambia.	?	?		?	
9. Chief Mwene Kandala Sakwiba Libimba	His Palace is at Yuka in Mavumbu, Mongu District of Western Province of Zambia.	?	?	The current by 2014 on the throne	?	

== Chief Mwene Chiyengele Dynasty ==
The third Mbunda Chiefs to settle in Bulozi were from the central Mbunda Mathzi Chieftainship, which left Mbundaland in frustration due to violation of the Mbunda custom of a son ascendance to the throne rather than a nephew.

Name	Lifespan	Reign start	Reign end	Notes	Family	Image
1. Chief Mwene Chitengi Chingumbe Chiyengele	His Palace was at Nan'oko, in Mongu in Bulozi	1795	1800s	Chief Mwene Chitengi Chiyengele was a son of King Chingumbe with his Queen, Chieftainess Kakuhu of Musholo. He succeeded his father King Chingumbe as the 15th Mbunda monarch upon the deceased's decree, but because of the earlier decree of nephew successors only, the Mbunda scheemed to remove him. In frustration he migrated to Barotseland in the now Zambia in 1795. King Mulambwa offered Chief mwene Chitengi Chingumbe Chiyengele the area known as Namaya in the plains east of Namuyowa for him to settle with the people. But he declined that offer because the Mbunda were not used to staying in the plain, but preferred forests where they cultivate their staple food such as cassava, millet family crops, beans, groundnuts and bush potatoes. Thereafter he was offered another area called Nan'oko, in Mongu where Chief Mwene Chitengi Chingumbe Chiyengele built his Palace, and settled with a group of his Mbunda followers. The Aluyi and their leader, the Litunga Mulambwa especially prized the Mbunda for their ability to fight. When the Luvale also known as Lovale invaded Barotseland from the north, the Mbunda countered the invasion and were victorious, ending the Lovale invasions. King Mulambwa also cemented the bond of friendship between the Aluyi and the Mbunda with a ten (10) point Mulambwa/ Chiyengele Treaty and ceremonially giving a sharp pointed pole called mulombwe to Mwene Chitengi Chiyengele and confirmed his stay in Barotseland as the Senior Chief of the Mbunda. This and other factors earned the Mbunda to be included on the Barotse National Council. These were later called the Chiyengele group or Mbunda Xamuka.	best known son; Prince Munamwene Ngulungu (first born son of Chief Mwene Chitengi Chiyengele)	
2. Chief Mwene Chiyengele Mbinja	His Palace was at Nan'oko, in Mongu in Bulozi	?	?		?	
3. Chief Mwene Chiyengele Mulwalwa	His Palace was at Nan'oko, in Mongu in Bulozi	?	?		?	
4. Chief Mwene Chiyengele Litala	His Palace was at Nan'oko, in Mongu in Bulozi	?	?		?	
5. Chief Mwene Chiyengele Nyumbu	His Palace was at Nan'oko, in Mongu in Bulozi	?	?	He later left the throne	?	
6. Chief Mwene Chiyengele Likithi	His Palace was at Nan'oko, in Mongu in Bulozi	?	?		?	
7. Chief Mwene Chiyengele Nyumbu	His Palace was at Nan'oko, in Mongu in Bulozi	?	?	He later succeeded the throne again after leaving it	?	
8. Chief Mwene Chiyengele Chitengi	His Palace was at Nan'oko, in Mongu in Bulozi	?	?		?	
9. Chief Mwene Chiyengele Chingumbe Likithi	His Palace was at Nan'oko, in Mongu in Bulozi	?	?		?	
10. Chief Mwene Chiyengele Chingumbe Nyumbu	His Palace was at Nan'oko, in Mongu in Western Province of Zambia	?	?	He was the grandson of Chief Mwene Chitengi Chiyengele the first and son of King Chingumbe, King Yambayamba Kapanda's brother, one who was received by the Aluyi King Mulambwa Santulu in Barotseland, upon his migration from Mbundaland,	?	
11. Chief Mwene Chiyengele Josiah Nyumbu	His Palace was at Nan'oko, in Mongu in Western Province of Zambia	21 August 2007	15 October 2014	Dethroned by the Barotse Royal Establishment (BRE) and his recognition withdrawn by the Zambian Government on 29 May 2015	?	

== Chief Mwene Chikufele Dynasty ==
After the death of King Mulambwa, the Makololo defeated and occupied Bulozi. Some Aluyi and Mbundas migrated from Bulozi to other places. The Mbunda who had supported Prince Mubukwanu, one of Mulambwa's sons left for the now Kabompo. Most of them went to Nakalomo in present-day Lukulu. Here they abandoned their stockade due to Makololo attacks. When Nxaba (Ngabe) in his pursuance to invade the Makololo came to Kakenge's area, (ruler of the Luvale) in the north, he failed to break through the Mbunda fortress at Nakalomo. He then negotiated and tried to persuade the Mbunda to join him and his group, in an alliance against the Kololo. The Mbunda however remained suspicious and merely supplied the Mandebele with guides who took them across the Zambezi westwards in the direction of the Kololo who at that time were pursuing the Luyana fleeing to Nyengo. Those Mandebele were all killed in the valley which was named after them as "Matebele Valley". Those Mbunda who in 1830 had, due to Makololo invasion, abandoned Nakalomo went to settle east of Manyinga river finding there only a few Nkoya villages. Prior to 1920, the now Kabompo District was uninhabited. Amongst those that migrated to Manyinga, were Prince Namiluko the son of Mulambwa with his son Chikufele. They took the Nkoya under control and established the headquarters of their leader Chikufele (Sikufele) at what came to be known as Lukwakwa. Prince Namiluko and his son Prince Chikufele established the Mbunda Chieftainship at Kabompo, after the expulsion of the Kalolo inversion. After that, many of the Mbundas returned to Barotseland but the Chikufele family remained at Lukwakwa. In those years the Chokwes, the Luvales and the Luchazis had not yet migrated to Kabompo. Though there were some Lozi rulers who were allowed to the Lukwakwa throne, it basically remained under the control of the Mbunda. Sikufele became the main chief of all the Manyinga Native Authorities and the Administrative Court remained under the Mbunda after it was restored from the Lunda. While power was being firmly wrestled by the Mbunda in Manyinga area their influence at the Central Throne of the Lozi Kingdom was still felt. After Lubosi Lewanika fled the throne at the insurrection by Mataa and Numwa in 1884, Tatila Akufuna, one who knew not a single word in Luyana nor in Chikololo (Sikololouthe new Lozi), but spoke Mbunda, was called upon to take up the central throne. Tatila Akufuna (son of Imbue) was a direct product of the Mbunda at Lukwakwa.

Name	Lifespan	Reign start	Reign end	Notes	Family	Image
1. Chief Chikufele	His Palace was at Lukwakwa in Manyinga.	1830	1916	Chief Mwene Chikufele became the first Chief at Lukwakwa in Manyinga. He died in 1916 from lightning		
2. Chief Mwene Chikufele Namiluko	His Palace was at Lukwakwa in Manyinga	1916	1928	Chikufele Namiluko succeeded Chief Mwene Chikufele but his reign was short lived when he was exiled into Angola where he died in 1928.	?	
3. Chief Mwene Chikufele Njamba Ilukuyi	His Palace was at Lukwakwa in Manyinga	?	?	After Sikufele Namiluko had been exiled, a Lozi appointee by the name of Njamba Ilukuyi succeeded him but he reigned for a short period and he died. Njamba Ilukuyi was a cousin of the King Yeta III of the Lozi. The name of Sikufele became the official title to the throne of the Lukwakwa established Mbunda chieftainship around the Manyinga area.	?	
4. Chief Mwene Sikufele Imasiku	His Palace was at Lukwakwa in Manyinga	?	?	After the reign of Chief Mwene Njamba Ilukuyi, Chief Mwene Imasiku was enthroned but the Mbunda soon got tired of his reign and sent for Imbua from Nyengo to come and rule over them but they rejected him as soon as he arrived and instead restored the throne back to Chief Mwene Imasiku. Imasiku also did not reign for long. He was assassinated by his relatives.	?	
5. Chief Mwene Chikufele Muviwa		?	?	Chief Chikufele Muviwa succeeded Imasiku, but he was shortly dethroned by the Lozi King at Lealuyi. He was recalled to Bulozi	?	
6. Nobleman Induna Imasiku	At Lukwakwa in Manyinga	?	?	Induna Imasiku was sent to preside over Chief Chikufele Muviwa local court on a caretaker basis. The time Induna Imasiku was presiding over Chief Chikufele's local court, he appointed Kalunga Samusandi to be a junior Induna in Chief Chikufele's local court. Shortly thereafter, Induna Imasiku appointed and enthroned Kalunga Samusandi as the first Chief of the Luchazi tribe in the Manyinga area.	?	
7. Chief Mwene Chikufele Muviwa	His Palace was at Lukwakwa in Manyinga	1935	?	In 1932, Chief Mwene Chikufele Muviwa returned to Katuba, in Manyinga area but as an ordinary person, without royal powers. In 1935, the Lozi King at Lealuyi, in agreement with Mbundas at Lukwakwa, reinstalled Chief Chikufele Muviwa on his Throne. Later, groups of Luchazi started moving further East from Chief Shinde's area, where they settled earlier and were welcomed and given land in the Upper Mumbeji, by Chief Chikufele, under the Manyinga Native Authorities. This was followed by groups of Chokwes, Luvales and Lundas (not in any sequence). In 1941, before Kabompo Boma came into existence, the Government separated Zambezi from Barotseland. Chief Chikufele had two other Mbunda subordinated chiefs namely Chiengele, Vulamitata and two others: a Nkoya called Mutinginyi and a Luchazi called Kalunga. In 1944 recognition was withdrawn from Mutinginyi and Vulamitata. In 1945 Induna Imasiku was recalled to Barotseland. The Mbunda in Manyinga resolved never again to be presided by a Barotseland Indunas. Chief Shinde of Zambezi wanted to control Manyinga in order to include it to his Zambezi areas. However, Manyinga people and village headmen rejected th Chief Shinde's move, contending that; the Chikufele chieftainship is the earlier and most senior in Manyinga, and that the first local court in Manyinga was his at his palace. An election was therefore organized, comprising more than 300 village headmen and all chiefs in the area, and Chief Chikufele was elected the Senior Chief of Manyinga Native Authority. Manyinga Native Authority was at his palace. Senior Chief Chikufele then decreed that; he had broken away from Barotseland and that he would remain independent at Manyinga with the Mbunda chieftainship and that, it should be known that he was a Mbunda. Chief Mwene Chikufele remained a supreme power in the political administration of the whole Manyinga area and was seen as a symbol of the British administrative system. He was to be helped by the Council whose powers he could not overrule. There were administrative villages called ndandanda (or ndandanga) which consisted of membo (villages)	?	
8. Chief Mwene Sikufele Akatoka	His Palace was at Lukwakwa in Manyinga	1958	1959	By 1958, Chief Mwene Sikufele Akatoka became the Senior Chief of Kabompo District. However his reign was short-lived.		
9. Senior Chief Mwene Sikufele Lyamungongo	His Palace was at Lukwakwa in Manyinga	1959	?	Chief Mwene Sikufele Lyamungongo was installed as the next Mwene Sikufele in 1959.	?	
10. Senior Chief Mwene Sikufele Akatoka Thompson	His Palace is at Lukwakwa in Manyinga, Kabompo District, Northwestern Province of Zambia	?	The current by 2014 on the throne	After Sikufele Lyamungongo, came Sikufele Akatoka Thompson, the son of the previous Sikufele Akatoka whose recognition as chief had been withdrawn in 1959 by the colonial governor. Senior Chief Mwene Chikufele (Sikufele) Akatoka is the current senior chief of Kabompo District in the North-Western Province of Zambia.	?	

== Chief Mwene Kathimba Dynasty ==
This is a Mbunda Chieftainship related to Chief Chitengi Chingumbe Chiyengele, which was later recognised after the Kaonde/Lozi war, which the Lozis won with the help of the Mbunda war machinery, resulting in the Mbunda Chieftainship of Chief Mwene Kathimba having firmly been established at the confluence of the Lalafuta and Kyamenge in 1893, opposite Chief Mushima Njivumina of the Kaonde. The chieftainship of the Chief Mwene Kathimba brought peace to the area. It is said that when the first Mwene Kathimba arrived, Nkoya inhabitants of the area were forced to live in stockaded villages for fear of the Kaonde who were their enemies at that time. But today all three peoples co-exist with mutual respect in Kaoma District of the Western Province of Zambia.

Name	Lifespan	Reign start	Reign end	Notes	Family	Image
1. Chief Mwene Kathimba Kafunya	His Palace was near the confluence of the Lalafuta and Kyamenge in Bulozi	1893	1916	The first Mwene Kathimba was Kathimba Kafunya. He was related to Mwene Chitengi Chingumbe Chiyengele and like him, was a great hunter of elephants and buffaloes. Mwene Kathimba Kafunya left Nakalomo in Bulozi to hunt for game in the Kaonde areas of Chiefs Kasempa, Kasonso and Chief Mushima. Later, the Lozi Paramount Chief recognized him as chief and he was installed as chief at the confluence of the Lalafuta and Kyamenge in 1893, opposite Chief Mushima Njivumina of the Kaonde. After some time he moved to Nyango where he died in 1916.	?	
2. Chief Mwene Kathimba Lyuma Mukeya; Mbimbya ya Chipitha Mema	His Palace was near the confluence of the Lalafuta and Kyamenge in Bulozi	1916	1927	Chief Mwene Kathimba Lyuma Mukeya who was nicknamed "Mbimbya ya Chipitha Mema" took over as the second Chief Mwene Kathimba. He died in 1927.	?	
3. Chief Mwene Kathimba Kakao	His Palace was near the confluence of the Lalafuta and Kyamenge in Bulozi	?	?	Following the death of Mwene Kathimba Lyuma Mukeya, Mwene Kathimba Kakao was installed as the third Mwene Kathimba.	?	
4. Chief Mwene Kathimba Joshua Mboma	His Palace was near the confluence of the Lalafuta and Kyamenge in Bulozi	?	?	Later, Chief Mwene Kathimba Joshua Mboma shifted from Lalafuta to Kalumwange where he died.	?	
5. Chief Mwene Kathimba Maxwell Kafunya	His Palace was at Kalumwange, near the confluence of the Lalafuta and Kyamenge in Bulozi	?	?	Mwene Kathimba Maxwell Kafunya, a son of Mwene Kathimba Kakao took over the chieftainship in Kalumwange where he died as the fifth Mwene Kathimba.	?	
6. Chief Mwene Kathimba Johnson Mbindo	His Palace was at Kalumwange, near the confluence of the Lalafuta and Kyamenge in Kaoma District, Western Province of Zambia	1993	2007	In 1993 Chief Mwene Kathimba Johnson Mbindo, another son of Mwene Kathimba Kakao, was chosen to take over as chief. In the year 2007, Chief Mwene Kathimba Johnson Mbindo was dethroned by the Lozi Chieftainship at Naliyele Palace due to his difficult personality, lack of dignity and unroyal ethics.	?	
7. Chief Mwene Kathimba Chikambo	His Palace is at Kalumwange, near the confluence of the Lalafuta and Kyamenge in Kaoma District, Western Province of Zambia	2008	The current by 2014 on the throne	He is currently reigning on the throne. The chieftainship of Chief Mwene Kathimba has brought peace to the area. It is said that when the first Chief Kathimba arrived, the Nkoya inhabitants of the area were forced to live in stockaded villages for fear of the Kaonde who were their enemies at that time. But today all three peoples co-exist with mutual respect in Kaoma District of the Western Province of Zambia.	?	

== Chief Mwene Chiyengele Chingumbe Dynasty ==
This is a Mbunda Chieftainship from King Mwene Chingumbe Chingumbe Cha Choola and related to Chief Chiyengele Chitenge Chingumbe the 15th Mbunda monarch, who migrated to Kayombo in the now Kabompo District. The succession list is not complete; more data will be added in the future.

Name	Lifespan	Reign start	Reign end	Notes	Family	Image
3. Chief Mwene Chiyengele Chingumbe III	His Palace was at Kayombo, on the northern border of Zambia and Angola, in Kapombo District, North Western Province of Zambia	?	2011	He was one of the subordinated chiefs to Senior Chief Sikufele in Kabompo District, the other being Chief Kalunga of the Luchazi people at Kakenge palace in his area called Upper Mumbeji. He died in 2011 and he is yet to be succeeded.	?	

== Chief Mwene Kandombwe Dynasty ==
The Mwene Kandombwe chieftainship originates from the central Mbunda royal line (Mbunda-Mathzi). The first Mwene Kandombwe was the son of Chieftainess Vamwene Machalo, one of the three sisters of King Mwene Yambayamba and King Mwene Chingumbe with the Luvale prince-consort named Chivinda cha Nkoshi, in Angola.

Name	Lifespan	Reign start	Reign end	Notes	Family	Image
1. Chief Mwene Kandombwe Mumbwala	His Palace was at an area between Luvuji and Kahuli rivers in nakalomo, now Lukulu of Bulozi	1915	?	Before migrating to Bulozi now Zambia, Chief Mwene Kandombwe Mumbwala he used to visit the Aluyi King Ngombala. He migrated to Bulozi during the reign of Aluyi King Yeta, and was given land to settle with his people by the Aluyi King's Nobleman, Induna Imusunga Malamo.	?	
2. Chief Mwene Kandombwe Mbundu Kayawe	His Palace was at an area between Luvuji and Kahuli rivers in Lukulu of Bulozi	?	?		?	
3. Chief Mwene Kandombwe Chifwelu Kakoma	His Palace was at an area between Luvuji and Kahuli rivers in Lukulu of Bulozi	?	?		?	
4. Chief Mwene Kandombwe Kahuma Mulejima	His Palace was at an area between Luvuji and Kahuli rivers in Lukulu of Bulozi	?	?		?	
5. Chief Mwene Kandombwe Ka Machalo	His Palace is at an area between Luvuji and Kahuli rivers in Lukulu District, Western Province of Zambia	?	The current by 2014 on the throne	His local court on which he sits is at Luvuji in Lukulu District, Western Province of Zambia.	?	

== Chief Mwene Kasavi Dynasty ==
The Mwene Kasavi chieftainship originates from the central Mbunda royal line (Mbunda-Mathzi). The first Chief Mwene Kasavi was the son of King Mwene Nyumbu Luputa (one of the nephews of King Mwene Yambayamba and King Mwene Chingumbe) whose mother Queen Valishano Chikanda was from the Mbunda - Mbalango branch of the Mbunda chieftainship.

Name	Lifespan	Reign start	Reign end	Notes	Family	Image
1. Chief Mwene Kasavi ka Chikanda	His Palace was at Lukute, then Mankoya of Bulozi	1918	?	Mwene Kasavi ka Chikanda had his palace at Mbakala in Mushuma, Angola. Later he migrated to Bulozi with his people in 1918.	?	
2. Chief Mwene Kasavi Kayawe	His Palace was at Lukute, then Mankoya of Bulozi	?	?		?	
3. Chief Mwene Kasavi Kakoma	His Palace was at Lukute, then Mankoya of Bulozi	?	?		?	
4. Chief Mwene Kasavi Kambili	His Palace was at Lukute, then Mankoya, now Kaoma District of Western Province in Zambia	?	?		?	
5. Chief Mwene Kasavi Kapitango	His Palace was at Lukute, then Mankoya, now Kaoma District of Western Province in Zambia	?	?		?	
6. Chief Mwene Kasavi Makayi	His Palace was at Lukute, then Mankoya, now Kaoma District of Western Province in Zambia	?	?		?	
7. Chief Mwene Kasavi Kamuwanga	His Palace was at Lukute, then Mankoya, now Kaoma District of Western Province in Zambia	?	?		?	
8. Chief Mwene Kasavi Kajila	His Palace is at Lukute, then Mankoya, now Kaoma District of Western Province in Zambia	?	The current by 2014 on the throne	Controversy rages that the current Chief Mwene Kasavi Kajila hijacked the chieftainship. He does not hail from the Mbunda chieftainship but that, he is a Luvale	?	

== Chief Mwene Lindeho Dynasty ==
The Mwene Lindeho chieftainship originates from Vamwene Singisingi or Thingithingi, a daughter of Vamwene Ngambo Lyambayi. The first Mwene Lindeho Kanyanyu came to Kalabo District from Nengu in the district of Lumbala Ngimbu in Angola.

Name	Lifespan	Reign start	Reign end	Notes	Family	Image
1. Chief Lindeho Kanyanyu	His Palace was at Chamemba in Kalabo of Bulozi	?	?	King Lubosi Lewanika received him well and gave him to rule the area of Chamemba, Keta, Kashiyana, Tunjamba, Sanja and Kate. A local court was established in his palace headquarters with the required royal privileges intact: mukupele drum, eland tail flyswitch, xylophones, court messengers, attendants and councillors.	?	
2. Chief Mwene Lindeho Ngunga	His Palace was at Chamemba in Kalabo of Bulozi	?	?	He inherited the royal privileges and court of his predecessor.	?	
3. Chief Mwene Lindeho Katolo Chiputa	His Palace was at Chamemba in Kalabo Kalabo District, Western Province of Zambia	?	1991	During the time of Mwene Lindeho Katolo Chiputa the royal privileges and court were withdrawn by the Litunga in Lealui. This was done due to his difficult personality, lack of self dignity and unroyal ethics. He died in 1991 at Chamemba in Kalabo District in the Western Province of Zambia.	?	
4. Chief Mwene Lindeho Ndilayi Kalipa	His Palace is at Chamemba in Kalabo Kalabo District, Western Province of Zambia	?	The current by 2014 on the throne		?	

== See also ==
- Mbunda Kingdom
- Mbunda language
- Mbunda people
- List of The Rulers of the Mbunda Kingdom
