= Nkangala =

Nkangala may refer to:

- Nkangala District Municipality
- Nkangala dialect of Mbunda
