= Mbunda people =

Southern African people

Coordinates: 14°06′44″S 21°26′07″E

Mbunda Mbúùnda
- Person: Kambunda
- People: Vambunda
- Language: Chimbúùnda
- Country: Angola, Zambia

The Mbunda or Vambunda (singular Kambunda, adjective and language Mbunda, Mbúùnda or Chimbúùnda) are a Bantu people who, during the Bantu migrations, came from the north to south-eastern Angola and finally Barotseland, now part of Zambia. Their core is at present found in the south-east of Angola from the Lunguevungu river in Moxico to the Cuando Province.

The Mbunda comprise a number of subgroups, each of which speaks its own dialect: Mbunda Mathzi (Katavola), Yauma, Nkangala, Mbalango, Sango, Shamuka (Chiyengele) and Ndundu, all of them alive in southeast Angola. The Mbunda are often included as part of the Ganguela, a term used to describe a heterogeneous group of loosely affiliated peoples west of the Bié Plateau.

== Origins ==
According to the oral tradition of the Vambunda, the first monarch of the Mbunda Kingdom was King Mwene Nkuungu. It was along the tributaries to the Zambezi that the first Mbunda settled in present-day eastern Angola.

After the crossing of the Lyambayi or Zambezi river, as it is known today, the Mbunda under the leadership of Vamwene Kaamba ka Mbaao travelled up to a tributary of the Luena river in the now Angola which they named Mithimoyi. They settled along the Mithimoyi river (or Misimoyi as known by later settlers), now called Sakasaji river, named after a nearby Chokwe village. They settled near its confluence with the Luena river. Their first expansion movement was along Luchathzi river further south of Luena river after Mithimoyi.

This expansion, which was later spearheaded by the 12th and 13th Mbunda monarchs, King Mwene Kathangila ka Mukenge and King Yambayamba Kapanda expeditions respectively, also gave way to thirteen Mbunda descendant ethnicity of the Mbunda Mathzi (Katavola], the Chimbandi, the Humbi, the Ngonjelo, the Luimbi, the Nyemba, the Luchazi, the Sango, the Mbalango, the Nkangala, the Yauma, the Ndundu and the Mashaka.

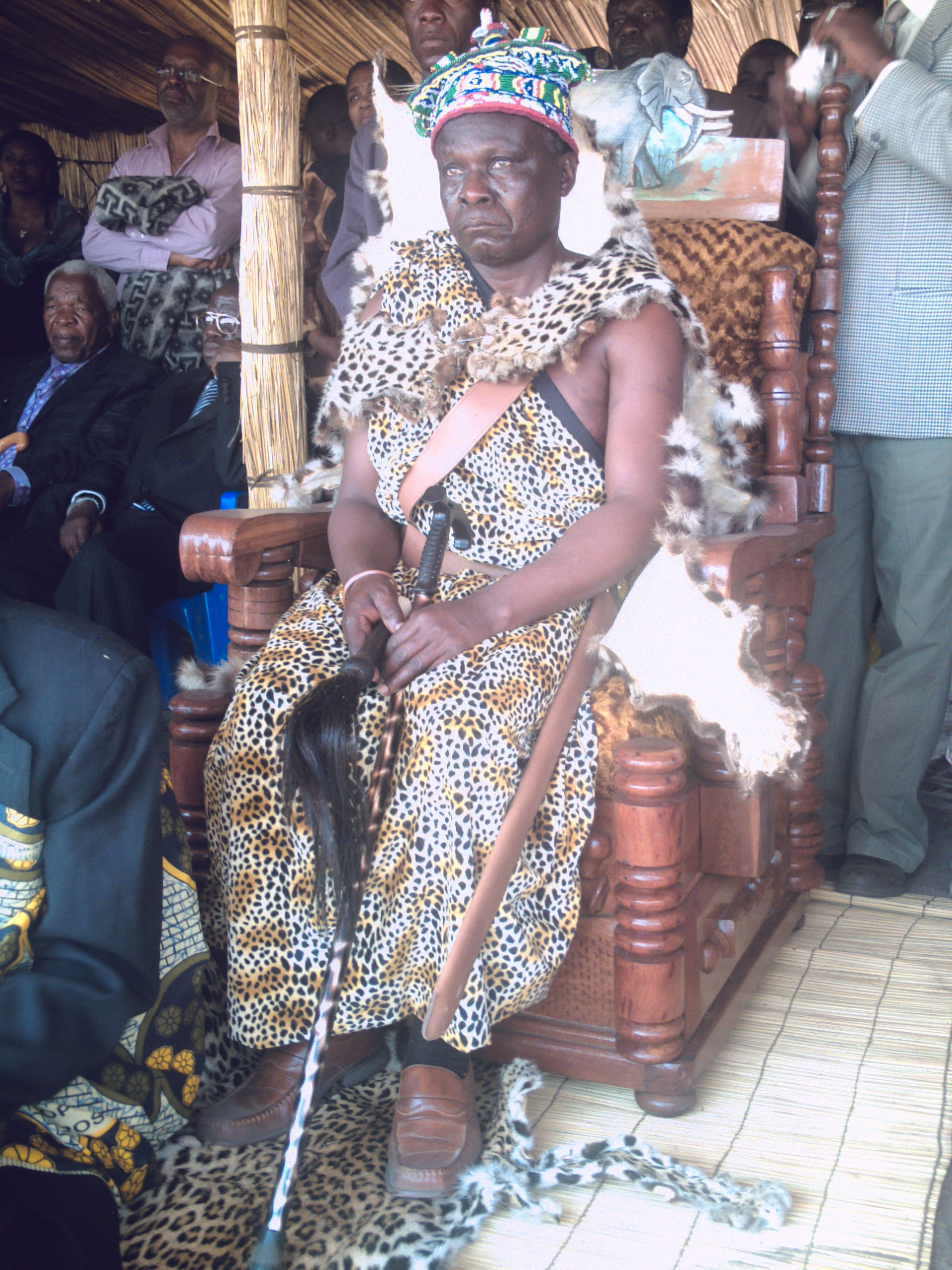
Mbunda 23rd Monarch His Majesty, King Mbandu III Mbandu Lifuti at His coronation and restoration of The Mbunda Kingdom in 2008.

The Mbunda continued expanding southwards to a larger settlement, where the Mbunda Kingdom continued to flourish in what became known as Mbundaland from Lungwevungu river to Chibanda or southern border with Namibia, while Lumbala Nguimbo became their capital, where His Majesty King Mbandu III Mbandu Lifuti reigns today.

=== War with the Chokwe ===
Meanwhile, back in Mbundaland the Mbunda people were involved in a fierce battle with the Chokwe people. That came about after the death of the 19th Mbunda monarch King Mwene Katavola I Mwechela, who was believed to have been assassinated after an abolitionist cabal, clandestinely plotted against him due to his promulgating a royal decree which forbade intermarriages with other nationalities. His successor and 20th Mbunda monarch, King Mwene Katavola II Musangu, who was believed to be one of the plotters of his assassination contravened the royal decree of his predecessor by his passion for a Chokwe slave beauty named Nyakoma, who was owned by the Chokwe Chief called Mwa Mushilinjinji whom he allocated land to settle at the Luwe, a tributary of the Nengu river. The marriage proposal was turned down by Mushilinjinji because it was taboo for a royal personage to marry a slave, because the offspring of such a marriage could never qualify as royals. That resulted in his declaration of war against the Chokwe people and an attempt to chase them out of the Mbundaland. He was killed within a few days after the Mbunda-Chokwe battle, having been ambushed and killed. The war conclusively ended in favour of the Mbunda, with his successor and 21st Mbunda monarch, King Mwene Mbandu I Lyondthzi Kapova who waged a systematic war of vengeance against the Chokwe for his nephew's death.

=== War with the Luvale ===
King Mwene Mbandu I Lyondthzi Kapova also led the Mbunda in their armed confrontation with the Luvale who were anxious to break the military power and independence of the Mbunda state and wanted to capture slaves for sale. The two opposing military forces engaged each other in armed combat in the Lunjweva area where he shot and killed Masambo, the leader of the invading Luvale forces. With the elimination of Masambo, the invaders were put to rout and forced to beat a hasty and disorderly retreat back to their homeland.

=== Migration to Barotseland ===
At the end of the 18th century, some of the Mbunda migrated to Barotseland, Mongu. upon the migration of among others, the Ciyengele

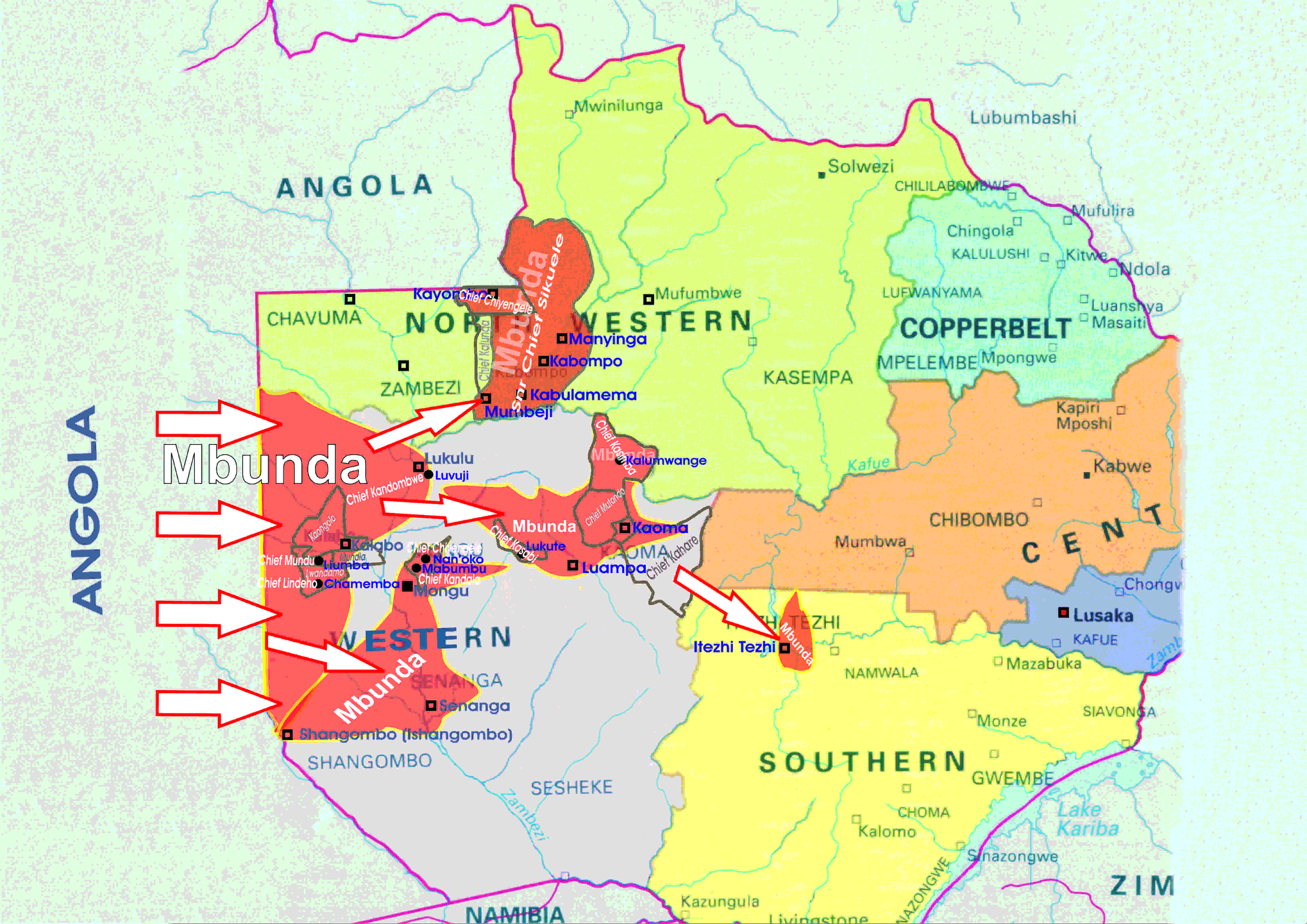
The Mbunda people migration areas from Angola to Zambia, starting in the latter part of the 18th century

The Aluyi and their leader, the Litunga Mulambwa especially prized the Mbunda for their ability to fight. When the Luvale also known as Lovale invaded Barotseland from the north, the Mbunda countered the invasion and were victorious, ending the Lovale invasions. King Mulambwa also cemented the bond of friendship between the Aluyi and the Mbunda with a ten (10) point Mulambwa/Chiyengele Treaty and ceremonially giving a sharp pointed pole called mulombwe to Mwene Chitengi Chiyengele and confirmed his stay in Barotseland as the Senior Chief of the Mbunda. This and other factors earned the Mbunda to be included on the Barotse National Council.

Secondly, the Mbunda fought alongside Aluyi in the Aluyi/Makololo war in 1830, which ousted the Makololo occupation of Barotseland, leading to the establishment of the Mbunda Chieftainship at Lukwakwa under Senior Chief Mwene Sikufele now in Kabompo District, being a descendant of the Mbunda that supported Prince Mubukwanu of the Aluyi. The Makololo from the south introduced the Sotho language spoken not only in Western Province today but also Botswana, Lesotho, South Africa and Caprivi Strip.

The Mbunda also fought alongside the Aluyi against the Tonga in the 1880s, emerging victory as the Tonga had no defense against the Mbunda's skill with a bow and arrow, resulting in the Lozi/Mbunda and Tonga Cousinship. Later the Kaonde/Lozi war which Lozis won with the help of the Mbunda war machinery, resulting in the Mbunda Chieftainship of Chief Mwene Kasimba having firmly been established there at the confluence of the Lalafuta and Kyamenge in 1893, opposite Chief Mushima Njivumina of the Kaonde. In honoring the Mulambwa/Chiyengele Treaty, the Mbunda have remained the true allies of the Aluyi both in military and political matters. The Mbunda lived peacefully, tendering their cattle and growing cassava, maize and rice, while many of the men left their homes to work in the South African mines. With Zambia independence from British rule that came in 1964, the practice was discouraged and the men were then recruited to work on the sugar plantations of Zambia.

=== Resistance to Portuguese occupation of Mbundaland ===
At the beginning of the 20th century due to their resistance to Portuguese colonial occupation, when the Portuguese colonialists abducted the twenty first (21st) Mbunda Monarch, King Mwene Mbandu I Lyondthzi Kapova, the Mbunda waged a fierce armed campaigns in defending their Mbundaland. Technology however, aided the Portuguese forces in gaining an upper hand in the war as they had a consistent supply of gunpowder for their guns. Without the knowledge to make gunpowder, the Mbunda eventually found their muzzle-loaders useless and increasingly relied on their bows and arrows as well as a few other traditional arms which were suited for close contact warfare. The Portuguese firepower took a heavy toll of the Mbunda, some of whom started to throw their muzzle-loaders in the rivers for lack of gunpowder. The Portuguese eventually dislodged the Mbunda Kingdom extending Angola territory over Mbundaland. This caused the second migration of the Mbunda to Barotseland.

And later because of the impact of the Angolan War of Independence (1961–1974) and the post-Independence Angolan Civil War (1975–2002), many of the Mbunda fled Angola to relocate in western Zambia, this marked the third and fourth wave of Mbunda immigration to the now Western Province of Zambia. These refugees were related to the Mbunda who were already living around Kalabo, Senanga, Mongu, Kaoma, Lukulu and Kabompo in Zambia. A number of Mbunda also took refuge in Northern Namibia, the west and east of Kavango Region, around Rundu and Nkurenkuru and Caprivi Strip.

== Royal Governance ==
The Mbunda system of traditional rule had been such that sovereign rule of the entire Kingdom was vested in the king who had to come from the central matrilineal line of the royal hierarchy. This somewhat limited the number of aspiring royals to the central throne. The King had absolute authority so that when he made a decision his or her decision was not questioned but was to be carried out. The two main functions of a King were to legislate rules and govern the community. At the same time there was an effective, decentralized system of traditional rule in the numerous areas and localities.

== Economic Activities ==
The Vambunda are talented iron (vutale) and copper (vunegu) workers and proficient hunters and soldiers with their bows and arrows. Both men and women are good at fishing. While men use nets and other implements, women use special kind of baskets to catch fish. They are also remarkably skilled at a number of economic activities, such as:

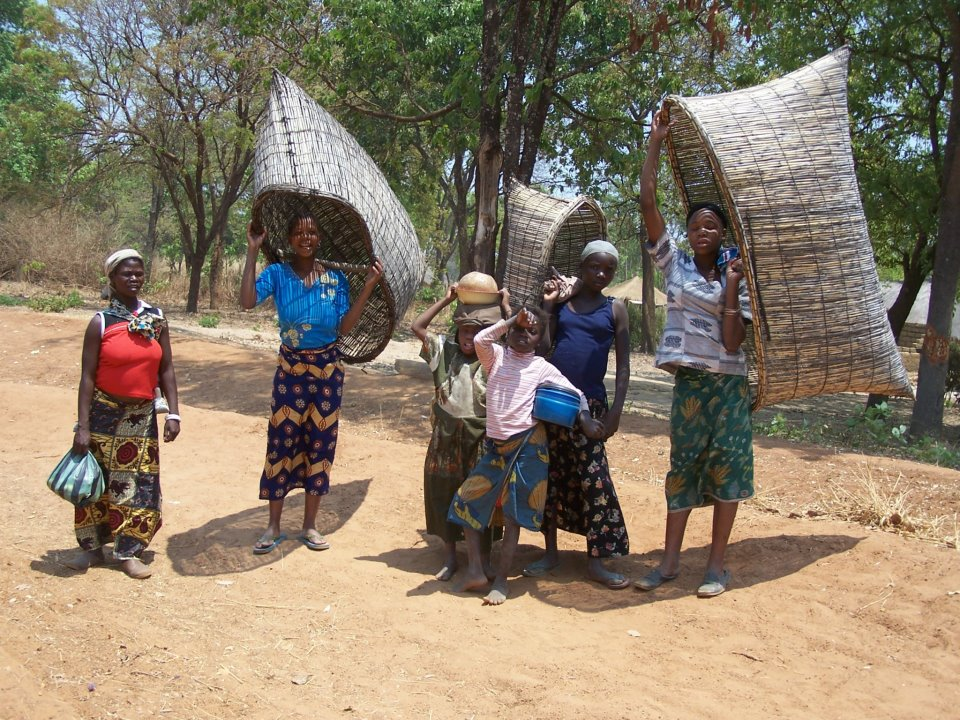
Mbunda women on a fishing expedition, carrying fishing baskets called "Matambi" over their shoulders

=== Art of making pots and jars of baked clay ===
They collect clay from the plain or the river banks, put it in a special container called liwati and wet it with water, after pounding it they then mix it with burnt clay powder called vunga vwa vitambi.

=== Wood-carvings ===
Men cut pieces of trees and carve them into pounding sticks, mortars, spear and fish-spear shafts, knife-handles, walking sticks, axe and hoe handles, poles, curios, canoes and oars and also musical instruments, vithandthzi, a type of harp, vinkuvu, drums, stools, bowls, pounding troughs and other utensils.

=== Weaving, bark-cloth making ===
Men peel off the bark of big trees such as mushovi and munyumbe and hammer them on a plank with mallets called vithano till they become soft. These bark cloths are called vifundo and when the work is completed, the vifundo or maina! can be worn around the waist and also used as blankets.

=== Basket-making ===
Women make winnowing baskets, small bowl baskets called vingalo for food and big bowl shaped baskets called mendeko for keeping mealie meal and other things out of the roots of mijalu trees and small roots called tujalu. Men make fishing baskets called matambi out of a species of reeds called manenga, mats out of mateve (papyrus) called manala, also manala or mats out of long grass called n'olokoko as well as mavoya and kambanga water grass.

=== Salt-making ===
Long ago the Mbunda people introduced their own salt called mukele. Mukele is made out of the following grasses: mulele, stalks of maize and millet, mateve (papyrus) and cassava stalks.

=== Plant and animal oil-making ===
This is mainly for women again with the help of men. Oil is made out of wild fruits that bears fat and some of them are edible.

Apart from all that, Mbunda people cultivate the tropical forest which are found in where they live, and grow assorted crops. They grow maize, millet, sorghum, beans, and sweet potatoes and cassava being their staple food. They also keep domestic stock. Their traders before the Portuguese occupation for all these activities came into contact with the Portuguese, and Ovimbundu traders of Bié Plateau of central Angola, who largely traded in bee wax, ivory trade and rubber, in exchange with guns and cloth material.

== Religion ==
The Mbunda have two religious traditions which coexist in Mbunda society: the traditional religious practices and the modern religious practices and beliefs which are a combination of traditional and Christian influences. Overwhelmingly the Vambunda follow Christianity, with roughly equal shares falling to the Catholic Church and to different Protestant denominations, mainly the Igreja Evangélica Congregacional de Angola (IECA), founded by American missionaries.

Missionary Rev. Albert Bailey, of the Africa Evangelical Fellowship (then called the South African General Mission) entered Angola in 1914 and opened a mission station on Luanginga River and, with the aid of the Mbunda speaking man from Rhodesia, engaged in compiling a vocabulary – one of the first steps in the acquisition of an unwritten language. The work of translating the Mbunda Bible was started in earnest.

Still in 1914, a revolt by the Mbunda people against the Portuguese Colonialists caused large numbers of the local people to flee across the border into Barotseland, now Zambia. In 1916, Mr. Bailey decided to find a more populated location and, with the Governor's permission, built a station at Muie. In 1918, J. Jakeman and Andrew McGill relieved Mr. Bailey and established a number of outposts among the Mbunda and Luchazi people. In the ensuing years, four more stations were established: Cunjamba, N'inda, Casuango and Catota all in the fallen Mbundaland.

The book of John, was translated by the Rev Albert W Bailey known as (Avele), it was printed at Kamundongo Mission of United Church of Canada, now IECA- Igreja Evangelica Congregacional em Angola, in 1919; The book of Matthew in Mbunda and Portuguese was translated by Abraham at Muie in 1925; The book of Mark was translated by Rev. John C Procter at Muie also in 1925 and another edition of Rev Bailey's translation was published in diglot at Muie in 1928; The book of Luke was by Mateo at Muie in 1927 and also Hymnal in Portuguese and Mbunda. The Committee of reviewers consisted of Rev. Albert W Bailey, Rev. John C Procter, A McGill, Dr P.V. Watson.

In 1937 Mr. and Mrs. Pearson initiated a Bible Training School at Muie, with the New Testament (published in 1935) as their only textbook. At Muie Leonard and Nellie Brain had charge of the church work and operation of the mission station.

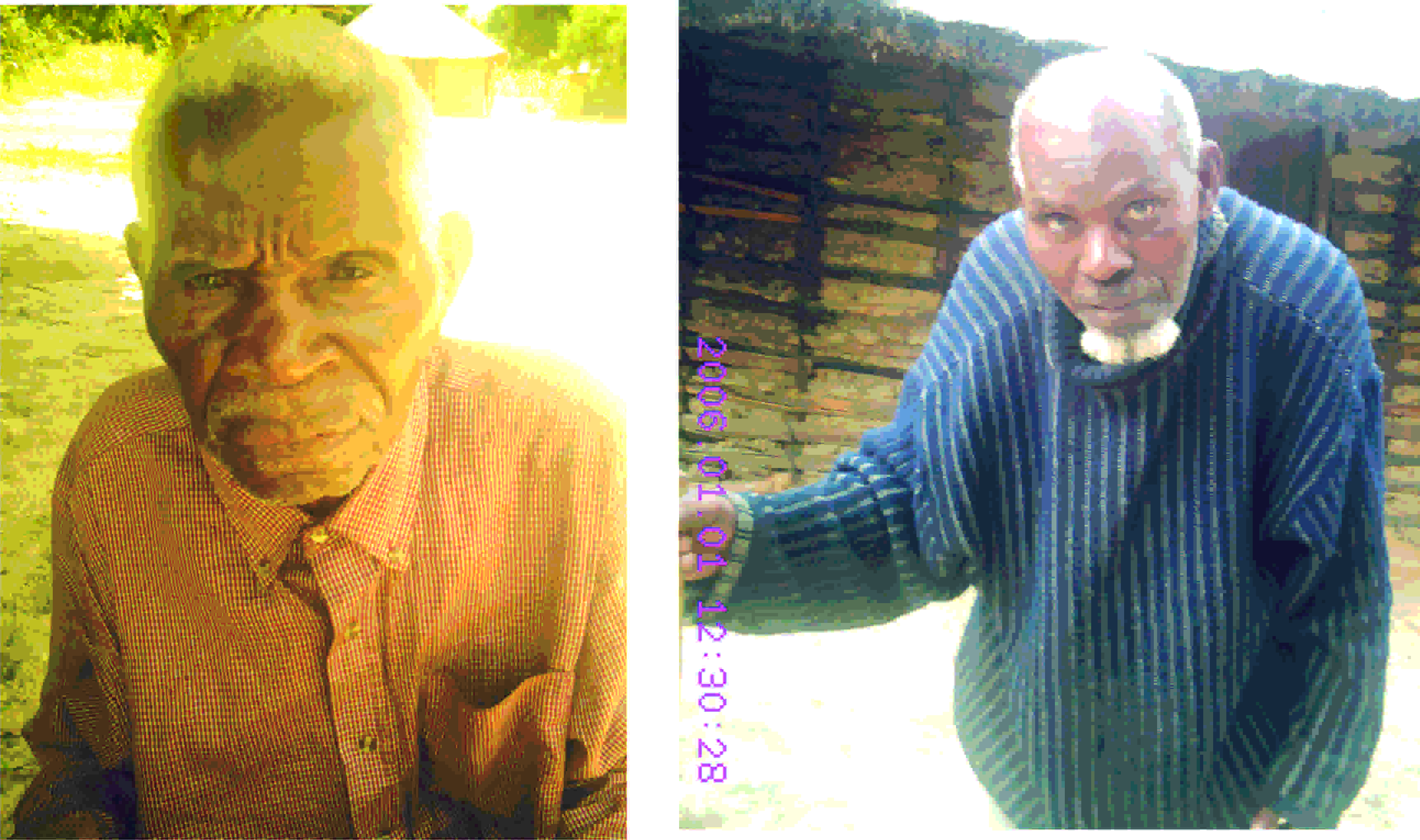
Two of the Members of the Mbunda Bible Translation Committee in Kaoma, Zambia: Elijah Kavita (97) left and Jeremiah Maliti Nkwanda (99) on 1 January 2006.

During a Mbunda workshop conducted by Dr. Hope in 1987 participants requested that the writing of certain words in Mbunda should be standardised and that the translators should be guided as to how to write certain Mbunda words.

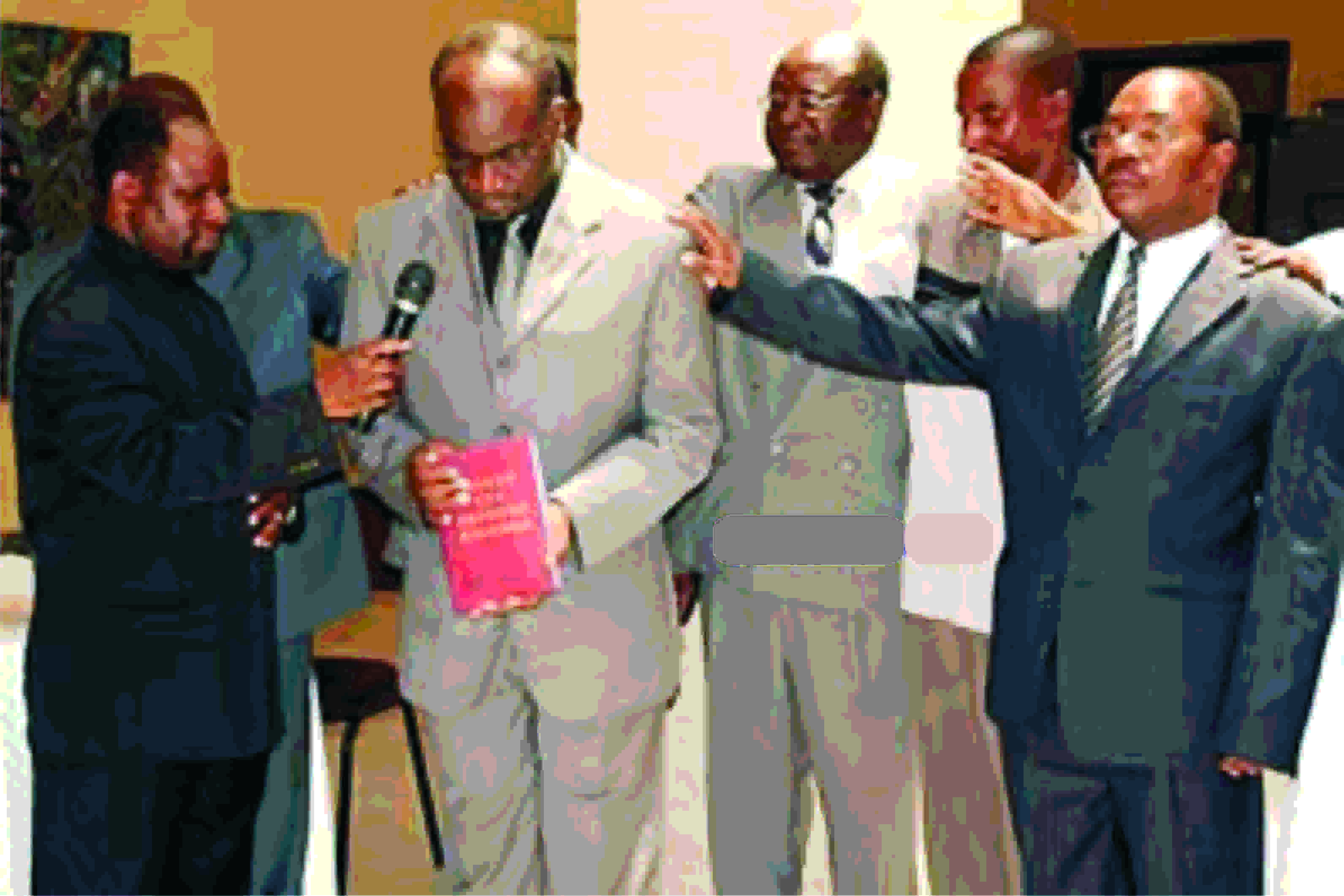
Launching of the Mbunda Bible in Lusaka, Zambia.

However, on 17 April 1989 it was resolved to drop the argument on the four major Luchazi spelling problems of "s", "z", "nz" and "ts" as opposed to the Mbunda "th", "thz", "ths" and "ndthz", and go ahead with the translation as there was always room for revision. The Mbunda Bible was finally printed and launched on 17 August 2008 in Angola and 31 January 2009 in Zambia. However the Mbunda Bible translation is still heavily saturated with Luchazi spellings.

Some Mbunda people though, still retain beliefs and practices from African traditional religions, believing in Njambi as a supreme creator of the world who created everything of existence on earth. Their religion did not address Njambi directly, but through the spirits of their ancestors.

== Traditions and rituals ==
The Mbunda have maintained most of their old traditions such as respect for their ancestors, “coming of age” rituals for both boys (Mukanda Initiation Ceremony and their not less than fifty Makithi artifacts), girls (Litungu or Bwali), relying on cattle, goats, wild meat, fish, chicken and cassava for their food, men carry weapons such as bow and arrows, spears or machetes when traveling away from their villages and women still creating baskets from makenge roots.

At the beginning of the planting season or when a hunter failed to kill animals, the people of a village gathered at fetish poles (vimbundi) marked or coloured with red and white

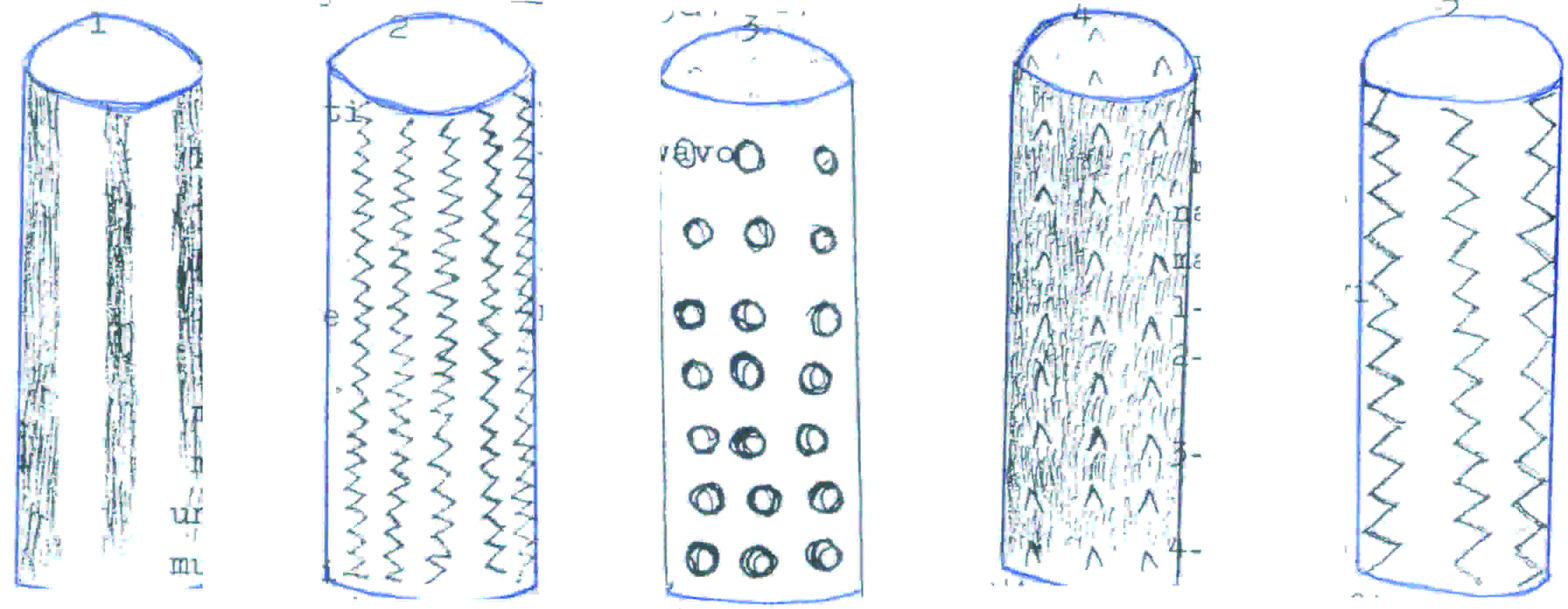
Mbunda fetish poles (Vimbundi) used in Traditional and Ritual worship

clay placed in the appropriate place, often outside the house just near the door directly against the bed where the heads point when people are asleep, to worship and pray to their ancestors, before the field activities start. This is also done when making offerings to their ancestors, during sicknesses or deaths where evil spirits were suspected, when bad dreams have been experienced and when summoning rains during a drought. Offerings are made in the form of a sacrifice such as killing an animal, a chicken, goat, cow, pig or sheep or any living thing with the exception of a human being. The blood of the animal was rubbed against the fetish poles (vimbundi) as respect, praise and honour to God and the spirits.

=== Origin of The Mbunda Mukanda Circumcision Ritual ===
Mukanda, is an initiation ritual for boys, which is practiced by the Mbunda. Usually, the young boys live for three to six months at a bush camp away from their villages after circumcission, to be taught practical survival-skills as well as knowledge about nature, religion, social practices and values. During that period a Makithi masquerade of not less

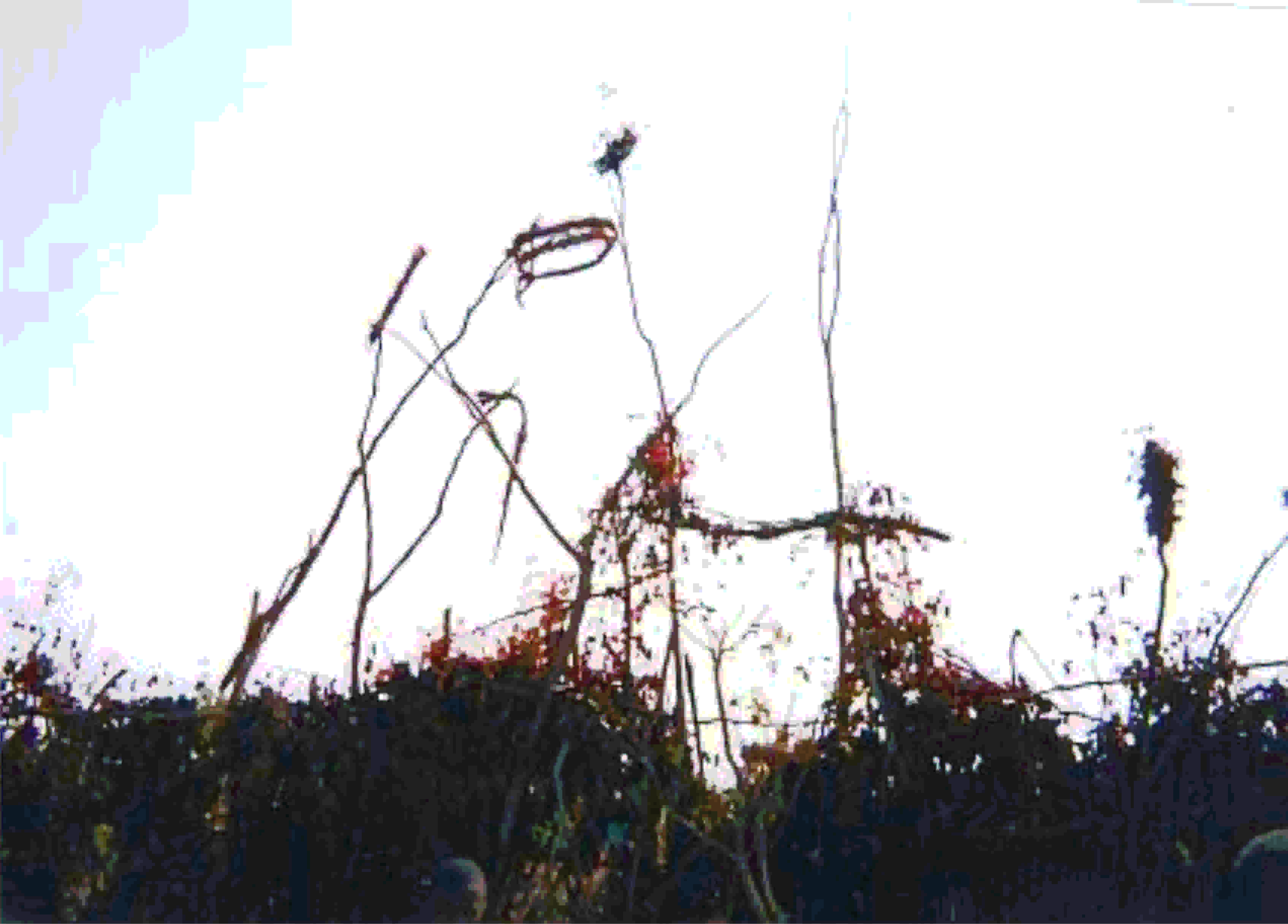
Mbunda Mukanda circumcision camp in the bush outside a village, away from females and the uncircumcised

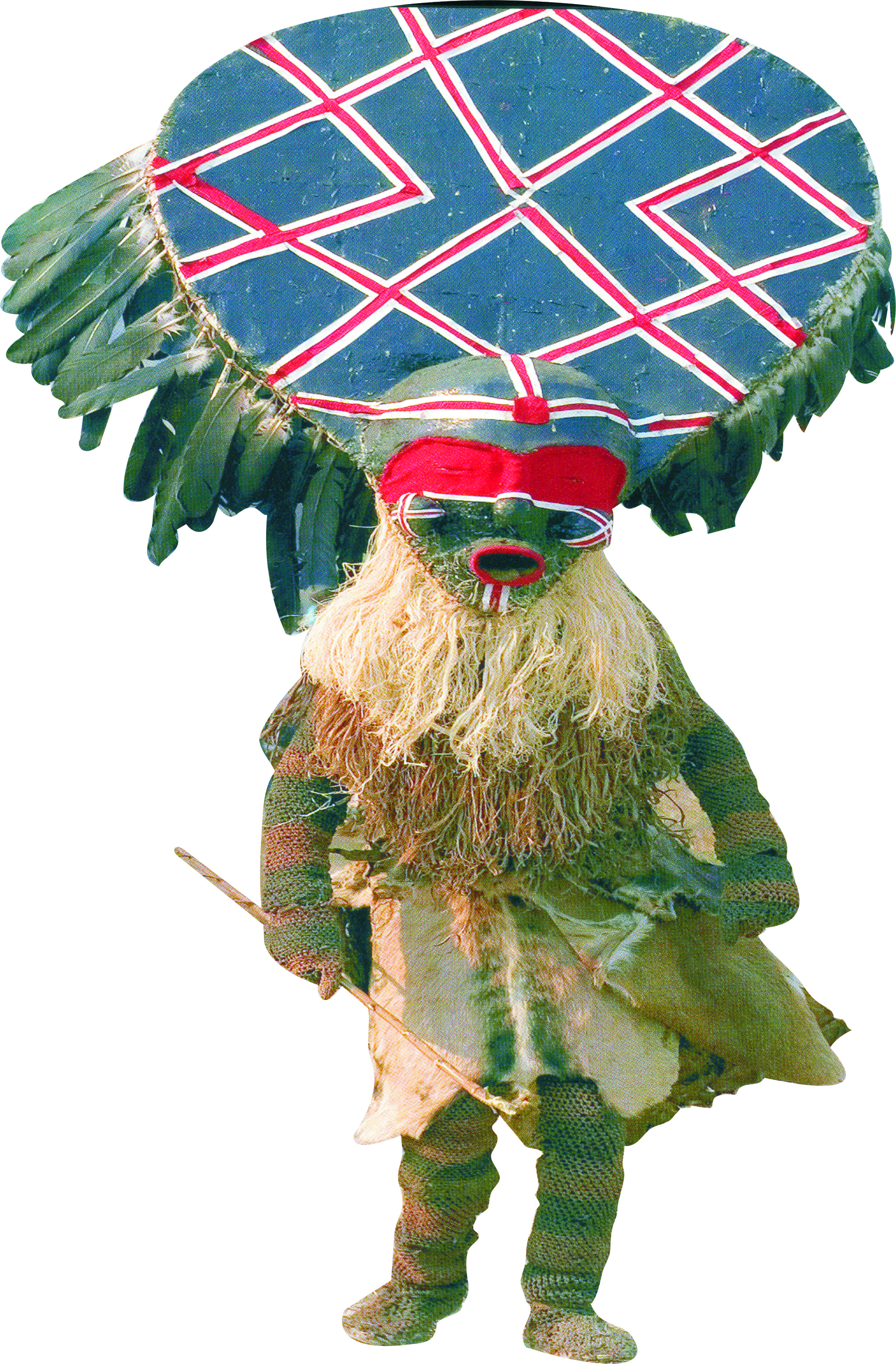
One of the not less than 50 Mbunda Makithi artifacts

than fifty (50) exclusive Mbunda artifacts is exhibited, and dances involving the pantomime-like artistry artifacts is performed as a cultural entertainment to the community. At the end of this initiation period, the boys are reintegrated into the community. This ritual is also practiced by other ethnicities like the Chokwe, the Luvale and the Luchazi, with the Mbunda being the major stakeholders in the Makishi masquerade as pronounced by others, owning not less than fifty (50) exclusive Mbunda artifacts.

It is believed that a Mbunda Prince Consort Mukwetunga Kamenga who was sent by the 10th Mbunda monarch King Mwene Katete ka Lweembe in pursuit of the elephants, strayed onto a Mukanda Circumcision camp for the Mbwela people, near the present day Angola and the Democratic Republic of the Congo border in Lubaland. This led to him getting circumcised and introduced the Mukanda circumcision ritual to the Mbunda upon his return. When Prince Consort Mukwetunga Kamenga returned with the Mukanda circumcision ritual, he found King Mwene Katete ka Lweembe who sent him had died and the Prince Consort's wife, Princesses Vamunamwene Mukenge had succeeded him. Queen Vamwene Mukenge, Livindamo was the last female Mbunda monarch. That was as a result of the circumcision ritual adoption meant for men only, which led to female rulership being subordinated to male political authority. This change meant that only male royalty could be enthroned as sovereign rulers or monarchs of the Mbunda Kingdom. Female royalty could henceforth never again assume the Mbunda monarch.

=== Mbunda Annual Ceremonies ===
The Mbunda have four annual ceremonies in which Mbunda people of Angola, Congo, Namibia and Zambia join to praise their Creator the Almighty God for the blessings on them in providing good harvest for the year. These ceremonies are: One in Angola called Lithathe Lya Miondo Ya Mbunda, celebrated every second week of August with the weekend being the climax, in Lumbala Nguimbo, Moxico at the palace of His Majesty King Mbandu III Mbandu Lifuti. Three in Zambia, with the first called Mbunda Mbalango Lyenya, celebrated every August at Chief Muundu palace in Liumba, Kalabo District of Western Zambia. The second called Mbunda Liyoyelo, celebrated every September at Chief Chiyengele Chingumbe II palace at Kayombo in Kabompo District of North Western Province of Zambia. The third called Mbunda Lukwakwa, celebrated during the first week of October with the weekend being the climax at Senior Chief Sikufele's palace at Manyinga in Kabompo District. All these ceremonies showcase the Mbunda makishi masquerade, wood carvings, a variety of Mbunda traditional foods and dances.

== Monthly and Seasonal Activities ==
=== Names of Months ===
English	Mbunda	Monthly Activities
January	Kavalana	In a traditional proverb it is said of January that: "Ngonde ku ivambala mawa. Ya vambala na vilya vya maxamgu". Which means: This month is not important on its own but owes its importance to the harvesting of millet.
February	Kutatu	It is the month that the new crop of millet is tasted. There is not adequate relish yet food is plentiful. There are heavy rains.
March	Kuwana	Time to meet in field huts to drink millet brewed beer and rejoice because they have reached the time of new crops according to the Mbunda, it was their new year.
April	Kuhu	Time for harvests from fields to be taken home and put it in granaries.
May	Kathikana	The cold season is just beginning and it is time initiation ceremonies are prepared and begun
June	Kavavu	Time trees and grass have withered by the cold.
July	Kondamema	The coldness is believed to break rocks and water left outside on dishes freezes.
August	Kaxukwe	Trees begin to lose their leaves. Clearing and preparation of fields for cultivation, sowing and planting start.
September	Kapepo	Sorghum is thrashed. Signs of rain manifest themselves by the appearance of dark clouds and thunder. Forests are burned.
October	Lipepo	Small lakes dry up. Side paths are created to avoid the hotness of the main paths. This month is sometimes called Kwenya, meaning burning.
November	Kandthzimbi	Trees are green all over and flowers appear on plants. Preliminary rains have begun to shower and in scattered places heavy rains fall. These rains are called nyondthzi ya cikaluvula, meaning early rains.
December	Ndthzimbi	There are heavy rains. Many fruits decay; mushrooms are growing while others are rotting. Birds are not healthy. Starvation looms, because food reserves have run out. Many go to work for others to get food. This month is often referred to as Ndungu, which means hunger.

=== Seasons of The Year ===
English	Mbunda	Seasonal Activities
Summer	Ntondwe	These are the months of Kashukwe (August), Kapepo (September) and Lipepo (October). It is in this season that fields are cleared and millet is sowed and cassava plants are planted. Many fruits ripen in the forests. it is also hot and people begin to make side paths to avoid the heat of the main paths.
Spring or Autumn	Ndombo	This is five months including Kandthzimbi (November). Ndthzimbi (December), Kavalana (January), Kutatu (February) and Kuwana (March). During this time other fruits such as manjongolo, vithala, vixole ripen while those. which ripened in summer rot away. Mushrooms grow and become important sources of relish. People who didn't raise enough crops and have depleted stores collect these for food until the next harvest.
Winter	Chithika	There are four months in this season. Kuuhu (April), Kathikana (May), Kavavu (June), and Kondamema (July). In this season harvesting and grain storage are important. It is very cold and water freezes and leaves are frozen and fall off of the deciduous trees.

== See also ==
- Mbunda language
- Mbunda Kingdom
- Rulers of Mbundaland
- List of Mbunda Chiefs in Zambia
