= Rulers of Mbundaland =

Coordinates: 14°06′44″S 21°26′07″E

The following is a complete list of rulers of the Mbunda Kingdom, established in the southeast of present-day Angola, covering the Moxico, Cuando, and Cubango Provinces.

== Early monarchs ==
Name	Descendants
King Nkuungu	Princess Naama
Queen Naama	Prince Nkonde; Prince Chinguli; Princess Yamvu; Princess Lukokesha Mema Kafu Mbwita
Queen Yamvu	Prince Katongo, Prince Chiti, Prince Nkole
King Nkonde	Prince Chinguli; Prince Chimbangala; Prince Yambayamba; Prince Nkonde; Prince Chombe
King Chinguli cha Nkonde	Princess Mbaao; Prince Nkonde; Prince Luputa
Queen Mbaao ya Chinguli	Princess Kaamba; Princess Mbayi; Prince Kwandu; Prince Chondela; Prince Yanike Alberto

== Mbunda Kingdom in south-eastern Angola ==
Name	Descendants
Vamwene Kaamba ka Mbaao	Prince Chingwanja; Prince Mulondola; Prince Ndongo; Princess Muyeji; Princess Katheketheke
King Chingwanja cha Kaamba	Prince Lweembe; Prince Nkonde; Prince Nkombwe; Prince Ndongo; Prince Mwiinga; Prince Kamenga; Princess Vipalo; Prince Luputa
King Lweembe lwa Chingwanja	Prince Katete; Prince Mununga; Prince Kathangila; Prince Chondela; Princess Mukenge
King Katete ka Lweembe	
Queen Mukenge wa Lweembe Livindamo	Prince Kathangila; Princess Naama; Princess Chioola; Princess Muulo; Princess Mununga

== Migration to Moxico and Cuando Cubango ==
Name	Descendants
King Kathangila ka Mukenge	Prince Yambayamba Kapanda; Prince Chingumbe; Princess Mpande; Princess Kamana; Princess Muulo
King Yambayamba Kapanda	Princess Mukombe; Princess Xwaka; Prince Munamwene Muyakata; Prince Munamwene Chikungwe; Prince Munamwene Nambwa
King Chingumbe	Prince Nkombwe Kapamuka; Prince Yembe Katete; Prince Chitengi Chingumbe Chiyengele; Princess Kakuhu; Prince Mpili
King Mwene Chitengi Chingumbe Chiyengele	Prince Ngulungu.
King Mwene Ngonga I Chiteta	Prince Kathaka; Prince Lyangongama; Prince Vunonge; Prince Liwanika
King Nyumbu Luputa lwa Mpande
King Ngonga II Linjengele Kawewe	
King Katavola I Mwechela	
King Katavola II Muthangu
King Mwene Mbandu I Lyondthzi Kapova	Prince Mumbamba Lyondthzi; Prince Limbwambwa Kalyangu Lyondthzi; Prince Kalimbwe Lyondthzi; Prince Kameya Muyeji Lyondthzi
King Mbandu II Kathzungo Xaanda	
King Mbandu III Mbandu Lifuti	

== Gallery ==
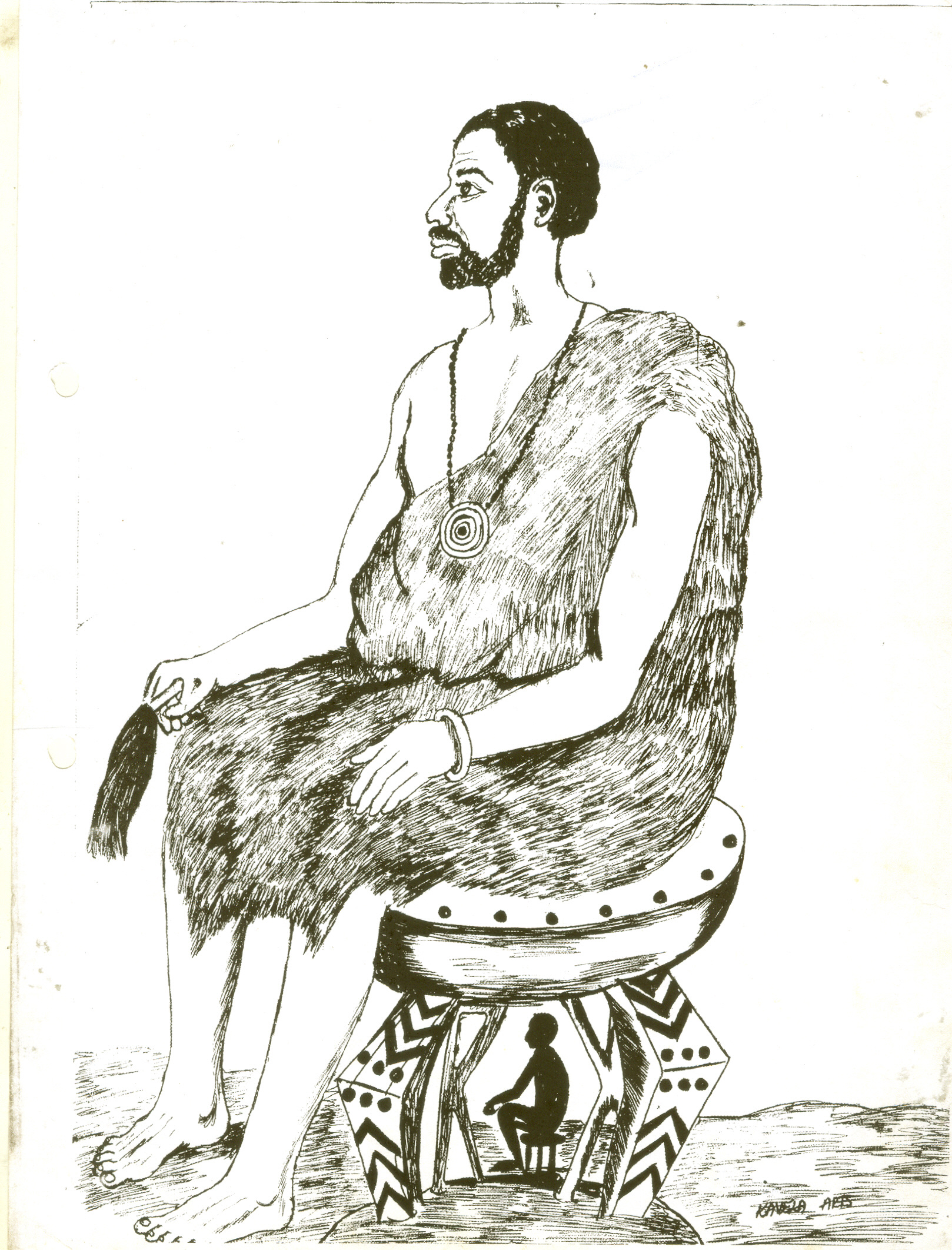
King Mbandu I Lyondthzi Kapova, the 21st Monarch

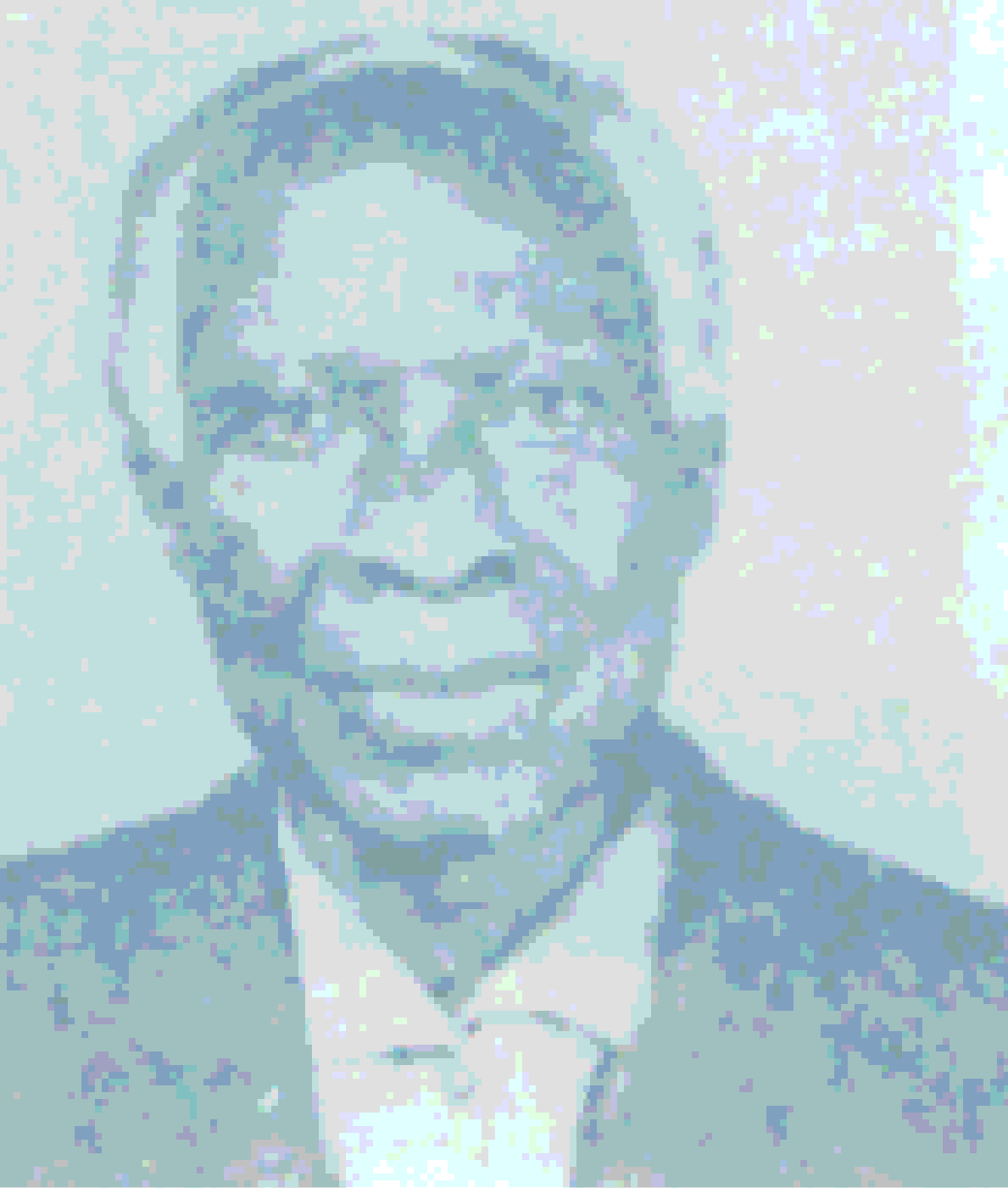
King Mbandu II Kathzungo Xaanda, the 22nd Monarch

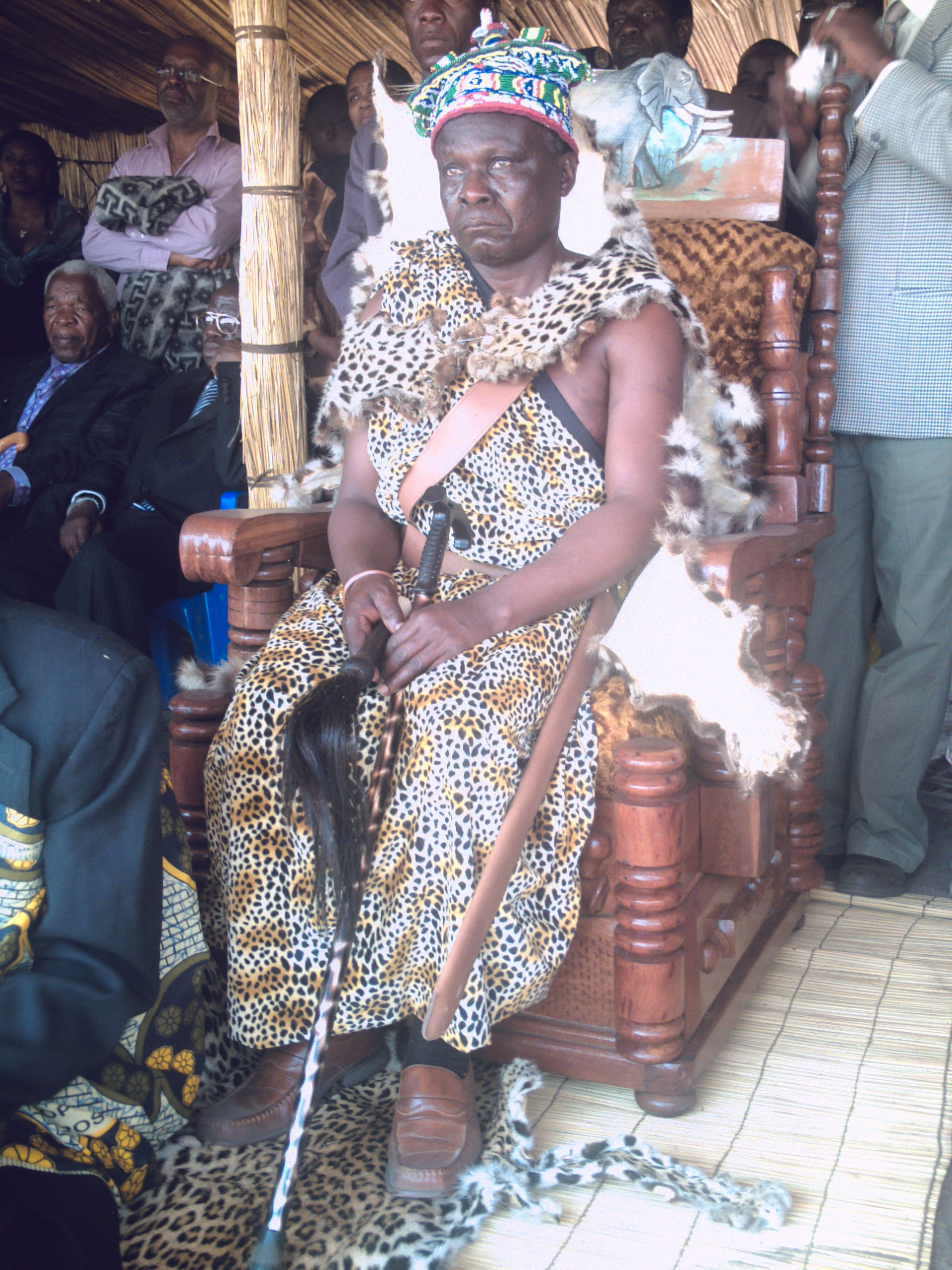
King Mwene Mbandu III Mbandu Lifuti at His coronation in 2008

== See also ==
- Mbunda Kingdom
- Mbunda language
- Mbunda people
- List of Mbunda Chiefs in Zambia
