= Mbunda language =

Bantu language spoken in Angola and Zambia

Coordinates: 14°06′44″S 21°26′07″E

Mbunda
- Mbúùnda, Chimbúùnda
- Native to: Angola, Zambia
- Ethnicity: Mbunda people
- Native speakers: (260,000 cited 2000–2010)
- Language family: Niger–Congo?: Atlantic–Congo; Volta-Congo; Benue–Congo; Bantoid; Southern Bantoid; Bantu (Zone K); Chokwe–Luchazi (K.10); Mbunda

Language codes
- ISO 639-3: mck – inclusive code Individual codes: yax – Yauma dialect nkn – Nkangala dialect
- Glottolog: mbun1249 Mbunda nkan1238 Nkangala
- Guthrie code: K.15,18
- ELP: Yauma

Mbunda is a Bantu language of Angola and Zambia. There are several dialects: Katavola, Yauma, Nkangala, Mbalango, Sango, Ciyengele ("Shamuka"), and Ndundu, all of which are closely related. Mbunda was one of six languages selected by the Instituto de Línguas Nacionais (National Languages Institute) for an initial phase to establish spelling rules in 1980 to facilitate teaching in schools and promoting its use.

== Sounds ==
Mbunda is similar to Luchazi, but has some differences in the consonants. Among other differences, where Luchazi has /s, z/, Mbunda has /θ, ð/. Where Luchazi has /ts/, Mbunda has dental /t̪/.

=== Vowels ===
Like other languages in eastern Angola and Zambia, Mbunda language has five contrastive vowels:

	Front (unrounded)	Central (unrounded)	Back (rounded)
high	i		u
mid	ɛ		ɔ
low		a	

=== Consonants ===
Voiced plosives only occur as prenasalized stops, where they contrast with aspirated plosives. Otherwise only tenuis plosives are found in Mbunda.

Prenasalized consonants
Aspirated	Voiced	Place of formation	Sample	Word Sound	Translation
/mpʰ/ mp	/mb/ mb	bilabial	mbandu		sore
/nt̪ʰ/ nths	/nd̪/ ndthz	dental	ndthzili		power
/ntʰ/ nt	/nd/ nd	alveolar	ndolome		brother
—	/ndʒ/ nj	alveopalatal	njamba		elephant
/ŋkʰ/ nk	/ŋɡ/ ng	velar	ngonde		moon

== Orthography ==
Graphic Representation	Phonetic Symbol(*)	Word Example	Word Sound	Translation
a	/a/	angula		choose
mb	/mb/	mbunga		crowd
ch (used with nouns) or c	/tʃ/	cili		true
ch (used with nouns) or c	/tʃ/	chiyambi		hunter
nd	/nd/	ndumba		lion
e	/ɛ/	ewa		yes
f	/f/	fundanga		gunpowder
ng	/ŋɡ/	ngombe		cow, ox
ŋ	/ŋ/	ŋala		crab
h	/h/	hanja		outside
i	/i/	imanena		wait
j	/ʒ/	jombolola		reveal
k	/k/	kovela		enter
l	/l/	lilonga		plate, dish
m	/m/	mulonga		offence
n	/n/	naana		my mother
ndthz	/nd̪/	ndthzita		war
nk	/ŋkʰ/	nkuta		court
ny	/ɲ/ or maybe /nʲ/	nyali		brother or sister-in-law
o	/ɔ/	owo		that one
p	/p/	putuka		start
mp	/mpʰ/	mpulu		male animal
t	/t/	tulo		asleep, sleepy
th	/θ/	thimbu		time
ths	/t̪/	thsa		die
thz	/ð/	thzala		dress up
u	/u/	uli		where is he (she)
v	/β/	vwato		boat, canoe
w	/w/	wahi		he (she) is not here
x	/ʃ/	xwata		forest
y	/j/	yange		myself

Orthographies of six languages of Angola,

== Population ==
Mbunda is spoken by the Mbunda people of the Moxico Province and Cuando Cubango Province of Angola and western Zambia. upon the migration of among others, the Ciyengele,

== Dialects ==
The Mbunda language is not spoken exactly the same way in Zambia and Angola. In Zambia it has a strong upper teeth contact with the tongue, to pronounce words like: Mundthzindthzime 'shadow', chithzalo 'dress', Kuthsa 'death' and many more. The difficult sounds represented by ⟨TH⟩. Mbunda language in Angola and Namibia is spoken without the ⟨TH⟩ sounds (interdentals), like in the Luchazi language; the words above are pronounced as Mutzitzime 'shadow', chizalo 'cloth', Kutsa 'death'. Even within Zambia, the Mbunda language spoken by the Chiyengele group that migrated earlier is different from that spoken by the Mbunda group that fled into Zambia as a consequence of the Mbunda-Portuguese war of 1914. That is why the Mbunda language of the Chiyengele group, mainly found in Mongu, is nicknamed "Shamuka", heavily influenced by Lozi language. The same term can be attributed to the Mbunda language in Namibia, which is heavily influenced by the Nyemba and Luchazi languages.

== Numerals ==
Numerical counting in Mbunda follows the usual numerals but in Mbunda words. Fill ups are easily made using small numerals.

1 Chimo

2 Vivali

3 Vitatu

4 Viwana

5 Vitanu

6 Vitanu na chimo

7 Vitanu na vivali

8 Vitanu na vitatu

9 Vitanu na viwana

10 Likumi

11 Likumi na chimo

20 Makumi avali

22 Makumi avali na vivali

30 Makumi atatu

33 Makumi atatu na vitatu

40 Makumi awana

44 Makumi awana na viwana

50 Makumi atanu

55 Makumi atatu na vitanu

60 Makumi atanu na limo

66 Makumi atanu na limo na vitanu na chimo

70 Makumi atanu na avali

77 Makumi atanu na avali na vitanu na vivali

80 Makumi atanu na atatu

88 Makumi atanu na atatu na vitanu na vitatu

90 Makumi atanu na awana

99 Makumi atanu na awana na vitanu na viwana

100 Chiita

101 Chiita na kamo

110 Chiita na likumi

111 Chiita na likumi na kamo

152 Chiita na makumi atanu na tuvali

163 Chiita na makumi atanu na limo na tutanu

174 Chiita na makumi atanu na availi na tuwana

185 Chiita na makumi atanu na atatu na tutanu

186 Chiita na makumi atanu na atatu na tutanu na kamo

197 Chiita na makumi atanu na awana na tutanu na tuvali

200 Viita vivali

201 Viita vivali na kamo

300 Viita vitatu

400 Viita viwana

500 Viita vitanu

600 Viita vitanu na chimo

700 Viita vitanu na vivali

800 Viita vitanu na vitatu

900 Viita vitanu na viwana

1,000 Likulukathzi

1,111 Likulukathzi na chiita na likumi na kamo

2,000 Makulukathzi avali

3,000 Makulukathzi atatu

4,000 Makulukathzi awana

5,000 Makulukathzi atanu

6,000 Makulukathzi atanu na limo

7,000 Makulukathzi atanu na avali

8,000 Makulukathzi atanu na atatu

9,000 Makulukathzi atanu na awana

10,000 Likumi lya makulukathzi

11,111 likumi lya makulukathzi na likulukathzi na chiita na likumi na kamo

20,000 Makumi avali amakulukathzi

30,000 Makumi atatu amakulukathzi

40,000 Makumi awana amakulukathzi

50,000 Makumi atanu amakulukathzi

60,000 Makumi atanu na limo amakulukathzi

70,000 Makumi atanu na avali amakulukathzi

80,000 makumi atanu na atatu amakulukathzi

90,000 makumi atanu na awana amakulukathzi

100,000 chiita cha makulukathzi

200,000 viita vivali vya makulukathzi

300,000 viita vitatu vya makulukathzi

400,000 viita viwana vya makulukathzi

500,000 viita vitanu vya makulukathzi

600,000 viita vitanu na chimo vya makulikathzi

700,000 viita vitanu na vivali vya makulukathzi

800,000 viita vitanu na vitatu vya makulukathzi

900,000 viita vitanu na viwana vya makulukathzi

1,000,000 likulukathzi lya makulukathzi

== Names and meanings ==
Mbunda names are many; listed are the ones commonly used. They can be given either to a male or female, except a very few that are for females only and have been indicated here by (f). Some Mbunda names are similar to those of other nationalities which also have their roots in the Luba Kingdom, such as Kaunda, Katongo, Kavanda, Mulenga, Muvanga, Mwila, Kavunda, Kalunga, Muti, Chiinga, Kavalata, Chiti, Nkonde and others. Also similar to Mbunda names are Chipoya, Chipango, Musole, Kayata, Ngambo, Kawengo, Kapisa and Musumali, found in other ethnic groups which trace their origins to Mwantiyavwa the king of the Ruund. These similarities give further evidence that Mbunda people interacted with the Kingdom of Lunda and Kingdom of Luba, in the 15th century. The commonly used Mbunda names are as follows:

- Chendamundali (pl. vacendamundali) 'tourist'
- Chalula 'someone who found (picked) a lost thing'
- Chambato 'a bridegroom'
- Changoco 'a useless person'
- Changano 'an "I don't care" person'
- Chavaya 'a destitute person'
- Chikatu 'source'
- Chilala 'cruelty'
- Chiinga 'substitute or substitution'
- Chiingi 'the substitute wife from same family as first wife'
- Chilindo 'the float of fish net'
- Chilombo 'a place where things are put to soak or dye'
- Chilunda 'the second born'
- Chimbali 'the slave of a white person'
- Chimbinde 'a cantankerous person, cruel'
- Chindele 'a white person'
- Chindumba 'a kind of hair plait'
- Chingumbe 'a strong and healthy man'. Name of the 14th Mbunda King who ruled Mbundaland in the 17th century in what is now Angola
- Chingunde 'moroseness, sullenness'
- Chingwali 'a shackle for the head, a fetter'
- Chinjenge 'to be left in hardship'
- Chinunga 'an articulated joint'
- Chinyundu 'a beehive smoker (to rid the hive of bees)'
- Chioola 'a quiet person; sober'
- Chipango 'the fence built for a woman giving birth'
- Chipipa 'to swish or whip through the air'
- Chipoya 'a machile or hammock'
- Chiputa 'a type of shrub; bush'
- Chixwaxwa (Chishwashwa) 'an empty light shell'
- Chiti 'wood or tree'
- Chitumbo 'a big heap of soil'
- Chitundu 'a type of plant with an edible tuber'
- Chiyengele 'a red cloth belt'. Name of the Senior Mbunda Chief in Bulozi, declared by King Mulena Mulambwa of the Aluyi people
- Chiyengo 'big barrel'
- Chuma 'thing'
- Kaalu 'a surviving twin'
- Kavavu 'June'
- Kafunya 'a presumptuous person'
- Kafuti 'the child born after twins'
- Kailu 'the child born after five children's death, regarded as a "returned" person'
- Kaliki 'the chief's storehouse'
- Kaliye 'being lonely'
- Kalimbwe (vulimbwe) 'a person using birdlime to catch birds'
- Kalumbu for females, 'a stray person who has lost her good character'
- Kaliata (Kalyata) 'a person who oppresses others'
- Kaliangu (Kalyangu) 'a kind of jester or masked dancer'
- Kamana 'a wise person'
- Kanjengo 'white cloth'
- Kankondo 'a kind of weasel that eats fowls'
- Kanjonja 'a type of gun; flintlock'
- Kanunga 'a small joint'
- Kapatitho (Kapatiso) 'bolt fastener'
- Kapitha (Kapisa) 'a person who refuses to help because he is miserly and stingy or who burns something'
- Kaxweka (Kashweka) 'a hidden thing'
- Kaxukwe (Kashukwe) 'August'
- Kathoka (Kasoka) 'a person who loads the gun; rams the charge into the gun'
- Kathonda (Kasonda) (vuthampu - vusampu) 'a kind of coiffure'
- Katavola 'a person who tears something apart'. Name of the famous 20th Mbunda King who fought and defeated the Chokwe people in what is now Angola
- Katota 'a person who knocks or hammers on something'
- Katongo 'a wanderer'
- Kaulembi (kulamba) 'a person who goes to appeal for help'
- Kavindama 'an unfortunate person'
- Kavunda 'a person who smears the concrete floor'
- Kawengo 'the spirit of a deceased woman'
- Kayando 'a sufferer, trouble'
- Kayawe 'a cunning person'
- Kayongo 'the spirit of a deceased man'
- Kathzungo (Kazungo) 'noise or racket'. Name of the 22nd Mbunda King who was installed by the Portuguese colonialists, after abducting King Mwene Mbandu I Lyondthzi Kapova, the 21st Monarch of Mbundaland in what is now Angola
- Kufuna 'to and fro'. (Not Mbunda by origin but used today)
- Kalunga 'God'
- Kuunga 'to gather'
- Kuvangu see Kawengo
- Lifuti 'country'. Name of the 23rd Mbunda King and the first to be installed by the Mbunda people after the restoration of the Mbunda monarchy in what is now Angola, since the abduction of the 21st Mbunda King who resisted the Portuguese occupation of Mbundaland in 1914
- Likonge 'a kind of water grass'
- Liongo 'a river reed'
- Livindamo 'an unlucky village or place'
- Luvinda 'hard luck or misfortune'
- Liwoyo 'racket, noise'
- Lumbala is the name of a river in eastern Angola
- Liato (Lyato) 'a big canoe'
- Liunda (Lyunda) 'grove'
- Maamba 'evil spirits possessing people'
- Makayi 'bracelets'
- Makalu 'a brave person'
- Makuwa from (kulikuwa) 'someone who shouts when rejoicing'
- Maliti 'a type of rifle, a single loader'
- Manjolo 'tubular anklets'
- Manyenga 'a worried person, also means to render fat'
- Mathambo (Masambo) 'small wires'
- Matheka (Maseka), see Makayi
- Mathumba (Masumba) 'crescent shaped medallions'
- Mbaita (f) 'please pass, to allow to pass'
- Mbalili (f) 'keg, barrel'
- Mbambale 'the spinning device used by Mbunda'
- Mbandu 'sore'. Name of the 21st Mbunda King who resisted the Portuguese occupation of Mbundaland in 1914 in what is now Angola
- Mbundi (f) 'a fetish stick'
- Mukovoto 'a talkative person'
- Mukuve 'a kind of tree for bark rope'
- Mukwita 'a passer-by; to pass by'
- Mulenga 'a piece of wood split off a tree struck by thunder and lightning'
- Mulemba 'a kind of tree that produces rubber'
- Mulikita 'great big-game hunter, also boxer'
- Muliata (Mulyata), see Kaliata (Kalyata)
- Mundanya see Mathumba (Masumba)
- Mundu (kaundu) 'medicine rubbed on the body to make it impervious to bullets'. Name of the first Mbunda Chief who migrated to Bulozi in the 16th century
- Mundthzimba 'an ignorant person'
- Mununga 'a person who joins things together'
- Muthando (Musando) 'millet'
- Muthangu (Musangu) 'a resurrected person'
- Muxova (Mushova) (f) 'mixed things'
- Muxuwa (Mushuwa) (f) 'a tree with little leaves, see mulemba'
- Muthompa (Musompa) 'a judge'
- Muti (chiti) 'tree'
- Muvanga 'a kind of shrub; also means firstborn'
- Muwae (f) 'beauty'
- Muyeva see Katongo
- Muyenga 'to render fat or beeswax'
- Muyombo (muxaa - mushaa) 'a type of fetish stick'
- Mwila 'grass'
- Ndandula 'he must follow'
- Ndombelo 'a young girl who pounds white maize into theke (seke) which is used in ritual offerings (nombelo) to ancestral spirits'
- Ndumba 'lion'
- Ngeve 'female twins or Female Hippo'
- Ngongola see Katota
- Nguvu 'male twins; also hippopotamus'
- Njamba 'elder of the twins; also elephant'
- Nkumbwa 'ostrich'
- Nyumbu 'a type of swamp reed'
- Nyundu 'otter'
- Thakulo (Sakulo) 'a kind of grass used for thatching'
- Theke (Seke) 'white maize meal used for offerings to ancestral spirits'
- Viemba (Vyemba) 'medicines'
- Vulungi 'trekking to new settlement'
- Xanda (Shanda), 'battle, honey badger'. Name of the 22nd Mbunda King who was installed by the Portuguese colonialists, after abducting King Mwene Mbandu I Lyondthzi Kapova, the 21st Monarch of Mbundaland in what is now Angola
- Wacama (the abbreviation of waca manene) 'you like something very much'
- Wampata 'an argumentative or stubborn person'

== See also ==
- Mbunda Kingdom
- Mbunda people

== Literature ==
- Jacky Maniacky, 1997, "Contribution à l'étude des langues bantoues de la zone K: analyse comparative et sous-groupements", Mémoire pour l'obtention du DEA de langues, littératures et sociétés, études bantoues, INALCO (Paris - France), 101p.
- José Redinha, 1975, Etnias e Culturas de Angola, Luanda: Instituto de Investigação Científica de Angola; reprinted fac-simile by the Associação das Universidades de Língua Portuguesa, 2009, ISBN 978 989 8271 00 6
