= Luvale people =

Ethnic group of Angola/Zambia

The Luvale people, also spelled Lovale, Balovale, Lubale, as well as Lwena or Luena in Angola, are a Bantu ethnic group found in northwestern Zambia and southeastern Angola. They are closely related to the Lunda and Ndembu to the northeast, but they also share cultural similarities to the Kaonde to the east, and to the Chokwe and Luchazi, important groups of eastern Angola.

== Language ==
The Luvale language belongs to the larger Niger-Congo language phylum, and is considered a west central Bantu language. It is recognized as a regional language for educational and administrative purposes in Zambia, where 168,000 people speak it (2006).

== History ==
Prior to settling in the Congo, the Luvale originally came from north of Lake Tanganyika in an area located between the Eastern Rift mountains and Lake Victoria. Oral tradition holds that the first leader among these migrants was Kenga Naweji. During the migration south, she became too old to move, and set up her first camp at Lake Tanganyika. The trek then continued on until they reached the present day Democratic Republic of Congo. This is where the Luvale dynasty originated from Konde Mateti, who had 6 children. The first was Chinguli, believed to be the founder of the tribes in the north of Namibia and south of Angola. The second was Chinyama cha Mukwamayi, the founder of the Luvale chieftainship. Then came Kalumbu, a girl who was followed by a boy called Ndonji, commonly associated with Chokwe. The fifth was another boy called Lukombo who died at an early age. Last to be born was Lueji, a girl- future queen of the Lunda. She would go on to fall in love with the adventurer hunter Tshibinda Ilunga, a Luba prince. This enraged her brothers Chinguli and Chinyama so much that they split from the Lunda. Chinguli was the first to leave and headed southwest, establishing his own chieftainship. He was later followed by his brothers, Chinyama cha Mukwamayi and Ndonji, and his sister, Kalumbu, who went on to found their tribes. Chinyama, still in pursuit of more land, established the Kakenge chieftainship around 1747 near the Lumbala stream in Angola.

=== Atlantic slave trade ===
The Luvale were the first in the Upper Zambezi to receive Ovimbundu traders from Angola in the 18th century. The Ovimbundu were seeking slaves for the Portuguese and had been spurned by their Lozi partners. Generally, they were not interested in taking the slaves themselves, but preferred to buy them for guns, cloth, jewelry, and other goods. Through their participation, the Luvale became a force to reckon with, and raided nearby tribes to procure slaves for the Ovimbundu. By the mid 19th century, guns were widespread in both Luvale society and culture, and travellers' accounts noted that practically all the major chiefs were also important slave traders. Chiefs Nyakatolo and Kangombe Kayambi were two particular Luvale that became notorious for their involvement in the slave trade. The Luvale also augmented their wealth by exacting payments from caravans, in exchange for passing through their areas uninterrupted. The Luvale would continually expand their domain in search of new raiding targets, coming to clash with the Southern Lunda chieftainships in particular. The slave trade would reach its peak in the 1830s and 1840s, before slowly dying out by the turn of the century.

Starting in the 1890s, Luvale slaving parties carried out a series of attacks against the Lunda, which came to be known as "the Wars of Ulamba." In an unprecedented move, the Lunda chief Ishinde appealed to the Barotse's leader, Lewanika, for aid against the Luvale. Lewanika, seeking to consolidate his grip over the region, sent a military contingent against the Luvale. The Luvale's slave raiding activities were only completely stopped by British conquest in the early 20th century. In 1907, the slaves in the part of the Upper Zambezi under British administration were officially freed, but a system of debt slavery continued on a limited scale for decades.

=== European rule ===
Barotseland and its neighbors were brought under formal British influence with the signing of the Lochner Concession in 1890 between Lewanika and the British South Africa Company (BSAC). Lewanika had made the claim that the Upper Zambezi was under his domain, a valid statement in the eyes of the Barotse, as it was supported by their intervention in the Wars of Ulamba. BSAC, which was anxious to counter Portuguese claims, accepted the claim. Because it was advantageous to the interests of the Barotse and the BSAC, Balovale was henceforth considered to be a part of Barotseland. The Lunda, and especially the Luvale, were vehemently opposed to Barotse influence, and complained vigorously to a succession of District Commissioners that the historical justification used for Barotse rule was mistaken. Nevertheless, colonial administrators continued to support Barotse rule, and this would be reflected in the administration of the Barotse Province. Each 'recognized' Lunda and Luvale chief was nominally placed under of a Barotse induna; the language of local administration was Lozi, and all major decisions were referred to the Barotse Province headquarters in Mongu.

In 1941, Balovale was formally made independent from the rest of Barotseland. Years prior, Sir Hubert Young, the governor of Northern Rhodesia at the time, had signed a 1936 agreement with the Litunga and the Kuta, setting up Native Courts in Barotseland, including Balovale in it. The Luvale and Lunda opposed this, and refused to accept the jurisdiction of the Barotse courts. The two tribes argued that they should have been consulted for this agreement, and another meeting was held in Livingstone in 1937, attended by the Barotse, Lunda, and Luvale leaders. However, the opposing sides were unable to come to consensus, and it was decided that a commission should look at the claims of both sides. King George VI selected Philip MacDonell as the president of the commission for his prior experience as a judge in Northern Rhodesia and elsewhere. He visited the areas in question and interviewed witnesses, but upon MacDonell's return to England, the government became preoccupied with WWII, and a final decision took some years to be made. On July 9, 1941, the Northern Rhodesia Government Gazette announced the change, stating that the King's Commissioner found that the land in the Balovale district did not belong to the Barotse. In accordance with this finding, it was decided that the Lunda and Luvale were entitled to be free from Barotse influence, and will have their own Native Courts, Native Authorities, and Native Treasuries.

=== Post independence ===
Luvale and Lunda ethnic strife reached such an intensity that States of Emergency had to be declared in the Zambezi District in the 1940s and 1950s. On August 27, 1998, conflict between the Luvale and Lunda once again erupted in northwestern Zambia, leaving hundreds homeless. Zambian President Chiluba had appointed only Lunda to top positions in local government in the region, widening ethnic divisions.

== Society and culture ==
=== Society ===
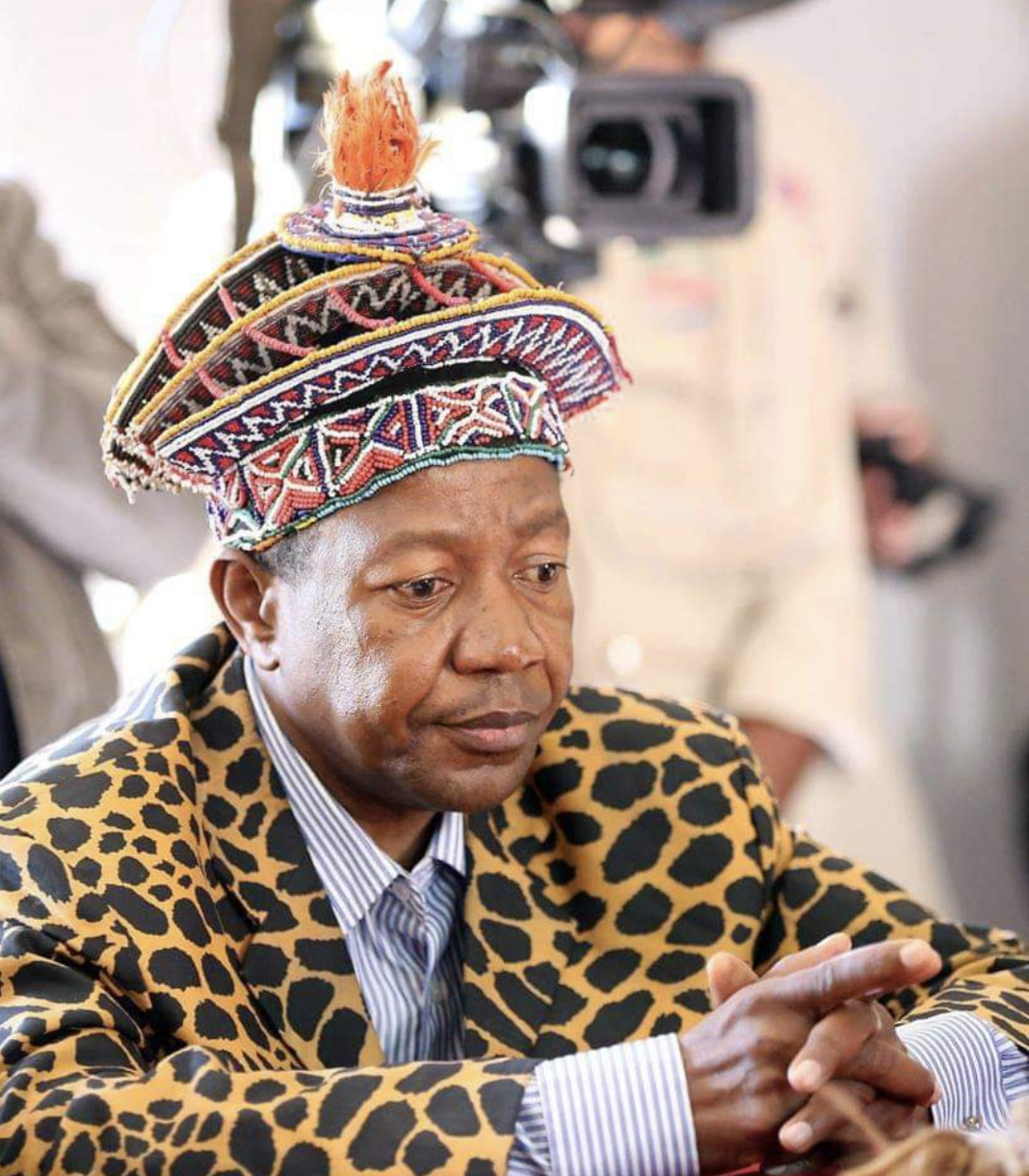
Senior Chief Ndungu the 8th of the Luvale people of Zambezi district until his death on 27 January 2020

The Luvale observe matrilineal descent and prefer cross cousin marriage. Commoner lineage groups play a bigger role than in other northwestern Zambian peoples, and are rather independent of the chiefs. Traditionally, the Luvale do not recognize a paramount leader, but instead pledge allegiance to local chiefs who inherit their positions matrilineally from the maternal uncle. Chiefs ('Mwana nganga') consult with a committee of elders and ritual specialists before making decisions. Villages are divided into manageable sections, which are governed by family headmen. All members of Luvale society are divided into two categories, those descended from the founding matrilineal lines and descended from former enslaved populations.

With the advent of colonialism however, a senior chief became custom, referred to as Chief Ndungu. Of the thirteen clans ('miyachi') that make up the Luvale tribe, only the 'NamaKungu' has members who can ascend to the throne. Only children of a female chief ('vamyangana') can rule. A child of a male chief is called Mwana Uta or 'child of the bow', and can never become a chief. All clans have totems or identifiers (mostly animals) such as hawks, owls, and fish. According to C.M.N. White, a British civil servant who spent many years in the area, each clan has a legendary explanation of how it arose, and a clan recitation ('kulisasula jikumbu') of which identifies a clan member. On July 28, 2020, the Luvale royal establishment selected Chinyama Ngundu as the new senior chief, as his predecessor (and uncle) died January of that year. However, his ascension remains disputed by other Luvale chiefs.

=== Art ===
The Luvale are noted for their masks, many of which are danced during initiation ceremonies to educate the initiates and to mark the territory where the ceremonies take place. They are skilled craftsmen known for making baskets, weaving mats ("visalo") pottery, metalwork ('"utengo") and stools. Some stools are made exclusively from wood, while some may feature a hide seat on a wooden frame called "likupu". The most commonly made basket is the "mbango", a medium-sized basket for storing grain or maize meal. They also make musical instruments such as the "jinjimba" (a xylophone), the "likembe" (a small hand piano), and a variety of drums.

=== Religion ===
The Luvale recognize Kalunga, a sky god of creation and supreme power; it's held that it has power over every other deity and is omniscient and all seeing. Additionally, Kalunga holds jurisdiction over the spirits of both the living and the dead, blessing the good and punishing the wicked. The Luvale also recognize the mahamba, nature and ancestral spirits. These spirits may belong to the individual, the family, or the community, and must be appeased through offerings in order to maintain good fortune. Evil spirits may also be activated by sorcerers ("orwanga") to cause illness, and must be counteracted to regain health. To accomplish this, individuals will consult with a diviner ("nganga"), who will attempt to uncover the source of the patient's problem. The most common form of divination among Luvale involves basket divination, which consists of the tossing of up to sixty individual objects in a basket. The configuration of the objects is then "read" by the diviner to determine the cause of illness.

=== Festivals ===
==== Likumbi Lya Mize ====
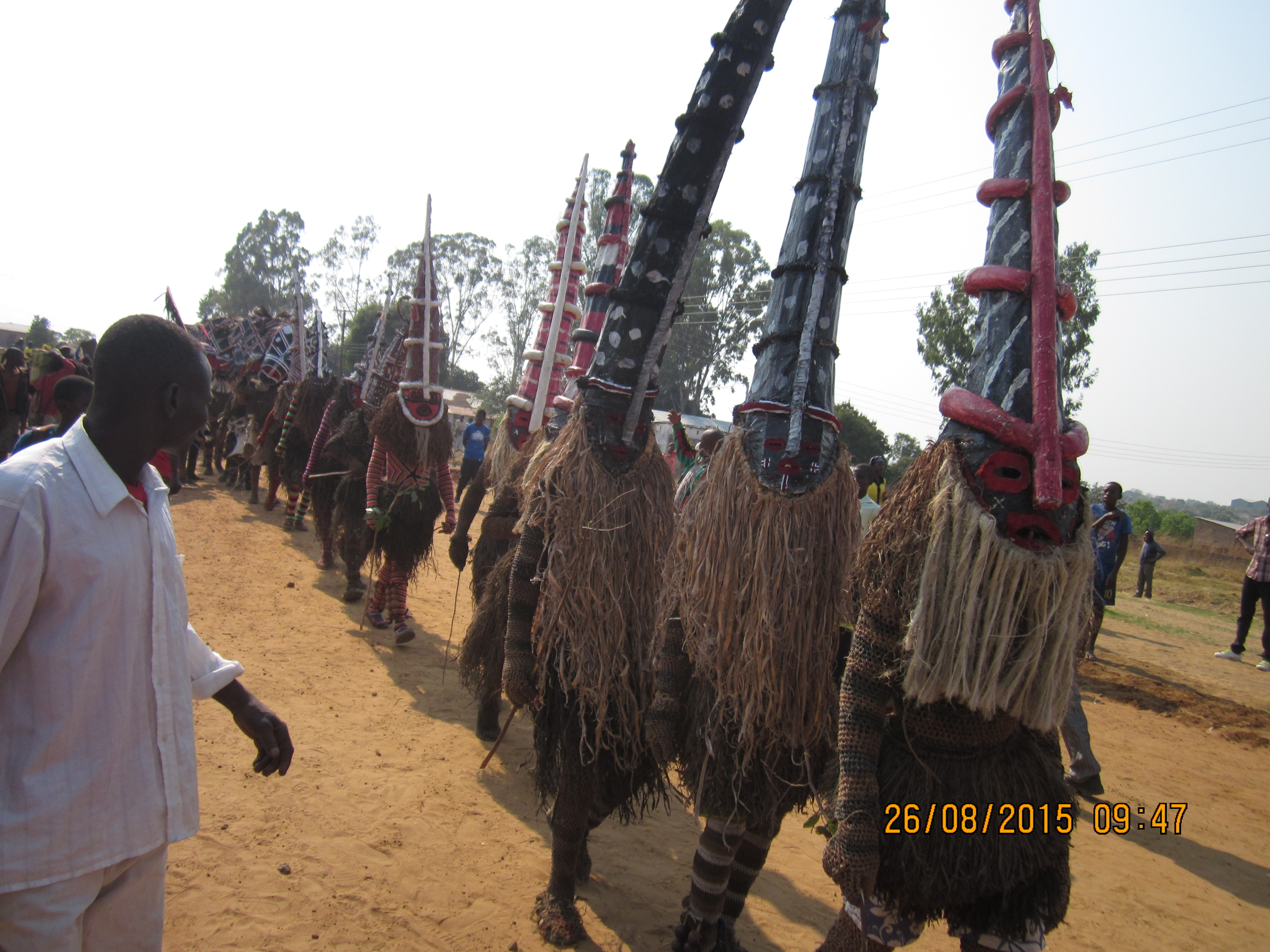

The official traditional ceremony is Likumbi Lya Mize, and is one of the most popular traditional festivals in Zambia. Taking place during the last weekend of August, it includes two initiation ceremonies, one for girls and one for boys. The name translates to "ceremony of the Mize" which is the name of the headquarters of the Luvale and is located in the town of Zambezi in North Western Province. The ceremony generally lasts a week and includes activities such as dancing by masked male dancers ("makishi") and by girls who have undergone the "wali" initiation ceremony, speeches by the chief and government officials, and drumming.

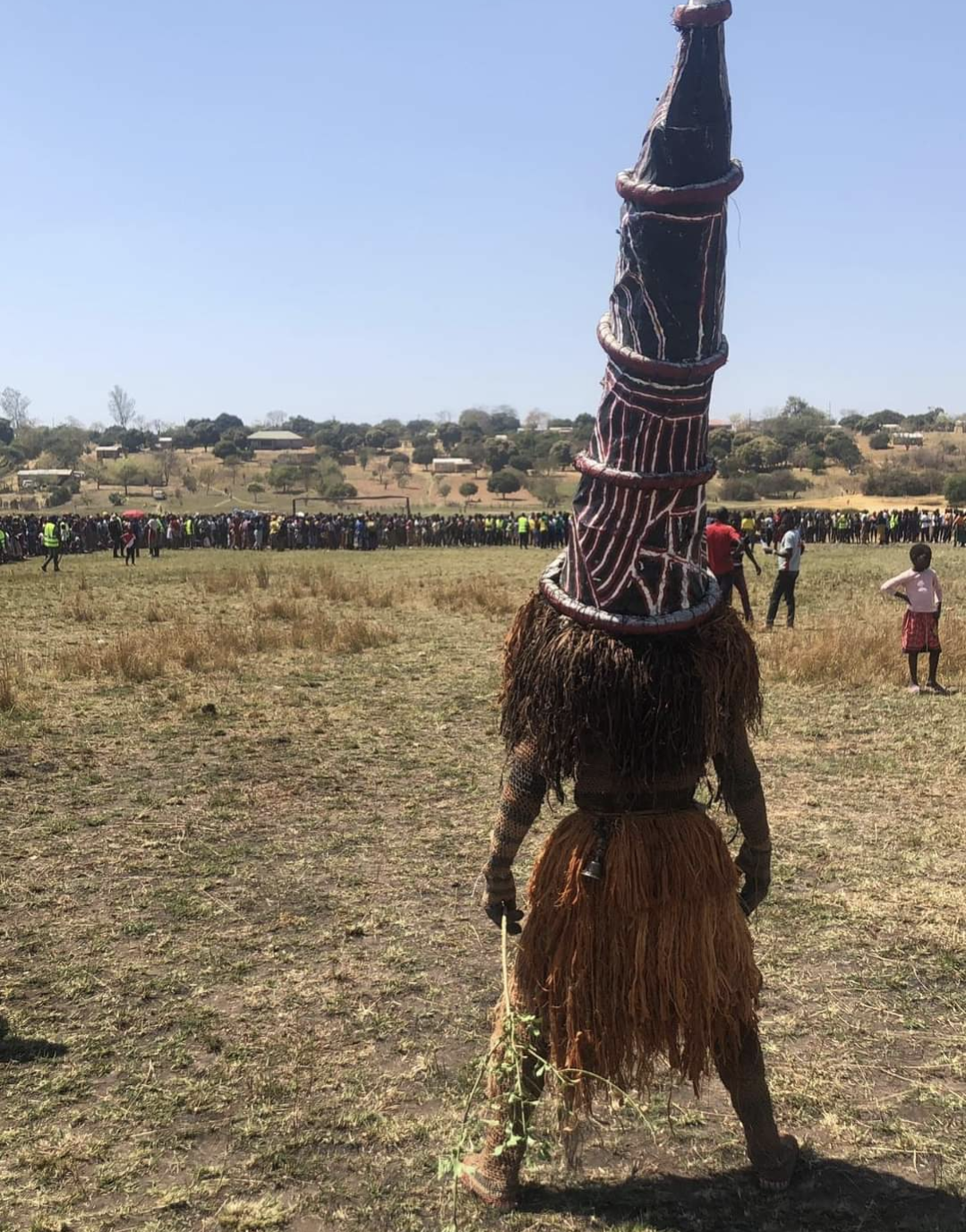
Likushi

==== Wali ====
The wali ceremony occurs when a girl begins her first menstruation cycle. She is taken into seclusion and brought to a fig tree ("muulya"), a symbol of fertility, where she remains until a grass hut ("litungu") is built for her. She is given protective medicine by an older woman who acts as a teacher and guide during the process ("chilombola"). The initiate (who is referred to as "mwali") is also assigned a younger girl ("kajilu" or "kasambibiijikilo") who helps with chores.

During the period of seclusion (which could last between four and six months), girls are prepared for marriage through being taught about hygiene, sex, and domestic chores. On the first day of their seclusion, the girl will make a girdle ("zeva") which she will wear for the duration of the ceremony. They are not allowed to run too fast, lie on her stomach, eat certain foods, be seen with members of the opposite sex, or speak unless necessary. She must also refrain from contact with fire, which is associated with life, and its absence, coldness, is symbolic of death; only her grandmother kindles the fire for her. When a girl returns to her village, she has to be covered in a traditional cotton cloth ("chitenge"). In recent times, seclusion lasts instead only a week to a month.

To graduate, she must perform various dances symbolizing the skills she has acquired. She is then covered in oil and red ochre. Afterwards, she is presented to her new husband. Due to a modernized legal system the initiation ceremony now happens later in a woman's life (before marriage) although it still happens at puberty for Luvale girls from rural areas. Child marriages are now illegal in Zambia, so even if a girl reaches puberty at 13 in a rural area, she may do the wali but not get married straight away. Previously, arranged marriages would take place, but in modern times, couples marry for love.

==== Mukanda ====
Luvale males between the ages of 8 and 12 will participate in the "mukanda", sometimes called the kumukanda, a coming age ceremony. It typically takes place at the beginning of the dry season. There are three distinct stages, the first being the preparation, which begins when a village headman ("chilolo") or important elder, having reached consensus with the families of young uncircumcised boys, publicly announces that the time for the mukanda has come. The candidates are then gathered together at the mukanda, where they are circumcised; at this stage, the initiator of the mukanda ceremony becomes known as the "chijika mukanda", or the "planter of mukanda." They will then invoke the spirits before the muyombo tree to bless and purify the children who will undergo the operation. The Luvale consider uncircumcised men dirty or unhygienic.

The second stage is the seclusion, where young boys will leave their homes and live for one to three months in an isolated bush camp. This separation from the outside world marks their symbolic death as children. It is said that in some very rural areas where the mukanda is strictly maintained that if a woman is to pass by the boy's "bush camp" whilst they are undergoing mukanda then she must be punished, even killed. The initiates ("vatunduji" or "tundanji") will undergo tests of courage and learn lessons on their future role as men and husbands. They will be taught skills such as making masks, or "makishi", wood-carving, basketry, smithing, and other practical skills. They are also allowed to play games and sports. The curriculum also includes cultural instruction in the ancient form of design and calculus known as "tusona", a tradition of ideographic tracings that are made in sand. Like the female initiates, the boys have teachers who guide them through the process. These are also referred to as "makishi" ("likishi" is the singular, meaning mask); each likishi has a distinct role. The makishi wear elaborate masks and dyed woven costumes made from barkcloth. The masks are made of wood and embellished with plant fiber, cordage, beads and other materials to convey the age, gender, social rank and power of the archetypes they embody. Signs and symbols on the masks are meant to indicate the forces of the universe. They represent the spirit of a deceased ancestor who returns to the world of the living to assist the boys in their transition from childhood to adulthood. During the ceremony, they will symbolically arise and assemble from the graveyard ("kuvumbuka"). Each boy is assigned a specific likishi, who remains with him throughout the entire process.

There are a variety of roles the makishi can take. Although all makishi are men (their identity is never revealed and it said that they dress in graveyards to shield themselves from the public), there are some female representations of women. The following list details many, though not all, of the possible makishi roles.

- The "Chisaluke" represents a powerful and wealthy man with spiritual influence.
- The "Mupala", or "Kayipu", is the "lord" or king of the mukanda and a protective spirit with supernatural abilities. It's always accompanied by "kapalu"– the bodyguard, or son. He is the biggest and most majestic of all the makishi, with his huge round impressive headdress, which is associated with the chief.
- The "Pwebo", or "Mwanapwebo", is a female character representing the ideal woman and is responsible for the musical accompaniment of the rituals and dances. Pwebo means 'woman' in the Luvale language.
- The "Chileya" represents a fool with a childish characteristic, mimicking others, dresses in an undignified fashion, and dances like a learner and not an expert.
- The "Chiwigi" is meant to represent a stylish and vain young woman, and wears a wig of braided hair.
- The "Chikungila" is an ambiguous ancestral spirit painted half red and half white; it is said to possess great spiritual power. The white and red halves of its mask are said to show a balance between the positive and the ominous, respectively.
- The "Utenu" is known as "the angry one"; always in a bad mood, always uttering insults.
- The "Katoyo", or "Chindele" originally mocked foreigners and outsiders; oftentimes, the colonial powers.
- The Katotola also possesses supernatural powers, the one who finds what is hidden.

The completion of the mukanda is celebrated with a graduation ceremony, the makishi masquerade. The boys are welcomed back into their community as adult men; the entire village is free to attend the makishi masquerade and pantomime- like performance. After the ritual, the makishi masks are burned or buried, symbolically returning them to the world of the dead. In recent times, masks have incorporated notions of the new; newer representations of makishi might include the face of a boom box, a VCR player, radio, or etc.

The mukanda has an educational function of transmitting practical survival-skills as well as knowledge about nature, sexuality, religious beliefs and the social values of the community. In former times, it took place over a period of several months and represented the entire reason behind the makishi masquerade. The practice is not unique to the Luvale, and is also performed by many other groups. Today, it is often reduced to one month in order to adapt to the school calendar. This adjustment together with the increasing demand for makishi dancers at social gatherings and party rallies, might affect the ritual's original character.

=== Marriage ===
As is custom, when a couple is ready to be married, the groom is required to pay a bride price to the woman's family. In Luvale, the bride price is called "matemo" or "vikumba" ( meaning 'things'). It is offered to the bride's ("mwenga") relatives as a sign of respect and appreciation.

A groom may welcome a bride with a small celebration ("vitilekela"). At this time, people of his village will greet the bride, encouraging her to be a good person and feed the village's children and strangers. Some days later, the bride goes through a ritual introducing her to her own hearth. This "lighting the fire" ritual characterizes all female transitions and is also performed for girls who have reached puberty and for new mothers. Sometime later the groom gives gifts ("vifupa wenga") to the bride's relatives which enable him to eat within their village or villages. This is followed by a return gift to the bride's matrilineal relatives which thereafter enables them to eat at the groom's village.

Traditionally, the groom was expected to provide everything in the marriage (a house, food, clothes), so the wife leaves her home without her personal items including clothing. However, in modern times due to economic reasons, intercultural marriages and urbanization, the wife usually brings her own kitchen items which are purchased for her as part of a pre-wedding ceremony called a kitchen party.

=== Food ===
The Luvale have a largely agrarian economy, and their staple crops are manioc, cassava, yams, and peanuts. Tobacco and hemp is grown for snuff, and maize is grown for beer. The farming and processing of agricultural products is done almost exclusively by the women of Luvale. Slash and burn techniques and crop rotation are practiced to naturally conserve the land. Pigs, chickens, sheep and goats are kept for domestic use.

There is an exclusive society of hunters called "yanga", who are responsible for catching bigger game, but everyone contributes to the capture of small game animals. However game has become scarce in much of their region. They are known for being renowned fishermen and export dried catfish to the mining centers of the Copperbelt.

=== Naming ===
Like many other African tribes, a child's name is usually influenced by the circumstances surrounding its birth. Children may be named according to the time and place of birth, events or circumstances of birth, birth order, or after kinsmen.

Immediately following the birth of a child, the midwife, also known as Chifungiji, bestows a temporary name upon the newborn. When the child's umbilical cord drops off, the parents, usually the father, will bestow a name upon the newborn. The mother is allowed to name the second child; grandparents and uncles may also name subsequent children. Once a child is named by its parents, this name will be permanently used in interactions. It is common that parents will greet the baby in words and songs, using a variety of names; the one that makes the baby smile or soothed is assumed to be the 'right' one. If the child continuously and habitually cries, this indicates the name is inadequate. The name must then be changed to another. This stems from the Luvale belief in reincarnation. Sometimes the name is changed if the child become seriously sick. In that case, a traditional healer ("chimbanda") will treat the child and select a new name, for it is believed the previous name is now associated with misfortune.

Examples of names given to describe circumstances include "Kahilu" meaning 'he who has returned/come back'. The female version is "Omba". Christianity has also had an impact on the naming culture with names being localized, for instance, 'Daniel' becomes 'Ndanyele'.

=== Lunda ===
The conflict between the Luvale and Lunda dates back to the Wars of Ulamba, when Luvale frequently raided Lunda settlements for slaves. The Luvale and Lunda have often come into conflict with one another since the 1940s; strife has further intensified over prime agricultural lands, given the region's poor soils. Both groups, in turn oppose their powerful Barotse neighbors to the south.

== Demographics ==
=== Zambia ===
In Zambia, they are found mainly in the North-Western Province of Zambia, centered in the town of Zambezi, previously known as Balovale. They make up approximately 20.4% of the population of the province. Some Zambian Luvale have left their ancestral lands, often for economic reasons, and can be found in other locations in Zambia such as the Lukanga Swamp. There is also considerable rural-to-urban migration to Lusaka.

=== Angola ===
In Angola they reside in the east of the Moxico Province.

=== South Africa ===
Some Luvale have migrated to South Africa and are often stigmatized as rustics; consequently, they've been frequently limited to the most menial of jobs.

== In popular culture ==
- In the Swedish 1997 murder mystery novel Faceless Killers, Inspector Kurt Wallander investigates a murderous racist attack on a refugee center in Skane and finds it difficult to communicate with a witness who speaks only the Luvale language. The problem is resolved when a 90-year-old former woman missionary is found, who speaks Luvale fluently and acts as the interpreter.
