= Scramble for Africa =

1870s–1914 European colonisation of Africa

Some pre-colonial states in Africa. The map notably misses numerous polities, such as the East African polities of Ajuran, Adal, Buganda, Rwanda, Kilwa, and Imerina; and many southern African kingdoms such as Mapungubwe, Rozvi, Maravi, Uukwanyama, and Mthwakazi.

Areas of Africa controlled by Western European colonial powers in 1913: Belgian (orange), British (pink), French (purple), German (blue), Italian (lime green), Portuguese (dark green), and Spanish (yellow) empires.

Areas of Africa controlled by Western European colonial empires in 1913, with current national boundaries superimposed Kingdom of Belgium France German Empire Kingdom of Italy Portugal Spain United Kingdom Independent

The Scramble for Africa (Note: Also known as the Partition of Africa, the Conquest of Africa, or the Rape of Africa) was the invasion, conquest, and colonisation of most of Africa by seven Western European powers, which were driven by the Second Industrial Revolution during the late 19th and early 20th centuries through the era of "New Imperialism". Belgium, France, Germany, Italy, Portugal, Spain and the United Kingdom were the contending powers.

The 1884–1885 Berlin Conference regulated European colonisation and trade in Africa, and is seen as emblematic of the "scramble". In the last quarter of the 19th century, there were considerable political rivalries among the European empires, which provided the impetus for the colonisation. The later years of the 19th century saw a transition from "informal imperialism" – military influence and economic dominance – to direct rule.

With the decline of the European colonial empires in the wake of the two world wars, most African colonies gained independence during the Cold War, and decided to keep their colonial borders in the Organisation of African Unity conference of 1964 due to fears of civil wars and regional instability, placing emphasis on pan-Africanism.

== Background ==
By 1841, businessmen from Europe had established small trading posts along the coasts of Africa, but they seldom moved inland, preferring to stay near the sea. They primarily traded with locals. Large parts of the continent were essentially uninhabitable for Europeans because of their high mortality rates from tropical diseases such as malaria. In the middle of the 19th century, European explorers mapped much of East Africa and Central Africa.

As late as the 1870s, Europeans controlled approximately 10% of the African continent, with all their territories located near the coasts. The most important holdings were Angola and Mozambique, held by Portugal; the Cape Colony, held by the United Kingdom; and Algeria, held by France. By 1914, only Ethiopia and Liberia remained outside European control, with the former eventually being occupied by Italy in 1936 and the latter having strong connections with the United States.

Technological advances facilitated European expansion overseas. Industrialization brought about rapid advancements in transportation and communication, especially in the forms of steamships, railways and telegraphs. Medical advances also played an important role, especially medicines for tropical diseases, which helped control their adverse effects. The development of quinine, an effective treatment for malaria, made vast expanses of the tropics more accessible for Europeans.

== Causes ==
=== Africa and global markets ===
Sub-Saharan Africa, one of the last regions of the world which was largely untouched by "informal imperialism", was attractive to business entrepreneurs. During a time when Britain's balance of trade showed a growing deficit, with shrinking and increasingly protectionist continental markets during the Long Depression (1873–1896), Africa offered Britain, Germany, France, and other countries an open market that would garner them a trade surplus: a market that bought more from the colonial power than it sold overall.

Surplus capital was often more profitably invested overseas, where cheap materials, limited competition, and abundant raw materials made a greater premium possible. Another inducement for imperialism arose from the demand for raw materials, especially ivory, rubber, palm oil, cocoa, diamonds, tea, and tin. Additionally, Britain wanted control of areas of the southern and eastern coasts of Africa for stopover ports on the route to Asia and its empire in India. But, excluding the area that became the Union of South Africa in 1910, European nations invested relatively limited amounts of capital in Africa.

Pro-imperialist colonial lobbyists such as the Alldeutscher Verband, Francesco Crispi and Jules Ferry, argued that sheltered overseas markets in Africa would solve the problems of low prices and overproduction caused by shrinking continental markets. John A. Hobson argued in Imperialism that this shrinking of continental markets was a key factor of the global "New Imperialism" period. William Easterly, however, disagrees with the link made between capitalism and imperialism, arguing that colonialism is used mostly to promote state-led development rather than corporate development. He has said that "imperialism is not so clearly linked to capitalism and the free markets... historically there has been a closer link between colonialism/imperialism and state-led approaches to development."

=== Strategic rivalry ===
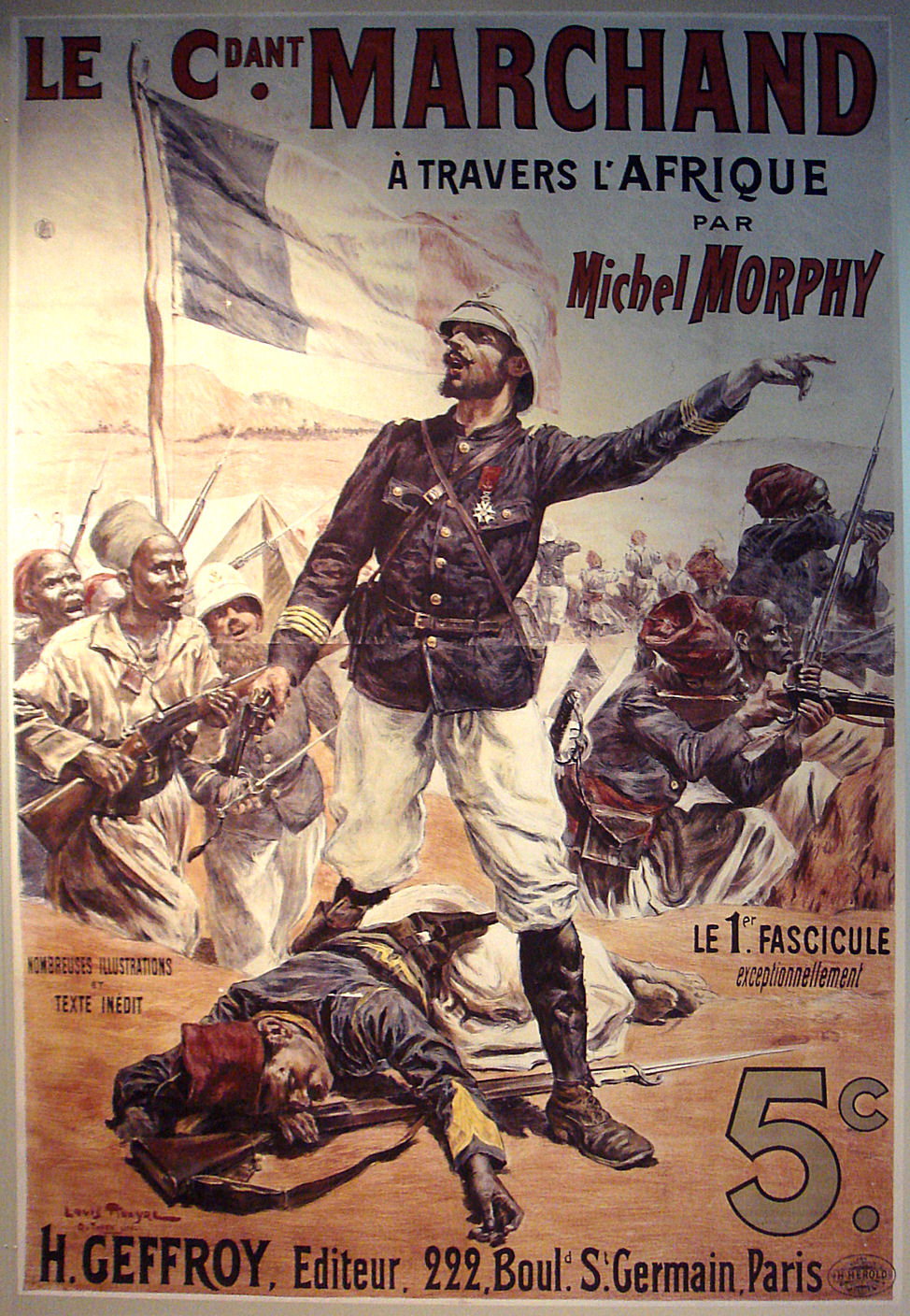
Contemporary French advertising poster for a series of booklets detailing Major Marchand's trek across Africa toward Fashoda in 1898

While tropical Africa was not a large zone of investment, other overseas regions were. The vast interior between Egypt and the gold and diamond-rich Southern Africa had strategic value in securing the flow of overseas trade. Britain was under political pressure to build up lucrative markets in India, Malaya, Australia and New Zealand. Thus, it wanted to secure the key waterway between East and West – the Suez Canal, completed in 1869. However, a theory that Britain sought to annex East Africa during 1880 onwards, out of geo-strategic concerns connected to Egypt (especially the Suez Canal), has been challenged by historians such as John Darwin (1997) and Jonas F. Gjersø (2015).

The scramble for African territory also reflected concern for the acquisition of military and naval bases, for strategic purposes and the exercise of power. The growing navies, and new ships driven by steam power, required coaling stations and ports for maintenance. Defence bases were also needed for the protection of sea routes and communication lines, particularly of expensive and vital international waterways such as the Suez Canal.

Colonies were seen as assets in balance of power negotiations, useful as items of exchange at times of international bargaining. Colonies with large native populations were also a source of military power; Britain and France used large numbers of British Indian and North African soldiers, respectively, in many of their colonial wars (and would do so again in the coming World Wars). In the age of nationalism there was pressure for a nation to acquire an empire as a status symbol; the idea of "greatness" became linked with the "White Man's Burden", or sense of duty, underlying many nations' strategies.

In the early 1880s, Pierre Savorgnan de Brazza was exploring the region along the Congo River for France, at the same time Henry Morton Stanley explored it on behalf of the Committee for Studies of the Upper Congo, backed by Leopold II of Belgium, who would have it as his personal Congo Free State. Leopold had earlier hoped to recruit Pierre Savorgnan de Brazza, but turned to Henry Morton Stanley when the former was recruited by the French government. France occupied Tunisia in May 1881, which may have convinced Italy to join the German-Austrian Dual Alliance in 1882, thus forming the Triple Alliance. The same year, Britain occupied Egypt (hitherto an autonomous state owing nominal fealty to the Ottoman Empire), which ruled over Sudan and parts of Chad, Eritrea, and Somalia. In 1884, Germany declared Togoland, the Cameroons and South West Africa to be under its protection; and France occupied Guinea. French West Africa was founded in 1895 and French Equatorial Africa in 1910. In French Somaliland, a short-lived Russian colony in the Egyptian fort of Sagallo was briefly proclaimed by Terek Cossacks in 1889.

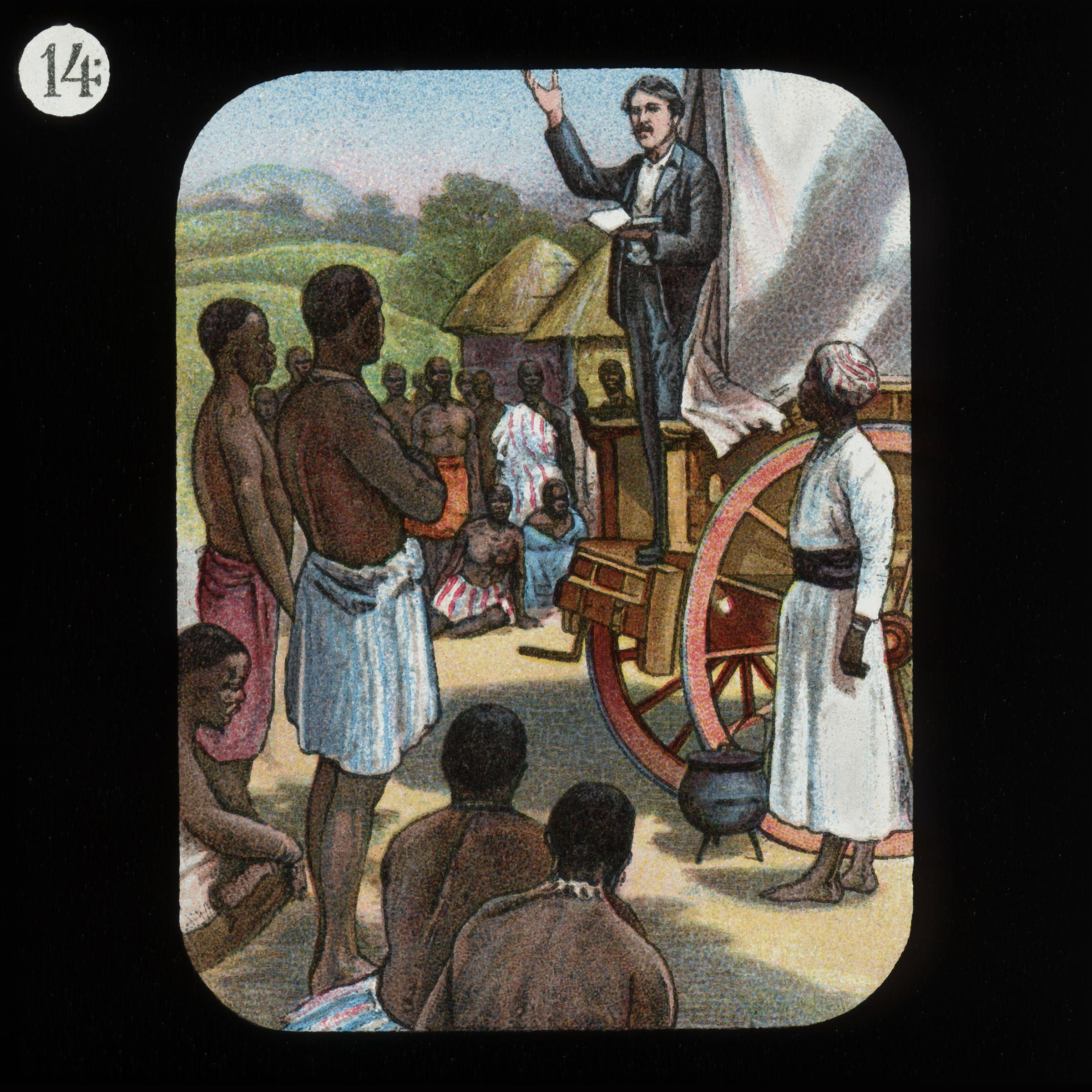
David Livingstone, early explorer of the interior of Africa and fighter against the slave trade

==== Germany's Weltpolitik (World Policy) ====
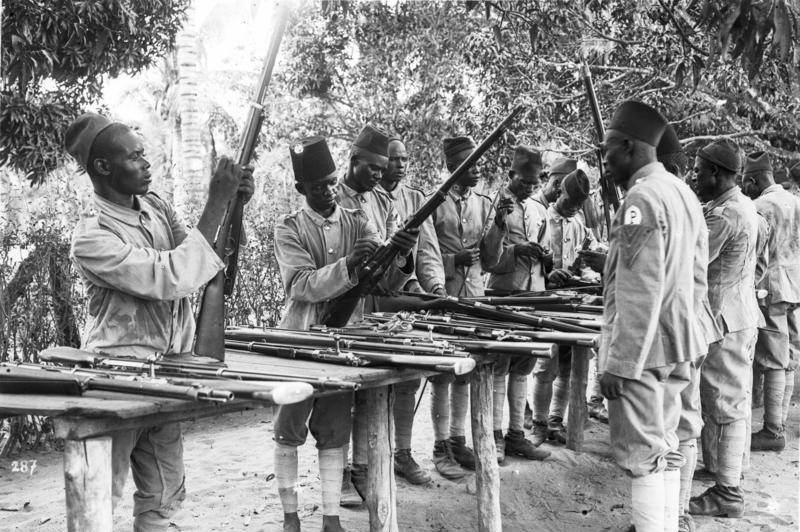
The Askari colonial troops in German East Africa, c. 1906

Germany, divided into small states, was not initially a colonial power. In 1862, Otto von Bismarck became Minister-President of the Kingdom of Prussia, and through a series of wars with both Austria in 1866 and France in 1870 was able to unify all of Germany under Prussian rule. The German Empire was formally proclaimed on 18 January 1871. At first, Bismarck disliked colonies but gave in to popular and elite pressure in the 1880s. He sponsored the 1884–85 Berlin Conference, which set the rules of effective control of African territories and reduced the risk of conflict between colonial powers. Bismarck used private companies to set up small colonial operations in Africa and the Pacific.

Pan-Germanism became linked to the young nation's new imperialist drives. In the beginning of the 1880s, the Deutscher Kolonialverein was created, and published the Kolonialzeitung. This colonial lobby was also relayed by the nationalist Alldeutscher Verband. Weltpolitik (world policy) was the foreign policy adopted by Kaiser Wilhelm II in 1890, intending to transform Germany into a global power through aggressive diplomacy, and the development of a large navy. Germany became the third-largest colonial power in Africa, the location of most of its 2.6 million square kilometres of colonial territory and 14 million colonial subjects in 1914. The African possessions were Southwest Africa, Togoland, the Cameroons, and Tanganyika. Germany tried to isolate France in 1905 with the First Moroccan Crisis. This led to the 1905 Algeciras Conference, in which France's influence on Morocco was compensated by the exchange of other territories, and then to the Agadir Crisis in 1911.

==== Italy's expansion ====
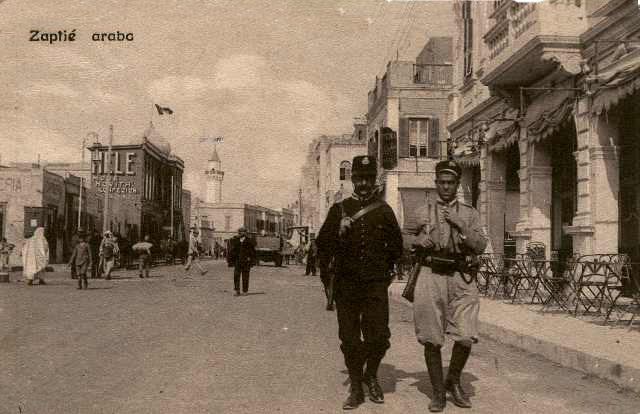
An Italian Carabiniere and a Libyan colonial Zaptié patrolling in Tripoli, Italian Tripolitania, 1914

After fighting alongside France during the Crimean War (1853–1856), the Kingdom of Sardinia sought to unify the Italian peninsula, with French support. Following a war with Austria in 1859, Sardinia, under the leadership of Victor Emmanuel II and Giuseppe Garibaldi, was able to unify most of the peninsula by 1861, establishing the Kingdom of Italy.

Following unification, Italy sought to expand its territory and become a great power, taking possession of parts of Eritrea in 1870 and 1882. In 1889–1890, it occupied territory on the south side of the Horn of Africa, forming what would become Italian Somaliland. In the disorder that followed the 1889 death of Emperor Yohannes IV, General Oreste Baratieri occupied the Ethiopian Highlands along the Eritrean coast, and Italy proclaimed the establishment of a new colony of Eritrea, with its capital moved from Massawa to Asmara. When relations between Italy and Ethiopia deteriorated, the First Italo-Ethiopian War broke out in 1895; Italian troops were defeated as the Ethiopians had numerical superiority, better organization, and support from Russia and France. In 1911, Italy engaged in a war with the Ottoman Empire, in which it acquired Tripolitania and Cyrenaica, that together formed what became known as Italian Libya. In 1919 Enrico Corradini developed the concept of Proletarian Nationalism, which was supposed to legitimise Italy's imperialism by a mixture of socialism with nationalism:

We must start by recognizing the fact that there are proletarian nations as well as proletarian classes; that is to say, there are nations whose living conditions are subject...to the way of life of other nations, just as classes are. Once this is realised, nationalism must insist firmly on this truth: Italy is, materially and morally, a proletarian nation.

The Second Italo-Abyssinian War (1935–1936), ordered by the fascist dictator Benito Mussolini, was the last colonial war (that is, intended to colonise a country, as opposed to wars of national liberation), occupying Ethiopia—which had remained the last independent African territory, apart from Liberia. Italian Ethiopia was occupied by fascist Italian forces in World War II as part of Italian East Africa though much of the mountainous countryside had remained out of Italian control due to resistance from the Arbegnoch. The occupation is an example of the expansionist policy that characterized the Axis powers as opposed to the Scramble for Africa.

==== Portugal's Pink Map plan ====
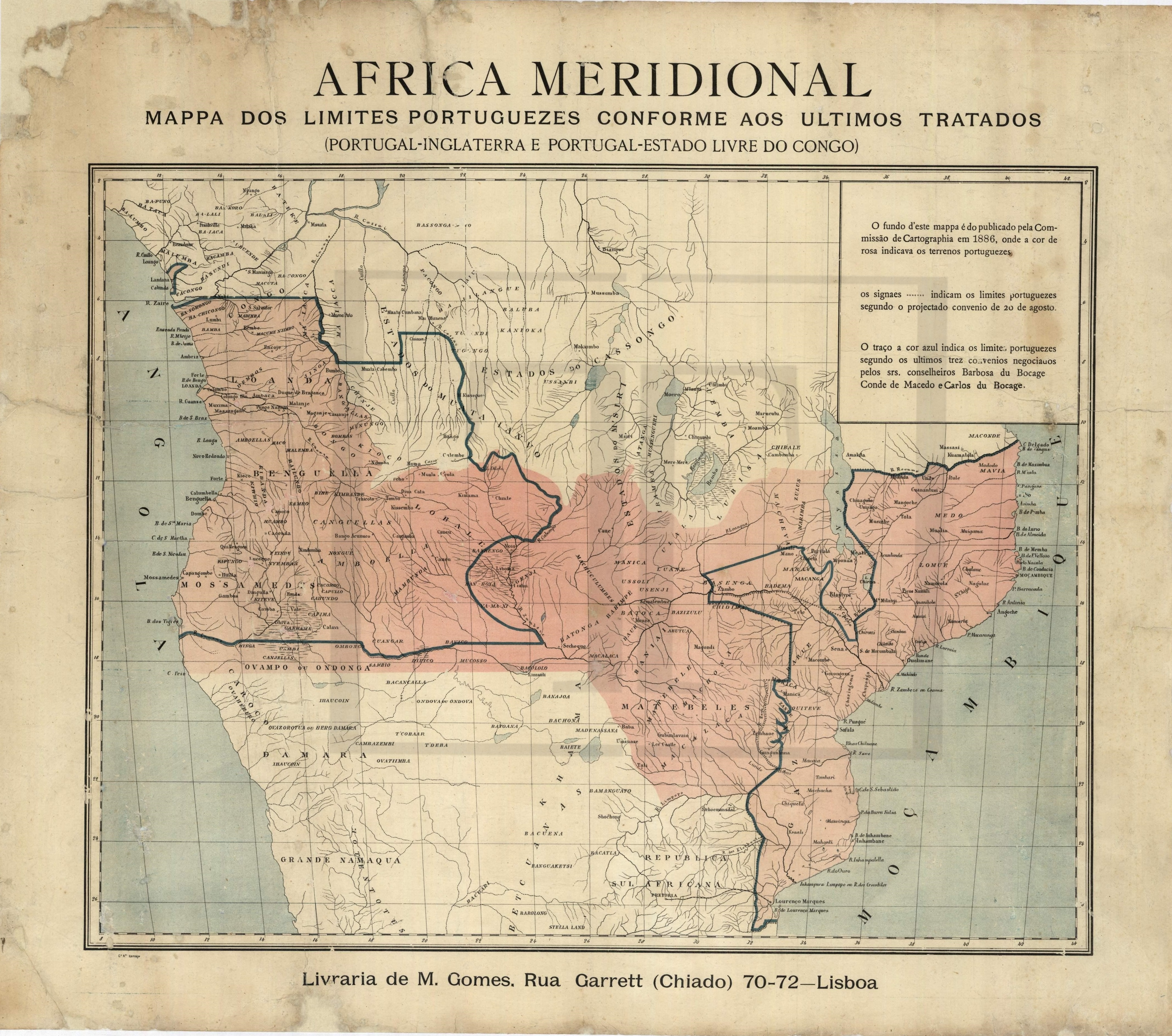
Portuguese claims in southern Africa as depicted in the Pink Map.

Portugal had the oldest official presence in Africa out of all the European powers. The Portuguese were officially involved in African affairs as early as 1415, when King John I captured the Moroccan city of Ceuta. Owing to the initiative of Prince Henry the Navigator, the Portuguese pushed south along the west African coast, discovered the Cape Verde archipelago, which was uninhabited, and reached Guinea, where commercial treaties were signed with local rulers to exchange manufactured European commodities such as cloth for gold, ivory and slaves. Cape Verde was settled during the reign of Afonso V. During the reign of John II, the Portuguese built the fortress of Elmina in West Africa, settled São Tomé and Príncipe, and established contacts with the Kingdom of Kongo in 1483, while Bartolomeu Dias rounded the Cape of Good Hope. Vasco da Gama would first explore the region that now corresponds to Mozambique when he discovered the sea route to India.

Portugal's African possessions were for several centuries based on fortified trading centers near the coast, with the exception of settlements that penetrated into the interior along the Zambezi River. Coastal fortresses at Sofala in 1505 and another at Mozambique Island in 1507 marked the beginning of Portuguese Mozambique, while on the opposite side of the continent, Luanda, which became the center of Portuguese Angola, was founded in 1576. After the Battle of Pungo Andongo in 1671, the Kingdom of Ndongo was fully annexed into Portuguese Angola. Ndongo was the first African state to be annexed by Europeans. Throughout the 16th century, independent Portuguese traders and adventurers infiltrated the interior of the Zambezi River basin by following the river and its tributaries, and in the 1570s Portugal established forts at Sena and Tete several hundred kilometres up the navigable section of the Zambezi. Around the Zambezi River, Portugal established the prazo system of estate-holders, whereby prazeiros were awarded a lease over a parcel of land to administer in exchange for maintaining a contingent of troops and enforcing Crown rule. The prazo system was unstable and declined from the 17th century. For a brief period in the 18th century, Zumbo was the largest of the Portuguese towns along the Zambezi, though it was isolated at the end of a long line of communication.

After the Independence of Brazil in 1822, Portugal sought to protect, develop and expand its remaining overseas territories in order to compensate for the loss of Brazilian trade and revenue and its international standing, leading to an aggressive expansion of its Angolan and Mozambican territories. Portugal’s greatest challenges throughout the 19th century would prove to be the scarcity of means and foreign encroachment. Between 1861 and 1875, the United Kingdom contested Portuguese claims over Maputo Bay, considered the "Key to South Africa", though the president of France Patrice de MacMahon ruled in favour of Portugal in international arbitration. The Lisbon Geographical Society meanwhile promoted the "Pink Map", which called for the occupation of all territory between Angola and Mozambique, though this clashed with British claims, particularly Cecil Rhodes Cape to Cairo Railway plan. Portugal’s dispute with King Leopold II of Belgium over the control of the Congo estuary in particular motivated German chancellor Otto von Bismark to call the Berlin Conference in 1884, though Bismark aimed to solve European disputes along the Congo and elsewhere in Africa. Portugal saw its claims to the west bank of the Congo confirmed, though any and all claims based on simple discovery and just diplomatic or commercial relations with the native powers were rejected.

== History and characteristics ==
=== Colonization before World War I ===
==== Congo ====
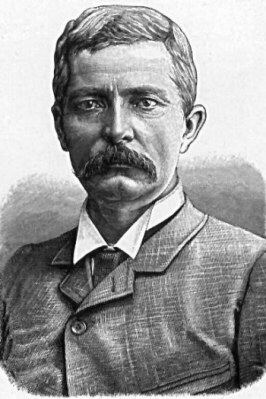
Henry Morton Stanley

David Livingstone's explorations, carried on by Henry Morton Stanley, excited imaginations with Stanley's grandiose ideas for colonisation; but these found little support owing to the problems and scale of action required, except from Leopold II of Belgium, who in 1876 had organised the International African Association. From 1869 to 1874, Stanley was secretly sent by Leopold II to the Congo region, where he made treaties with several African chiefs along the Congo River and by 1882 had sufficient territory to form the basis of the Congo Free State.

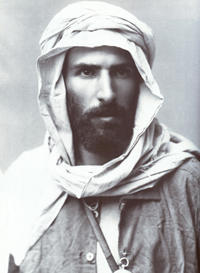
Pierre Savorgnan de Brazza in his version of the "native" dress, photographed by Félix Nadar

While Stanley was exploring the Congo on behalf of Leopold II of Belgium, the Franco-Italian marine officer Pierre de Brazza travelled into the western Congo Basin and raised the French flag over the newly founded Brazzaville in 1881, thus occupying today's Republic of the Congo. Portugal, which also claimed the area because of old treaties with the Kingdom of Kongo, made a treaty with Britain on 26 February 1884 to block off Leopold's access to the Atlantic.

By 1890, the Congo Free State had consolidated control of its territory between Leopoldville and Stanleyville and was looking to push south down the Lualaba River from Stanleyville. At the same time, the British South Africa Company of Cecil Rhodes was expanding north from the Limpopo River, sending the Pioneer Column (guided by Frederick Selous) through Matabeleland, and starting a colony in Mashonaland.

Tippu Tip, a Zanzibari Arab based in the Sultanate of Zanzibar, also played a major role as a "protector of European explorers", ivory trader and slave trader. Having established a trading empire within Zanzibar and neighbouring areas in East Africa, Tippu Tip would shift his alignment towards the rising colonial powers in the region and at the proposal of Henry Morton Stanley, Tippu Tip became a governor of the "Stanley Falls District" (Boyoma Falls) in Leopold's Congo Free State, before being involved in the Congo Arab war against Leopold II's colonial state.

To the west, in the land where their expansions would meet, was Katanga, the site of the Yeke Kingdom of Msiri. Msiri was the most militarily powerful ruler in the area and traded large quantities of copper, ivory and slaves—and rumours of gold reached European ears. The scramble for Katanga was a prime example of the period. Rhodes sent two expeditions to Msiri in 1890 led by Alfred Sharpe, who was rebuffed, and Joseph Thomson, who failed to reach Katanga. Leopold sent four expeditions. First, the Le Marinel expedition could only extract a vaguely worded letter. The Delcommune expedition was rebuffed. The well-armed Stairs expedition was given orders to take Katanga with or without Msiri's consent. Msiri refused, was shot, and his head was cut off and stuck on a pole as a "barbaric lesson" to the people. The Bia River expedition finished the job of establishing an administration of sorts and a "police presence" in Katanga. Thus, the half million square kilometres of Katanga came into Leopold's possession and brought his African realm up to 2,300,000 square kilometres (890,000 sq mi), about 75 times larger than Belgium. The Congo Free State imposed such a terror regime on the colonized people, including mass killings and forced labour, that Belgium, under pressure from the Congo Reform Association, ended Leopold II's rule and annexed it on 20 August 1908 as a colony of Belgium, known as the Belgian Congo.

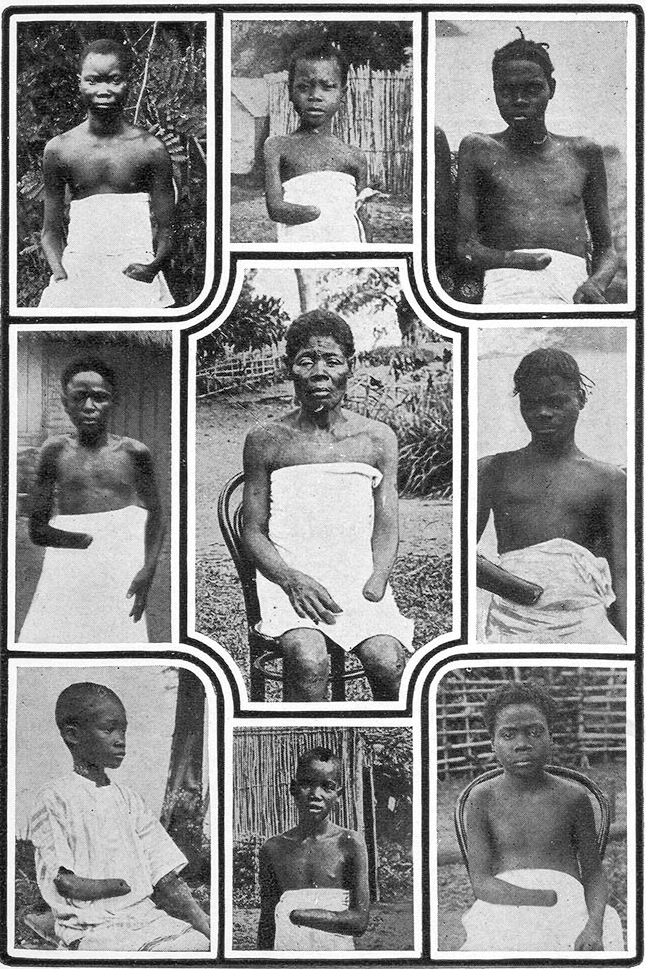
From 1885 to 1908, many atrocities were perpetrated in the Congo Free State; in these images, Native Congo Free State labourers who failed to meet rubber collection quotas have been punished by having their hands cut off.

The brutality of King Leopold II in his former colony of the Congo Free State was well documented; up to 8 million of the estimated 16 million native inhabitants died between 1885 and 1908. According to Roger Casement, an Irish diplomat of the time, this depopulation had four main causes: "indiscriminate war", starvation, reduction of births and diseases. Sleeping sickness ravaged the country and must also be taken into account for the dramatic decrease in population; it has been estimated that sleeping sickness and smallpox killed nearly half the population in the areas surrounding the lower Congo River. Estimates of the death toll vary considerably. As the first census did not take place until 1924, it is difficult to quantify the population loss of the period. The Casement Report set it at three million. William Rubinstein writes: "More basically, it appears almost certain that the population figures given by Hochschild are inaccurate. There is, of course, no way of ascertaining the population of the Congo before the 20th century, and estimates like 20 million are purely guesses. Most of the interior of the Congo was literally unexplored if not inaccessible."

A similar situation occurred in the neighbouring French Congo, where most of the resource extraction was run by concession companies, whose brutal methods, along with the introduction of disease, resulted in the loss of up to 50% of the indigenous population according to Hochschild. The French government appointed a commission headed by de Brazza in 1905 to investigate the rumoured abuses in the colony. However, de Brazza died on the return trip, and his "searingly critical" report was neither acted upon nor released to the public. In the 1920s, about 20,000 forced labourers died building a railroad through the French territory.

==== Egypt, Sudan, and South Sudan ====
===== Suez Canal =====
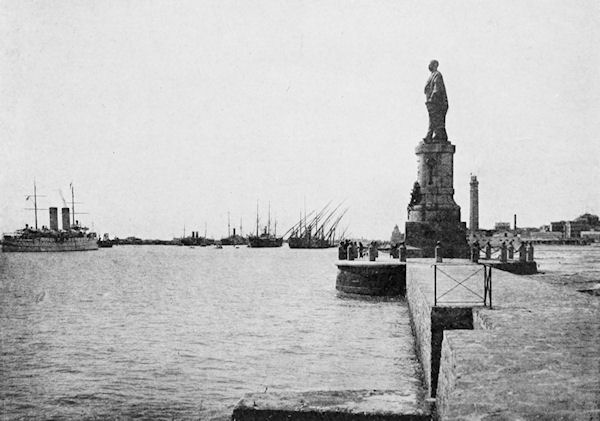
Port Said entrance to Suez Canal, showing De Lesseps' statue

To construct the Suez Canal, French diplomat Ferdinand de Lesseps had obtained many concessions from Isma'il Pasha, the Khedive of Egypt and Sudan in 1854–56. Some sources estimate the workforce at 30,000, but others estimate that 120,000 workers died over the ten years of construction from malnutrition, fatigue, and disease, especially cholera. Shortly before its completion in 1869, Khedive Isma'il borrowed enormous sums from British and French bankers at high rates of interest. By 1875, he was facing financial difficulties and was forced to sell his block of shares in the Suez Canal. The shares were snapped up by Britain, under Prime Minister Benjamin Disraeli, who sought to give his country practical control in the management of this strategic waterway. When Isma'il repudiated Egypt's foreign debt in 1879, Britain and France seized joint financial control over the country, forcing the Egyptian ruler to abdicate and installing his eldest son Tewfik Pasha in his place. The Egyptian and Sudanese ruling classes did not relish foreign intervention.

===== Mahdist War =====
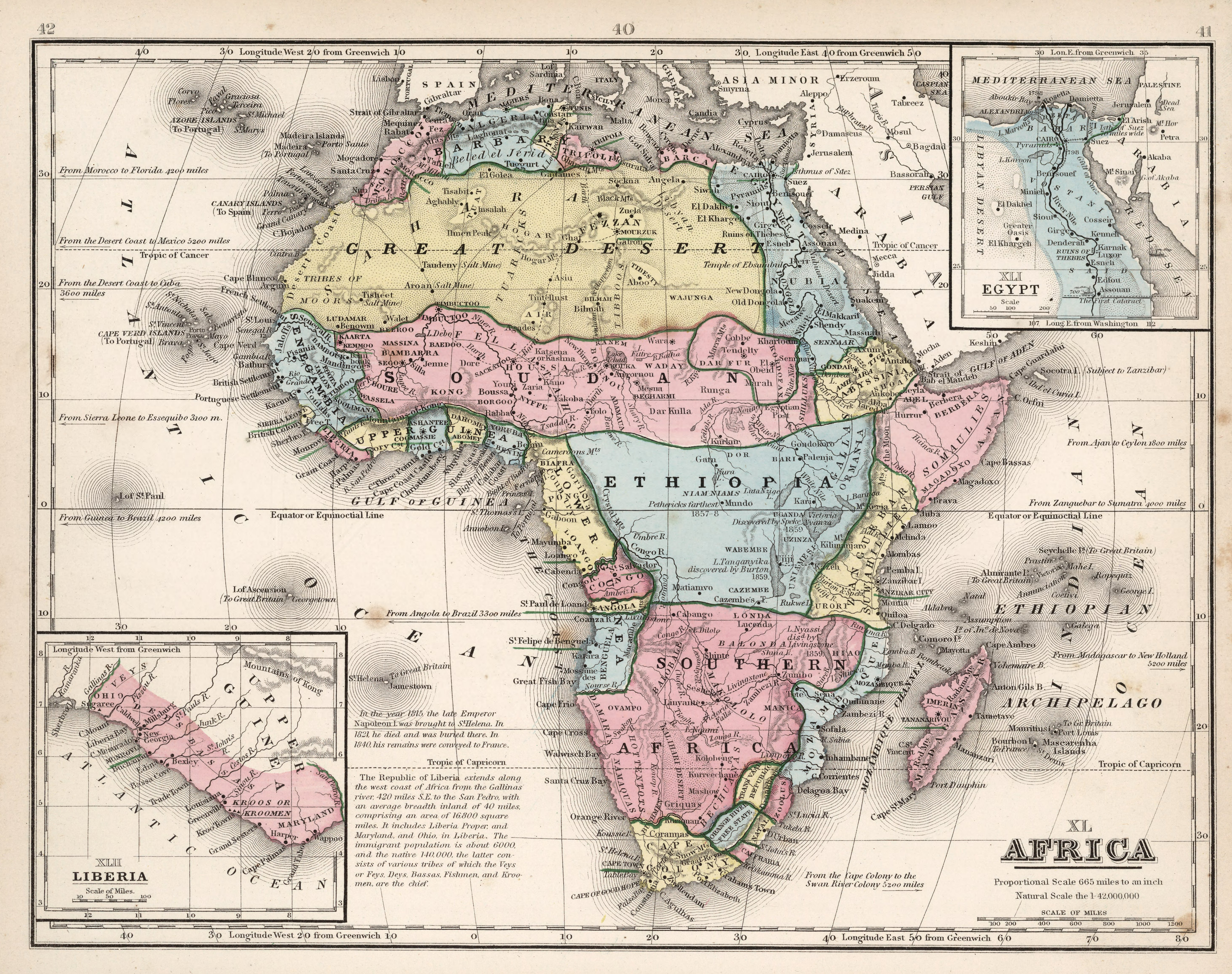
Africa in 1865, prior to the Berlin Conference (1884–1885).

During the 1870s, European initiatives against the slave trade caused an economic crisis in Northern Sudan, precipitating the rise of Mahdist forces. In 1881, the Mahdist revolt erupted in Sudan under Muhammad Ahmad, severing Tewfik's authority in Sudan. The same year, Tewfik suffered an even more perilous rebellion by his Egyptian army in the form of the Urabi revolt. In 1882, Tewfik appealed for direct British military assistance, commencing Britain's administration of Egypt. A joint British-Egyptian military force entered the Mahdist War. Additionally the Egyptian province of Equatoria (located in South Sudan) led by Emin Pasha was also subject to an ostensible relief expedition of Emin Pasha against Mahdist forces. The British-Egyptian force ultimately defeated the Mahdist forces in Sudan in 1898. Thereafter, Britain seized effective control of Sudan, which was nominally called Anglo-Egyptian Sudan.

==== Berlin Conference (1884–1885) ====
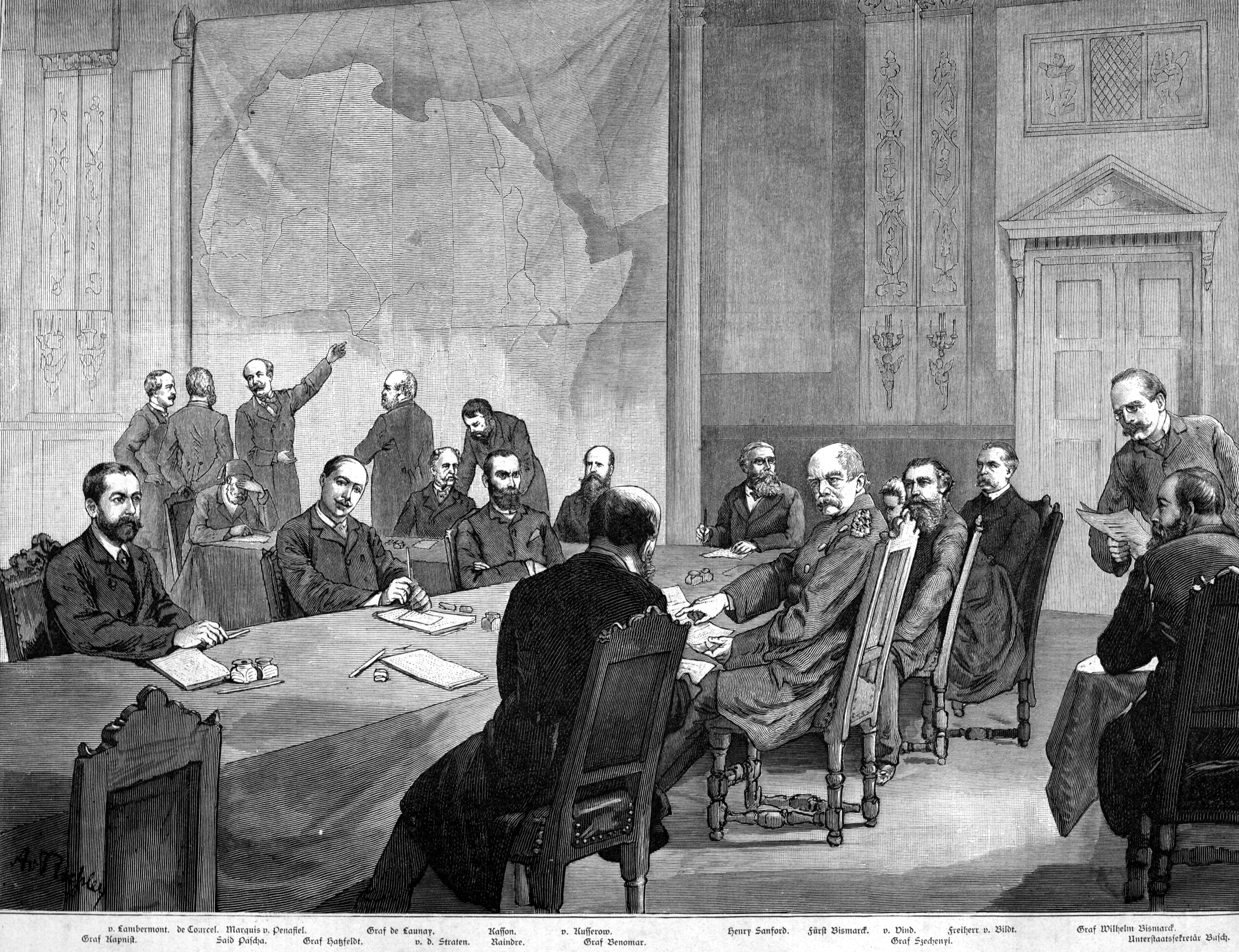
Otto von Bismarck at the Berlin Conference, 1884

The occupation of Egypt and the acquisition of the Congo were the first major moves in what came to be a precipitous scramble for African territory. In 1884, Otto von Bismarck convened the 1884–1885 Berlin Conference to discuss the African problem. While diplomatic discussions were held regarding ending the remaining slave trade as well as the reach of missionary activities, the primary concern of those in attendance was preventing war between the European powers as they divided the continent among themselves. More importantly, the diplomats in Berlin laid down the rules of competition by which the great powers were to be guided in seeking colonies. They also agreed that the area along the Congo River was to be administered by Leopold II as a neutral area in which trade and navigation were to be free. The Berlin Conference transformed Africa's colonization from informal economic penetration to systematic political control through its 'effective occupation' principle. No nation was to stake claims in Africa without notifying other powers of its intentions. No territory could be formally claimed before being effectively occupied. However, the competitors ignored the rules when convenient, and on several occasions war was only narrowly avoided (see Fashoda Incident). The Swahili coast territories of the Sultanate of Zanzibar were partitioned between Germany and Britain, initially leaving the archipelago of Zanzibar independent until 1890, when that remnant of the Sultanate was made into a British protectorate with the Heligoland–Zanzibar Treaty.

==== Britain's administration of Egypt and South Africa ====
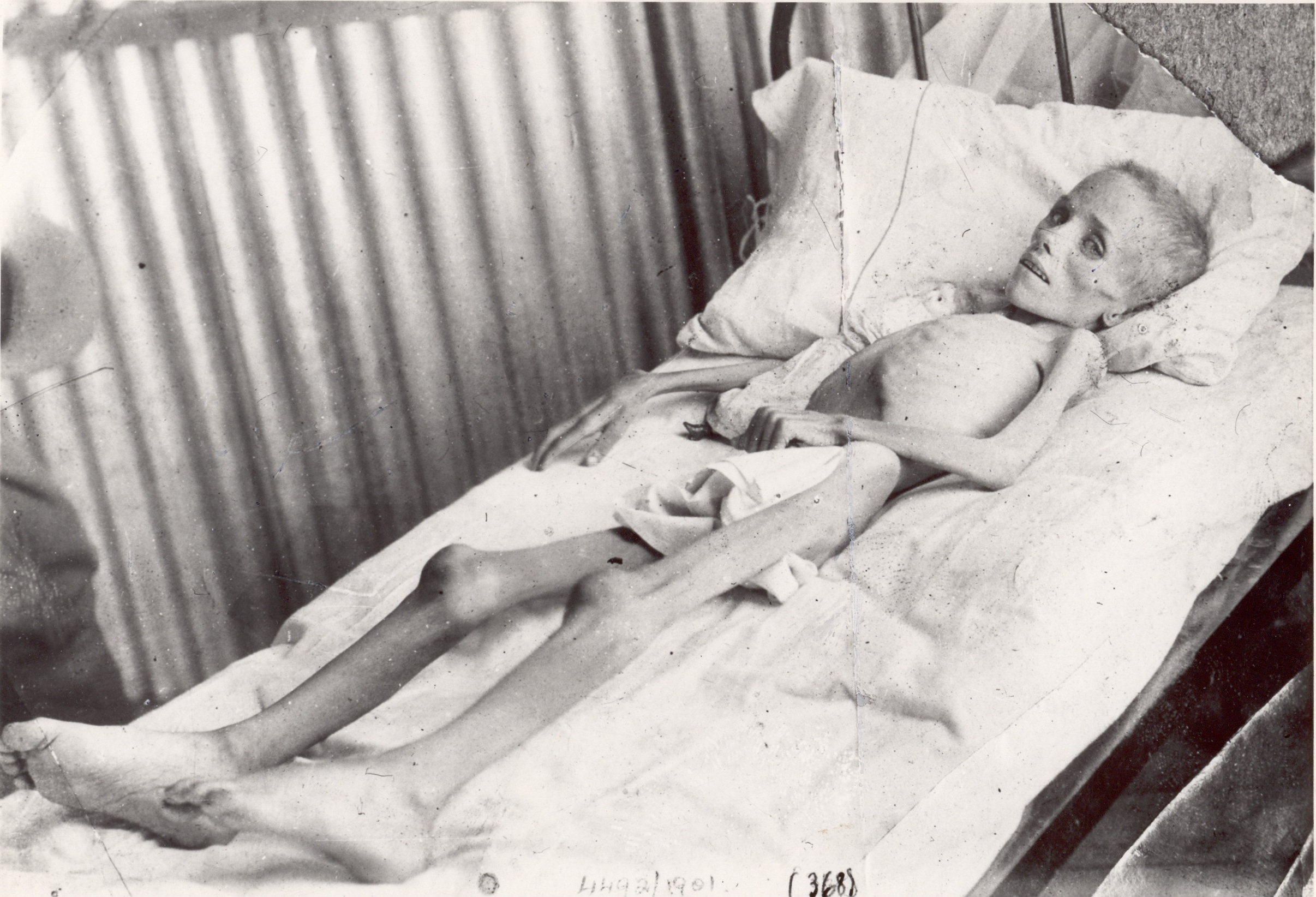
Boer child in a British concentration camp during the Second Boer War (1899–1902)

Britain's administration of Egypt and the Cape Colony contributed to a preoccupation over securing the source of the Nile river. Egypt was taken over by the British in 1882, leaving the Ottoman Empire in a nominal role until 1914, when London made it a protectorate. Egypt was never an actual British colony. Sudan, Nigeria, Kenya, and Uganda were subjugated in the 1890s and early 20th century; and in the south, the Cape Colony (first acquired in 1795) provided a base for the subjugation of neighbouring African states and the Dutch Afrikaner settlers who had left the Cape to avoid the British and then founded their republics. Theophilus Shepstone annexed the South African Republic in 1877 for the British Empire, after it had been independent for 20 years. In 1879, after the Anglo-Zulu War, Britain consolidated its control of most of the territories of South Africa. The Boers protested, and in December 1880 they revolted, leading to the First Boer War. British Prime Minister William Gladstone signed a peace treaty on 23 March 1881, giving self-government to the Boers in the Transvaal. The Jameson Raid of 1895 was a failed attempt by the British South Africa Company and the Johannesburg Reform Committee to overthrow the Boer government in the Transvaal. The Second Boer War, fought between 1899 and 1902, was about control of the gold and diamond industries; the independent Boer republics of the Orange Free State and the South African Republic were this time defeated and absorbed into the British Empire.

The French thrust into the African interior was mainly from the coasts of West Africa (present-day Senegal) eastward, through the Sahel along the southern border of the Sahara. Their ultimate aim was to have an uninterrupted colonial empire from the Niger River to the Nile, thus controlling all trade to and from the Sahel region by their existing control over the caravan routes through the Sahara. The British, on the other hand, wanted to link their possessions in Southern Africa with their territories in East Africa and these two areas with the Nile basin.

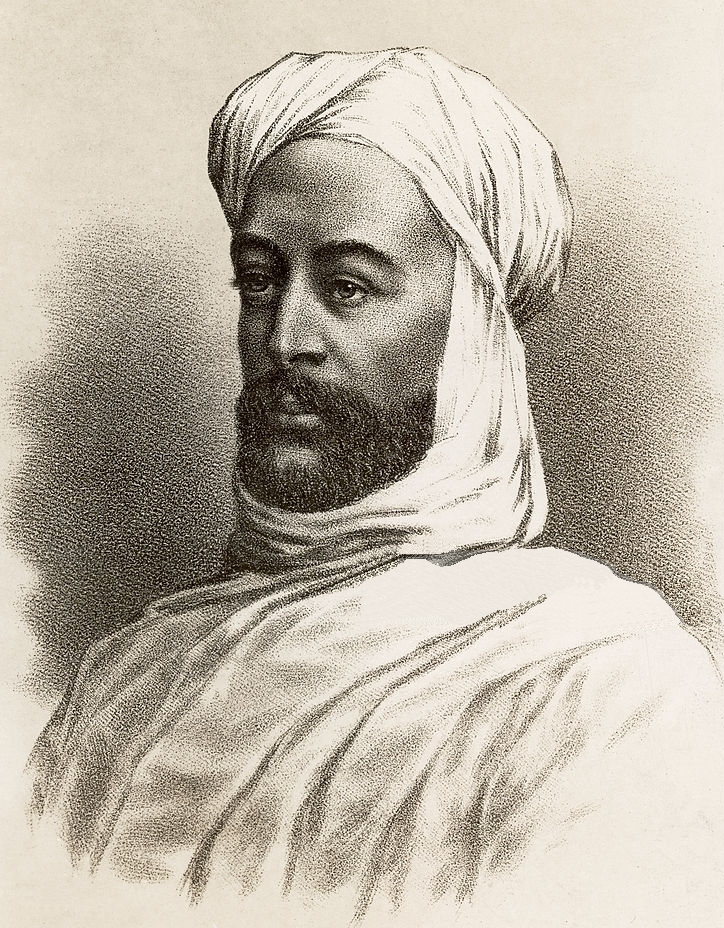
Muhammad Ahmad, leader of the Mahdists. This fundamentalist group of Muslim dervishes overran much of Sudan and fought British forces.

The Sudan (which included most of present-day Uganda) was the key to the fulfilment of these ambitions, especially since Egypt was already under British control. This "red line" through Africa is made most famous by Cecil Rhodes. Along with Lord Milner, the British colonial minister in South Africa, Rhodes advocated such a "Cape to Cairo" empire, linking the Suez Canal to the mineral-rich South Africa by rail. Though hampered by the German occupation of Tanganyika until the end of World War I, Rhodes successfully lobbied on behalf of such a sprawling African empire.

Britain had sought to extend its East African empire contiguously from Cairo to the Cape of Good Hope, while France had sought to extend its holdings from Dakar to the Sudan, which would enable its empire to span the entire continent from the Atlantic Ocean to the Red Sea. If one draws a line from Cape Town to Cairo (Rhodes's dream), and one from Dakar to the Horn of Africa (the French ambition), these two lines intersect somewhere in eastern Sudan near Fashoda, explaining its strategic importance.

A French force under Jean-Baptiste Marchand arrived first at the strategically located fort at Fashoda, soon followed by a British force under Lord Kitchener, commander in chief of the British Army since 1892. The French withdrew after a standoff and continued to press claims to other posts in the region. The Fashoda Incident ultimately led to the signature of the Entente Cordiale of 1904, which guaranteed peace between the two.

==== Anglo-French Agreement ====
In 1890, both the United Kingdom and France were able to reach a diplomatic solution over a colonial dispute that would guarantee freedom of trade for the British Empire while allowing France to expand their influence in North Africa. In exchange for France recognizing Britain's protectorate over Zanzibar, the British Empire recognized France's claim to Madagascar as well as their sphere of influence in North Africa stretching down to the border region of Sokoto. However, finely demarcating this border was difficult to do without a large map.

==== Moroccan Crises ====
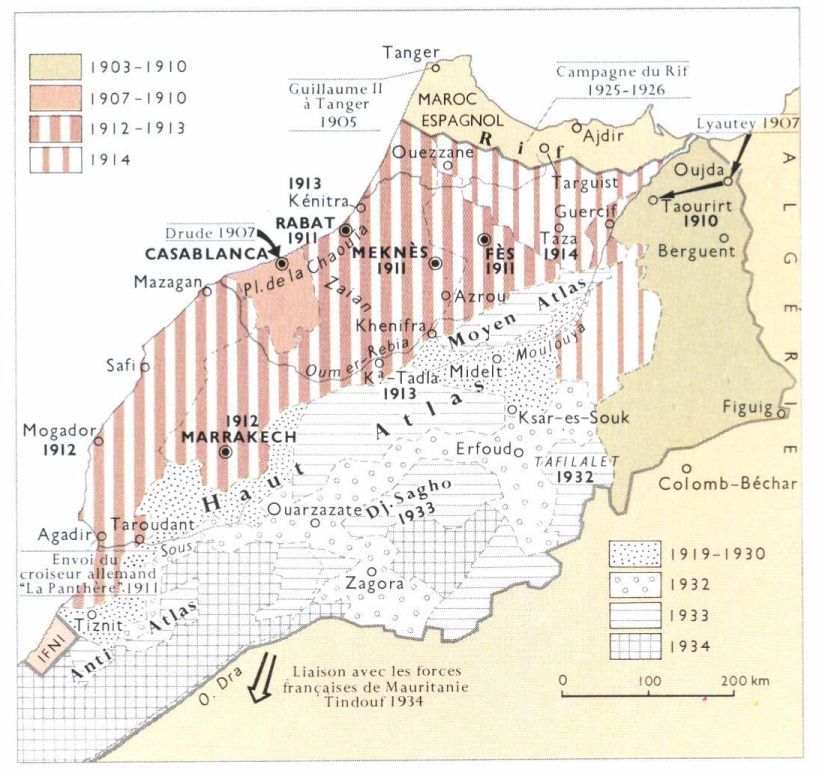
Map depicting the staged pacification of Morocco through to 1934

Although the Berlin Conference had set the rules for the Scramble for Africa, it had not weakened the rival imperialists. As a result of the Entente Cordiale, the German Kaiser decided to test the solidity of such influence, using the contested territory of Morocco as a battlefield. Kaiser Wilhelm II visited Tangier on 31 March 1905 and made a speech in favour of Moroccan independence, challenging French influence in Morocco. France's presence had been reaffirmed by Britain and Spain in 1904. The Kaiser's speech bolstered French nationalism, and with British support, the French foreign minister, Théophile Delcassé, took a defiant line. The crisis peaked in mid-June 1905 when Delcassé was forced out of the ministry by the more conciliation-minded premier Maurice Rouvier. But by July 1905 Germany was becoming isolated, and the French agreed to a conference to solve the crisis.

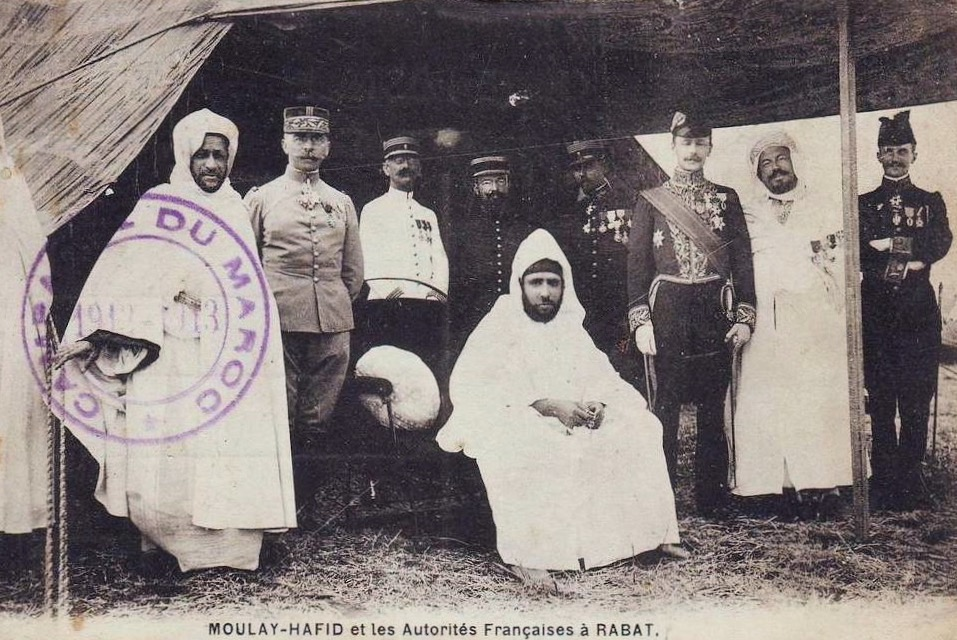
The Moroccan Sultan Abdelhafid, who led the resistance to French expansionism during the Agadir Crisis

The 1906 Algeciras Conference was called to settle the dispute. Of the thirteen nations present, the German representatives found their only supporter was Austria-Hungary, which had no interest in Africa. France had firm support from Britain, the U.S., Russia, Italy, and Spain. The Germans eventually accepted an agreement, signed on 31 May 1906, whereby France yielded certain domestic changes in Morocco but retained control of key areas.

However, five years later the Second Moroccan Crisis (or Agadir Crisis) was sparked by the deployment of the German gunboat Panther to the port of Agadir in July 1911. Germany had started to attempt to match Britain's naval supremacy—the British navy had a policy of remaining larger than the next two rival fleets in the world combined. When the British heard of the Panther's arrival in Morocco, they wrongly believed that the Germans meant to turn Agadir into a naval base on the Atlantic. The German move was aimed at reinforcing claims for compensation for acceptance of effective French control of the North African kingdom, where France's pre-eminence had been upheld by the 1906 Algeciras Conference. In November 1911, a compromise was reached under which Germany accepted France's position in Morocco in return for a slice of territory in the French Equatorial African colony of Middle Congo.

France and Spain subsequently established a full protectorate over Morocco on 30 March 1912, ending what remained of the country's formal independence. Furthermore, British backing for France during the two Moroccan crises reinforced the Entente between the two countries and added to Anglo-German estrangement, deepening the divisions that would culminate in the First World War.

==== Dervish resistance ====
The Dervish Movement (Somali: Dhaqdhaqaaqa Daraawiish) was an armed resistance movement between 1899 and 1920, which was led by the Muslim poet and militant leader Mohammed Abdullah Hassan, also known as Sayyid Mohamed, who called for independence from the British and Italian colonisers and for the defeat of Ethiopians. The Dervish movement attracted approximately 25,000 youth from different clans over 1899 and 1905, acquired firearms and then attacked the Ethiopian garrison at Jigjiga overrunning it. Giving them their first military victory. The Dervish movement then declared the colonial administration in British Somaliland as their enemy.

The British launched Punitive attacks against Dervish strongholds in 1904. The Dervish movement suffered losses in the field, regrouped into smaller units and resorted to guerrilla warfare.

In 1908, the Dervishes again entered British Somaliland and began inflicting major losses to the British in the interior regions of the Horn of Africa. From 1908 onwards until the end of the World War I The British retreated to the few remaining coastal regions after suffering heavy losses in the interior to which the dervish continued to operate independently and leaving the interior regions in the hands of the Dervishes. During 1905–1910, the Dervishes continued raids against the remaining British who were defeated in the battle of Dul Madooba.

The Dervish movement temporarily created a mobile independent Somali "proto-state" in early 20th-century with fluid boundaries and fluctuating population. It was one of the bloodiest and longest militant movements in sub-Saharan Africa during the colonial era, one that overlapped with World War I. The battles between various sides over two decades killed nearly a third of Somaliland's population and ravaged the local economy.

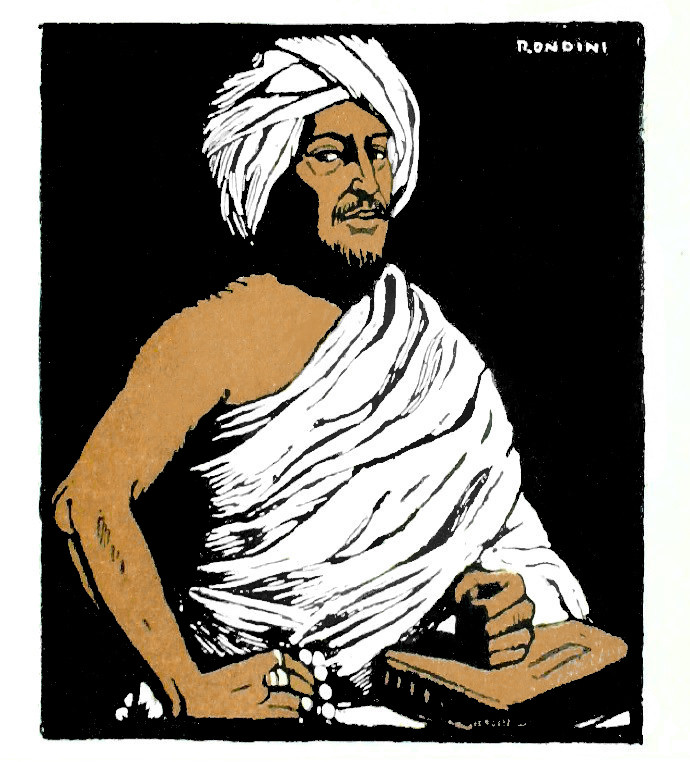
Portrait of Sayyid Mohammed Abdullah Hassan of the Dervish State

Following the Berlin Conference, the British, Italians, and Ethiopians sought to claim lands inhabited by the Somalis. The Dervish movement, led by Sayid Muhammed Abdullah Hassan, existed for 21 years, from 1899 until 1920. The Dervish movement successfully repulsed the British Empire four times and forced it to retreat to the coastal region. Because of these successful expeditions, the Dervish movement was recognized as an ally by the Ottoman and German empires. The Turks named Hassan Emir of the Somali nation, and the Germans promised to officially recognise any territories the Dervishes were to acquire.

After a quarter of a century of holding the British at bay and with the end of the World War I and the defeat of the Ottoman and German empires, the British turned their attention to the Dervishes. In 1920, the British launched a massive combined arms offensive on the Taleh forts, strongholds of the Dervish movement. the Dervishes were finally defeated in 1920 as a direct consequence of Britain's use of aircraft.

==== Herero Wars and the Maji Maji Rebellion ====
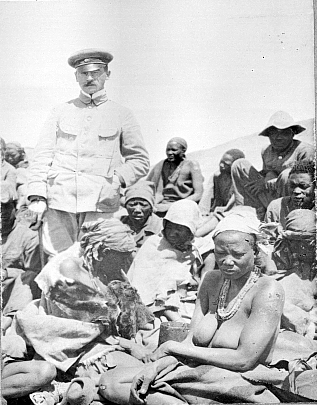
Lieutenant von Durling with prisoners at Shark Island, one of the German concentration camps used during the Herero and Nama genocide

Between 1904 and 1908, Germany's colonies in German South West Africa and German East Africa were rocked by separate, contemporaneous native revolts against their rule. In both territories the threat to German rule was quickly defeated once large-scale reinforcements from Germany arrived, with the Herero rebels in German South West Africa being defeated at the Battle of Waterberg and the Maji-Maji rebels in German East Africa being steadily crushed by German forces slowly advancing through the countryside, with the natives resorting to guerrilla warfare.

German efforts to clear the bush of civilians in German South West Africa resulted in a genocide of the population. In total, as many as 65,000 Herero (80% of the total Herero population), and 10,000 Nama (50% of the total Nama population) either starved, died of thirst, or were worked to death in camps such as Shark Island concentration camp between 1904 and 1908. Between 24,000 and 100,000 Hereros, 10,000 Nama, and an unknown number of San died in the genocide. Characteristic of this genocide was death from starvation, thirst, and possibly the poisoning of the population's wells, whilst they were trapped in the Namib Desert.

==== The Portuguese Campaigns of Pacification and Occupation ====
The Berlin Conference established the principle of "effective occupation" but national outrage at the 1890 British Ultimatum, a declining financial situation at home caused by worldwide recession and the rising tide of the "scramble" spurred Portugal towards territorial acquisition. The Portuguese beneffited from the most familiarity with the continent out of all the European powers, while the native polities were by the late 19th century wracked by long-standing internal issues and severely disunited, with many of its elites willing to cooperate in exchange for aid against their rivals and an advantageous position in the new order.

On the same year as the British Ultimatum, king Dunduma of Viye issued an ultimatum of his own and humiliated the renowned explorer Silva Porto, who committed suicide wrapped in the Portuguese flag on the occasion, but the clamor in the press caused the Portuguese government to have Viye annexed later that year by Artur de Paiva. Yet the most significant Portuguese actions would take place in Mozambique, where emperor Gungunhana conspired with Cecil Rhodes of the British South Africa Company to elude Portuguese claims to the region.

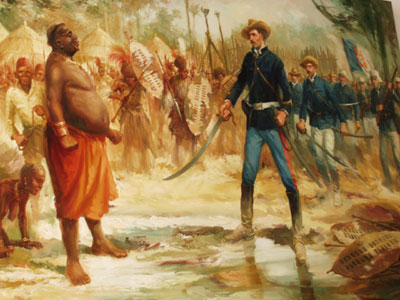
The capture of Gungunhana by Mouzinho de Albuquerque.

The conquest of the Gaza Empire was planned by Royal Commissioner António Enes, who enjoyed unanimous support from home, while the morale of the Portuguese expeditionary force was high, and Gaza was annexed in a fulminating action in spite of deficient logistics. João de Azevedo Coutinho followed by clearing the Zambezi river valley of bandits and sealed the pacification of the region with the Barue campaign in 1902, involving 1000 soldiers and 15,000 sipaios. The Sultanate of Angoche was a notorious slaving centre that resisted the ban on the slave trade, but it was annexed in 1910 by Pedro Massano de Amorim with the support of local Makua kings affected by slave raids. The last campaign in Mozambique was the Mueda campaign in 1917, carried out by 2100 Makua soldiers and Makonde guides, though the region would not be fully pacified until 1920. Portugal is estimated to have invested more than 7,000 European soldiers, 9,000 African soldiers, 74,000 sipaios and 100,000 allied native warriors in Mozambique between 1854 and World War I.

The occupation of Angola was carried out irregularly, in the north, the center, which was fully pacified by 1902, and towards the south, where Portuguese priority was to counteract German influence emanating from German South West Africa. Germany sought to encroach on the southern border of Angola and claim the whole Ovambo country. Paiva Couceiro laid out a plan to occupy the interior methodically, and though he served only briefly as interim governor-general between 1907 and 1909, his term is considered one of the most noteworthy in the history of Portuguese Angola. Boer refugees from the Anglo-Boer Wars would collaborate with the Portuguese Armed Forces as wagon drivers and mercenaries, though they hostilized both the Portuguese administration and the Africans just as often. The first major campaign beyond the Cunene River was launched in 1904 against the Cuamato, who raided Portuguese territory and allied tribes, though it ended in defeat at the Battle of the Cunene. The Cuamatos would be pacified in 1907. The Kingdom of Kongo was partitioned between Portugal and Belgium in 1913, and in 1915 general Pereira d'Eça led one of the last campaigns in Angola, to suppress the Ovambo Uprising.

Guinea proved to be the most challenging theater of operations as the region was fractured by numerous rivers and heavily forested, though also devastated by bitter conflict between a multitude of ethnicities for the capture of slaves and plunder. The borders of Guinea-Bissau were settled at the Franco-Portuguese Convention of 1886. About half of the territory was pacified in 1892, and by that point all Muslim kinglets acknowledged Portuguese sovereignty. João Teixeira Pinto was largely responsible for pacifying the remaining half of Guinea between 1912 and 1915, mostly owing to the support of chief Abdul Injai and the mass recruitment of Muslim auxiliaries. More regulars were invested in Guinea than in Mozambique, totalling 8,000, while the native auxiliaries numbered as many as 40,000, between 1879 and 1915.

The Portuguese campaigns in Africa resulted in the securing of over 2,000,000 square kms of territory and the creation of modern-day Angola, Mozambique and Guinea-Bissau, with an estimated population of 8 million by 1896. As many as 95% of the forces involved in these operations were African soldiers, sipaios and auxiliary warriors, which led some authors to comment that the new territories "conquered themselves".

== Philosophy ==
=== Colonial consciousness and exhibitions ===
==== Colonial lobby ====
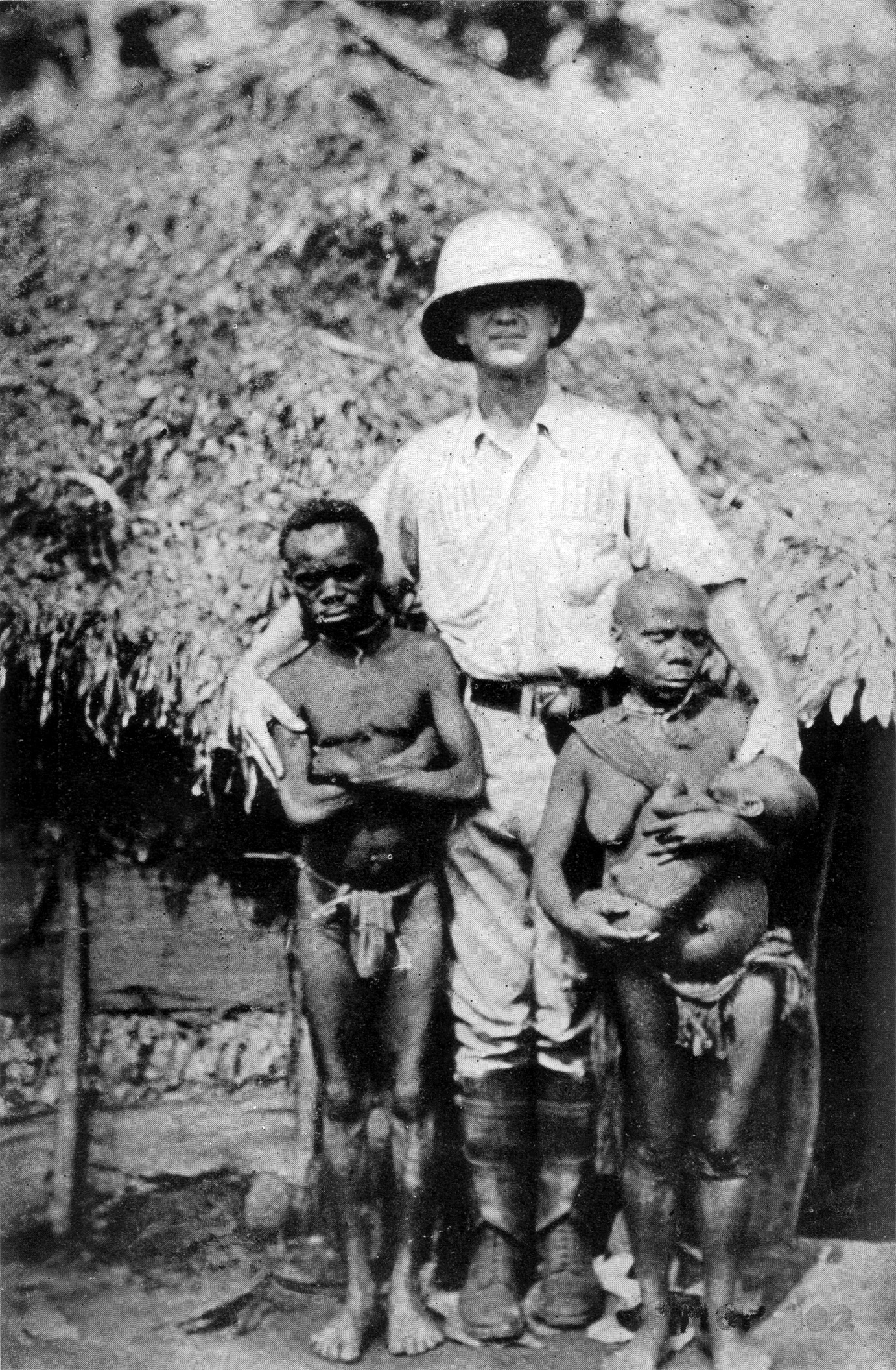
Pygmies and a European. Some pygmies would be exposed in human zoos, such as Ota Benga displayed by eugenicist Madison Grant in the Bronx Zoo.

In its earlier stages, imperialism was generally the act of individual explorers as well as some adventurous merchantmen. The colonial powers were a long way from approving without any dissent the expensive adventures carried out abroad. Various important political leaders, such as William Gladstone, opposed colonization in its first years. However, during his second premiership between 1880 and 1885, he could not resist the colonial lobby in his cabinet and thus did not execute his electoral promise to disengage from Egypt. Although Gladstone was personally opposed to imperialism, the social tensions caused by the Long Depression pushed him to favour jingoism: the imperialists had become the "parasites of patriotism." In France, Radical politician Georges Clemenceau was adamantly opposed to it: he thought colonization was a diversion from the "blue line of the Vosges" mountains, that is revanchism and the patriotic urge to reclaim the Alsace-Lorraine region which had been annexed by the German Empire with the 1871 Treaty of Frankfurt. Clemenceau made Jules Ferry's cabinet fall after the 1885 Tonkin disaster. According to Hannah Arendt in The Origins of Totalitarianism (1951), this expansion of national sovereignty on overseas territories contradicted the unity of the nation state which provided citizenship to its population. Thus, a tension between the universalist will respect human rights of the colonized people, as they may be considered as "citizens" of the nation-state, and the imperialist drive to cynically exploit populations deemed inferior began to surface. Some, in colonizing countries, opposed what they saw as unnecessary evils of the colonial administration when left to itself; as described in Joseph Conrad's Heart of Darkness (1899)—published around the same time as Kipling's The White Man's Burden—or in Louis-Ferdinand Céline's Journey to the End of the Night (1932).

Colonial lobbies emerged to legitimise the Scramble for Africa and other expensive overseas adventures. In Germany, France, and Britain, the middle class often sought strong overseas policies to ensure the market's growth. Even in lesser powers, voices like Enrico Corradini claimed a "place in the sun" for so-called "proletarian nations", bolstering nationalism and militarism in an early prototype of fascism.

==== Colonial propaganda and jingoism ====
A plethora of colonialist propaganda pamphlets, ideas, and imagery played on the colonial powers' psychology of popular jingoism and proud nationalism. A hallmark of the French colonial project in the late 19th century and early 20th century was the civilizing mission (mission civilisatrice), the principle that it was Europe's duty to bring civilisation to benighted peoples. As such, colonial officials undertook a policy of Franco-Europeanisation in French colonies, most notably French West Africa and Madagascar. During the 19th century, French citizenship along with the right to elect a deputy to the French Chamber of Deputies was granted to the four old colonies of Guadeloupe, Martinique, Guyane and Réunion as well as to the residents of the "Four Communes" in Senegal. In most cases, the elected deputies were white Frenchmen, although there were some black deputies, such as the Senegalese Blaise Diagne, who was elected in 1914.

==== Colonial exhibitions ====
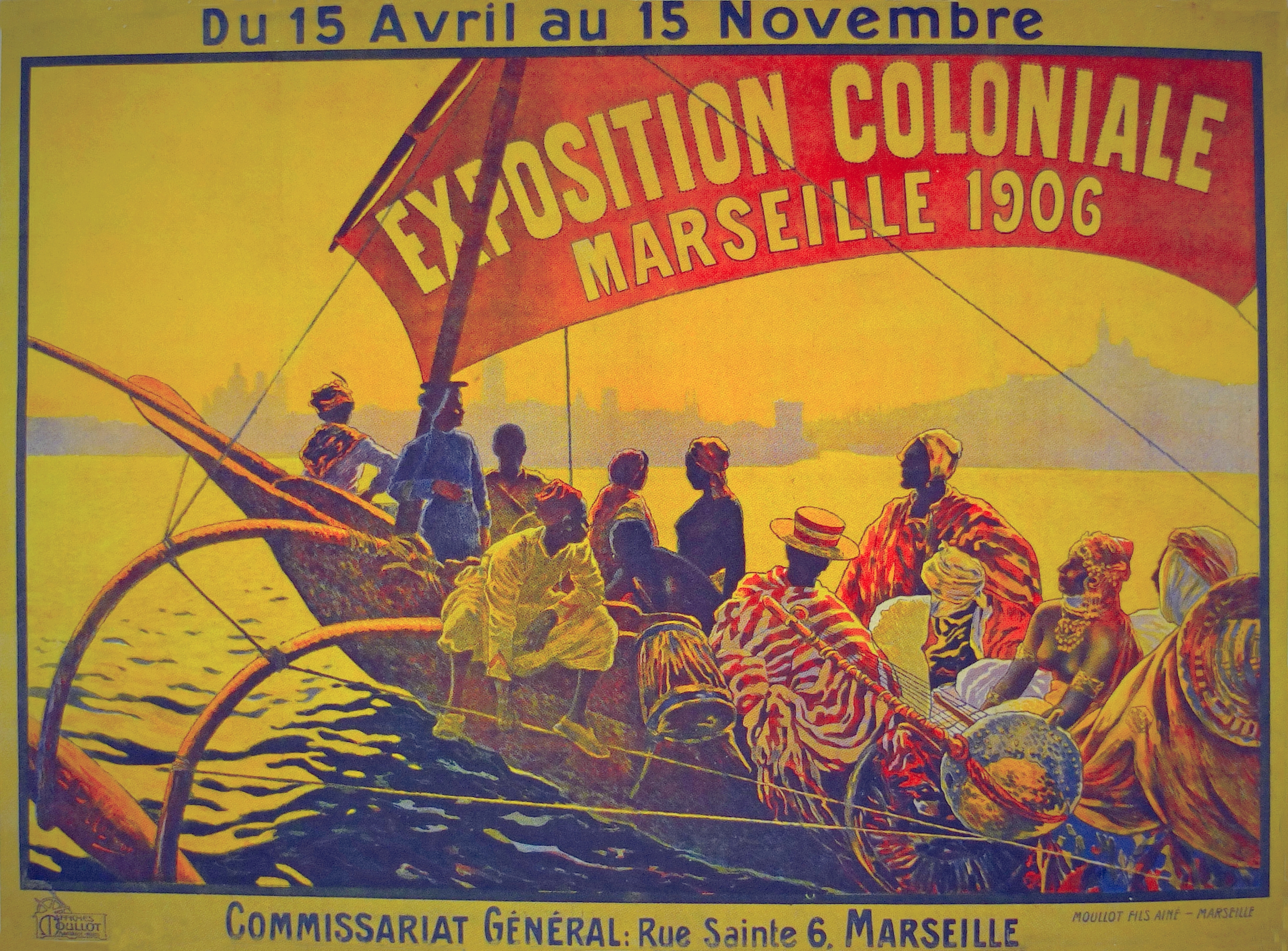
Poster for the 1906 Colonial Exhibition in Marseille (France)

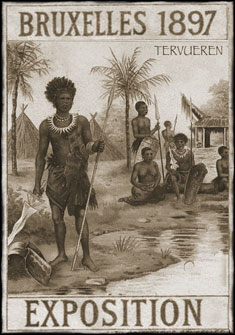
Poster for the 1897 Brussels International Exposition

By the end of World War I the colonial empires had become very popular almost everywhere in Europe: public opinion had been convinced of the needs of a colonial empire, although most of the metropolitans would never see a piece of it. Colonial exhibitions were instrumental in this change of popular mentalities brought about by the colonial propaganda, supported by the colonial lobby and by various scientists. Thus, conquests of territories were inevitably followed by public displays of the indigenous people for scientific and leisure purposes.

Carl Hagenbeck, a German merchant in wild animals and a future entrepreneur of most Europeans zoos, decided in 1874 to exhibit Samoa and Sami people as "purely natural" populations. In 1876, he sent one of his collaborators to the newly conquered Egyptian Sudan to bring back some wild beasts and Nubians. Presented in Paris, London, and Berlin these Nubians were very successful. Such "human zoos" could be found in Hamburg, Antwerp, Barcelona, London, Milan, New York City, Paris, etc., with 200,000 to 300,000 visitors attending each exhibition. Tuaregs were exhibited after the French conquest of Timbuktu (visited by René Caillié, disguised as a Muslim, in 1828, thereby winning the prize offered by the French Société de Géographie); Malagasy after the occupation of Madagascar; Amazons of Abomey after Behanzin's mediatic defeat against the French in 1894. Not used to the climatic conditions, some of the indigenous died from exposure, such as some Galibis in Paris in 1892.

Geoffroy de Saint-Hilaire, director of the Jardin d'Acclimatation, decided in 1877 to organise two "ethnological spectacles", presenting Nubians and Inuit. Ticket sales at the Jardin d'Acclimatation doubled, with a million paying entrances that year, a huge success for these times. Between 1877 and 1912, approximately thirty "ethnological exhibitions" were presented at the zoo. "Negro villages" were presented in Paris' 1878 World's Fair; the 1900 World's Fair presented the famous diorama "living" in Madagascar, while the Colonial Exhibitions in Marseille (1906 and 1922) and in Paris (1907 and 1931) displayed human beings in cages, often nudes or quasi-nudes. Nomadic "Senegalese villages" were also created, thus displaying the power of the colonial empire to all the population.

In the U.S., Madison Grant, head of the New York Zoological Society, exposed Pygmy Ota Benga in the Bronx Zoo alongside the apes and others in 1906. At the behest of Grant, a scientific racist and eugenicist, zoo director William Temple Hornaday placed Ota Benga in a cage with an orangutan and labeled him "The Missing Link" in an attempt to illustrate Darwinism, and in particular that Africans like Ota Benga are closer to apes than were Europeans. Other colonial exhibitions included the 1924 British Empire Exhibition and the 1931 Paris "Exposition coloniale".

=== Countering disease ===
From the beginning of the 20th century, the elimination or control of disease in tropical countries became a driving force for all colonial powers. The sleeping sickness epidemic in Africa was arrested through mobile teams systematically screening millions of people at risk. In the 1880s cattle brought from British Asia to feed Italian soldiers invading Eritrea turned out to be infected with a disease called rinderpest. Decimation of native herds severely damaged local livelihoods, forcing people to labor for their colonizers.

In the 20th century, Africa saw the biggest increase in its population because of lessening of the mortality rate in many countries through peace, famine relief, medicine, and above all, the end or decline of the slave trade. Africa's population has grown from 120 million in 1900 to over 1 billion today.

=== Abolition of slavery ===
The continuing anti-slavery movement in Western Europe became a reason and an excuse for the conquest and colonization of Africa. It was the central theme of the Brussels Anti-Slavery Conference 1889–90. From start of the Scramble for Africa, virtually all colonial regimes claimed to be motivated by a desire to suppress slavery and the slave trade. In French West Africa, following conquest and abolition by the French, over one million slaves fled from their masters to earlier homes between 1906 and 1911. In Madagascar, the French abolished slavery in 1896, and approximately 500,000 slaves were freed. Slavery was abolished in the French controlled Sahel by 1911. Independent nations attempting to westernize or impress Europe sometimes cultivated an image of slavery suppression. In response to European pressure, the Sokoto Caliphate abolished slavery in 1900, and Ethiopia officially abolished slavery in 1932. Colonial powers were mostly successful in abolishing slavery, though slavery remained active in Africa, even though it has gradually moved to a wage economy. Slavery was never fully eradicated in Africa.

== Aftermath ==
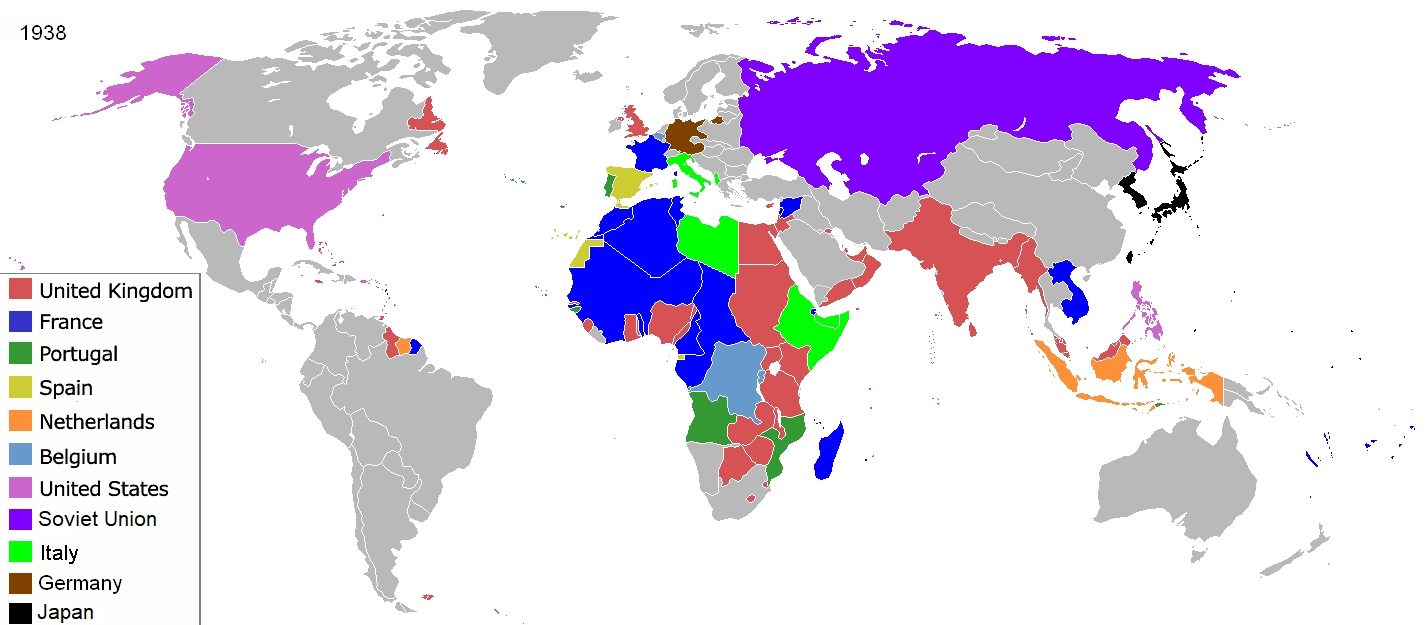
Colonial empires in 1938

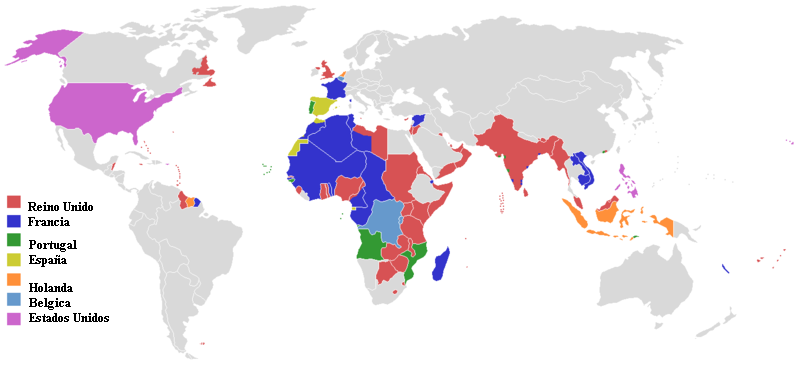
Colonial empires in 1945

During the New Imperialism period, by the end of the 19th century, Europe added almost 9,000,000 square miles (23,000,000 km^{2}) – one-fifth of the land area of the globe – to its overseas colonial possessions. Europe's formal holdings included the entire African continent except Ethiopia, Liberia, and Saguia el-Hamra, the latter of which was eventually integrated into Spanish Sahara. Between 1885 and 1914, Britain took nearly 30% of Africa's population under its control; 15% for France, 11% for Portugal, 9% for Germany, 7% for Belgium and 1% for Italy. Nigeria alone contributed 15 million subjects, more than in the whole of French West Africa or the entire German colonial empire. In terms of surface area occupied, the French were the marginal leaders, but much of their territory consisted of the sparsely populated Sahara.

Political imperialism followed the economic expansion, with the "colonial lobbies" bolstering chauvinism and jingoism at each crisis in order to legitimise the colonial enterprise. The tensions between the imperial powers led to a succession of crises, which exploded in August 1914, when previous rivalries and alliances created a domino situation that drew the major European nations into World War I.

=== African colonies listed by colonising power ===
==== Belgium ====
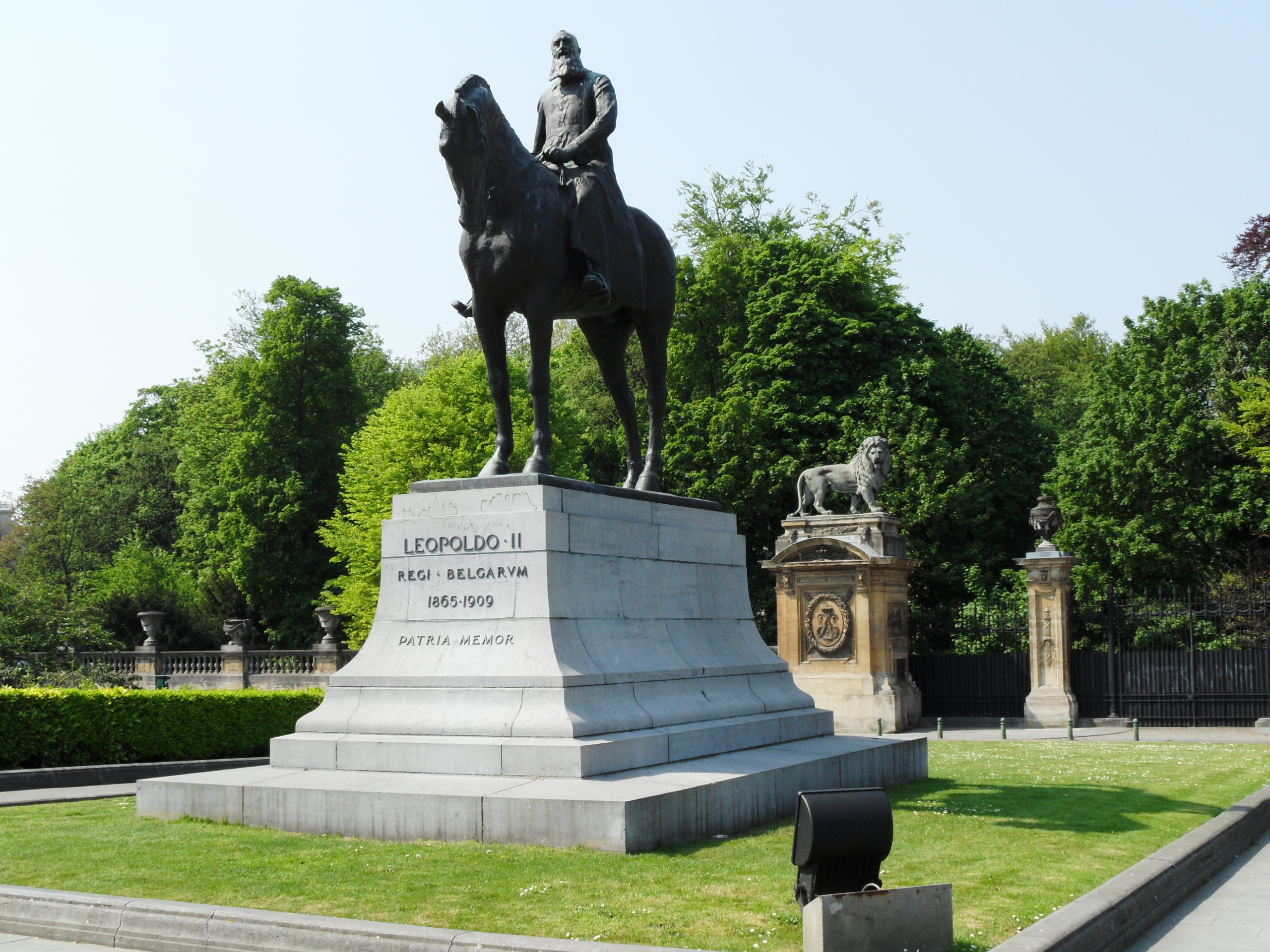
Equestrian statue of Leopold II of Belgium, the Sovereign of the Congo Free State from 1885 to 1908, Regent Place in Brussels, Belgium

- Belgian Congo (1908–1960, now the Democratic Republic of the Congo)
- Ruanda-Urundi (1922–1962, now Rwanda and Burundi)

==== France ====
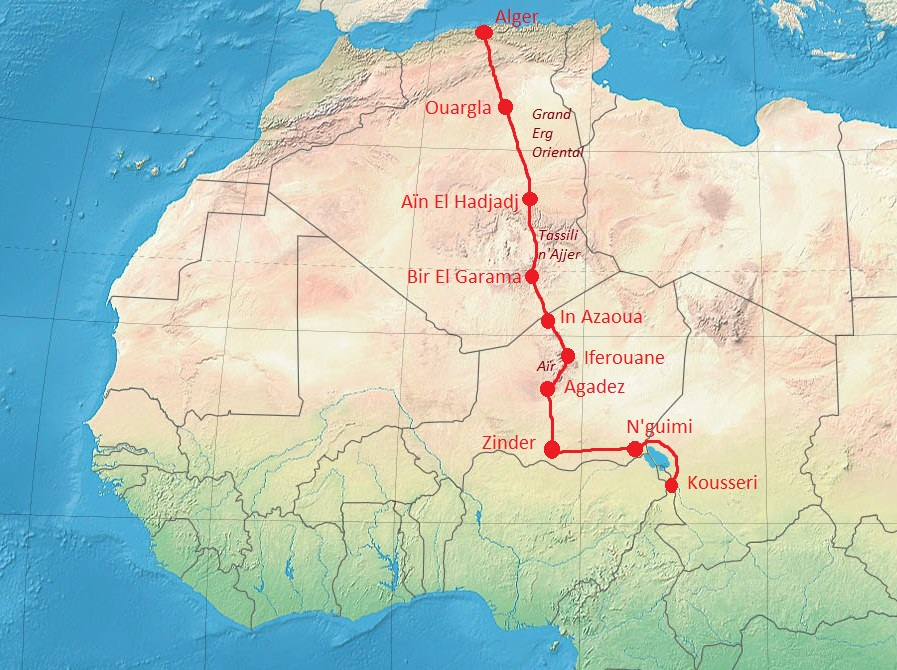
The Foureau-Lamy military expedition sent out from Algiers in 1898 to conquer the Chad Basin and unify all French territories in West Africa

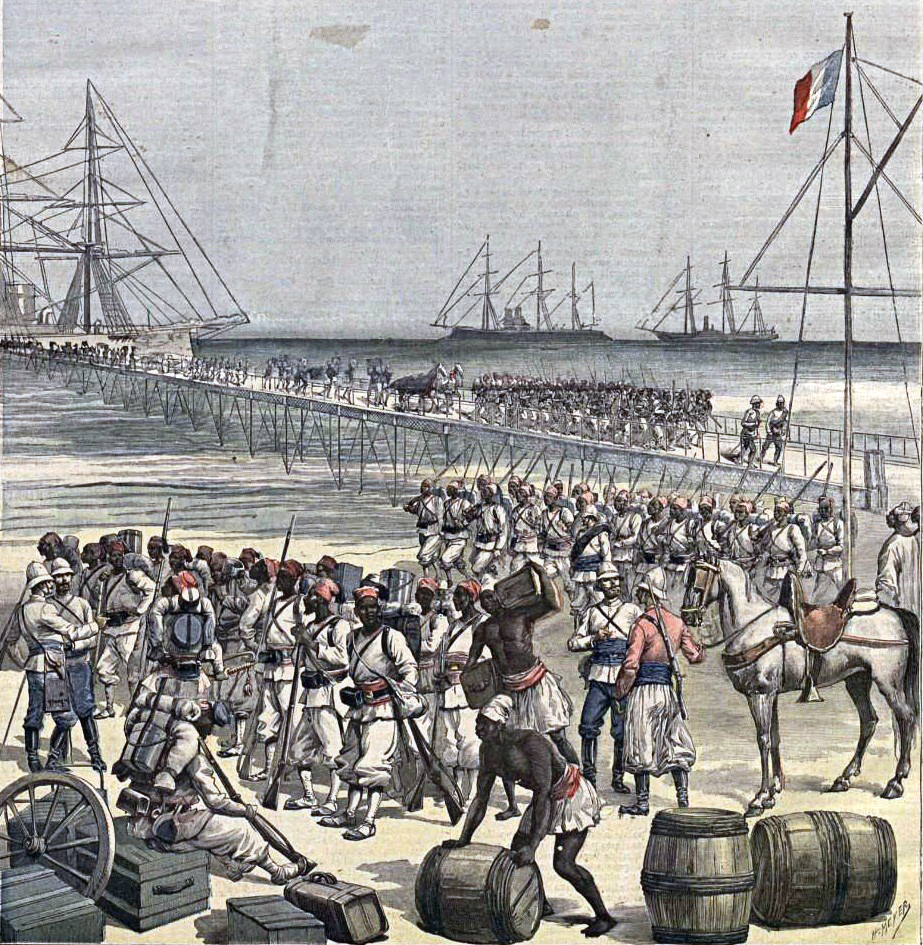
The Senegalese Tirailleurs, led by Colonel Alfred-Amédée Dodds, conquered Dahomey (present-day Benin) in 1892

- French West Africa:
  - Mauritania
  - Senegal
  - Albreda (1681–1857, now part of Gambia)
  - French Sudan (now Mali, 1880 – 1958)
  - Liberia Territorial losses of Liberia
  - French Guinea (now Guinea)
  - Ivory Coast
  - Niger
  - French Upper Volta (now Burkina Faso)
  - French Dahomey (now Benin)
  - French Togoland (1916–60, now Togo)
  - Enclaves of Forcados and Badjibo (in modern Nigeria)
- French Equatorial Africa:
  - Gabon
  - French Cameroun (1922–60)
  - French Congo (now Republic of the Congo)
  - Oubangui-Chari (now Central African Republic)
  - Chad
- French North Africa:
  - French Algeria (1830–1962; was administered as an integral part of France itself from 1848)
  - French Protectorate of Tunisia
  - French Protectorate of Morocco
  - Fezzan-Ghadames (1943–1951) (administration given by the UNO after its conquest by Charles de Gaulle)
  - Egypt (ownership (1798–1801)) (Condominium of France and the United Kingdom (1876–1882))
- French East Africa:
  - French Madagascar
  - Comoros
  - Scattered islands in the Indian Ocean
  - French Somaliland (now Djibouti)
  - Isle de France (1715–1810) (now Mauritius)

==== Germany ====
- German Kamerun (now Cameroon and part of Nigeria, 1884–1916)
- German East Africa (now Rwanda, Burundi and most of Tanzania, 1885–1919)
- German South-West Africa (now Namibia, 1884–1915)
- German Togoland (now Togo and eastern part of Ghana, 1884–1914)

After the First World War, Germany's possessions were partitioned among Britain (which took a sliver of western Cameroon, Tanzania, western Togo, and Namibia), France (which took most of Cameroon and eastern Togo) and Belgium (which took Rwanda and Burundi).

==== Italy ====
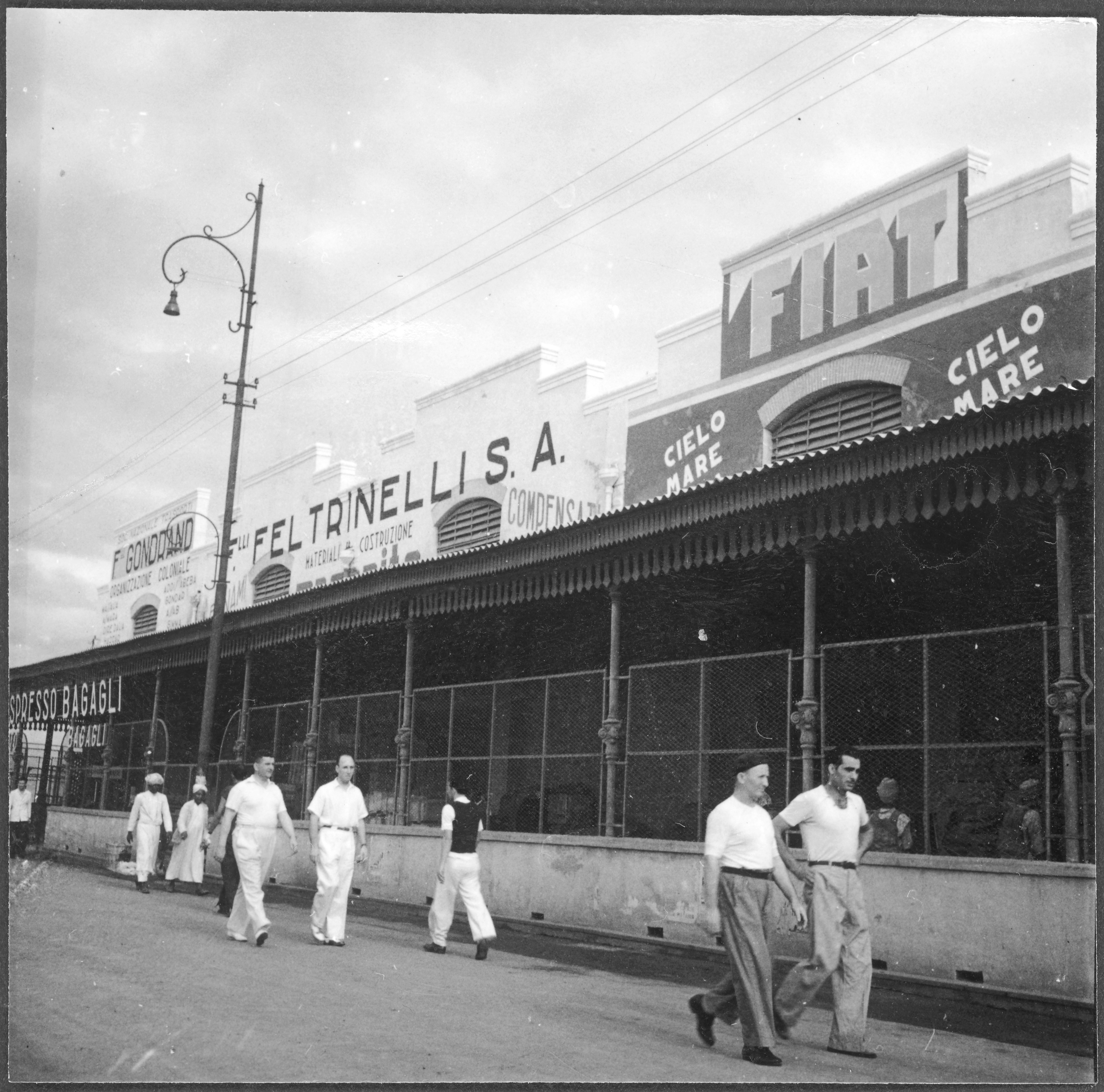
Italian settlers in Massawa

- Italian Eritrea (1882–1936)
- Italian Somalia (1889–1936)
- Italian Ethiopia (1936–1941)
  - Oltre Giuba (annexed into Italian Somalia in 1925)
- Libya
  - Italian Tripolitania (1911–1934)
  - Italian Cyrenaica (1911–1934)
  - Italian Libya (from the unification of Tripolitania and Cyrenaica in 1934) (1934–1943; coastal regions administered as an integral part of Italy itself from 1939 to 1943)

During the interwar period, Italian Ethiopia formed together with Italian Eritrea and Italian Somaliland the Italian East Africa (A.O.I., "Africa Orientale Italiana", also defined by the fascist government as L'Impero).

==== Portugal ====
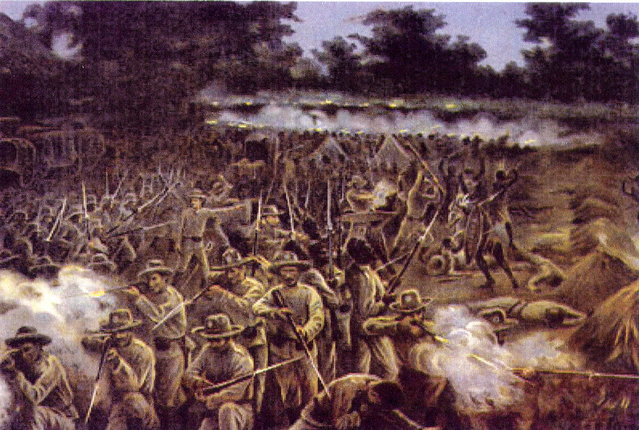
Marracuene in Portuguese Mozambique was the site of a decisive battle between Portuguese and Gaza king Gungunhana in 1895.

- Portuguese Angola (now Angola) (1575–1975)
- Portuguese Mozambique (now Mozambique) (1505–1975)
- Portuguese Guinea (now Guinea-Bissau) (1588–1975)
- Portuguese Gold Coast (now part of Ghana) (1482–1642)
- Portuguese Cape Verde (1462–1975)
- Portuguese São Tomé and Príncipe (1485–1975)
- Fort of São João Baptista de Ajudá (now part of Benin) (1721–1961)

On 11 June 1951, Portugal would begin to administer its colonies, including its ones in Africa, as Overseas provinces.

==== Spain ====
- Northern Spanish Morocco
  - Chefchaouen (Chauen)
    - Jebala (Yebala)
    - Kert
    - Loukkos (Lucus)
    - Rif
- Spanish West Africa (1946–1958)
  - Ifni (1934–1969)
  - Southern Spanish Morocco (Cape Juby)
  - Spanish Sahara (now Western Sahara) (1884–1958 as a colony of Spain; 1958–1976 as a Province of Spain)
    - Saguia el-Hamra
    - Río de Oro
- Spanish Guinea
  (now Equatorial Guinea) (1858–1968)
  - Fernando Pó
  - Río Muni
  - Annobón

==== United Kingdom ====
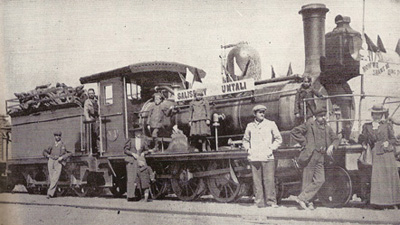
Opening of the railway in Rhodesia, 1899

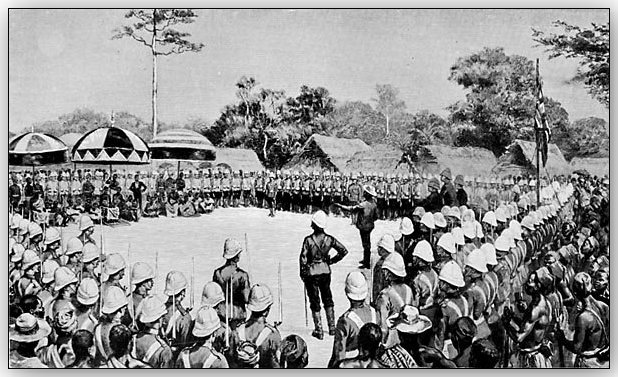
Following the Fourth Anglo-Ashanti War in 1896, the British proclaimed a protectorate over the Ashanti Kingdom.

The British were primarily interested in maintaining secure communication lines to India, which led to initial interest in Egypt and South Africa. Once these two areas were secure, it was the intent of British colonialists such as Cecil Rhodes to establish a Cape-Cairo railway and to exploit mineral and agricultural resources. Control of the Nile was viewed as a strategic and commercial advantage. Overall, by 1921, the British had control approximately 33.23% of Africa, or 3,897,920 mi^{2} (10,09,55,66 km^{2}).

- Egypt
- British Cyrenaica (1943–1951, now part of Libya)
- British Tripolitania (1943–1951, now part of Libya)
- Anglo-Egyptian Sudan (1899–1956)
- British Somaliland (now part of Somalia)
- British East Africa:
  - Kenya Colony
  - Uganda Protectorate
  - Tanzania:
    - Tanganyika Territory (1919–61)
    - Zanzibar
- British Mauritius
- Bechuanaland (now Botswana)
- Southern Rhodesia (now Zimbabwe)
- Northern Rhodesia (now Zambia)
- British Seychelles
- British South Africa
  - South Africa:
    - Transvaal Colony
    - Cape Colony
    - Colony of Natal
    - Orange River Colony
  - South-West Africa (from 1915, now Namibia)
- British West Africa
  - Gambia Colony and Protectorate
  - British Sierra Leone
  - Colonial Nigeria
  - British Togoland (1916–56, today part of Ghana)
  - Cameroons (1922–61, now part of Cameroon and Nigeria)
  - Gold Coast (British colony) (now Ghana)
- Nyasaland (now Malawi)
- Basutoland (now Lesotho)
- Swaziland (now Eswatini)
- Saint Helena, Ascension and Tristan da Cunha

==== Independent states ====
- Liberia was founded, colonized, established, and controlled by the American Colonization Society, a private organisation established in order to relocate freed African American and Caribbean slaves from the United States and the Caribbean islands in 1822. Liberia declared its independence from the American Colonization Society on July 26, 1847. Liberia is Africa's oldest republic and the second-oldest black republic in the world (after Haiti). Liberia maintained its independence during the period as it was viewed by European powers as either a territory, colony or protectorate of the United States.
- The same powers assumed Ethiopia to be a protectorate of Italy although the country had never accepted this, and its independence from Italy was recognized after the Battle of Adwa which resulted in the Treaty of Addis Ababa in 1896. The country remained independent until 1936 when it was occupied by Fascist Italy under Benito Mussolini and annexed with Italian-possessed Eritrea and Somaliland, later forming Italian East Africa; in 1941, during World War II, it was occupied by the British Army and its full sovereignty was restored in 1944 after a period of military administration.
- The Mbunda Kingdom, in present-day southeast Angola, also remained independent during the Scramble for Africa. At its greatest extent, it reached from Mithimoyi in central Moxico to the Cuando Cubango Province in the southeast, bordering Namibia. Portugal declared war on the kingdom in the Kolongongo War, and ultimately conquered it and captured King Mwene Mbandu Lyonthzi Kapova in 1917.
- When Germany established a colony in Namibia in 1884, they left the Ovambo kingdoms undisturbed. After World War I, Namibia was annexed by the South African government into the Union of South Africa; this brought major changes, with South African plantation, cattle breeding and mining operations entering the Ovamboland. The Portuguese colonial administration in Angola, who had previously focused on their coastal, northern and eastern operations, entered southern Angola to form a border with the expanding South African presence. The Ovambo people launched several armed rebellions against South African rule in the 1920s and 1930s, which were all suppressed by the Union Defence Force.
- The Dervish State existed from 1899 until 1920, after successfully repulsing the British Empire four times and forced it to retreat. The Dervish State was the only Muslim state on the African continent to maintain its independence. The Dervishes were finally defeated in 1920 after the Somaliland Campaign.
- Egba, a government of the Egba people in Nigeria, was legally recognised by the British as independent until being annexed into the Colony and Protectorate of Nigeria in 1914.

=== Connections to modern-day events ===
Oil and gas concessions in the Sudan – 2004

Anti-neoliberal scholars connect the old scramble to a new scramble for Africa, coinciding with the emergence of an "Afro-neoliberal" capitalist movement in postcolonial Africa. When African nations began to gain independence after World War II, their postcolonial economic structures remained undiversified and linear. In most cases, the bulk of a nation's economy relied on cash crops or natural resources. These scholars claim that the decolonisation process kept independent African nations at the mercy of colonial powers by structurally dependent economic relations. They also claim that structural adjustment programs led to the privatization and liberalization of many African political and economic systems, forcefully pushing Africa into the global capitalist market, and that these factors led to development under Western ideological systems of economics and politics.

=== Petrostates ===
In the era of globalization, several African countries have emerged as petrostates (for example Angola, Cameroon, Nigeria, and Sudan). These are nations with an economic and political partnership between transnational oil companies and the ruling elite class in oil-rich African nations. Numerous countries have entered into a neo-imperial relationship with Africa during this time period. Mary Gilmartin notes that "material and symbolic appropriation of space [is] central to imperial expansion and control"; nations in the globalization era who invest in controlling land internationally are engaging in neocolonialism. Chinese (and other Asian countries) state oil companies have entered Africa's highly competitive oil sector. China National Petroleum Corporation purchased 40% of Greater Nile Petroleum Operating Company. Furthermore, the Sudan exports 50–60% of its domestically produced oil to China, making up 7% of China's imports. China has also been purchasing equity shares in African oil fields, invested in industry related infrastructure development and acquired continental oil concessions throughout Africa.

== See also ==
=== Lists ===
- Chronology of Western colonialism
- List of European colonies in Africa
- List of kingdoms in Africa throughout history
- List of former sovereign states
- List of French possessions and colonies

=== Other topics ===
- Analysis of Western European colonialism and colonization
- Colonial Africa
- Durand Line
- Economic history of Africa
- European exploration of Africa
- French colonial empire
- Historiography of the British Empire
- International relations (1814–1919)
- Scramble for China
- Sykes–Picot Agreement
- White Africans of European ancestry
