= Kingdom of Angola =

Kingdom of Angola may refer to:

- Kasanje Kingdom, early modern state in northern Angola
- Kingdom of Matamba, early modern state in northern Angola
- Kingdom of Ndongo, early modern state in northern Angola
- Mbunda Kingdom, early modern state in eastern Angola
