= Kolongongo War =

1914-1917 conflict

- Part of Portuguese campaigns of pacification and occupation
Date	1914–1917
Location	Mbunda Kingdom
Result	Portuguese victory

Belligerents
Portugal: Portuguese West Africa	Mbunda Kingdom

The Kolongongo War was a war fought between the Mbunda people and the Portuguese in 1914. The war occurred as a result of the Portuguese's desire to expand their powers which was met with resistance by the Mbunda people. The Mbunda people often travelled around Africa trading goods and had minimal settlement until approximately 1500 when they settled in what is now south-eastern Angola.

== Events ==
During the war, in 1914, the king of the Mbunda, Mbandu Lyondthzi Kapova was captured by the Portuguese. His son, Mwene Mbandu II Kathzungo Shanda would succeed him as king of the Mbunda.
