= Mbunda Kingdom =

Former kingdom in southeast Angola

Mbunda Kingdom Reino Mbunda (Portuguese) Chiundi ca Mbunda (Mbunda)
- c. 1500–1917
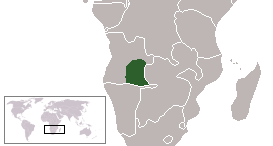
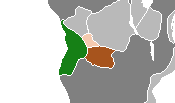
- Status: Sovereign kingdom
- Capital: Lumbala N'guimbo
- Common languages: Mbunda language Portuguese
- Ethnic groups: Mbunda people
- Religion: Christianity with some traditional practices
- Demonym: Mbundan
- Government: Absolute monarchy with autonomous regions
- King
  - c. 1870–1914: Mwene Mbandu Lyonthzi Kapova
  - 1914–1917: Mwene Mbandu II Kathzungo Shanda
- History
  - Established: c. 1500
  - Mwene Mbandu Lyonthzi Kapova captured by the Portuguese: 1914
  - Kolongongo War: 1914
  - Annexed by the Portuguese: 1917
- Currency: Traded in bee wax, ivory and rubber, in exchange with guns and cloth material
Preceded by	Succeeded by
Kingdom of Ndongo	Portuguese Angola
- Today part of: Angola; Namibia; Democratic Republic of the Congo; Zambia

The Mbunda Kingdom (Mbunda: Chiundi ca Mbunda or Vumwene vwa Chiundi or Portuguese: Reino dos Bundas), sometimes called the Kingdom of Angola or Mbundaland, was an African kingdom located in western central Africa, in what is now southeast Angola. At its greatest extent, it reached from Mithimoyi in central Moxico to the Cuando and Cubango provinces in the southeast, bordering Namibia.

== Politics and government ==
The Mbunda Kingdom used a traditional rule system similar to other nations of its era. The entire kingdom was ruled by one king who has come from a royal family. The king exercised absolute authority so their decision was carried out without question. The king's role was to legislate the laws and govern the communities. The king ruled the whole kingdom, however, the small chiefdoms and localities within the kingdom were also able to legislate their own laws.

== History ==
=== Establishment ===
In the 17th century, the Mbunda tribe moved southeast into what is now Angola due to a poor climate in the northeast. They reached what is now present-day Zambia and Angola, when they established a kingdom.

=== Expansion ===
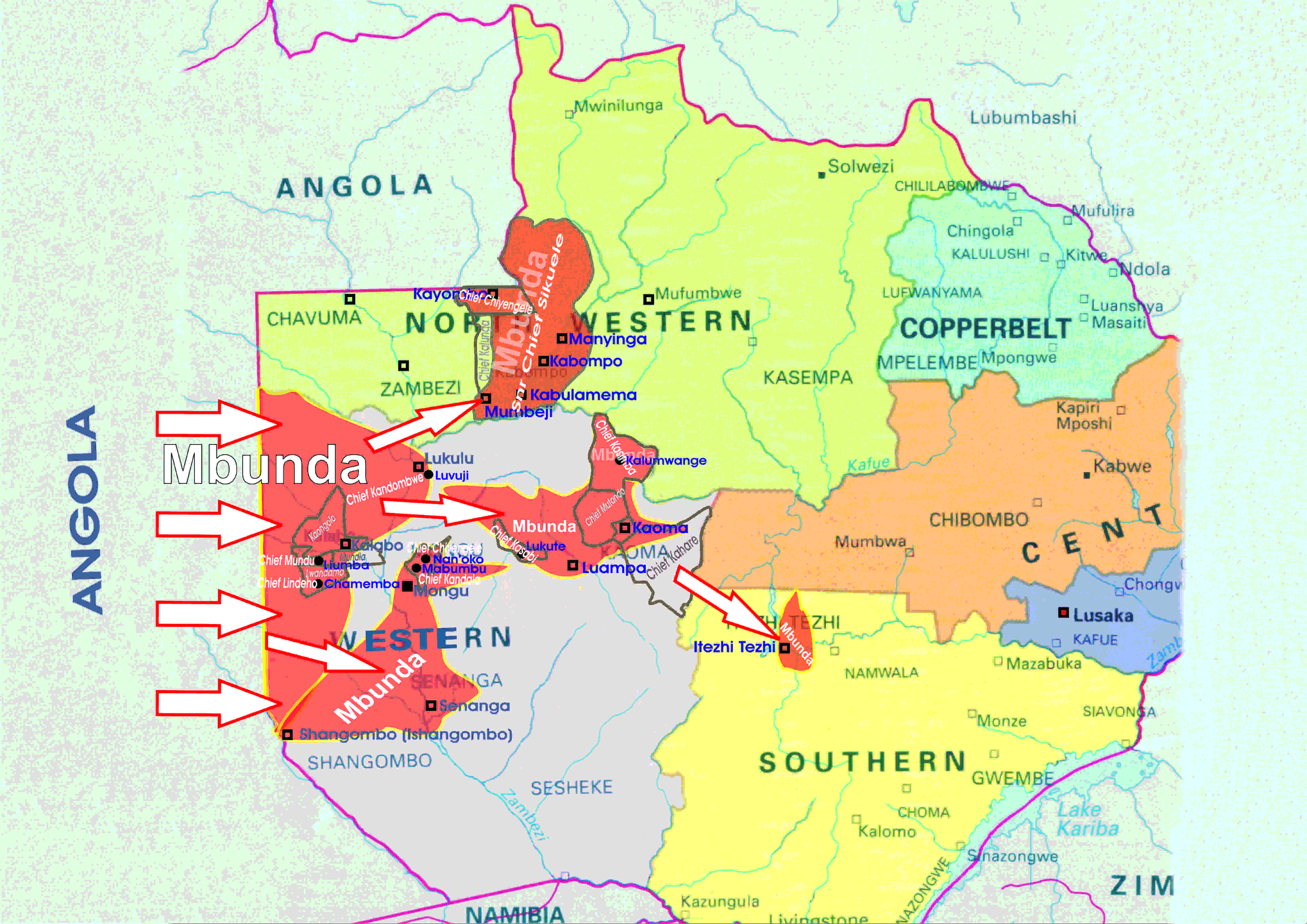
The Mbunda expansion into Barotseland

The kingdom began to expand southward around the time of their twelfth and thirteenth monarchs (Kathangila ka Mukenge and Yambayamba Kapanda). As they continued to expand southward, they arrived at the Lungwebungu River, and soon after they set Lumbala N'guimbo as their capital city. They also expanded into what is now Zambia, which was later taken away when the colonial borders were drawn.

=== Conflict with the Chokwe ===
The Mbunda and the Chokwe began fighting because it was believed the Chokwe assassinated King Mwene Katavola I Mwechela. His successor, Mwene Katavola II Musangu, was suspected of plotting his assassination. Mwene Katavola II Musangu later tried to marry a Chokwe slave named Nyakoma who was owned by the Chokwe Chief Mwa Mushilinjinji, who denied Mwene Katavola II Musangu to marry Nyakoma at Luwe. Because of this, the kingdom declared war on the Chokwe Chiefdom to rid them of the Mbunda's land. The war went in favour of the Mbunda and the Chokwe were conquered.

=== Early nineteenth century ===
In 1830, the Mbunda began to fight alongside the Aluyi in a war between the Aluyi and the Makololo. With the help of the Mbunda Kingdom, the Aluyi won the war and the Mbunda began to occupy Barotseland.

=== War with the Luvale ===
Mwene Mbandu I Lyondthzi Kapova led the Mbunda in a war against the Luvale around 1890 because the Luvale were against a powerful, independent Mbunda and they wanted Mbunda slaves. The Luvale lost the war when their leader, Masambo, was killed and were soon driven out of Mbunda.

=== Late nineteenth century ===
The Mbunda also fought alongside the Aluyi in 1880 in the Aluyi war against the Tonga. The Tonga were not able to defend against the Mbunda's bow and arrows and were unable to win the war. In 1893 a treaty was signed between the Mbunda and the Aluyi which stated that they would be allies. After this treaty, things became more peaceful and the Mbunda began to focus on harvesting cassava, maize and rice. Soon after the arrival of the IECA in 1880, a large majority of the Mbunda population was converted to Christianity.

=== Disestablishment ===
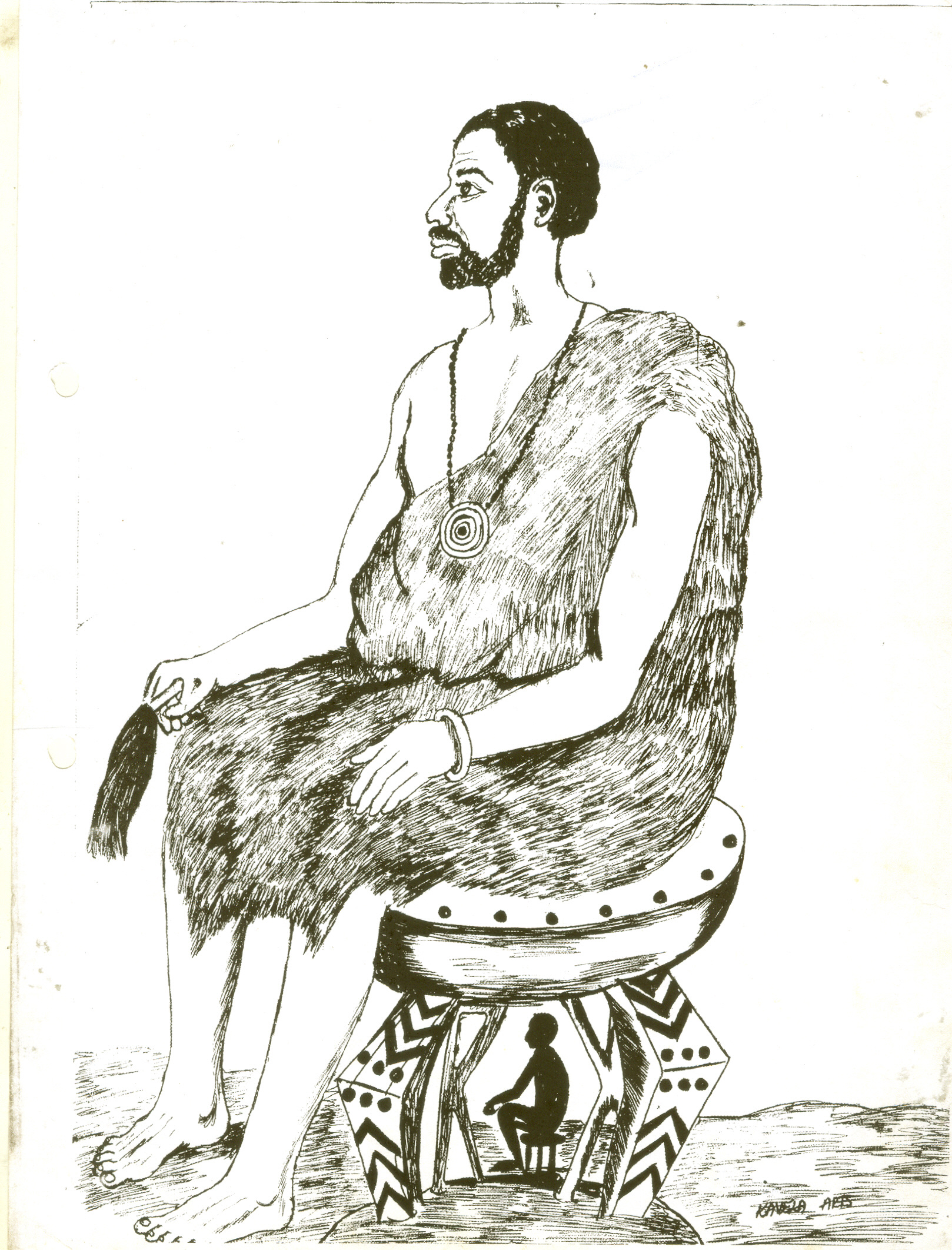
King Mwene Mbandu Lyonthzi Kapova I

Portugal declared war on the kingdom in 1914 in the Kolongongo War, where the Portuguese captured their king, Mwene Mbandu Lyonthzi Kapova. Portugal ultimately conquered the kingdom in 1917, although the monarchy still lives on within Angola today.

== Economy ==
The Mbunda were skilled iron and copper workers, as well as hunters and fishermen. They used bows and arrows to hunt medium-sized animals. To fish it was common to use nets or baskets. The nets were most commonly used by men and the baskets were used by women. The Mbunda farmed sugar and other crops along with cattle.

== See also ==
- Bundas
- Mbunda people
- Rulers of Mbundaland
