= Mwene Mbandu Kapova I of Mbunda =

Mwene Mbandu I Lyondthzi Kapova
- 21st King of the Mbunda people
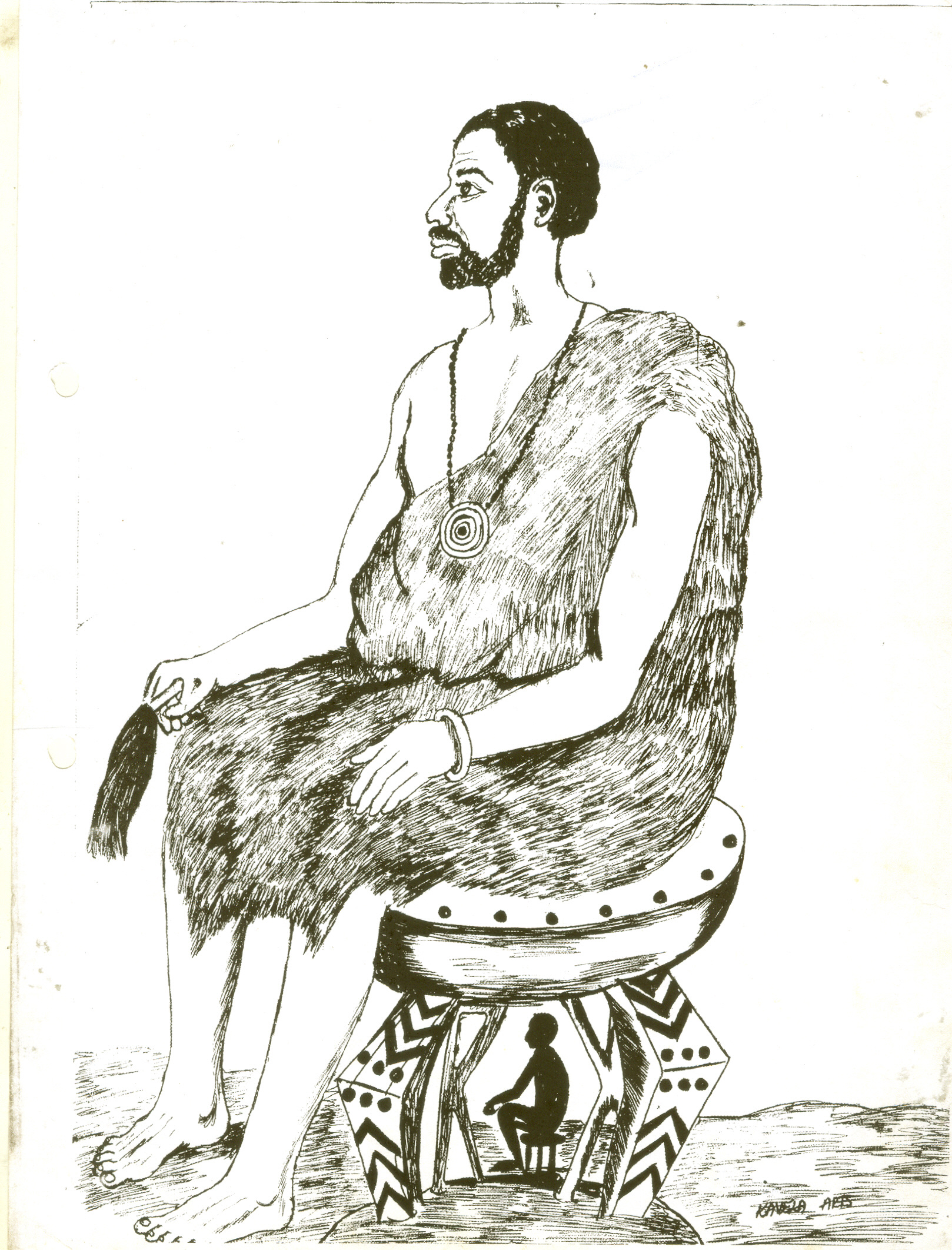
- Seated on his throne endowed in Mbunda Royal Insignia: Mande: the end of a cowrie shell worn suspended from the neck, signifies royalty; Lukano: The royal bracelet; Mufuka wa Shefu: Eland's tail fly switch, signifiesg majesty and dignity; Litanda (Chitwamo): Small figurine, signifies the successor and continuity of chieftainship; Missing Mbunda Royal Insignia on the image: Kalutambo (Mulamu wa Mwene): Chief's walking stick, signifies Authority; Mukwale: ceremonial double-edged sword, signifies power; Chimbuya: ceremonial ax; also a sign of power; Chilongo: Crown (headgear)
- Reign: 1800s - 1914
- Predecessor: Mwene Katavola II Musangu
- Successor: Mwene Kathzungo Shanda
- Born: Lyondthzi; 1800s
- Died: 1914; Unknown (Abducted by Portuguese colonialists)
- Burial: ? ?
- Issue: Prince Mumbamba Lyondthzi, Prince Limbwambwa Kalyangu Lyondthzi, Prince Kalimbwe Lyondthzi, Prince Kameya Muyeji Lyondthzi
Names
- Mbandu Lyondthzi Kapova
- Mbunda: Mbandu
- House: Kalyamba located in the valley of Lunjweva and Lwati rivers
- Dynasty: Mbandu
- Mother: Vamwene Vukolo Ngimbu Kanchungwa

King Mwene Mbandu I Lyondthzi Kapova was the 21st monarch of the Mbunda people in the southeast of present-day Angola before the Portuguese colonization of the Mbunda territory at the beginning of the 20th century, specifically Moxico. The prince played a significant role in the war against the Chokwe. He took over the Mbunda Kingdom from his nephew King Mwene Katavola II Musangu.

== Early life ==
Prince (Munamwene) Mbandu Lyondthzi Kapova was the son of Vamwene Vukolo Ngimbu Kanchungwa, one of the daughters of Vamwene Ngambo Lyambayi.

== See also ==
- Mbunda Kingdom
- Mbunda language
- Mbunda people
- List of The Rulers of the Mbunda Kingdom
