= Bantu peoples =

Ethnolinguistic group in Africa

Bantu
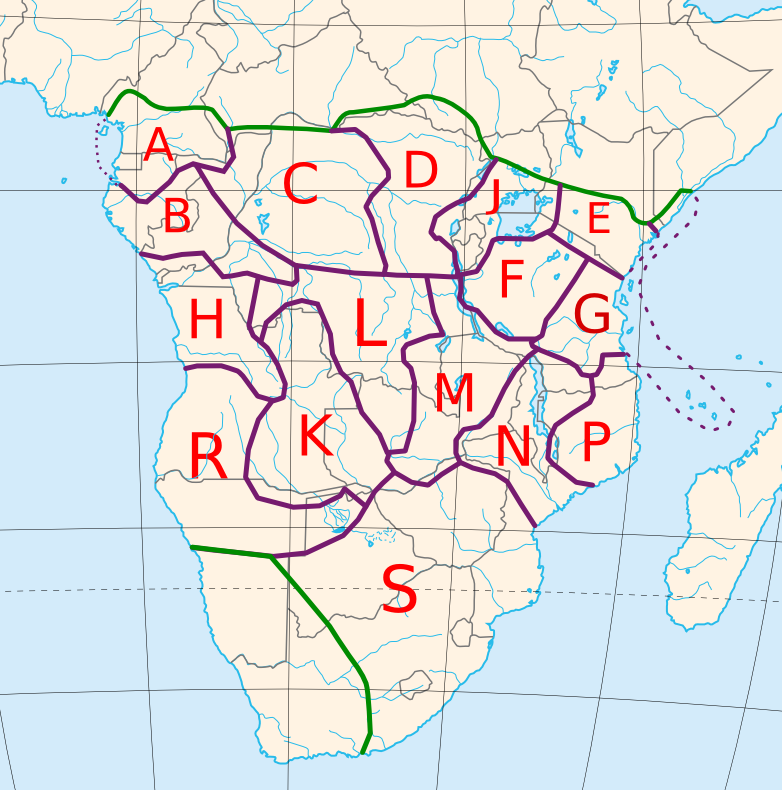
- Approximate distribution of Bantu peoples divided into zones according to the Guthrie classification of Bantu languages

Total population
- 350 million

Regions with significant populations
- DRC: c. 90 - 102 million
- Tanzania: c. 62 - 67 million
- South Africa: 50.4 million (2022)
- Mozambique: c. 34 million
- Uganda: c. 33.7 million
- Angola: c. 33 million
- Kenya: 28.7 million (2019)
- Zambia: c. 21,7 million (2025)
- Malawi: c. 21 million
- Zimbabwe: c. 16 million
- Cameroon: c. 6 - 7 million (2022)
- Burundi: c. 14.1 million
- Rwanda: c. 14 million
- Nigeria: c. 7.2 million
- Congo: c. 6.3 million (2025)
- Botswana: c. 2.4 million (2025)
- Lesotho: c. 2.3 million (2025)
- Namibia: c. 2.2 million
- Gabon: c. 2.1 million
- Equatorial Guinea: c. 1.5 million
- Somalia: c. 1.3 million
- Eswatini: c. 1.2 million
- Pakistan: c. 50 thousand - 1 million
- Comoros: c. 881 thousand
- Mayotte: c. 316 thousand
- India: c. 50 - 75 thousand (2023)
- Madagascar: c. 45 thousand

Languages
- Bantu languages (over 535); English · French · Portuguese · Afrikaans · Spanish · Arabic

Religion
- Mostly Christianity (Catholic · Protestant); Minorities: Islam · Native Bantu religions

Related ethnic groups
- other Niger-Congo speaking peoples

The Bantu peoples are an ethnolinguistic grouping of approximately 400 distinct Indigenous African ethnic groups who speak Bantu languages. The languages are native to countries spread over a vast area from West Africa, to Central Africa, Southeast Africa, East Africa and into Southern Africa. Bantu people also inhabit southern areas of Northeast African states.

There are several hundred Bantu languages. Depending on the definition of "language" or "dialect", it is estimated that there are between 440 and 680 distinct languages. The total number of speakers is in the hundreds of millions, ranging at roughly 350 million in the mid-2010s (roughly 30% of the population of Africa, or roughly 5% of the total world population). About 90 million speakers (2015), divided into some 400 ethnic or tribal groups, are found in the Democratic Republic of the Congo alone.

The larger of the individual Bantu groups have populations of several million, e.g. the Baganda people of Uganda (5.5 million as of 2014), the Shona of Zimbabwe (17.6 million as of 2020), the Zulu of South Africa (14.2 million as of 2016), the Luba of the Democratic Republic of the Congo (28.8 million as of 2010), the Sukuma of Tanzania (10.2 million as of 2016), the Kikuyu of Kenya (8.1 million as of 2019), the Xhosa people of Southern Africa (9.6 million as of 2011), Batswana of Southern Africa (8.2 million as of 2020) and the Pedi of South Africa (7 million as of 2018).

== Etymology ==
Map of the major Bantu languages shown within the Niger–Congo language family, with non-Bantu languages in greyscale.

Abantu is the Ndebele, Swazi, Xhosa and Zulu word for 'people'. It is the plural of the word umuntu, meaning 'person', and is based on the stem -ntu plus the plural prefix aba-.

In linguistics, the word Bantu, for the language families and its speakers, is an artificial term based on the reconstructed Proto-Bantu term for "people" or "humans". It was first introduced into modern academia (as Bâ-ntu) by Wilhelm Bleek in 1857 or 1858 and popularised in his Comparative Grammar of 1862. The name was said to be coined to represent the word for "people" in loosely reconstructed Proto-Bantu, from the plural noun class prefix *ba- categorizing "people", and the root *ntʊ̀ - "some (entity), any" (e.g. Xhosa umntu "person" abantu "people", Zulu, Ndebele and Swazi umuntu "person", abantu "people").

There is no native term for the people who speak Bantu languages because they are not an ethnic group. People speaking Bantu languages refer to their languages by ethnic endonyms, which did not have an indigenous concept prior to European contact for the larger ethnolinguistic phylum named by 19th-century European linguists. Bleek's coinage was inspired by the anthropological observation of groups self-identifying as "people" or "the true people". That is, idiomatically the reflexes of *bantʊ in the numerous languages often have connotations of personal character traits as encompassed under the values system of ubuntu, also known as hunhu in Chishona or botho in Sesotho, rather than just referring to all human beings.

The root in Proto-Bantu is reconstructed as *-ntʊ́. Versions of the word Bantu (that is, the root plus the class 2 noun class prefix *ba-) occur in all Bantu languages: for example, as bantu in Kikongo, Kituba, Tshiluba and Kiluba; watu in Swahili; ŵanthu in Tumbuka; anthu in Chichewa; batu in Lingala; bato in Duala; abanto in Gusii; andũ in Kamba and Kikuyu; abantu in Kirundi, Lusoga, Zulu, Xhosa, Runyoro and Luganda; wandru in Shingazidja; abantru in Mpondo and Ndebele; bãthfu in Phuthi; bantfu in Swati and Bhaca; banhu in kisukuma; banu in Lala; vanhu in Shona and Tsonga; batho in Sesotho, Tswana and Sepedi; antu in Meru; andu in Embu; vandu in some Luhya dialects; vhathu in Venda and bhandu in Nyakyusa.

Within the fierce debate among linguists about the word "Bantu", Seidensticker (2024) indicates that there has been a "profound conceptual trend in which a 'purely technical [term] without any non-linguistic connotations was transformed into a designation referring indiscriminately to language, culture, society, and race'."

== History ==
=== Origins and expansion ===
The predominant paternal haplogroup among the Bantu is E1b1a1-M2. The ancestors of the Bantu originally came from Northeast Africa and moved around the Green Sahara. The gradual movement of the Proto Bantu to West/Central Africa (the area of modern-day Cameroon) may have been associated with the expansion of Sahel agriculture in the African Neolithic period, following the desiccation of the Sahara in c. 3500 BCE.

Bantu languages derive from the Proto-Bantu reconstructed language, estimated to have been spoken about 4,000 to 3,000 years ago in the area of modern-day Cameroon. They were supposedly spread across Central, East and Southern Africa in the so-called Bantu expansion, comparatively rapid dissemination taking roughly two millennia and dozens of human generations during the 1st millennium BCE and the 1st millennium CE.

=== Bantu expansion ===
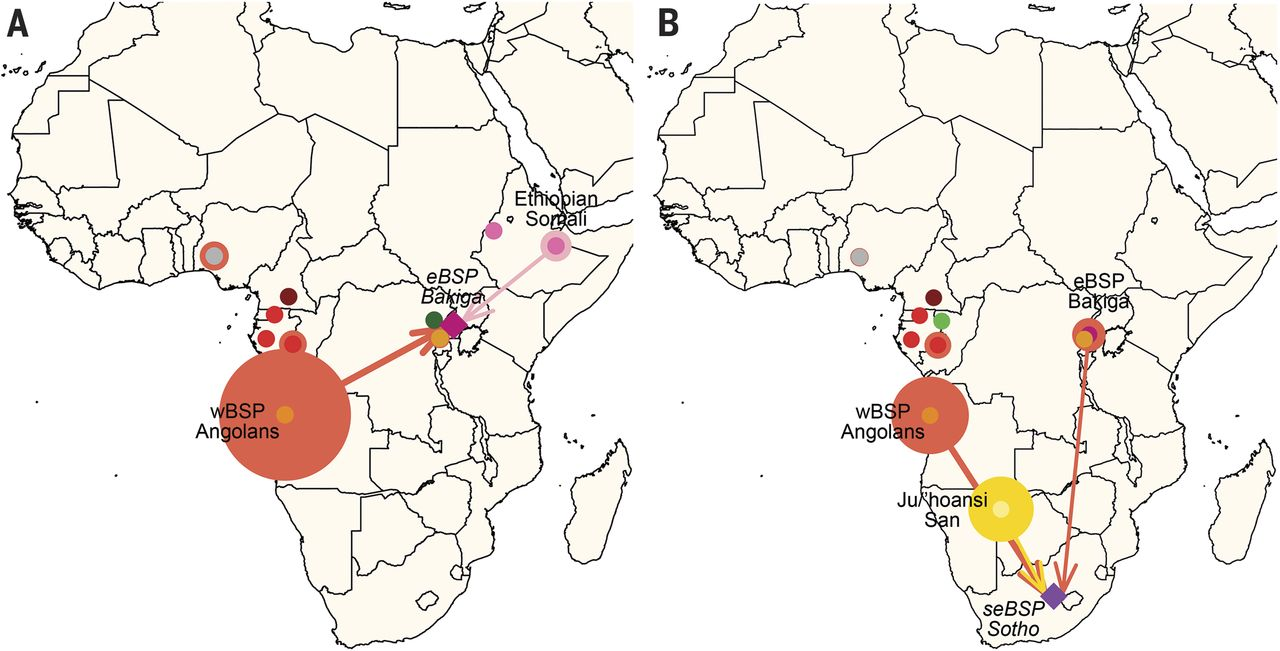
Reconstructing the dispersal of Bantu-speaking populations.

Scientists from the Institut Pasteur and the CNRS, together with a broad international consortium, retraced the migratory routes of the Bantu populations, which were previously a source of debate. The scientists used data from a vast genomic analysis of more than 2,000 samples taken from individuals in 57 populations throughout Sub-Saharan Africa to trace the Bantu expansion. During a wave of expansion that began 4,000 to 5,000 years ago, Bantu-speaking populations – some 310 million people as of 2023 – gradually left their original homeland West-Central Africa and travelled to the eastern and southern regions of the African continent.

During the Bantu expansion, Bantu-speaking peoples absorbed or displaced many earlier inhabitants, with only a few modern peoples such as Pygmy groups in Central Africa, the Hadza people in northern Tanzania, and various Khoisan populations across southern Africa remaining in existence into the era of European contact. Archaeological evidence attests to their presence in areas subsequently occupied by Bantu speakers. Researchers have demonstrated that the Khoisan of the Kalahari are remnants of a huge ancestral population that may have been the most populous group on the planet prior to the Bantu expansion. Biochemist Stephan Schuster of Nanyang Technological University in Singapore and colleagues found that the Khoisan population began a drastic decline when the Bantu farmers spread through Africa 4,000 years ago.

=== Hypotheses of early Bantu expansion ===
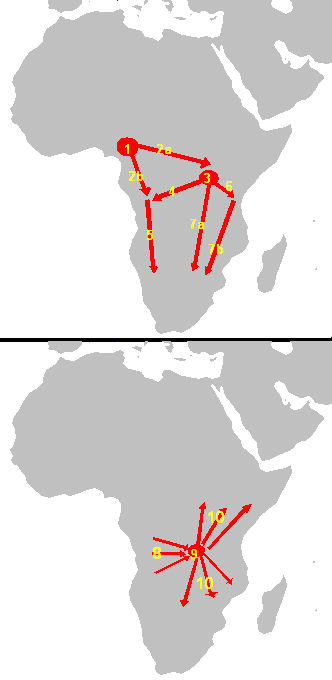
1 = 2000–1500 BC original Bantu urheimat (present-day Cameroon-Nigeria border) 2 = c. 1500 BC first dispersal 2.a = Eastern Bantu, 2.b = Western Bantu 3 = 1000–500 BC Urewe nucleus of Eastern Bantu 4–7 = southward advance 9 = 500 BC – 0 DR Congo nucleus 10 = 0–1000 AD last phase

Before the Bantu expansion had been definitively traced starting from their origins in the region between Cameroon and Nigeria, two main scenarios of the Bantu expansion were hypothesized: an early expansion to Central Africa and a single origin of the dispersal radiating from there, or an early separation into an eastward and a southward wave of dispersal, with one wave moving across the Congo Basin toward East Africa, and another moving south along the African coast and the Congo River system toward Angola.

Genetic analysis shows a significant clustered variation of genetic traits among Bantu language speakers by region, suggesting admixture from prior local populations. Bantu speakers of South Africa (Xhosa, Venda) showed substantial levels of the SAK and Western African Bantu AACs and low levels of the East African Bantu AAC (the latter is also present in Bantu speakers from the Democratic Republic of Congo and Rwanda). The results indicate distinct East African Bantu migration into southern Africa and are consistent with linguistic and archeological evidence of East African Bantu migration from an area west of Lake Victoria and the incorporation of Khoekhoe ancestry into several of the Southeast Bantu populations ~1500 to 1000 years ago.

Bantu-speaking migrants would have also interacted with some Afro-Asiatic outlier groups in the southeast (mainly Cushitic), as well as Nilotic and Central Sudanic speaking groups.

According to the early-split scenario as hypothesized in the 1990s, the southward dispersal had reached the Congo rainforest by about 1500 BCE and the southern savannas by 500 BC, while the eastward dispersal reached the Great Lakes by 1000 BCE, expanding further from there as the rich environment supported dense populations. Possible movements by small groups to the southeast from the Great Lakes region could have been more rapid, with initial settlements widely dispersed near the coast and near rivers, because of comparatively harsh farming conditions in areas farther from water. Recent archeological and linguistic evidence about population movements suggests that pioneering groups had reached parts of modern KwaZulu-Natal in South Africa sometime prior to the 3rd century CE along the coast and the modern Northern Cape by 500 CE.

Cattle terminology in use amongst the relatively few modern Bantu pastoralist groups suggests that the acquisition of cattle may have been from Central Sudanic, Kuliak and Cushitic-speaking neighbors. Linguistic evidence also indicates that the customs of milking cattle were also directly modeled from Cushitic cultures in the area. Cattle terminology in southern African Bantu languages differs from that found among more northerly Bantu-speaking peoples. One recent suggestion is that Cushitic speakers had moved south earlier and interacted with the most northerly of Khoisan speakers who acquired cattle from them and that the earliest arriving Bantu speakers, in turn, got their initial cattle from Cushitic-influenced Khwe-speaking people. Under this hypothesis, larger later Bantu-speaking immigration subsequently displaced or assimilated that southernmost extension of the range of Cushitic speakers.

Based on dental evidence, Irish (2016) concluded: Proto-Bantu peoples may have originated in the western region of the Sahara, amid the Kiffian period at Gobero, and may have migrated southward, from the Sahara into various parts of West Africa (e.g., Benin, Cameroon, Ghana, Nigeria, Togo), as a result of desertification of the Green Sahara in 7000 BCE. From Nigeria and Cameroon, agricultural Proto-Bantu peoples began to migrate, and amid migration, diverged into East Bantu peoples (e.g., Democratic Republic of Congo) and West Bantu peoples (e.g., Congo, Gabon) between 2500 BCE and 1200 BCE. Irish (2016) also views Igbo people and Yoruba people as being possibly back-migrated Bantu peoples.

=== Later history ===
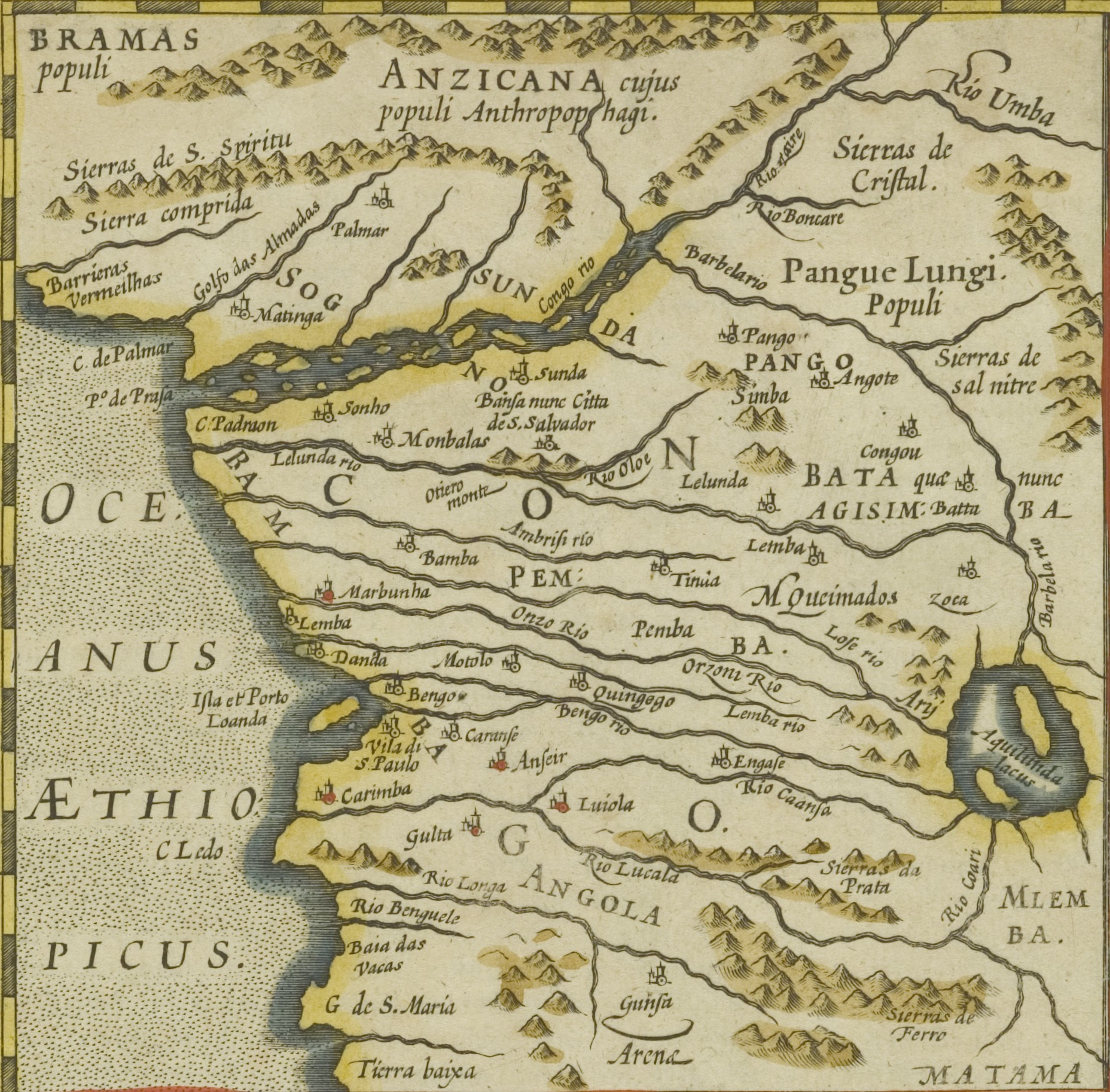
The Bantu Kingdom of Kongo, c. 1623

Between the 9th and 15th centuries, Bantu-speaking states began to emerge in the Great Lakes region and in the savanna south of the Central African rainforests. The Monomotapa kings built the Great Zimbabwe complex, a civilisation ancestral to the Shona people. Comparable sites in Southern Africa include Bumbusi in Zimbabwe and Manyikeni in Mozambique.

From the 12th century onward, the processes of state formation amongst Bantu peoples increased in frequency. This was the result of several factors such as a denser population (which led to more specialized divisions of labor, including military power while making emigration more difficult); technological developments in economic activity; and new techniques in the political-spiritual ritualisation of royalty as the source of national strength and health. Examples of such Bantu states include: the Kingdom of Kongo, Anziku Kingdom, Kingdom of Ndongo, the Kingdom of Matamba, the Kuba Kingdom, the Lunda Empire, the Luba Empire, Barotse Empire, Kazembe Kingdom, Mbunda Kingdom, Yeke Kingdom, Kasanje Kingdom, Empire of Kitara, Butooro, Bunyoro, Buganda, Busoga, Rwanda, Burundi, Ankole, the Kingdom of Mpororo, the Kingdom of Igara, the Kingdom of Kooki, the Kingdom of Karagwe, Swahili city states, the Mutapa Empire, the Zulu Kingdom, the Ndebele Kingdom, Mthethwa Empire, Tswana city states, Mapungubwe, Kingdom of Eswatini, the Kingdom of Butua, Maravi, Danamombe, Khami, Naletale, Kingdom of Zimbabwe and the Rozwi Empire.

On the coastal section of East Africa, a mixed Bantu community developed through contact with Muslim Arab and Persian traders, Zanzibar being an important part of the Indian Ocean slave trade. The Swahili culture that emerged from these exchanges evinces many Arab and Islamic influences not seen in traditional Bantu culture, as do the many Afro-Arab members of the Bantu Swahili people. With its original speech community centered on the coastal parts of Zanzibar, Kenya, and Tanzania – a seaboard referred to as the Swahili Coast – the Bantu Swahili language contains many Arabic loanwords as a result of these interactions. The Bantu migrations, and centuries later the Indian Ocean slave trade, brought Bantu influence to Madagascar, the Malagasy people showing Bantu admixture, and their Malagasy language Bantu loans. Toward the 18th and 19th centuries, the flow of Zanj slaves from Southeast Africa increased with the rise of the Sultanate of Zanzibar. With the arrival of European colonialists, the Zanzibar Sultanate came into direct trade conflict and competition with Portuguese and other Europeans along the Swahili Coast, leading eventually to the fall of the Sultanate and the end of slave trading on the Swahili Coast in the mid-20th century.

== List of Bantu groups by country ==
Country	Total population (millions, 2015 est.)	% Bantu	Bantu population (millions, 2015 est.)	Zones	Bantu groups
Democratic Republic of the Congo	77	80%	76	B, C, D, H, J, K, L, M	Bakongo, Mongo, Baluba, numerous others (Ambala, Ambuun, Angba, Babindi, Baboma, Baholo, Balunda, Bangala, Bango, Batsamba, Bazombe, Bemba, Bembe, Bira, Bowa, Dikidiki, Dzing, Fuliiru, Havu, Hema, Hima, Hunde, Hutu, Iboko, Kanioka, Kaonde, Kuba, Komo, Kwango, Lengola, Lokele, Lupu, Lwalwa, Mbala, Mbole, Mbuza (Budja), Nande, Ngoli, Bangoli, Ngombe, Nkumu, Nyanga, Bapende, Popoi, Poto, Sango, Shi, Songo, Sukus, Tabwa, Tchokwé, Téké, Tembo, Tetela, Topoke, Ungana, Vira, Wakuti, Nyindu, Yaka, Yakoma, Yanzi, Yeke, Yela, total 80% Bantu)
Tanzania	51	95%	c. 45	E, F, G, J, M, N, P	Abakuria, Sukuma, Nyamwezi, Haya, Chaga, Gogo, Makonde, Ngoni, Matumbi, numerous others (majority Bantu)
South Africa	55	75%	40	S	Nguni (Zulu, Hlubi, Xhosa, Southern Ndebele, Swazi), Basotho (South Sotho), Bapedi (North Sotho), Venda, Batswana, Tsonga, Kgaga (North Sotho), total 75% Bantu
Kenya	46	60%	37	E, J	Agikuyu, Abaluhya, Abasuba, Akamba, Abagusii, Ameru, Abakuria, Aembu, Ambeere, Taita, Pokomo, Taveta and Mijikenda, numerous others (60% Bantu)
Mozambique	28	99%	28	N, P, S	Makua, Sena, Shona (Ndau and Manyika), Shangaan (Tsonga), Makonde, Yao, Swahili, Tonga, Chopi, Ngoni
Uganda	37	80%	c. 25	D, J	Baganda, Basoga, Bagwere, Banyoro, Banyankole, Bakiga, Batooro, Bamasaba, Basamia, Bakonjo, Baamba, Baruuli, Banyole, Bafumbira, Bagungu (majority Bantu)
Angola	26	97%	25	H, K, R	Ovimbundu, Ambundu, Bakongo, Bachokwe, Balunda, Ganguela, Ovambo, Herero, Xindonga (97% Bantu)
Malawi	16	99%	16	N	Chewa, Tumbuka, Yao, Lomwe, Sena, Tonga, Ngoni, Ngonde
Zambia	15	99%	15	L, M, N	Nyanja-Chewa, Bemba, Tonga, Tumbuka, BaLunda, Balovale, Kaonde, Nkoya and Lozi, about 70 groups total.
Zimbabwe	14	99%	14	S	Shona(including Kalanga and Ndau), Northern Ndebele, Venda, Tswana, Sotho, Xhosa, Tonga, Chewa numerous minor groups.
Rwanda	11	76%	11	J	Hutu, Tutsi.
Burundi	10	78%	10	J	Hutu, Tutsi.
Cameroon	31	22%	6	A	Bulu, Duala, Ewondo, Bafia Bassa, Bakoko, Barombi, Mbo, Subu, Bakwe, Oroko, Bafaw, Bekpak, Mbam speakers
Republic of the Congo	5	97%	5	B, C, H	Bakongo, Sangha, Mbochi, Bateke, Bandzabi, Bapunu, Bakuni, Bavili, Batsangui, Balari, Babémbé, Bayaka, Badondo, Bayaka, Bahumbu.
Botswana	2.2	90%	2.0	R, S	Batswana, BaKalanga, Mayeyi 90% Bantu
Equatorial Guinea	2.0	15%	1.9	A	Bubi, Ndowe, Bujeba
Lesotho	1.9	99%	1.9	S	Basotho
Gabon	1.9	65%	1.8	B	Nzebi, Myene, Kota, Shira, Punu, Kande.
Namibia	2.3	70%	1.6	K, R	Ovambo, Kavango, Herero, Himba, Mayeyi 70% Bantu
Eswatini	1.1	99%	1.1	S	Swazi, Zulu, Tsonga
Somalia	13.8	<15%	<2.1	E	Somali Bantu, Bajuni
Comoros	0.8	99%	0.8	E, G	Comorian People
Sub-Saharan Africa	970	c. 37%	c. 360		

== Use in South Africa ==
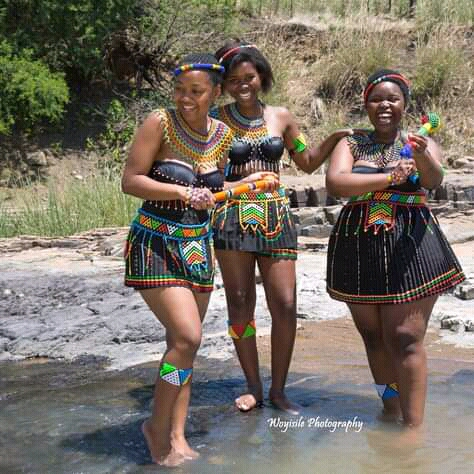
Unmarried Zulu women in Southern Africa

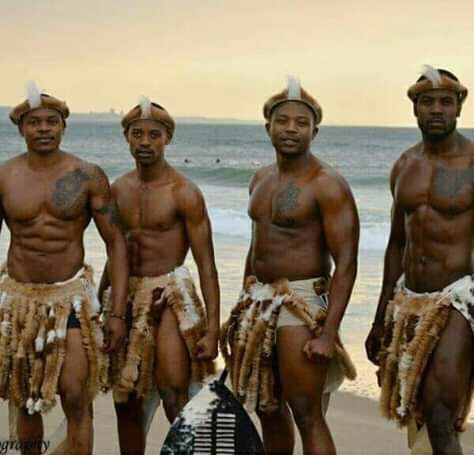
Zulu men dressed in traditional aprons, carrying ceremonial weapons.

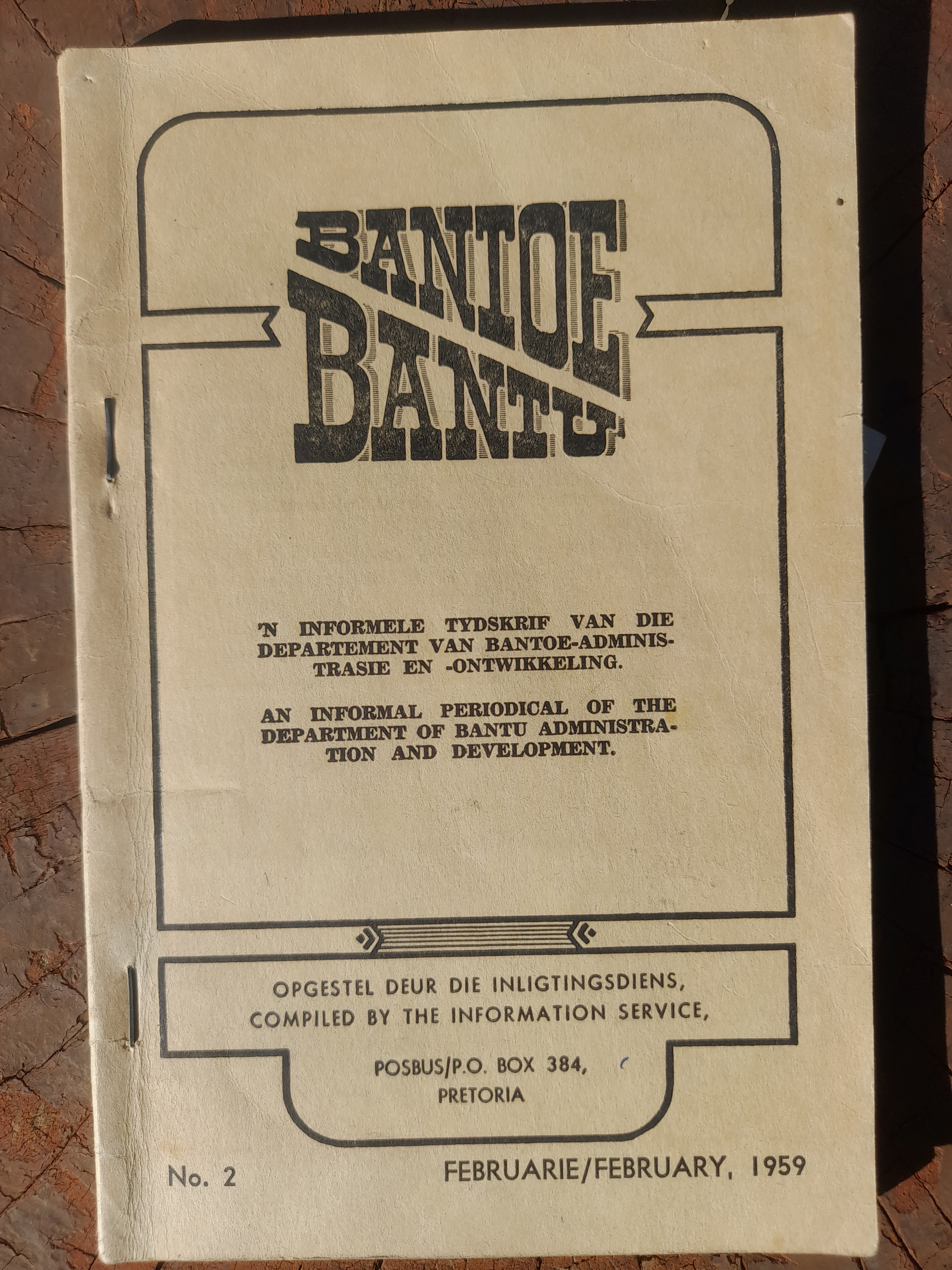
Bantu Apartheid publication, Feb 1959

In the 1920s, relatively liberal South Africans, missionaries, and the native African intelligentsia began to use the term "Bantu" in preference to "Native". After World War II, the National Party governments adopted that usage officially, while the growing African nationalist movement and its liberal allies turned to the term "African" instead, so that "Bantu" became identified with the policies of apartheid. By the 1970s this so discredited "Bantu" as an ethnic-racial designation that the apartheid government switched to the term "Black" in its official racial categorizations, restricting it to Bantu-speaking Africans, at about the same time that the Black Consciousness Movement led by Steve Biko and others were defining "Black" to mean all non-European South Africans (Bantus, Khoisan, Coloureds and Indians). In modern South Africa, the word's connection to apartheid has resulted in its being used only in its original linguistic meaning.

Examples of South African usages of "Bantu" include:

1. One of South Africa's politicians of recent times, General Bantubonke Harrington Holomisa (Bantubonke is a compound noun meaning "all the people"), is known as Bantu Holomisa.
2. The South African apartheid governments originally gave the name "bantustans" to the eleven rural reserve areas intended for nominal independence to deny indigenous Bantu South Africans citizenship. "Bantustan" originally reflected an analogy to the various ethnic "-stans" of Western and Central Asia. Again association with apartheid discredited the term, and the South African government shifted to the politically appealing but historically deceptive term "ethnic homelands". Meanwhile, the anti-apartheid movement persisted in calling the areas bantustans, to drive home their political illegitimacy.
3. The abstract noun ubuntu, humanity or humaneness, is derived regularly from the Nguni noun stem -ntu in Xhosa, Zulu and Ndebele. In Swati the stem is -ntfu and the noun is buntfu.
4. In the Sotho–Tswana languages of Southern Africa, batho is the cognate term to Nguni abantu, illustrating that such cognates need not actually look like the -ntu root exactly. The early African National Congress had a newspaper called Abantu-Batho from 1912 to 1933, which carried columns written in English, Zulu, Sotho, and Xhosa.

== See also ==
- African Pygmies
- Bantu mythology
- Bantu music
- Congoid
- Demographics of Africa
- Dume district
- Genetic history of Sub-Saharan Africa
- History of West Africa
- Khoisan
- Languages of Africa
- List of ethnic groups of Africa
