= Demographics of Angola =

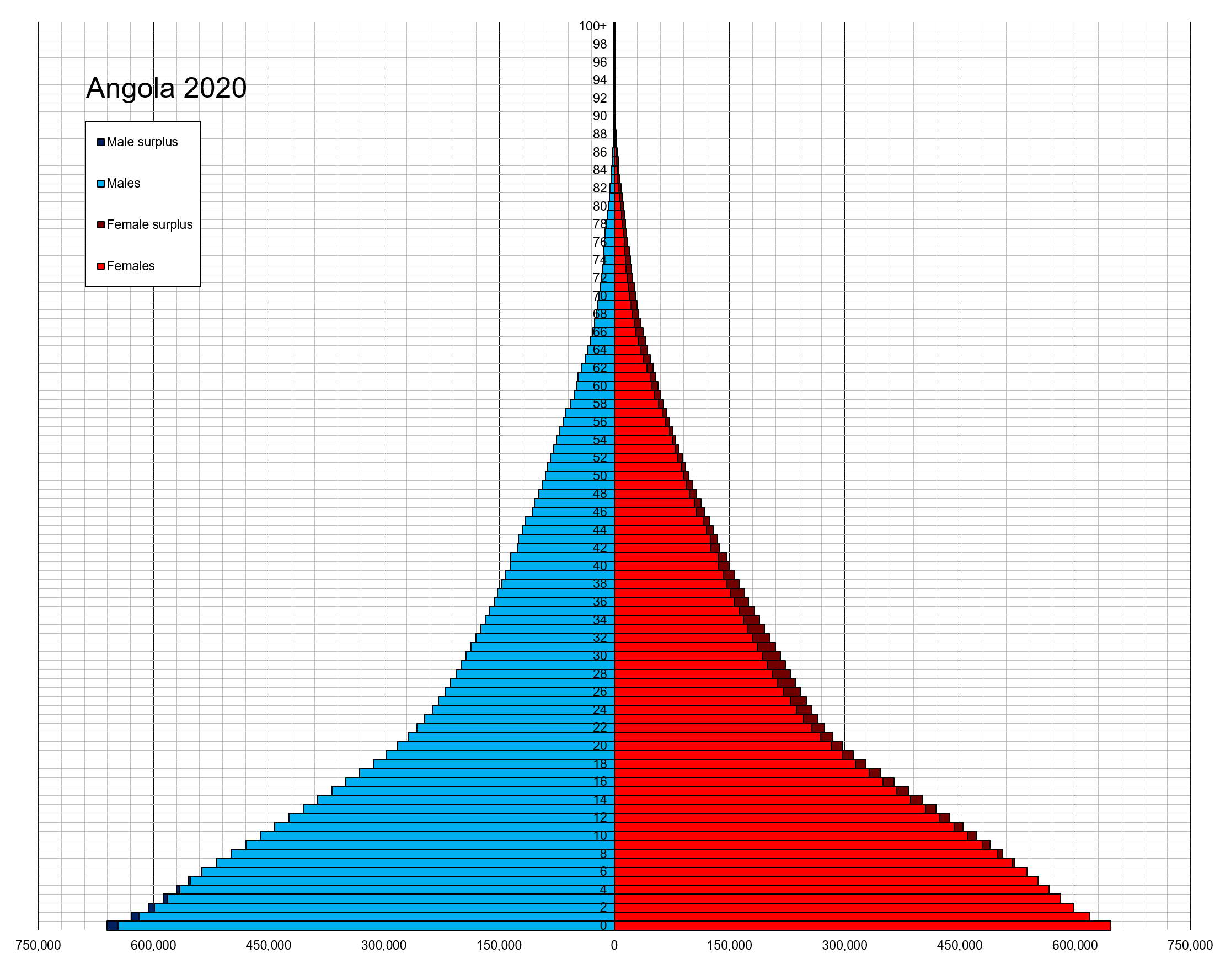
- Population pyramid of Angola in 2020
- Population: 34,795,287
- Birth rate: 36.6 births/1,000 population (2025 est.)
- Death rate: 6.80 deaths/1,000 population (2025 est.)
- Life expectancy: 62.11 years
- Fertility rate: 4.95 children born/woman (2025 est.)
- Net migration rate: -0.19 migrant(s)

Age structure
- 0–14 years: 47.83%
- 65 and over: 2.3%

Nationality
- Nationality: Angolan

Demographic features of the population of Angola include population density, ethnicity, education level, health of the populace, economic status, religious affiliations and other aspects.

Angolas population between 1960 and 2017.

According to 2014 census data, Angola had a population of 25,789,024 inhabitants in 2014. Ethnically, there are three main groups, each speaking a Bantu language: the Ovimbundu who represent 37% of the population, the Ambundu with 25%, and the Bakongo 11%. Other numerically important groups include the closely interrelated Chokwe and Lunda, the Ganguela and Nyaneka-Khumbi (in both cases classification terms that stand for a variety of small groups), the Ovambo, the Herero, the Xindonga and scattered residual groups of San. In addition, mixed race (European and African) people amount to about 7%, with nearly 1% of the population being whites, mainly ethnically Portuguese.

As a former overseas territory of Portugal until 1975, Angola possesses a Portuguese population of over 200,000, a number that has been growing from 2000 onwards, because of Angola's growing demand for qualified human resources. Currently, around 300,000 Angolans are white, around 500,000 Angolans are mixed race or black and white, and around 50,000 Angolans are from China. This accounts for around 850,000 people. In 1974, white Angolans made up a population of 335,000 people in an overall population of 6.3 million Angolans at that time. The only reliable source on these numbers is Gerald Bender & Stanley Yoder, Whites in Angola on the Eve of Independence: The Politics of Numbers, Africa Today, 21 (4) 1974, pp. 23 – 37. Today, many Angolans who are not ethnic Portuguese can claim Portuguese nationality under Portuguese law. Estimates on the overall population are given in O Pais. Besides the Portuguese, significant numbers of people from other European and from diverse Latin American countries (especially Brazil) can be found. From the 2000s, many Chinese have settled and started up small businesses, while at least as many have come as workers for large enterprises (construction or other). Observers claim that the Chinese community in Angola might include as many as 300,000 persons at the end of 2010, but reliable statistics are not at this stage available. In 1974/75, over 25,000 Cuban soldiers arrived in Angola to help the MPLA forces at the beginning of the Angolan Civil War. Once this was over, a massive development cooperation in the field of health and education brought in numerous civil personnel from Cuba. However, only a very small percentage of all these people has remained in Angola, either for personal reasons (intermarriage) or as professionals (e.g., medical doctors).

The largest religious denomination is Catholicism, to which adheres about half the population. Roughly 26% are followers of traditional forms of Protestantism (Congregationals, Methodists, Baptista, Lutherans, Reformed), but over the last decades there has in addition been a growth of Pentecostal communities and African Initiated Churches. In 2006, one out of 221 people were Jehovah's Witnesses. Africans from Mali, Nigeria and Senegal are mostly Sunni Muslims, but do not make up more than 1- 2% of the population. By now few Angolans retain African traditional religions.

== Population ==
Demographics development according to the United Nations

According to the 2022 revision of the world factbook the total population was 34,795,287 in 2022. The proportion of children below the age of 14 in 2020 was 47.83%, 49.87% was between 15 and 65 years of age, while 2.3% was 65 years or older.

	Total population	Population aged 0–14 (%)	Population aged 15–64 (%)	Population aged 65+ (%)
1950	4,148,000	41.2	55.7	3.1
1955	4,542,000	42.4	54.9	2.7
1960	4,963,000	43.7	53.6	2.7
1965	5,431,000	45.3	52.0	2.7
1970	5,926,000	46.0	51.3	2.7
1975	6,637,000	46.2	51.1	2.7
1980	7,638,000	46.5	50.8	2.7
1985	9,066,000	47.0	50.4	2.7
1990	10,335,000	47.5	49.9	2.6
1995	12,105,000	47.6	49.8	2.5
2000	13,926,000	47.7	49.9	2.5
2005	16,489,000	47.6	49.9	2.5
2010	19,082,000	46.6	50.9	2.5
2014	25,789,000	47.3	50.3	2.4
2020	32,522,339	47.8	49.9	2.3

Population by Sex and Age Group (Census 16.V.2014):

Age group	Male	Female	Total	%
Total	12 499 041	13 289 983	25 789 024	100
0–4	2 484 582	2 513 566	4 998 148	19.38
5–9	2 062 888	2 097 287	4 160 174	16.13
10–14	1 504 180	1 533 993	3 038 173	11.78
15–19	1 222 700	1 287 736	2 510 436	9.73
20–24	1 020 699	1 153 802	2 174 501	8.43
25–29	913 726	1 031 323	1 945 050	7.54
30–34	714 239	789 281	1 503 520	5.83
35–39	654 408	728 550	1 382 959	5.36
40–44	510 344	539 742	1 050 085	4.07
45–49	417 953	446 951	864 904	3.35
50–54	332 638	376 532	709 169	2.75
55–59	229 641	253 678	483 319	1.87
60–64	165 937	190 217	356 154	1.38
65–69	95 614	119 773	215 387	0.84
70–74	78 673	101 494	180 167	0.70
75–79	39 257	53 687	92 944	0.36
80–84	28 351	38 441	66 792	0.26
85–89	9 967	14 861	24 828	0.10
90–94	7 603	10 572	18 175	0.07
95+	5 640	8 498	14 138	0.05
Age group	Male	Female	Total	Percent
0–14	6 051 650	6 144 846	12 196 496	47.29
15–64	6 182 286	6 797 811	12 980 097	50.33
65+	265 105	347 326	612 431	2.37

Population Estimates by Sex and Age Group (01.VII.2020) (Post-censal estimates.):

Age group	Male	Female	Total	%
Total	15 168 180	15 959 494	31 127 674	100
0–4	2 499 013	2 501 045	5 000 058	16.06
5–9	2 486 762	2 525 617	5 012 379	16.10
10–14	2 109 413	2 147 502	4 256 915	13.68
15–19	1 646 467	1 703 593	3 350 060	10.76
20–24	1 324 586	1 389 321	2 713 907	8.72
25–29	1 080 096	1 160 339	2 240 435	7.20
30–34	893 015	978 811	1 871 826	6.01
35–39	743 420	828 169	1 571 589	5.05
40–44	618 724	692 419	1 311 143	4.21
45–49	503 305	556 808	1 060 113	3.41
50–54	401 888	445 257	847 145	2.72
55–59	304 199	343 355	647 554	2.08
60–64	222 814	258 393	481 207	1.55
65–69	148 455	180 188	328 643	1.06
70–74	93 883	119 433	213 316	0.69
75–79	53 235	71 070	124 305	0.40
80+	38 905	58 174	97 079	0.31
Age group	Male	Female	Total	Percent
0–14	7 095 188	7 174 164	14 269 352	45.84
15–64	7 738 514	8 356 465	16 094 979	51.71
65+	334 478	428 865	763 343	2.45

View source data.
View source data.
View source data.
View source data.

== Vital statistics ==
Registration of vital events in Angola is not complete. The website Our World in Data prepared the following estimates based on statistics from the Population Department of the United Nations.

	Mid-year population	Live births	Deaths	Natural change	Crude birth rate (per 1000)	Crude death rate (per 1000)	Natural change (per 1000)	Total fertility rate (TFR)	Infant mortality (per 1000 live births)	Life expectancy (in years)
1950	4,478,000	207,000	119,000	88,000	46.1	26.5	19.7	5.77	181.3	36.35
1951	4,570,000	212,000	122,000	91,000	46.5	26.7	19.8	5.83	180.9	36.39
1952	4,664,000	220,000	125,000	95,000	47.2	26.8	20.4	5.95	180.0	36.52
1953	4,759,000	227,000	128,000	100,000	47.8	26.8	21.0	6.06	179.1	36.73
1954	4,850,000	235,000	130,000	105,000	48.4	26.8	21.5	6.17	178.1	36.89
1955	4,938,000	242,000	133,000	109,000	48.9	26.8	22.0	6.27	177.0	37.12
1956	5,022,000	249,000	136,000	113,000	49.4	26.9	22.5	6.36	175.8	37.28
1957	5,104,000	256,000	138,000	118,000	49.9	26.9	23.0	6.46	174.6	37.50
1958	5,186,000	262,000	140,000	122,000	50.3	26.9	23.5	6.54	173.3	37.70
1959	5,270,000	268,000	142,000	127,000	50.7	26.8	24.0	6.63	171.9	37.97
1960	5,357,000	275,000	143,000	131,000	51.0	26.7	24.4	6.71	170.4	38.21
1961	5,441,000	280,000	150,000	130,000	51.3	27.5	23.8	6.79	168.9	37.27
1962	5,521,000	285,000	151,000	134,000	51.3	27.2	24.1	6.87	167.2	37.54
1963	5,600,000	289,000	152,000	137,000	51.3	26.9	24.4	6.95	165.5	37.82
1964	5,673,000	293,000	152,000	141,000	51.3	26.6	24.7	7.04	163.8	38.13
1965	5,737,000	296,000	151,000	145,000	51.3	26.2	25.1	7.12	161.9	38.50
1966	5,787,000	300,000	151,000	148,000	51.3	25.9	25.4	7.19	160.1	38.76
1967	5,828,000	302,000	151,000	151,000	51.3	25.6	25.7	7.27	158.1	39.09
1968	5,868,000	304,000	149,000	155,000	51.3	25.2	26.2	7.33	156.2	39.48
1969	5,928,000	307,000	148,000	158,000	51.4	24.8	26.5	7.39	154.3	39.83
1970	6,030,000	310,000	148,000	162,000	51.3	24.4	26.9	7.43	152.4	40.19
1971	6,177,000	313,000	148,000	165,000	50.7	23.9	26.8	7.47	150.5	40.55
1972	6,365,000	320,000	149,000	172,000	50.5	23.4	27.0	7.49	148.6	40.91
1973	6,578,000	331,000	151,000	180,000	50.5	23.0	27.5	7.50	146.8	41.27
1974	6,802,000	342,000	153,000	189,000	50.5	22.6	27.9	7.50	145.0	41.65
1975	7,033,000	354,000	161,000	194,000	50.5	22.9	27.6	7.49	144.6	41.19
1976	7,267,000	366,000	166,000	201,000	50.5	22.8	27.7	7.49	143.6	41.16
1977	7,512,000	378,000	169,000	209,000	50.5	22.6	28.0	7.48	142.0	41.44
1978	7,772,000	392,000	172,000	220,000	50.6	22.2	28.4	7.47	140.5	41.83
1979	8,043,000	407,000	176,000	231,000	50.7	21.9	28.8	7.46	139.1	42.18
1980	8,330,000	423,000	180,000	242,000	50.9	21.7	29.2	7.46	137.8	42.45
1981	8,631,000	440,000	185,000	255,000	51.1	21.5	29.6	7.46	136.5	42.77
1982	8,947,000	458,000	190,000	268,000	51.3	21.2	30.1	7.46	135.2	43.05
1983	9,277,000	477,000	203,000	274,000	51.6	22.0	29.6	7.46	136.1	42.09
1984	9,618,000	498,000	209,000	289,000	51.9	21.8	30.1	7.46	135.0	42.35
1985	9,971,000	519,000	215,000	304,000	52.1	21.6	30.6	7.45	134.0	42.65
1986	10,333,000	538,000	221,000	317,000	52.2	21.4	30.8	7.44	133.2	42.84
1987	10,694,000	557,000	245,000	312,000	52.1	22.9	29.2	7.41	136.5	40.92
1988	11,060,000	574,000	247,000	327,000	52.0	22.4	29.6	7.37	135.2	41.55
1989	11,439,000	590,000	253,000	337,000	51.7	22.2	29.5	7.33	134.8	41.77
1990	11,829,000	606,000	260,000	347,000	51.3	22.0	29.4	7.27	134.5	41.89
1991	12,229,000	622,000	250,000	372,000	50.9	20.5	30.5	7.21	131.1	43.81
1992	12,633,000	635,000	273,000	363,000	50.4	21.6	28.7	7.14	134.6	42.21
1993	13,038,000	650,000	279,000	371,000	49.9	21.4	28.5	7.07	131.2	42.10
1994	13,462,000	666,000	274,000	392,000	49.6	20.4	29.2	6.99	129.0	43.42
1995	13,912,000	683,000	262,000	422,000	49.2	18.8	30.4	6.92	128.6	45.85
1996	14,383,000	702,000	268,000	434,000	48.9	18.6	30.2	6.85	127.8	46.03
1997	14,871,000	719,000	273,000	446,000	48.4	18.4	30.0	6.79	126.5	46.31
1998	15,367,000	737,000	293,000	443,000	48.0	19.1	28.9	6.73	127.2	45.06
1999	15,871,000	757,000	296,000	461,000	47.8	18.7	29.1	6.68	123.7	45.39
2000	16,394,000	780,000	299,000	481,000	47.6	18.3	29.4	6.64	122.4	46.02
2001	16,942,000	805,000	301,000	504,000	47.6	17.8	29.8	6.60	118.5	46.59
2002	17,516,000	830,000	302,000	528,000	47.4	17.3	30.2	6.57	116.0	47.39
2003	18,124,000	855,000	286,000	569,000	47.2	15.8	31.4	6.53	110.0	49.62
2004	18,771,000	883,000	284,000	599,000	47.1	15.2	31.9	6.50	105.7	50.59
2005	19,451,000	912,000	282,000	630,000	46.9	14.5	32.4	6.46	101.1	51.57
2006	20,162,000	939,000	281,000	658,000	46.6	13.9	32.7	6.42	96.5	52.37
2007	20,910,000	966,000	274,000	692,000	46.3	13.1	33.2	6.37	91.4	53.64
2008	21,692,000	994,000	270,000	724,000	45.9	12.5	33.4	6.32	86.5	54.63
2009	22,508,000	1,022,000	265,000	758,000	45.5	11.8	33.7	6.26	81.8	55.75
2010	23,364,000	1,049,000	261,000	788,000	45.0	11.2	33.8	6.19	77.2	56.73
2011	24,259,000	1,074,000	257,000	817,000	44.4	10.6	33.7	6.12	73.0	57.60
2012	25,188,000	1,103,000	252,000	851,000	43.9	10.0	33.8	6.04	68.8	58.62
2013	26,147,000	1,130,000	251,000	879,000	43.3	9.6	33.7	5.95	65.2	59.31
2014	27,128,000	1,156,000	249,000	907,000	42.7	9.2	33.5	5.86	62.0	60.04
2015	28,128,000	1,181,000	248,000	933,000	42.0	8.8	33.2	5.77	59.4	60.66
2016	29,155,000	1,205,000	249,000	956,000	41.4	8.6	32.8	5.69	57.0	61.09
2017	30,209,000	1,231,000	249,000	983,000	40.8	8.2	32.6	5.60	54.9	61.68
2018	31,274,000	1,257,000	250,000	1,008,000	40.2	8.0	32.2	5.52	53.0	62.14
2019	32,354,000	1,284,000	253,000	1,032,000	39.7	7.8	31.9	5.44	51.3	62.45
2020	33,428,000	1,313,000	261,000	1,051,000	39.3	7.8	31.5	5.37	49.6	62.26
2021	34,504,000	1,339,000	276,000	1,063,000	38.8	8.0	30.8	5.30	48.1	61.64
2022	35,635,000	1,358,000	253,000	1,105,000	38.1	7.1	31.0	5.21	50.2	61.7
2023	36,750,000	1,381,000	254,000	1,127,000	37.6	6.9	30.7	5.12	48.6	62.1
2024					37.2	6.8	30.3	5.05		
2025					36.6	6.8	29.9	4.95		

=== Demographic and Health Surveys ===
Total Fertility Rate (TFR) (Wanted TFR) and Crude Birth Rate (CBR):

Year	Total		Urban		Rural	
Year	CBR	TFR	CBR	TFR	CBR	TFR
2006–2007	42.4	5.8	35.0	4.4	50.2	7.7
2011	45.5	6.3	36.5	4.6	51.8	7.7
2014 (census)		5.7		5.2		6.5
2015–16	43.4	6.2 (5.2)	40.6	5.3 (4.4)	48.4	8.2 (7.1)
2023–24	33.7	4.8 (3.9)	29.4	3.8 (2.9)	40.5	6.9 (5.9)

==== TFR before 1950 ====
Years	1900	1901	1902	1903	1904	1905	1906	1907	1908	1909
Total Fertility Rate in Angola	7.00	7.00	7.00	7.00	7.00	7.01	7.01	7.01	7.01	7.01

Years	1910	1911	1912	1913	1914	1915	1916	1917	1918	1919
Total Fertility Rate in Angola	7.01	7.01	7.01	7.01	7.01	7.01	7.01	7.01	7.01	7.02

Years	1920	1921	1922	1923	1924	1925	1926	1927	1928	1929
Total Fertility Rate in Angola	7.02	7.02	7.02	7.02	7.02	7.02	7.02	7.01	7.01	7.00

Years	1930	1931	1932	1933	1934	1935	1936	1937	1938	1939
Total Fertility Rate in Angola	7.00	7.00	6.99	6.99	6.99	6.98	6.98	6.97	6.97	6.97

Years	1940	1941	1942	1943	1944	1945	1946	1947	1948	1949
Total Fertility Rate in Angola	6.96	6.96	6.96	6.95	6.95	6.94	6.94	6.94	6.93	6.93

Development of life expectancy

== Ethnic groups ==
Ethnic groups of Angola 1970

Roughly 37% of Angolans are Ovimbundu, 25% are Ambundu, 13% are Bakongo, 7% are mestiço, 1-2% are white Africans, and people from other African ethnicities make up 17% of Angola's population. White Angolans are mainly of Portuguese descent.

Romani people were deported to Angola from Portugal during the colonial era.

== Languages ==
Portuguese is the official language of Angola, but Bantu and other African languages are also widely spoken. In fact, Kikongo, Kimbundu, Umbundu, Tuchokwe, Ganguela, and Ukanyama have the official status of "national languages". The mastery of Portuguese is widespread; in the cities the overwhelming majority are either fluent in Portuguese or have at least a reasonable working knowledge of this language; an increasing minority are native Portuguese speakers and have a poor, if any, knowledge of an African language.

== Religion ==
Angola is a majority Christian country. Official statistics do not exist, however it is estimated that over 80% belong to a Christian church or community. More than half are Catholic, the remaining ones comprising members of traditional Protestant churches as well as of Pentecostal communities. Only 0.1% are Muslims - generally immigrants from other African countries. Some insider news says that there is an unofficial ban on Islam in Angola. Traditional indigenous religions are practiced by a very small minority, generally in peripheral rural societies.
