= Nyemba =

Nyemba may refer to:

- Nyemba language, a Bantu language of Angola
- Ganguela people, or Nyemba, an ethnic group of Angola
- Ngiyampaa, or Nyemba, an ethnic group of Australia
- Nyemba River, a river in Democratic Republic of Congo, tributary of the Lukuga River
- Nico Nyemba, Zimbabwe rugby player

== See also ==
- Niemba, a town in the Democratic Republic of Congo
