= Demographics of the Republic of the Congo =

Demographics of Republic of the Congo
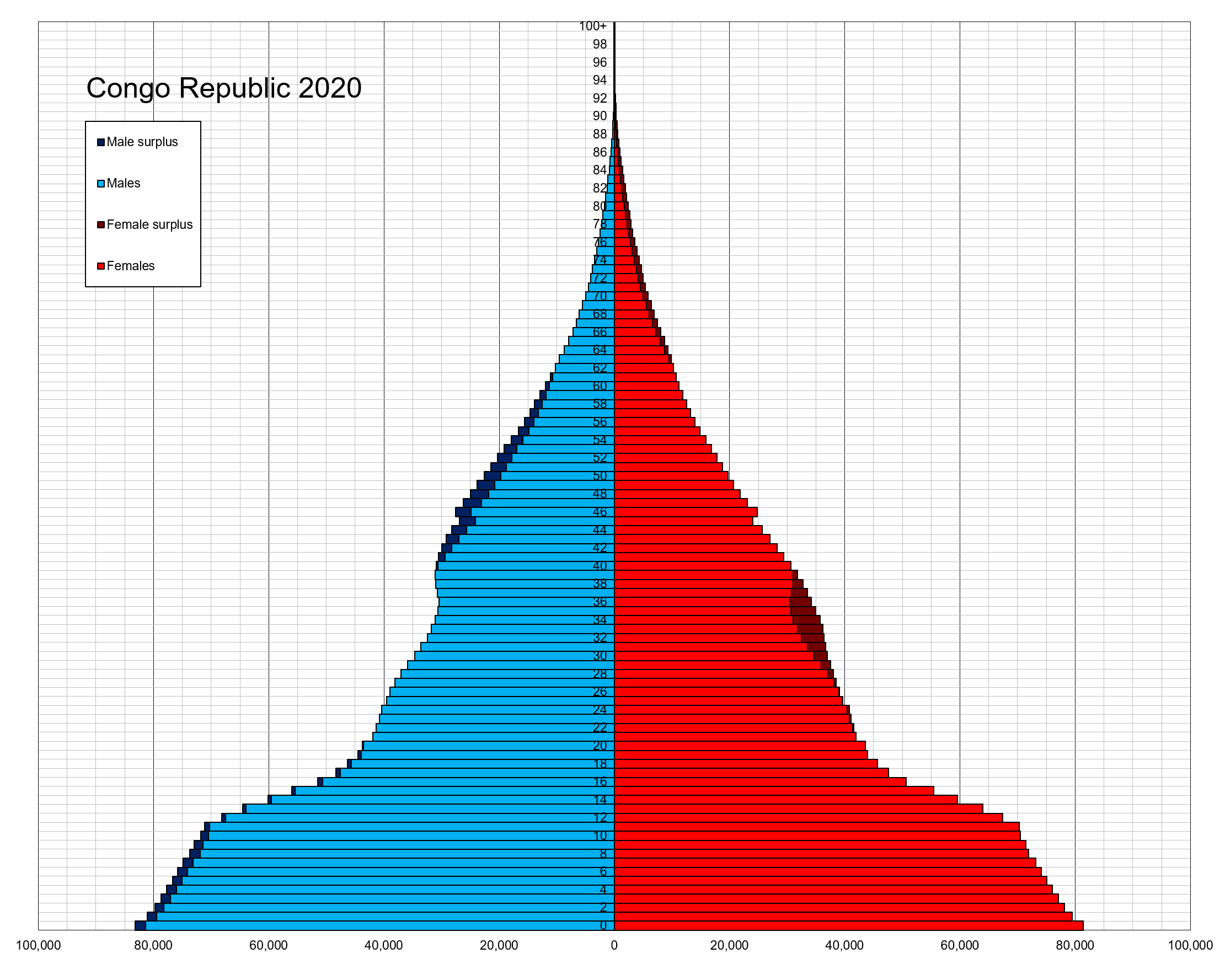
- Population pyramid of the Republic of the Congo in 2020
- Population: 5,835,806 (2021 est.)
- Growth rate: 2.34% (2022 est.)
- Birth rate: 31.82 births/1,000 population (2022 est.)
- Death rate: 8.38 deaths/1,000 population (2022 est.)
- Life expectancy: 62.1 years
  - male: 60.65 years
  - female: 63.61 years
- Fertility rate: 4.36 children born/woman (2022 est.)
- Infant mortality: 47.93 deaths/1,000 live births
- Net migration rate: 0 migrant(s)/1,000 population (2022 est.)

Age structure
- 0–14 years: 41.57%
- 65 and over: 3.2%

Sex ratio
- Total: 1.01 male(s)/female (2022 est.)
- At birth: 1.03 male(s)/female
- Under 15: 1.02 male(s)/female
- 65 and over: 0.66 male(s)/female

Nationality
- Nationality: Congolese

Language
- Official: French

Demographic features of the population of the Republic of the Congo include population density, ethnicity, education level, health of the populace, economic status, religious affiliations and other aspects of the population.

The Republic of the Congo's sparse population is concentrated in the southwestern portion of the country, leaving the vast areas of tropical jungle in the north virtually uninhabited. Thus, Congo is one of the most urbanized countries in Africa, with 85% of its total population living in a few urban areas, namely in Brazzaville, Pointe-Noire, or one of the small cities or villages lining the 534-kilometre (332 mi) railway which connects the two cities. In rural areas, industrial and commercial activity has declined rapidly in recent years, leaving rural economies dependent on the government for support and subsistence. Before the 1997 civil war, about 15,000 Europeans and other non-Africans lived in Congo, most of whom were French. Presently, only about 9,500 remain. Pygmies make up 2% of Congo's population.

== Population ==
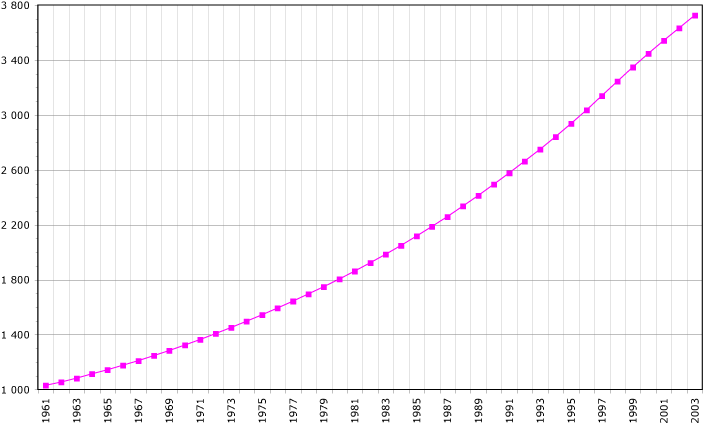
Population of the Republic of the Congo, Data of FAO, 2005

According to the 2022 revision of the World Population Prospects the total population was 5,835,806 in 2021, compared to only 808 000 in 1950. The proportion of children below the age of 15 in 2010 was 40.6%, 55.7% was between 15 and 65 years of age, while 3.7% was 65 years or older.

	Total population	Population aged 0–14 (%)	Population aged 15–64 (%)	Population aged 65+ (%)
1950	808 000	40.1	56.4	3.5
1955	899 000	40.5	55.9	3.6
1960	1 014 000	41.4	55.0	3.7
1965	1 158 000	42.5	53.7	3.8
1970	1 335 000	43.5	52.7	3.8
1975	1 555 000	44.2	52.0	3.8
1980	1 798 000	44.8	51.4	3.8
1985	2 081 000	44.6	51.7	3.7
1990	2 389 000	43.7	52.5	3.7
1995	2 733 000	42.5	53.7	3.7
2000	3 136 000	41.5	54.7	3.7
2005	3 533 000	41.3	55.0	3.7
2010	4 043 000	40.6	55.7	3.7

Republic of Congo Population and Housing Census
Year	Pop.	±% p.a.
1974	1,319,790	—
1984	1,909,248	+3.76%
2007	3,697,490	+2.92%
2023	6,142,180	+3.22%

Population estimates by sex and age group (01.VII.2009):

Age group	Male	Female	Total	%
Total	1 891 558	1 946 680	3 838 238	100
0–4	294 305	292 273	586 578	15.28
5–9	238 682	237 182	475 864	12.40
10–14	208 162	208 912	417 074	10.87
15–19	186 405	196 268	382 673	9.97
20–24	167 519	191 226	358 745	9.35
25–29	160 897	178 236	339 133	8.84
30–34	152 642	151 367	304 009	7.92
35–39	131 794	123 203	254 997	6.64
40–44	103 248	95 346	198 594	5.17
45–49	76 921	71 877	148 798	3.88
50–54	54 925	56 887	111 812	2.91
55–59	38 051	42 791	80 842	2.11
60–64	27 592	32 009	59 601	1.55
65-69	20 879	25 827	46 706	1.22
70-74	14 954	20 007	34 961	0.91
75-79	8 820	13 048	21 868	0.57
80+	5 762	10 221	15 983	0.42
Age group	Male	Female	Total	Percent
0–14	741 149	738 367	1 479 516	38.55
15–64	1 099 994	1 139 210	2 239 204	58.34
65+	50 415	69 103	119 518	3.11

Population estimates by sex and age group (01.VII.2020):

Age group	Male	Female	Total	%
Total	2 693 804	2 774 818	5 468 622	100
0–4	411 671	412 877	824 548	15.08
5–9	340 319	337 291	677 610	12.39
10–14	303 346	306 542	609 889	11.15
15–19	271 095	289 989	561 084	10.26
20–24	243 060	282 727	525 788	9.61
25–29	241 223	253 353	494 576	9.04
30–34	218 257	209 888	428 145	7.83
35–39	183 437	169 496	352 933	6.45
40–44	138 775	128 121	266 896	4.88
45–49	104 065	98 609	202 673	3.71
50–54	72 724	79 083	151 807	2.78
55–59	52 219	57 918	110 137	2.01
60–64	39 423	46 323	85 746	1.57
65-69	30 885	38 323	69 207	1.27
70-74	21 747	29 537	51 285	0.94
75-79	12 425	18 699	31 124	0.57
80-84	5 168	9 115	14 283	0.26
85+	3 964	6 928	10 891	0.20
Age group	Male	Female	Total	Percent
0–14	1 055 336	1 056 710	2 112 046	38.62
15–64	1 564 279	1 615 506	3 179 785	58.15
65+	74 189	102 602	176 791	3.23

== Vital statistics ==
Registration of vital events in the Republic of the Congo is incomplete. The Population Department of the United Nations prepared the following estimates.

Period	Mid-year population	Live births	Deaths	Natural change	CBR (Note: CBR = crude birth rate (per 1000); CDR = crude death rate (per 1000); NC = natural change (per 1000); TFR = total fertility rate (number of children per woman); IMR = infant mortality rate per 1000 births)	CDR	NC	TFR	IMR	Life expectancy (years)
1950	835,000	38,000	20,000	18,000	44.9	23.6	21.3	6.07	154.5	40.06
1951	853,000	38,000	20,000	18,000	44.8	23.2	21.6	6.07	151.2	40.65
1952	872,000	39,000	20,000	19,000	44.6	22.6	22.0	6.06	147.6	41.36
1953	892,000	40,000	20,000	20,000	44.5	22.0	22.5	6.06	143.7	42.16
1954	912,000	40,000	20,000	21,000	44.3	21.5	22.8	6.05	139.6	42.85
1955	933,000	41,000	19,000	22,000	44.2	20.8	23.3	6.07	135.3	43.65
1956	956,000	42,000	19,000	23,000	44.0	20.1	23.9	6.07	130.9	44.56
1957	979,000	43,000	19,000	24,000	43.8	19.5	24.4	6.07	126.4	45.43
1958	1,003,000	44,000	19,000	25,000	43.8	18.9	24.9	6.09	122.0	46.29
1959	1,029,000	45,000	19,000	26,000	43.6	18.2	25.4	6.09	117.7	47.12
1960	1,056,000	46,000	19,000	27,000	43.4	17.6	25.7	6.09	113.6	47.98
1961	1,083,000	47,000	19,000	28,000	43.2	17.1	26.1	6.09	109.9	48.70
1962	1,112,000	48,000	18,000	30,000	43.1	16.5	26.5	6.10	106.4	49.50
1963	1,143,000	49,000	18,000	31,000	43.2	16.1	27.1	6.15	103.2	50.12
1964	1,174,000	51,000	18,000	32,000	43.3	15.7	27.6	6.18	100.2	50.70
1965	1,207,000	52,000	19,000	34,000	43.5	15.4	28.1	6.23	97.4	51.20
1966	1,242,000	54,000	19,000	35,000	43.6	15.0	28.6	6.27	94.6	51.77
1967	1,278,000	56,000	19,000	37,000	43.6	14.8	28.9	6.29	92.3	52.10
1968	1,316,000	58,000	19,000	39,000	43.8	14.4	29.4	6.33	89.7	52.72
1969	1,356,000	59,000	19,000	40,000	43.9	14.1	29.8	6.35	87.4	53.20
1970	1,397,000	61,000	19,000	42,000	44.0	13.8	30.2	6.38	85.3	53.63
1971	1,440,000	64,000	19,000	44,000	44.2	13.5	30.7	6.42	83.3	54.04
1972	1,485,000	66,000	20,000	46,000	44.3	13.3	31.0	6.44	81.4	54.36
1973	1,532,000	68,000	20,000	48,000	44.1	13.0	31.0	6.42	79.6	54.70
1974	1,580,000	69,000	20,000	49,000	43.9	12.8	31.1	6.39	78.0	55.06
1975	1,625,000	71,000	20,000	51,000	43.7	12.6	31.1	6.36	76.4	55.32
1976	1,665,000	72,000	21,000	52,000	43.3	12.3	30.9	6.32	74.9	55.60
1977	1,706,000	73,000	21,000	53,000	42.9	12.2	30.7	6.27	73.5	55.81
1978	1,747,000	74,000	21,000	53,000	42.4	11.9	30.5	6.21	72.1	56.07
1979	1,788,000	75,000	21,000	54,000	41.9	11.7	30.2	6.14	70.6	56.31
1980	1,829,000	76,000	21,000	55,000	41.5	11.5	30.0	6.07	69.3	56.59
1981	1,871,000	77,000	21,000	56,000	41.2	11.2	29.9	5.98	67.9	56.83
1982	1,912,000	79,000	21,000	57,000	40.9	11.1	29.9	5.90	66.5	57.02
1983	1,952,000	80,000	21,000	59,000	40.8	10.9	29.9	5.81	65.1	57.23
1984	2,002,000	81,000	21,000	60,000	40.6	10.6	30.0	5.73	63.7	57.45
1985	2,063,000	83,000	22,000	61,000	40.3	10.6	29.7	5.65	62.3	57.52
1986	2,125,000	85,000	22,000	63,000	40.0	10.5	29.5	5.57	61.2	57.55
1987	2,189,000	87,000	23,000	64,000	39.8	10.5	29.2	5.49	60.4	57.43
1988	2,253,000	89,000	24,000	65,000	39.5	10.7	28.8	5.40	60.0	57.01
1989	2,319,000	91,000	25,000	66,000	39.2	10.9	28.3	5.31	60.0	56.51
1990	2,385,000	93,000	27,000	66,000	38.8	11.1	27.7	5.21	60.5	55.93
1991	2,453,000	95,000	28,000	67,000	38.7	11.5	27.2	5.16	61.4	55.24
1992	2,521,000	97,000	30,000	68,000	38.6	11.7	26.9	5.11	62.7	54.66
1993	2,594,000	100,000	31,000	68,000	38.4	12.0	26.4	5.06	64.4	54.15
1994	2,669,000	102,000	33,000	70,000	38.3	12.2	26.1	5.00	66.1	53.74
1995	2,742,000	105,000	34,000	71,000	38.2	12.3	25.9	4.97	68.1	53.64
1996	2,817,000	108,000	35,000	73,000	38.2	12.4	25.8	4.97	70.0	53.49
1997	2,875,000	110,000	47,000	64,000	38.3	16.2	22.1	4.96	75.1	47.19
1998	2,937,000	111,000	41,000	71,000	38.0	13.8	24.1	4.93	75.1	50.89
1999	3,017,000	114,000	38,000	75,000	37.7	12.7	25.0	4.85	74.0	52.76
2000	3,134,000	115,000	38,000	77,000	37.2	12.2	25.0	4.76	73.1	53.68
2001	3,254,000	122,000	39,000	84,000	37.6	11.8	25.8	4.71	71.4	54.40
2002	3,331,000	125,000	38,000	87,000	37.5	11.5	26.1	4.72	68.8	55.09
2003	3,425,000	127,000	37,000	90,000	37.3	11.0	26.3	4.70	65.6	55.95
2004	3,543,000	132,000	37,000	95,000	37.4	10.4	27.0	4.69	61.7	56.99
2005	3,673,000	137,000	36,000	101,000	37.4	9.8	27.5	4.66	57.8	58.13
2006	3,813,000	142,000	36,000	107,000	37.5	9.4	28.1	4.66	54.0	58.88
2007	3,956,000	148,000	36,000	113,000	37.7	9.1	28.6	4.67	50.7	59.64
2008	4,090,000	156,000	36,000	121,000	38.2	8.7	29.5	4.73	47.7	60.43
2009	4,257,000	162,000	35,000	127,000	38.4	8.4	30.0	4.79	45.3	61.09
2010	4,438,000	172,000	36,000	136,000	38.9	8.1	30.7	4.82	43.6	61.68
2011	4,584,000	175,000	36,000	139,000	38.2	7.9	30.3	4.79	42.1	61.99
2012	4,713,000	177,000	37,000	141,000	37.5	7.8	29.8	4.75	41.0	62.32
2013	4,828,000	177,000	36,000	140,000	36.5	7.5	29.0	4.69	40.0	62.70
2014	4,945,000	176,000	36,000	140,000	35.5	7.4	28.2	4.63	38.7	62.95
2015	5,064,000	176,000	37,000	139,000	34.6	7.2	27.5	4.56	37.6	63.23
2016	5,187,000	175,000	36,000	139,000	33.7	7.0	26.7	4.49	36.5	63.58
2017	5,312,000	176,000	37,000	139,000	33.0	6.9	26.1	4.43	35.4	63.76
2018	5,441,000	176,000	37,000	139,000	32.3	6.8	25.5	4.37	34.5	64.05
2019	5,571,000	177,000	41,000	135,000	31.7	7.4	24.3	4.30	35.4	62.75
2020	5,702,000	178,000	39,000	138,000	31.2	6.9	24.2	4.23	32.6	63.79
2021	5,892,000	185,000	41,000	140,000	31.4	6.9	23.7	4.28	30.7	64.2
2022	6,035,000	187,000	40,000	146,000	30.9	6.6	24.2	4.22	29.7	65.0
2023	6,183,000	189,000	39,000	149,000	30.6	6.3	24.2	4.16	28.8	65.8

Source: UN DESA, World Population Prospects, 2022

View source data.
View source data.
View source data.
View source data.

=== Demographic and Health Surveys ===
Total Fertility Rate (TFR) (Wanted Fertility Rate) and Crude Birth Rate (CBR):

Year	CBR (total)	TFR (total)	CBR (urban)	TFR (urban)	CBR (rural)	TFR (rural)
2005	40,0	4,8 (4,4)	34,6	3,8 (3,5)	46,1	6,1 (5,7)
2011-2012	41,4	5,1 (4,5)	40,6	4,5 (4,1)	42,8	6,5 (5,5)
2025	27.0	3.5	25.0	3.0	33.0	5.3

Fertility data as of 2011-2012 (DHS Program):

Department	Total fertility rate	Percentage of women age 15-49 currently pregnant	Mean number of children ever born to women age 40-49
Kouilou	6.8	11.4	6.2
Niari	5.9	11.9	5.4
Lékoumou	6.5	9.9	5.7
Bouenza	5.7	8.5	5.6
Pool	6.4	10.2	5.5
Plateaux	6.3	11.4	5.6
Cuvette	6.4	12.5	5.6
Cuvette-Ouest	6.0	10.1	6.1
Sangha	5.8	11.9	5.4
Likouala	7.0	11.7	6.4
Brazzaville	4.3	8.7	4.3
Pointe-Noire	4.6	9.2	4.5

== Ethnic groups ==
Kongo 40.5%, Teke 16.9%, Mbochi 13.1%, Sangha 5.6%, Europeans and other 23.9%

== Languages ==
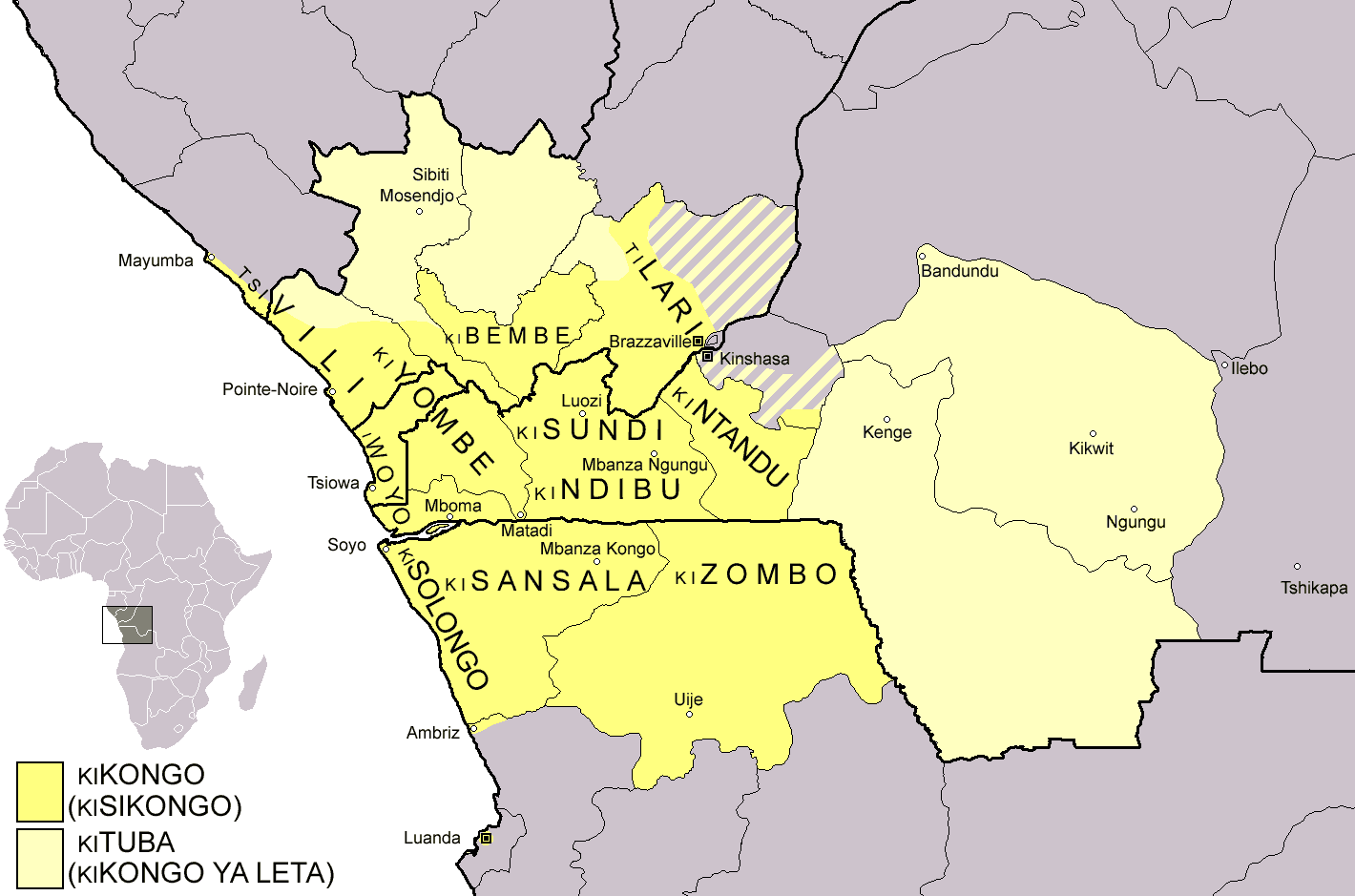
Kikongo/Kituba language area

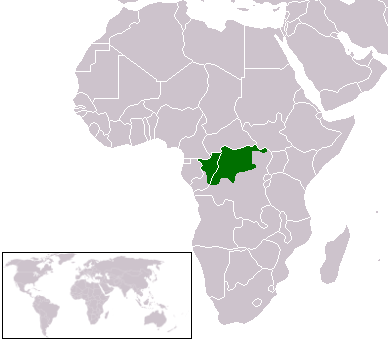
Lingala language area

Languages spoken here include French (official), Kituba or Monokutuba (lingua franca), Kongo or Kikongo, Lingala, and many local languages and dialects.

The majority of the population is concentrated along the railroad between Pointe-Noire and Brazzaville in the south where Kituba (a creole language based on Kikongo) is the primary language. Lingala is influential in the sparsely inhabited northern half of the country.

== Religion ==
Roman Catholic 33.1%, Awakening Churches/Christian Revival 22.3%, Protestant 19.9%, Salutiste 2.2%, Islam 1.6%, Kimbanguiste 1.5%, other 8.1%, none 11.3% (2010 est.)

== Health ==
Life expectancy for the population was estimated at 54.91 years in 2011: 53.62 for males and 56.25 for females. The adult prevalence rate for HIV/AIDS was 3.4% as of 2009, representing 77,000 people living with the disease and 5,100 deaths. The Republic of the Congo is considered to have a high degree of risk of infectious diseases, particularly bacterial diarrhea, hepatitis A and typhoid fever (all food- or waterborne), and malaria (vectorborne).

Period	Life expectancy in years
1950–1955	43.15
1955–1960	▲46.83
1960–1965	▲50.16
1965–1970	▲52.49
1970–1975	▲54.11
1975–1980	▲55.44
1980–1985	▲56.63
1985–1990	▲56.66
1990–1995	▼54.83
1995–2000	▼51.99
2000–2005	▲52.12
2005–2010	▲57.95
2010–2015	▲62.55
