= Matrilineal belt =

Area in south-central Africa where societies tend to be matrilineal

In anthropology, the matrilineal belt is an area in Africa south of the equator centered in south-central Africa where matrilineality is predominant. The matrilineal belt runs diagonally from the Atlantic to the Indian ocean, crossing Angola, Zambia, Malawi and Mozambique. The belt is linked to horticultural household economics, and Bantu groups that have embraced pastoralism have tended to lose matrilinearity.

Hypotheses linking the matrilineal belt to a supposed matrilineal Bantu expansion have been rejected as lacking evidence.

== See also ==
- Hajnal Line
