= Bafaw people =

Bantu people group

The Bafaw people are Bantus and live in Meme division of the South West Region of Cameroon. They make up 10 towns or villages, namely: Kokubuma, Kombone Bafaw, Dikomi, Kurume, Bolo, Ikiliwindi, Mambanda, Kumba, Dieka and Njanga each ruled by a chief known as “Nfon.”

The Bafaw Paramount chief was His Royal Highness Nfon Ekoko Mukete.

The Bafaw and the Bafaw language are related linguistically, culturally and historically to the Mbo, Bakossi, Belongs, Bassossi, Bakundu and Douala tribes.However the Bafo speak the Mbo mangen language as part of their heritage. Remember the Bafo originated from the Mbo mangen Clan ams not Ngoe as former writer S.N Ejedepang koge claim. The supposition of these Bafo people lies on their Province ces of movement. However a thorough research was done on this by the Bafo Historian Mende Ngoh who brought out clearly the Bafo roots in the mbo villages of Fessilaba, Humyumpe, Fotambong Kua, kumulumpe and others. The villages of Behmwe was named after a Bafo. The period of existence of Bafo within Mbo land indicate 1100 to 1300 A.D which signals a rich coexistence amongs several groups of people related to Ngen, the Mbo mythical Ancestor. The establishment of a rich Bafo foundation in kumba could justify periods as far as 1500.A.D when the first migrant set of Bafo moved from Mboland to former Kumba Division. With the Bafo out movement from Mbo land the pace of a niche became kumba Division with kumba being the new Tribal Capital. From description the term kumbè denotes umbrella trees which was symbolic with shelter For details about kumba see Mende Ngoh through Whatsapp: +237671062487. Most of the rich documented Bafo histories is to his credit.see also District Report kumba 1921 or Annual Report Cameroon Province 1933
