= Bantu expansion =

Postulated millennia-long series of migrations

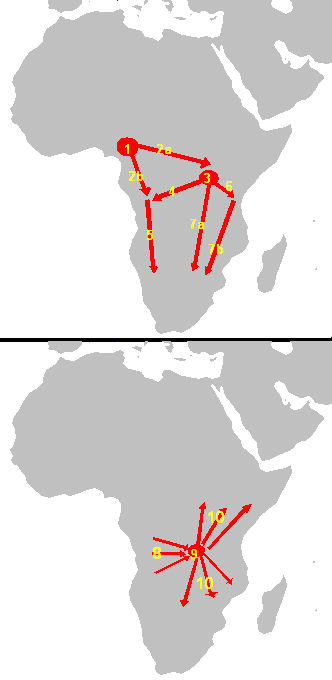
Chronological overview after Nurse and Philippson (2003): 1 = 4,000–3,500 BP: origin 2 = 3,500 BP: initial expansion "early split": 2.a = Eastern, 2.b = Western 3 = 2,000–1,500 BP: Urewe nucleus of Eastern Bantu 4–7: southward advance 9 = 2,500 BP: Congo nucleus 10 = 2,000–1,000 BP: last phase

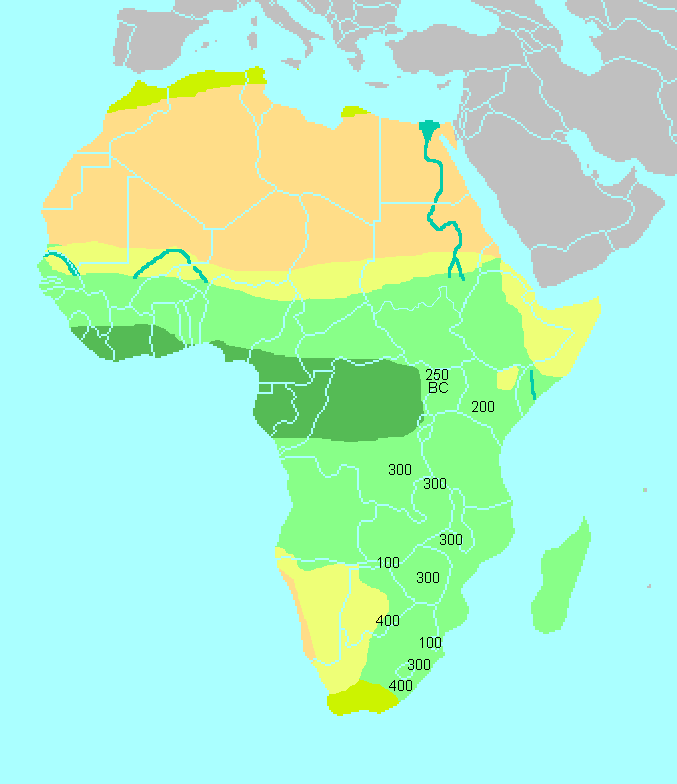
Map indicating the spread of the Early Iron Age across Africa; all numbers are AD dates except for the "250 BC" date.

The Bantu expansion was a major series of prehistoric migrations of the original Proto-Bantu-speaking group, which spread from an original nucleus around West-Central Africa across Central Africa, Eastern Africa, and Southern Africa. In the process, the Proto-Bantu-speaking settlers absorbed, displaced, and possibly in some cases replaced pre-existing hunter-gatherer and pastoralist groups that they encountered.

There is linguistic evidence for this expansion – a great many of the languages which are spoken across sub-Equatorial Africa are remarkably similar to each other, suggesting a recent common cultural origin of their original speakers. The linguistic core of the Bantu languages, which constitute a branch of the Atlantic-Congo language family, was located in north-western Cameroon to southern Nigeria. Genetic evidence also indicates that there was a large human migration from central Africa, with varying levels of admixture with local populations.

The expansion is believed to have taken place between about 6,000 and 1,500 years ago (approximately 4,000 BC to 500 AD). Linguistic analysis suggests that the expansion proceeded in two directions: the first (termed the "Western Stream") proceeded south either along the Atlantic coast or following rivers through the Congo rainforest, reaching central Angola around 500 BC. The second (termed the "Eastern Stream") proceeded east either along the northern fringe of the forest or along the Ubangi River, and reached west of Lake Victoria around 500 BC. From there, they split into two groups, with one heading west to regroup with the Western Stream, and the other dispersing over Eastern and Southern Africa. The expansion reached South Africa, probably as early as 300 AD.

== Theories on expansion ==
Bantuists believe that the Bantu expansion most likely began on the highlands between Cameroon and Nigeria. The 60,000-km^{2} Mambilla region straddling the borderlands here has been identified as containing remnants of "the Bantu who stayed home", as the bulk of Bantu-speakers moved away from the region. Archaeological evidence from the separate works of Jean Hurault (1979, 1986 and 1988) and Rigobert Tueché (2000) in the region indicates cultural continuity from 3000 BC until today. The majority of the groups of the Bamenda highlands (occupied for 2000 years until today), somewhat south and contiguous with the Mambilla region, have an ancient history of descent from the north in the direction of the Mambilla region.

Initially, archaeologists assumed that they could find archaeological similarities in the region's ancient cultures that the Bantu-speakers were held to have traversed. Linguists, classifying the languages and creating a genealogical table of relationships, thought they could reconstruct material culture elements. They presumed that the expansion was caused by the development of agriculture, the making of ceramics, and the use of iron, which permitted new ecological zones to be exploited. In 1966, Roland Oliver published an article presenting these correlations as a reasonable hypothesis. The hypothesized Bantu expansion pushed out or assimilated the hunter-forager proto-Khoisan, who had formerly inhabited Southern Africa. In Eastern and Southern Africa, Bantu speakers may have adopted livestock husbandry from other unrelated Cushitic-and Nilotic-speaking peoples they encountered. Herding practices reached the far south several centuries before Bantu-speaking migrants did. Archaeological, linguistic, genetic, and environmental evidence all support the conclusion that the Bantu expansion was a significant human migration. Generally, the movements of Bantu language-speaking peoples from the Cameroon/Nigeria border region throughout much of sub-Saharan Africa radically reshaped the genetic structure of the continent and led to extensive admixture between migrants and local populations. A 2023 genetic study of 1,487 Bantu speakers sampled from 143 populations across 14 African countries revealed that the expansion occurred ~4,000 years ago in Western Africa. The results showed that Bantu speakers received significant gene-flow from local groups in regions they expanded into.

The predominant paternal haplogroup among the Bantu is E1b1a1-M2. The ancestors of the Bantu originally came from Northeast Africa and moved around the Green Sahara. Based on dental evidence, Irish (2016) concluded that the common ancestors of West African and Proto-Bantu peoples may have originated in the western region of the Sahara, amid the Kiffian period at Gobero, and may have migrated southward, from the Sahara into various parts of West Africa (e.g., Benin, Cameroon, Ghana, Nigeria, Togo), as a result of desertification of the Green Sahara around 7000 BC. From Nigeria and Cameroon, agricultural Proto-Bantu peoples began to migrate, and amid migration, diverged into East Bantu peoples (e.g., Democratic Republic of Congo) and West Bantu peoples (e.g., Congo, Gabon) between 2500 BC and 1200 BC. He suggests that Igbo people and Yoruba people may have admixture from back-migrated Bantu peoples.

== Pre-expansion-era demography ==
Before the expansion of Bantu-speaking farmers, Central, Southern, and Southeast Africa were likely populated by Pygmy foragers, Khoisan-speaking hunter-gatherers, Nilo-Saharan-speaking herders, and Cushitic-speaking pastoralists.

=== Central Africa ===
It is thought that Central African Pygmies and Bantu speakers branched out from a common ancestral population c. 70,000 years ago. Many Batwa groups speak Bantu languages; however, a considerable portion of their vocabulary is not Bantu in origin. Much of this vocabulary is botanical, deals with honey collecting, or is otherwise specialised for the forest and is shared between western Batwa groups. It has been proposed that this is the remnant of an independent western Batwa (Mbenga or "Baaka") language.

=== Southeast Africa ===
Prior to the arrival of Bantu speakers in Southeast Africa, Cushitic-speaking peoples had migrated into the region from the Ethiopian Highlands and other more northerly areas. The first waves consisted of Southern Cushitic speakers, who settled around Lake Turkana and parts of Tanzania beginning around 5,000 years ago. Many centuries later, around 1000 AD, some Eastern Cushitic speakers also settled in northern and coastal Kenya.

Khoisan-speaking hunter-gatherers also inhabited Southeast Africa before the Bantu expansion.

Nilo-Saharan-speaking herder populations comprised a third group of the area's pre-Bantu expansion inhabitants.

=== Southern Africa ===
Before the Bantu expansion, Khoisan-speaking peoples inhabited Southern Africa. Their descendants have largely mixed with other peoples and adopted other languages. A few still live by foraging, often supplemented by working for neighbouring farmers in the arid regions around the Kalahari desert, while a larger number of Nama continue their traditional subsistence by raising livestock in Namibia and adjacent South Africa.

== History and development ==
The oldest pottery found in an area inhabited by Bantu speakers (Shum Laka in northern Cameroon) dates to 5000 BC. The Proto-Bantu speakers lived in villages and grew palm oil, nuts, grains, and possibly yams. They used stone tools, had goats and guinea fowl, and built boats used for fishing.

Despite intensive research, the cause of the Bantu expansion, and that of the directions taken, is still unclear, (Note: An initial idea that the dispersal was caused by population pressure following the introduction of farming is generally now discounted.) leading some scholars to think it began by accident. There is however consensus that there were multiple dispersal events.

=== c. 5000 BC to c. 500 AD ===
It is unclear whether the first dispersal scenario resulted in migration or multiple smaller dispersals occurring at different times. Although early models posited that the early speakers were both iron-using and agricultural, definitive archaeological evidence that they used iron does not appear until as late as 400 BC, though they were agricultural. The Bantu-speaking people split into two broad groups which dispersed in different directions, termed the "Western Stream" and the "Eastern Stream".

==== Western Stream ====
Sites south of Shum Laka (in southern Cameroon and Gabon) indicate the Western Stream began between 5000 and 3000 BC. Initial progress was very slow, and central Cameroon was only reached around 1500 BC. This slowness was due to the initial lack of iron tools which would have made clearing the forest considerably easier, and the Western Stream likely followed the coast and the major rivers of the Congo system southward. They may also have used the sea to reach the southern end of the rainforest. It is thought that the degradation of the West-Central African rainforest by climate change between 2000 BC and 500 BC aided the expansion. They reached the southern fringe of the forest by around 500 BC.

==== Eastern Stream ====
The Eastern Stream, thought to have started later than the Western Stream, dispersed east, possibly along the northern edge of the rainforest, or along the Ubangi River. Urewe pottery indicates they reached west of Lake Victoria by 500 BC. It was one of Africa's oldest iron-smelting centres. By the first century BC, Bantu speaking communities in the Great Lakes region developed iron forging techniques that enabled them to produce carbon steel.

Dispersal from the Great Lakes region occurred in two more streams. One went west to meet the Western Stream in the DR Congo and Angola, while the other went south and spread across Eastern and Southern Africa. Archaeological findings have shown that by 100 BC to 300 AD, Bantu speaking communities were present at the coastal areas of Misasa in Tanzania and Kwale in Kenya. These communities also integrated and intermarried with the communities already present at the coast. Other pioneering groups had reached modern KwaZulu-Natal in South Africa by 300 AD along the coast, and the modern Limpopo Province by 500 AD.

==== Interactions between Bantu speakers and hunter-gatherers ====
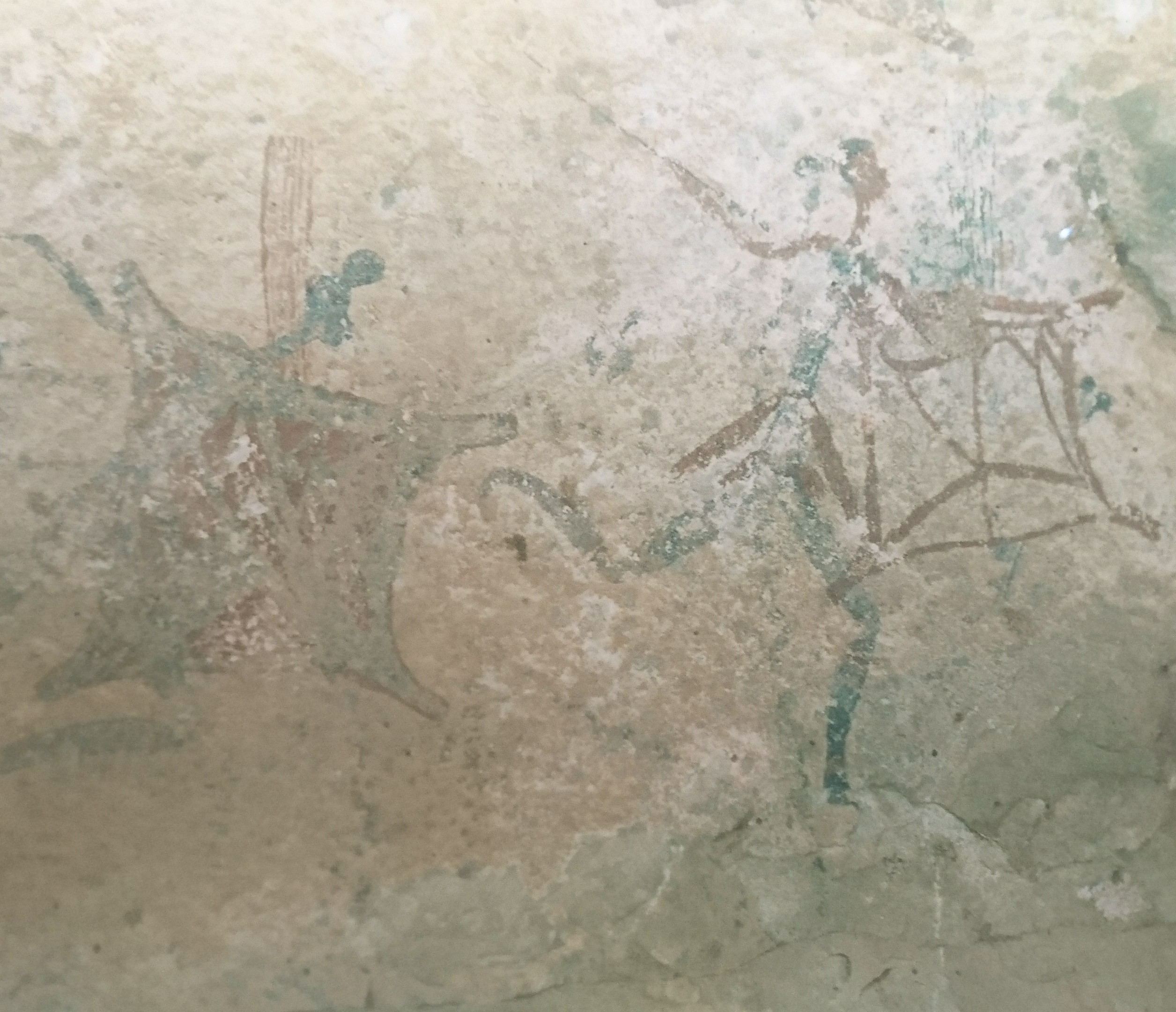
San rock art depicting a shield-carrying warrior. Interpreted to depict conflict with Nguni or Sotho warriors. One recent study of San art indicates that those termed as "contact paintings" could be religious in nature and express abstract conflict of varying natures.

Throughout the expansion, Bantu speakers interacted with various Pygmy groups and Khoisan speakers (hunter-gatherer groups), and Nilo-Saharan, Afro-Asiatic, and other Niger-Congo speakers (agricultural groups). Research indicates there was copious cultural and physical contact between Bantu speakers and hunter-gatherers, with intermarriages common. Relations were complex as languages, technologies, rituals, and genes were shared. The larger Bantu-speaking populations, aided by animal herding, would have often absorbed the smaller hunter-gatherer populations, with hunter-gatherer women migrating to Bantu-speaking groups, and Bantu-speaking men migrating to hunter-gatherer groups (this is supported by contemporary cultural customs that women from agricultural groups shouldn't marry men from foraging groups, while the reverse is more accepted (Note: One reason for this could be that the bride price for a hunter-gatherer woman is lower than for a Bantu-speaking woman.)). The use of click sounds (usually associated with Khoisan languages) in southern Bantu languages can be viewed as evidence of this. Oral traditions suggest displacement was sometimes the result of conflict. There is a lack of evidence for admixture in Angola, causing speculation of population replacement, however, there is not enough evidence to draw a conclusion.

== Criticism ==
Manfred K. H. Eggert stated that "the current archaeological record in the Central African rainforest is extremely spotty and consequently far from convincing so as to be taken as a reflection of a steady influx of Bantu speakers into the forest, let alone movement on a larger scale."

Seidensticker (2024) indicates that the prevalent paradigm for the Bantu expansion has a forced connection between Central African ceramics and Central African languages, where the geographic location of speakers of the Bantu languages is treated as synonymous with the geographic location of ceramic remnants; the popular approach of attempting to correlate linguistic reconstructions with archaeological data has resulted in propagation of the faulty presumption and circular reasoning that the earliest ceramic manufacturing in a given area is evidence for the earliest presence of Bantu-speakers. Within the fierce debate among linguists about the word "Bantu", Seidensticker (2024) indicates that there has been a 'profound conceptual trend in which a "purely technical [term] without any non-linguistic connotations was transformed into a designation referring indiscriminately to language, culture, society, and race'."

== See also ==
- Bantu peoples
- Matrilineal belt
- Pre-modern human migration
