= Xindonga =

Ethnological term

- Ethnic groups of Angola 1970 (Area of the Xindonga and neighbouring groups marked yellow)

Regions with significant populations
- Extreme Southeast Angola

Related ethnic groups
- Ovambo, Ganguela, San

Xindonga is an ethnological term created as a common label for four small ethnic groups existing in the extreme Southeast of Angola: the Cusso (Mbukushu), the Dilico (or Dirico), the Sambio and the Maxico. These peoples live in that region, which today is the Cuando Cubango Province, together with other small groups, belonging to the Ovambo, Ganguela and San. The "Xindonga" peoples are living on petty subsistence agriculture, keeping small animals, and the occasional hunting and/or fishing.
