= Urewe =

Culture of the African Iron Age

Coordinates: 0°02′51″S 34°20′15″E

Urewe culture
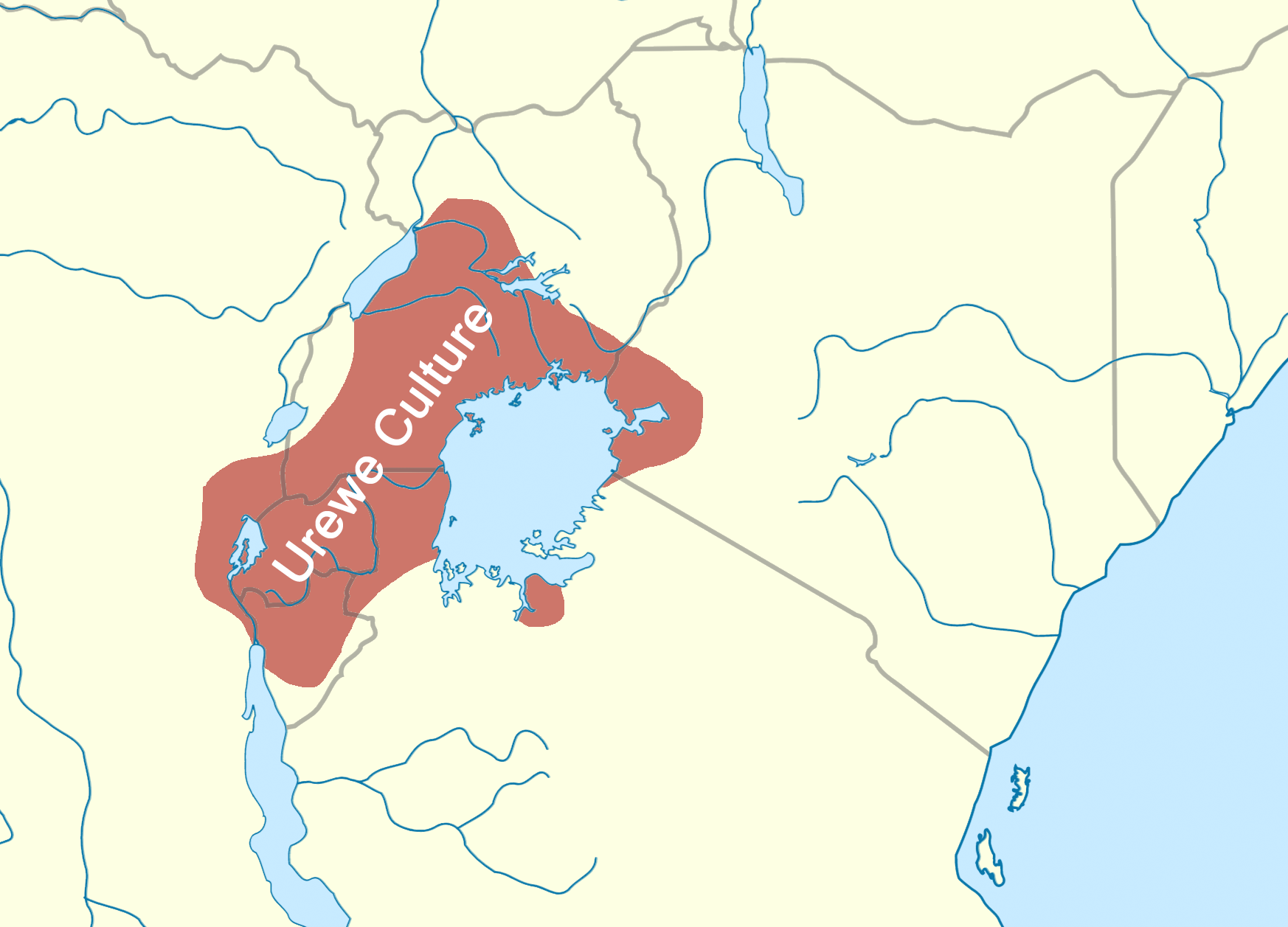
- Period: Iron Age
- Dates: c. 500 BC – 500s

The Urewe culture developed and spread in and around the Lake Victoria region of Africa during the African Iron Age. The culture's earliest dated artefacts are located in the Kagera Region of Tanzania, and it extended as far west as the Kivu region of the Democratic Republic of the Congo, as far east as the Nyanza and Western provinces of Kenya, north into Uganda, Rwanda and Burundi and south into Southern Africa. Sites from the Urewe culture date from the Early Iron Age, from the 5th century BC to the 6th century AD. The Urewe people certainly did not disappear, and the continuity of institutional life was never completely broken. One of the most striking things about the Early Iron Age pots and smelting furnaces is that some of them were discovered at sites that the local people still associate with royalty, and still more significant is the continuity of language.

== Chronology ==
This civilisation emerges in the region during the transition from the second to the first millennium B.C. and seems to have thrived in various sites well into the second millennium A.D. It underwent its greatest period of expansion, allied to an important metalworking activity, from the first to the sixth century A.D. and covered the Kivu region (in the Democratic Republic of the Congo) to the west up to Uganda, Rwanda, and Burundi in north-west Tanzania and south-west Kenya.

Urewe seems to be a fully developed civilisation recognizable through its distinctive, stylish earthenware and highly technical and sophisticated iron working techniques. Their pottery incorporated such distinctive features as dimples and concentric lines. However, minor local variations in the ceramic ware can be observed.

The origins of the Urewe culture are thought to ultimately be in the Bantu expansion originating in Cameroon. Research into early Iron Age civilisations in sub-Saharan Africa has been undertaken concurrently with studies on Niger–Congo linguistics on Bantu expansion. The Urewe culture may correspond to the Eastern subfamily of Bantu languages, spoken by the descendants of the first wave of Bantu peoples to settle East Africa. The inhabitants were likely cattle herders and millet and sorghum farmers.

The Urewe tradition has also been recognised as the first Iron Age community to reach Southern Africa, via the Kwale and Nkope branches. The Kwale branch is associated with areas along the eastern coast of Africa, particularly from Kenya down to KwaZulu-Natal in South Africa, while the Nkope branch is associated with a central stream extending from southern Tanzania through Malawi and eastern Zambia into Zimbabwe. Pioneers from the Kwale Branch reached the KwaZulu-Natal area between 200 and 300 AD, and evidence of the Nkope branch reaching the Limpopo Province dates to 400 AD.

== Language ==
The people of the Urewe Culture spoke the Proto-Great Lakes Bantu language.

== The Urewe civilisation in Burundi and Rwanda ==
Urewe ceramics are modest in size, measuring from 30 cm up to a maximum of 36 cm in height. Three distinct shapes have been observed: vases, small vases, both closed s-shaped pieces, open-bowls on which stereotyped patterns have been crafted: and bevelling on the rim, hatching on the neck surface for ease of handling, the body decorated with a ribboned pattern of crafted geometrical designs, and a dimple base finish. The decorative markings are adapted to and emphasise the shape of the vase with its 4 components, often seen on the little vase in simplified form. Conversely, these '4 component' patterns are all stuck on the bowl; regardless of its '3 components' shape. One proposed hypothesis suggests the bowl was developed later than the vase. Support for this comes from the identification, in terms of Bantu linguistics, of a new term first appearing around 1000 B.C. meaning "frying pan" probably serving as a clue to a change in cooking techniques reflecting adaptation to a more sedentary lifestyle when Bantu-speaking people began to settle in the Rwanda and Burundi hills.

The ironsmelting furnace associated to these Urewe ceramics comprised a basin filled with fresh green leafy branches and herbs which served as a filter for the slag deposit at the base. Above the basin was a cone-shaped shaft, not unlike a chimney, made by superimposing rolls of damp clay. The decorated furnace, with its fluted patterns on the upper roll and deeply incised criss-cross or s-shaped patterns on the outer surface, may be reminiscent of the rim or neck of the ceramic pottery. Analyses carried out on the ironworking residue have not yet provided data on the efficiency of these furnaces, or whether they were a measure of their technical nature. Iron ore and fuel were readily available. The word "ubutare" meaning "iron" still crops up in many place names. The wooded crown cover was used to produce charcoal. As new wood was always used for this purpose, radiocarbon dating of this material is relatively reliable.

== Favorable environments and changes due to climatic variations and human activity ==
Environmental studies combine the tree species identification of charcoal collected from iron smelting furnaces and open hearths, palynological analyses of high altitude and valley peat bogs as well as in archaeological structures as well as phyto-sociological and geomorphologic data. The settlement period of the Urewe civilisation should be seen in the context of a cooling and drying out period in about 1000 BC. Those members of the Urewe civilisation who settled in Rwanda and Burundi did so exclusively in the hills region (central plain) in a 1700 and 1300 meters high zone on clay soils on primary substrate which are some of Africa's richest. The undulating countryside, covered with woodland savanna (tree cover vegetation, sparser on the slopes and denser in valleys and on crests) together provided good living conditions (moderate temperatures and average rainfall, protected from carriers of human and animal disease) encouraged a variety of activities. The Urewe would have lived a relatively sedentary life as farmers, devoting themselves to agriculture (including cereal growing) and small-scale cattle rearing. They do not appear to have supplemented their diet by hunting and fishing as will be the case in these areas in the late Iron Age, and which occurred in the early Iron Age in those more east-lying Urewe civilisations around Lake Victoria, influenced perhaps by contacts with nomadic communities along the east African Rift Valley.

Combined human activities, land clearance, ironworking, cereal growing, etc., led to the deforestation of fringes of the great forest which once covered the north–south backbone as well as the forest corridors along the water sources which caused soil erosion on the slopes. This phenomenon led to the extensive erosion of Kabuye hill near Butare as a result of their occupation of the site for about 500 years.

The hilly region of Rwanda and Burundi was probably a well frequented route from the northern to the southern hemisphere in Africa and would therefore have regularly experienced the relative overcrowding of people fleeing the drought-ridden Sahel regions which impeded soil regeneration. On the contrary, the impact of human activity, combined with consecutive periods of hot, dry climatic conditions have only served to aggravate soil degradation up to modern times.

Since the 7th century, the appearance of simpler, roulette-decorated, ceramic pottery as well as new types of iron furnace, heralded a major change towards the late Iron Age. However, the Urewe civilisation did manage to survive in isolated pockets at least up to the 14th century.

== Archaeologists in the field area ==
The authors and major institutions linked to research into the Urewe civilisation in the Great Lakes region are: Mary Leakey (Owen collection published in 1948), Jean Hiernaux (excavations and publications 1960–70), Merrick Posnansky (excavations and publications 1960–70), David Phillipson (Synthesis of the Early Iron Age in Eastern Africa in 1976), the British Institute in Eastern Africa (BIEA), in Nairobi, under the aegis of J.E.G. Sutton (within the Bantu Studies Project, excavations and publications 1960–70), Peter Schmidt (excavations and publications 1970–80, synthesis 1997), Marie-Claude Van Grunderbeek, Emile Roche and Hugues Doutrelepont (excavations 1978–87, publications up to the present day). New on-site research is ongoing in the Great Lakes region on the initiative of London University in collaboration with the BIEA.

== See also ==
- Empire of Kitara
