= Luchazi =

Bantu language spoken in Angola and Zambia

- Ngangela, Lucazi
- Chiluchazi
- Native to: Angola, Zambia
- Native speakers: 431,000 (2010-2014)
- Language family: Niger–Congo?: Atlantic–Congo; Benue–Congo; Southern Bantoid; Bantu (Zone K); Chokwe–Luchazi (K.10); Luchazi

Official status
- Recognised minority language in: Angola (as "Nganguela" or "Ganguela")

Language codes
- ISO 639-3: lch – inclusive code Individual codes: lch – Luchazi nba – Nyemba (Ngangela) mfu – Mbwela
- Glottolog: luch1239 Luchazi nyem1238 Nyemba mbwe1238 Mbwela
- Guthrie code: K.13, K.12b, K.17

Luchazi (also called Lucazi or Chiluchazi) is a Bantu language of Angola and Zambia. Luchazi is the principal language of the Ngangela people. Ngangela is a term coined by the Vimbundu traders and missionaries in 18th century to describe the tribes occupying the area of eastern-central Angola.

== Distribution ==
Luchazi is spoken in eastern Angola, around the town of Muié. It is part of a dialect continuum that includes Nyemba, Mbunda, Ngonzela, and other dialects. Luchazi and Ngangela can also be used as blanket terms for all variants within the dialect continuum. Based on the similarities and differences across these dialects, it appears that Luchazi speakers migrated from their original settlements, explaining some geographically disparate connections to other dialects.

== Phonology ==
=== Consonants ===
The following table displays all the consonants in Luchazi:

		Labial	Alveolar	Palatal	Velar	Glottal
Nasal		m	n	ɲ	ŋ	
Plosive	voiceless	p	t tʲ^{1}		k	
Plosive	prenasalized	ᵐb	ⁿd		ᵑɡ	
Plosive	prenasalized asp.	ᵐpʰ	ⁿtʰ		ᵑkʰ	
Affricate	voiceless		t͡s	t͡ʃ		
Affricate	prenasalized		ⁿt͡s	ᶮt͡ʃ		
Affricate	prenasalized vd.		ⁿd͡z	ᶮd͡ʒ		
Fricative	voiceless	f	s	ʃ^{1}		h
Fricative	voiced	β	z	ʒ^{1}		ɦ
Approximant			l	j	w	

^1 Occur rarely, may only exist in loanwords.

The position of the speech-organs in producing the consonants is different from the positions taken in producing the similar sounds in European languages. T and D, for example, are lower than in English but higher than in Portuguese. L is flatter-tongued than in either English or Portuguese. The language contains many consonantal glides, including the prenasalized plosives and the voiceless alveolar sibilant affricate (the ts sound).

=== Vowels ===
	Front	Back
Close	ɪ iː	ʊ uː
Mid	ɛ ɛː	ɔ ɔː
Open	a aː	
Diphthongs	eɪ aɪ au ia ie io iu ua ue ui uo	

The close front vowel (i), when occurring before another vowel, becomes a semi-consonant and is written y, unless it is immediately preceded by a consonant, when it remains i. Examples: yange, viange.

The vowels have the Continental or Italian values. They are shorter when unstressed and are prolonged when doubled or when stressed at the end of a word.

- The vowel a is Long when accented, as a in tata, nana.

Short when unstressed or before two consonants or y or s and in monosyllabic adverbs, as a in tata, paya, asa, hanga. Prolonged when doubled or stressed at the end of a word or syllable. Example: ku laako.

- The vowel e is Long when accented, as a in heta, seza.

Short when unstressed, as a in hete, seze. Short with the value of e in henga, lenda before two consonants. Exceptions are hembo and membo (due to coalescence of vowels). Many words derived from Portuguese have the short vowel though not followed by two consonants. Examples: pena, papelo, luneta, ngehena, etc. Prolonged when stressed at the end of a word.

- The vowel i is Long when accented, as e in tina, sika.

Short when unstressed or before two consonants, as e in citi, linga. In monosyllabics it is short, as i in it. Examples: ni, ndi. Prolonged when stressed. Examples: ti, fui.

- The vowel o is Long when accented, as o in sota, koka.

Short when unstressed, as o in soko, loto. Short, with value of o in onga, yoya, kosa, luozi, ndo, before two consonants or y or s, and sometimes before z and in some monosyllables. The o is long in zoza and ngozi. Sometimes prolonged when stressed at the end of a word. Example: to.

- The vowel u is Long when accented, as u in tuta, fula.

Short, when unstressed or before two consonants or before s, as u in futuka, mbunga, kusa.

== Orthography ==
Luchazi is written using the Latin alphabet, with most characters representing the same sound as in English, with some exceptions. c is pronounced like ch in church, n followed by k or g is always nasal like ng in ring, the sound of v is bilabial instead of labiodental.

=== Alphabet ===
Majuscules
A	B	C	D	E	F	G	H	I	J	K	L	M	N	O	P	R	S	Sh	T	U	V	Y	Z
Minuscules
a	b	c	d	e	f	g	h	i	j	k	l	m	n	o	p	r	s	sh	t	u	v	y	z
Phonetic value
a/aː	b	t͡ʃ/t͡ʃʰ	d/d̪/ð	ɛ/e/ɛː	f	ɡ	h	ɪ/i/iː	d͡ʒ	k	l/ɭ	m	n	ɔ/o/ɔː	p	ɹ	s	ʃ	t/t̪/θ	ʊ/u/uː/w	β	j	z

B, D, G, J, R, and Sh only exist in loanwords.

=== Letter combinations ===
Multigraphs
ai	au	ei	ia	ie	io	iu	kh	mb	mp	nc	nd	ng	nj	nk	nt	ny	ph	th	ts	ua	ue	ui	uo
IPA
aɪ̯	aʊ̯	eɪ̯	i̯a	i̯e	i̯o	i̯u	kʰ	ᵐb	ᵐpʰ	ᶮt͡ʃʰ	ⁿd	ᵑɡ/ŋ	ᶮd͡ʒ	ᵑkʰ	ⁿtʰ	ɲi	pʰ	tʰ	tʲ~t͡s	u̯a	u̯e	u̯i	u̯o
