= Net migration rate =

Difference between the number of immigrants and emigrants divided by population

Net migration rates per 1,000 people in 2023

The net migration rate is the difference between the number of immigrants (people coming into an area) and the number of emigrants (people leaving an area) per year divided by the population. When the number of immigrants is larger than the number of emigrants, a positive net migration rate occurs. A positive net migration rate indicates that there are more people entering than leaving an area. When more emigrate from a country, the result is a negative net migration rate, meaning that more people are leaving than entering the area. When there is an equal number of immigrants and emigrants, the net migration rate is balanced.

The net migration rate is calculated over a one-year period using the mid year population and a ratio.

== Factors ==
Migration occurs over a series of different push and pull factors that revolve around social, political, economical, and environmental factors according to Migration Trends.

Social migration is when an individual migrates reunite with family members, or to live in an area or country with which they identify more with (i.e., moving to an area where one's ethnic group is the majority).

Political migration then is when a person is going in as a refugee to escape war or political persecution. In many cases, this form of migration can also be considered as forced migration. This happens when refugees are moving to neighboring countries or more developed countries.

Economic migration is when an individual migrates to attain a higher standard of living by having access to better economic opportunities.

Lastly, environmental migration is when natural disasters force one to move into a new area.

If a country has more immigrants than emigrants, it is often a relatively wealthier country that has comparatively more economic opportunities and a higher standard of living. On the other hand, if few people are coming in and many more are leaving, there is a higher possibility of violence, lower economic opportunities, or not enough resources to support the existing population in the country.

== Formula ==
A formula for calculating the net migration rate is:

N = (I - E) / M X 1,000

- N = Net migration rate
- I = Number of immigrants entering the area
- E = Number of emigrants leaving the area
- M = Mid-year population

=== Example ===
At the start of the year, country A had a population of 1,000,000. Throughout the year there was a total of 200,000 people that immigrated to (entered) country A, and 100,000 people that emigrated from (left) country A. Throughout the year there was a total of 100,000 births and 100,000 deaths. What is the net migration rate?

==== Step 1 ====
First, find the mid-year population for country A.

1. M = [ Population at Start of Year + Population at End of Year ] / 2
2. M = [ 1,000,000 + (1,000,000 + 200,000 - 100,000) ] / 2
3. M = [ 1,000,000 + 1,100,000 ] / 2
4. M = 2,100,000 / 2
5. M = 1,050,000

The mid-year population for country A is 1,050,000.

==== Step 2 ====
Second, find the net migration for country A. Note that this is simply the number of immigrants minus the number of emigrants, not the actual rate.

1. I - E = 200,000 - 100,000
2. I - E = 100,000

The net migration for country A is 100,000.

==== Step 3 ====
Third, substitute the result from step 2 into the formula to find the net migration rate for country A.

1. N = (I - E) / M X 1,000
2. N = 100,000 / 1,050,000 X 1,000
3. N = 95.23809523809524
4. N = 95.2

==== Result ====
The net migration rate for country A is 95.2 per 1,000 people. This means that for every 1,000 people in country A at the beginning of the year, the difference between the number of people moving in and the number of people moving out by the end of the year has a rate of 95.2 more people per 1,000 people. In essence this shows the change of population due to all migration flows, both in and out. This is helpful because the immigration rate shows growth only and emigration rate shows decline only. Combined net migration shows the impact of these two flows on the total population. This number shows the impact of migration on the country's population and allows for the comparison of country A's net migration rate to other country's net migration rate.

== Issues ==
If a country has a high net migration rate, it is generally relatively wealthier and more developed. In contrast, a country with a low rate is seen as undeveloped, having political problems, and lacking resources its citizens need.

Every country needs a stable number of people going in and out of its territory in order to have a stable economy. If the number of people coming in is greater than the number of people leaving, there will be a greater demand for resources and a tighter yet growing economy. On the other hand, a country with a lower migration rate will most likely lose many of its available resources due to a lack of consumerism and production.

Conflicts can arise due to migration, but people can still find it easier than ever to move to a different place. This can be due to more advanced technology and being able to communicate and have more efficient forms of transportation. All of this creates more opportunities which then increases the amount of net migration. The United States is an example of a country with growing opportunities as migration increases.

Other occurring problems caused by net migration is a rise in the dependency ratio, higher demand on government resources, and public congestion. A high dependency ratio can be a factor caused by net migration. The dependency ratio can increase as the elderly population proportionally increases, while the fertility rate decreases. This results in a decrease in the labor force, which can hurt a country's economy by causing it to slow down. In order to slow down this process, countries have various strategies, such as increasing the retirement age in order to keep the elderly involved in the workforce as much as possible.

== See also ==
- Demography
- Human migration
- List of sovereign states by net migration rate
- Population dynamics
