= Sangha people =

The Sangha (also known as Sanga) are an ethnic group in the northern Republic of the Congo. They make up 5.6% of the Congo's population, making them the fourth largest Congolese ethnic group.
