= Ganguela =

Ethnic group in Angola

Ethnic groups of Angola 1970 (The areas where "Ganguela" groups are dominant are marked green)

Ganguela (pronunciation: gang'ela) or Nganguela is the name of a small ethnic group living in Angola, but since colonial times the term has been applied to a number of peoples East of the Bié Plateau. In addition to the Nganguela proper, this ethnographic category includes the Lwena (Luena), the Luvale, the Mbunda, the Lwimbi, the Camachi and others. They speak the languages of the Ngangela-Nyemba subfamily, which include Luchazi, Nkangala and Nyemba.

All of these peoples live on subsistence agriculture, the rearing of small animals, and from gathering wild fruit, honey and other foods. Each group has its own language, although these are related among themselves. Each group also has its own social identity; there exists no overarching social identity encompassing them all, so that one cannot speak of these groups as one people divided into subgroups.

The peoples called "Ganguela" have been known to the Portuguese since the 17th century, when they became involved in the commercial activities developed by the colonial bridgeheads of Luanda and Benguela which existed at that time. On the one hand, many of the slaves bought by the Portuguese from African middlemen came from these people. On the other hand, in the 19th and early 20th century the "Ganguela" peoples furnished wax, honey, ivory and others good for the caravan trade organised by the Ovimbundu for the Portuguese in Benguela.

After the collapse of the caravan trade, the "Ganguela" were for long — in fact until the very end of the colonial period — of little interest for the Portuguese. This is why they were relatively late subjected to a colonial occupation to which — with the exception of the Mbunda — they offered near to no serious resistance.

During the few decades under colonial rule, their way of life changed less than in most other regions of Angola. As a rule, they were neither the object of systematic missionary work, nor subject to heavy tax levy or the recruitment as paid labour. The only important economic activity developed by the Portuguese in their area was the production of timber, for factories in Angola or in Portugal.

During the anti-colonial war, 1961–1974, and especially during the Civil War in Angola, some of these groups were affected to a greater or lesser degree, although their active involvement was rather limited. As a consequence, many took refuge in neighbouring Zambia and (to a lesser degree) Namibia. In particular, almost half of the Mbunda settled in Western Zambia, but this people maintains an overall cohesion through their traditional authorities both in Angola and Zambia.

== Bibliography ==
- Hermann Baumann: Die Völker Afrikas und ihre traditionellen Kulturen. Teil 1 Allgemeiner Teil und südliches Afrika, Steiner, Wiesbaden, 1975–1979
