= War of independence =

Conflict fought for independence

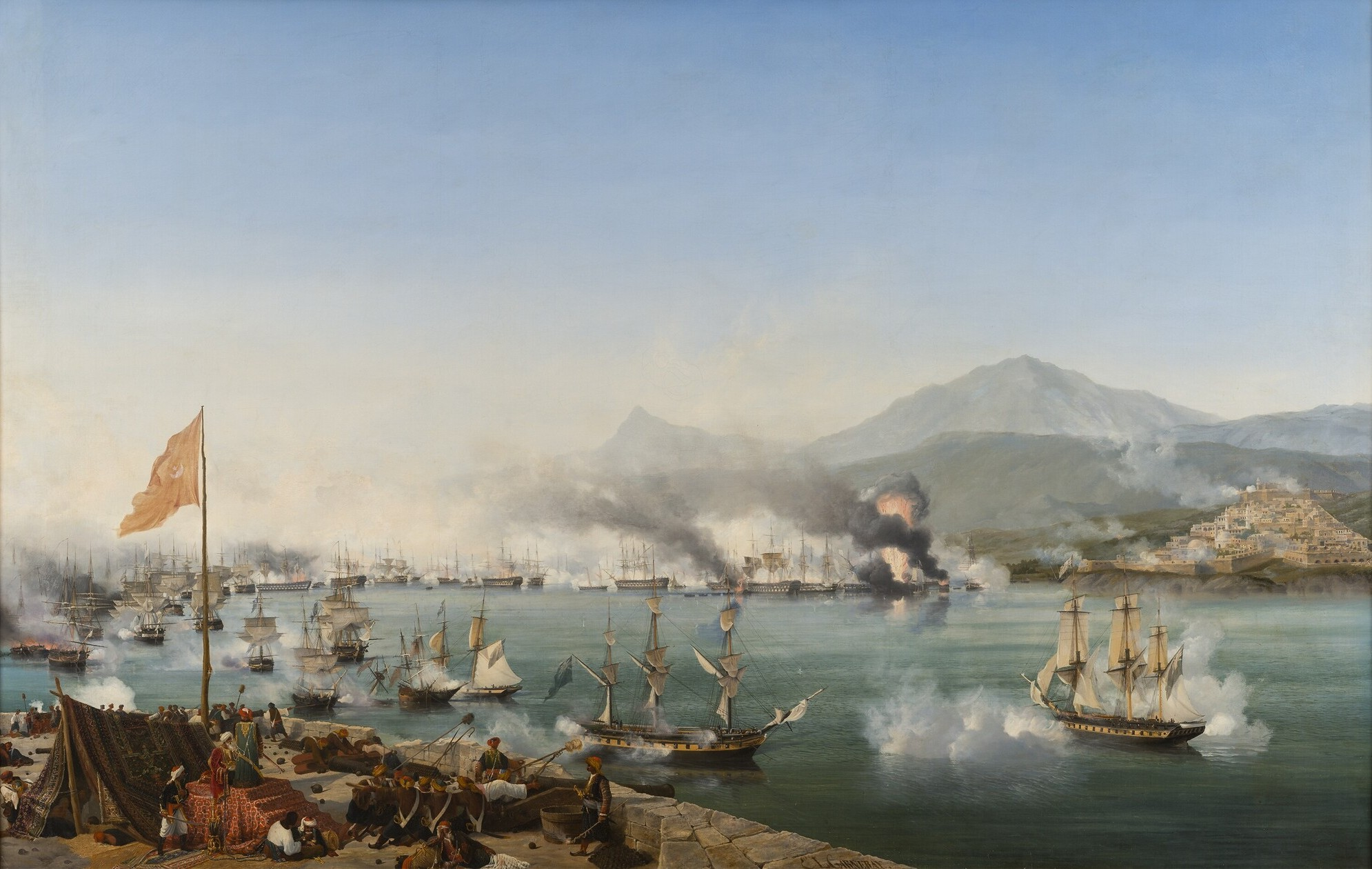
Allied naval intervention at the Battle of Navarino by Ambroise Louis Garneray, part of the Greek War of Independence against the Ottoman Empire

A war of independence, also called a war of national liberation or war of liberation, is a conflict fought by a nation to gain independence. The term is used in conjunction with a war against foreign powers (or at least one perceived as foreign) to establish a separate sovereign state for the rebelling nationality. From a different point of view, such a war is called an insurgency or a rebellion. Guerrilla warfare and terrorism is often utilized by groups labeled as national liberation movements, often with support from other states. The term "war of national liberation" is most commonly used for those fought during the decolonization movement. Since these were primarily in the third world, against Western powers and their economic influence, and a major aspect of the Cold War, the phrase has often been applied selectively to criticize the foreign power involved.

Some of these wars were either vocally or materially supported by the Soviet Union, which claimed to be an anti-imperialist power, supporting the replacement of Western-backed governments with local Communist or other non pro-Western parties. In January 1961 Soviet premier Nikita Khrushchev pledged support for "wars of national liberation" throughout the world. On the other hand, the Soviet involvement was often viewed as a way to increase the size and influence of the Soviet Bloc, and thus a form of imperialism itself. The People's Republic of China criticized the Soviet Union as being social imperialist. In turn, China presented themselves as models of independent nationalist development outside of Western influence, particularly as such posturing and other long-term hostility meant they were regarded as a threat to Western power and regarded themselves as such, using their resources to politically, economically and militarily assist movements such as in Vietnam. When the nation is defined in ethnic terms, wars fought to liberate it have often entailed ethnic cleansing or genocide in order to rid the claimed territory of other population groups.

== Legal issues ==
International law generally holds that a people with a legal right to self-determination are entitled to wage wars of national liberation. While Western states tend to view these wars as civil wars, Third World and communist states tend to view them as international wars. This difference in classification leads to varying perceptions of which laws of war apply in such situations. However, there is general agreement among all states today in principle that the use of force to frustrate a people's legal right to self-determination is unlawful.

== History ==
=== Decolonization period ===
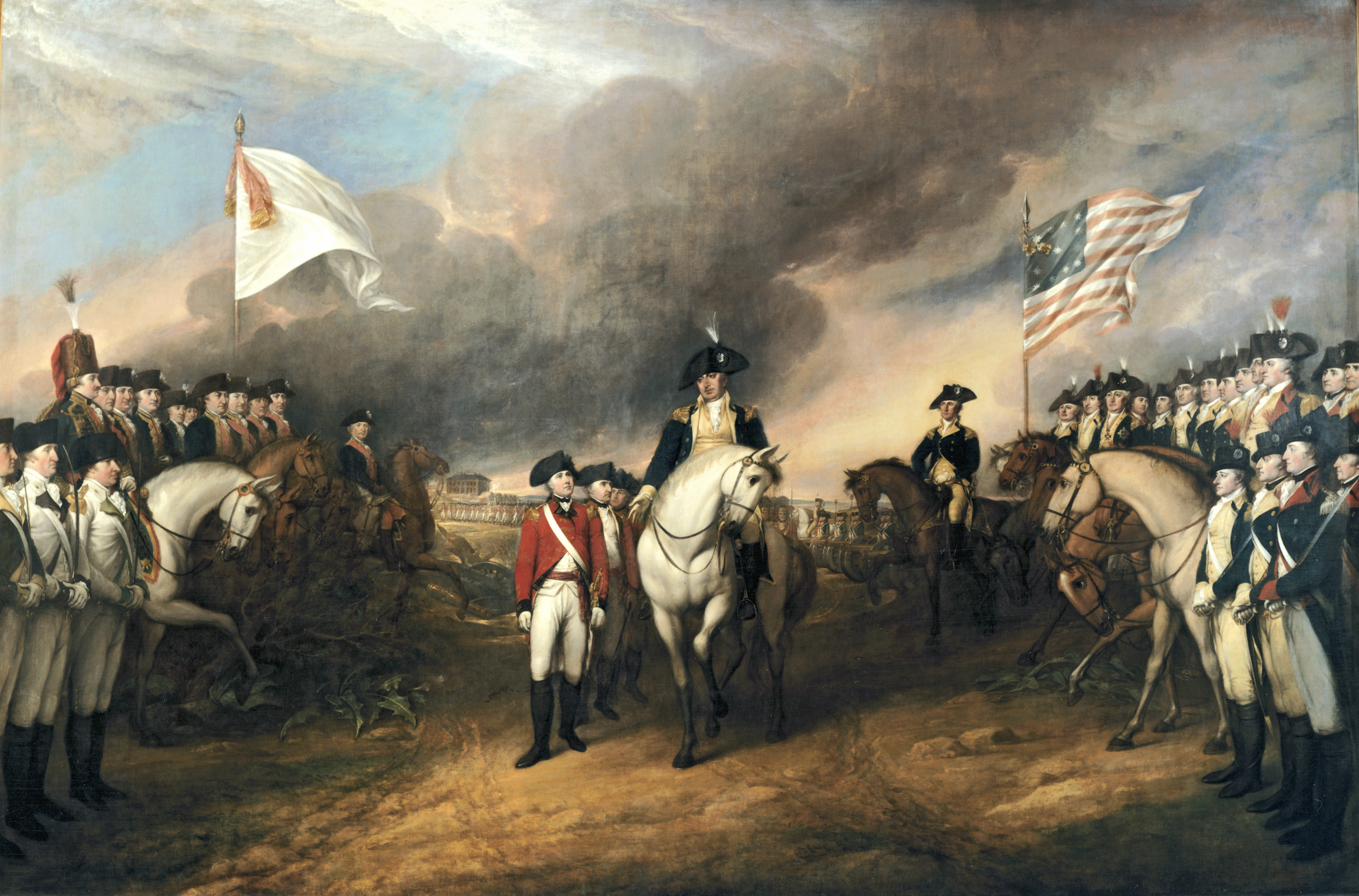
Surrender of Lord Cornwallis at Yorktown in 1781

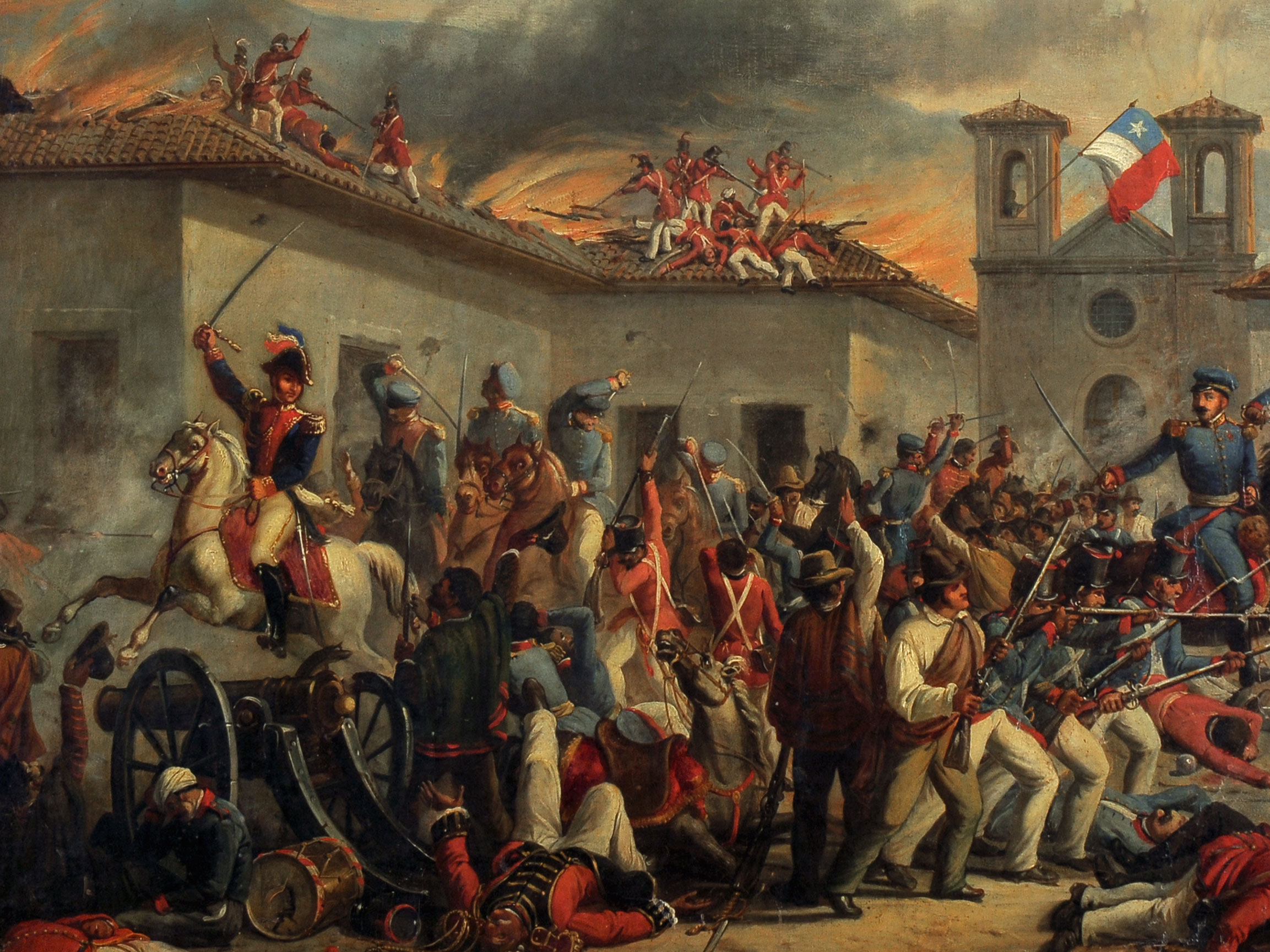
The Battle of Rancagua during the Chilean War of Independence in 1814

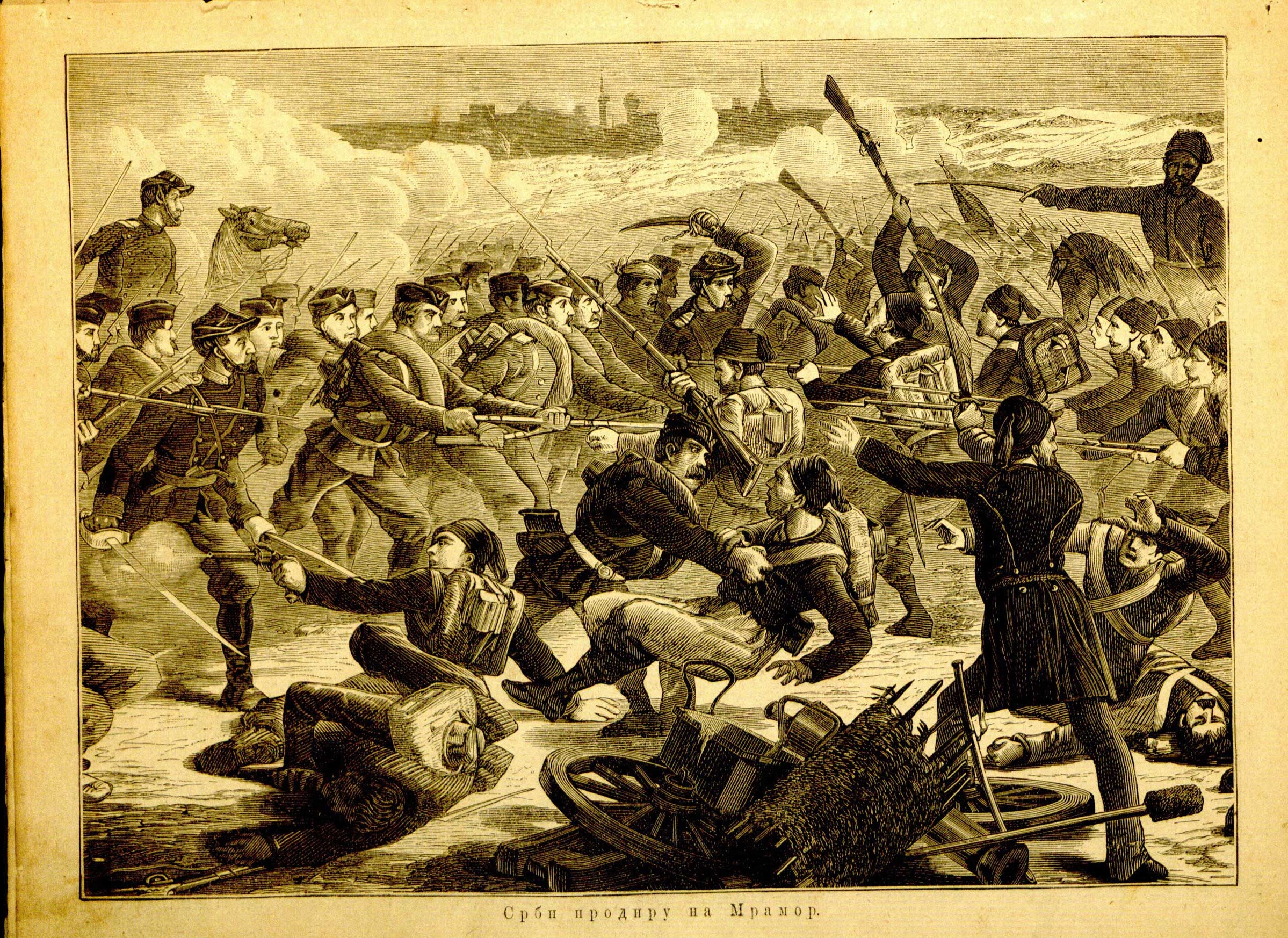
The Battle of Mramor between Serbian soldiers and the Ottoman army during the Serbian Wars for Independence in 1877

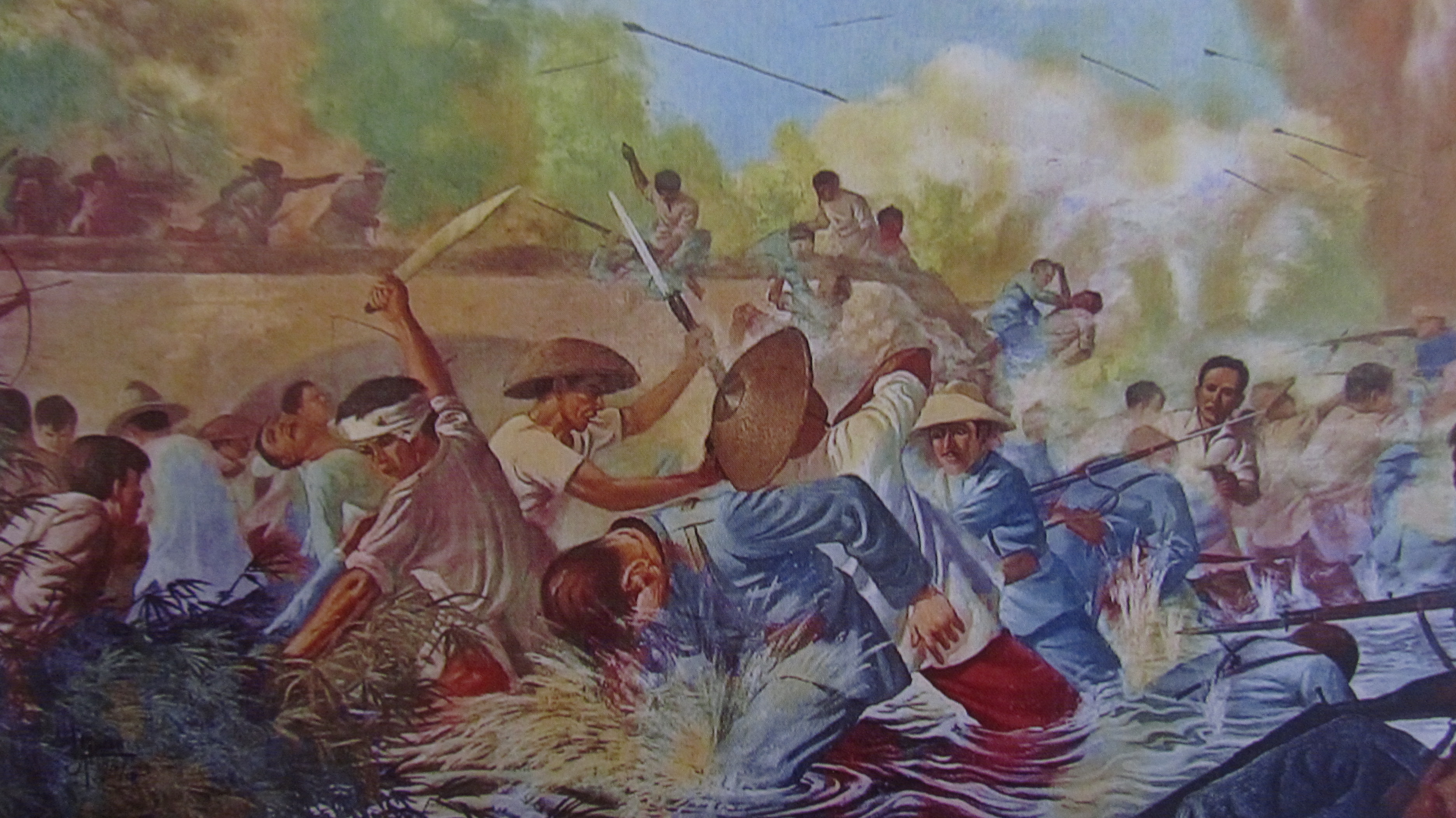
Battle of Zapote Bridge between Filipino revolutionaries and Spanish colonial forces during the Philippine Revolution in 1897

The Haitian Revolution (1791–1804) can be considered to be one of the first wars of national liberation. It pitted self-liberated slaves against Imperial France, coming about during a period in history where interconnected movements such as the American and French Revolutions had caused a rise of national consciousness in the Atlantic world. At the same time during the Spanish American wars of independence (1808–1833), the patriots launched a series of complex wars of independence against the royalists, which resulted in the formation of new Latin American states. The Siege of Patras (1821) led to the Greek War of Independence, ending Ottoman domination in the establishment of the Kingdom of Greece. Discontent with British company rule in India led to the Sepoy Mutiny (1857–1858), which is sometimes described as the First War of Indian Independence. (Note: "The events of 1857–58 in India (are) known variously as a mutiny, a revolt, a rebellion and the first war of independence (the debates over which only confirm just how contested imperial history can become) ... ")

The Easter Rising (1916) in Dublin eventually led to the Irish War of Independence (1919–1921), ending in the establishment of the Irish Free State. In the aftermath of World War I and the 1917 Russian Revolution the Bolsheviks unsuccessfully fought a number of independence movements until Finland, Estonia, Latvia, Lithuania, and Poland gained independence. The Ukrainian People's Republic fought its war of independence (1917–1921), which resulted in being absorbed into a Soviet republic. Following the defeat of the Ottoman Empire, the Turkish National Movement fought a series of campaigns in the war of independence (1919–1922), which resulted in the subsequent withdrawal of Allied forces and establishment of the Republic of Turkey.

The Indonesian War of Independence (1945–1949) followed with the Liberation of Irian Jaya (1960–1962), the First Indochina War (1946–1954), Vietnam War (1959–1975), Bangladesh Liberation War (1971) and the Algerian War (1954–1962) were all considered national liberation wars by the rebelling sides of the conflicts. The African National Congress (ANC)'s struggle against the apartheid regime is also another example. Most of these rebellions were in part supported by the Soviet Union. Since the Russian Revolution the revolutionary objectives of communism and socialism were shared by many anticolonialist leaders, thus explaining the objective alliance between anticolonialist forces and Marxism. The concept of "imperialism" itself had been theorized in Lenin's 1916 book, Imperialism, the Highest Stage of Capitalism. For example, Ho Chi Minh — who founded the Viet-Minh in 1941 and declared the independence of Vietnam on September 2, 1945, following the 1945 August Revolution — was a founding member of the French Communist Party (PCF) in 1921. In January 1961, over three years before the Gulf of Tonkin incident which would mark the United States government's increased involvement in the Vietnam War, Soviet premier Nikita Khrushchev would pledge support for "wars of national liberation" throughout the world. In the same decade, Cuba, led by Fidel Castro, would support national liberation movements in Angola and Mozambique.

The Portuguese colonial wars finally led to the recognition of Angola, Mozambique and Guinea-Bissau as independent states in 1975, following the April Carnation Revolution. The Rhodesian Bush War became a scene of guerrilla warfare and terrorism by factors of the ZANLA and ZAPU against Rhodesia until white-majority rule came to an end in 1979 and the Lancaster House Agreement led to the independence of Zimbabwe in April 1980. In February 1991, six months after the outbreak of the Gulf War, the coalition led by the United States launched a ground offensive to liberate Kuwait from Iraqi occupation. The 1991 breakup of Yugoslavia led to fewer wars of independence in part of the Yugoslav Wars, including the Ten-Day War and the Croatian War of Independence. The aftermath of the Rwandan genocide saw the AFDL invade Zaire, overthrowing the regime of Mobutu and reverting its name to the Democratic Republic of the Congo. In the first Libyan Civil War (2011), an uprising developed into a rebellion, toppling the regime of Muammar Gaddafi and the National Transitional Council declared the liberation of Libya from 42 years of his rule.

== Ongoing wars defined as national liberation conflicts ==
The Palestine Liberation Organization (PLO) is a national liberation movement, meaning that it holds official recognition of its legal status as such. Other national liberation movements in the OAU at that time included the African National Congress (ANC) and Pan Africanist Congress of Azania (PAC). It is the only non-African national liberation movement to hold observer status in the OAU, and was one of the first national liberation movements granted permanent observer status by the United Nations General Assembly pursuant to a 1974 resolution. The PLO also participates in UN Security Council debates; since 1988, it has represented the Palestinian people at the UN under the name "Palestine".

The Polisario Front has sought the independence of Western Sahara since 1973 and considers its war against Morocco as a national liberation war, as do many foreign observers, countries and the African Union. The Polisario Front has been recognized by the United Nations as the legitimate representative of the Sahrawi people. The hostilities were frozen after a 1991 cease-fire and settlement plan agreement that called for a referendum on self-determination. However, the referendum was never held and hostilities resumed in 2020.

The following current conflicts have sometimes also been characterized as wars or struggles of national liberation (such a designation is often subject to controversy):

- Many Chechens and foreign observers consider the First and Second Chechen Wars to be wars of national liberation against Russia.
- Some Iraqi insurgent groups, and certain political groups believe that the Iraq War was a war of national liberation against the US-led coalition.
- Many Kurds believe the Kurdish–Turkish conflict to be a war of national liberation of Kurdish people in Turkey.

== Conflicts ==
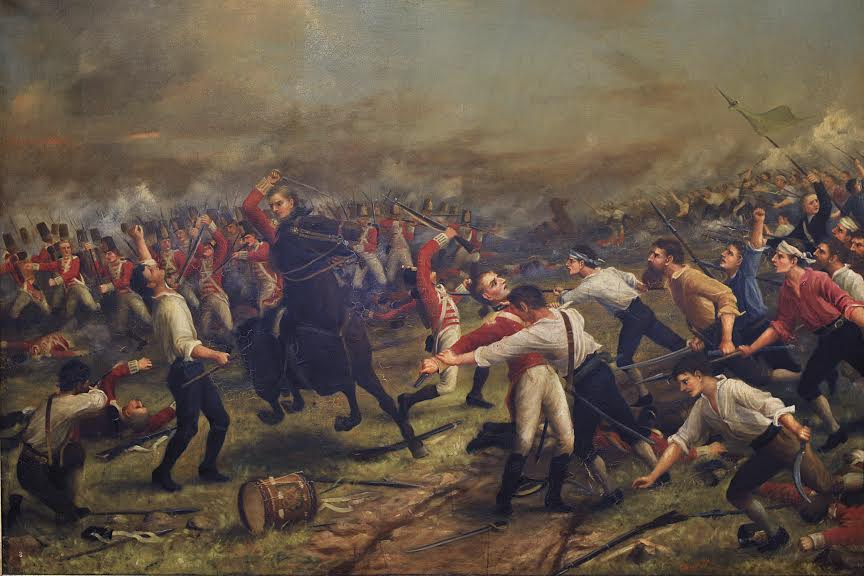
Irish Rebellion of 1798

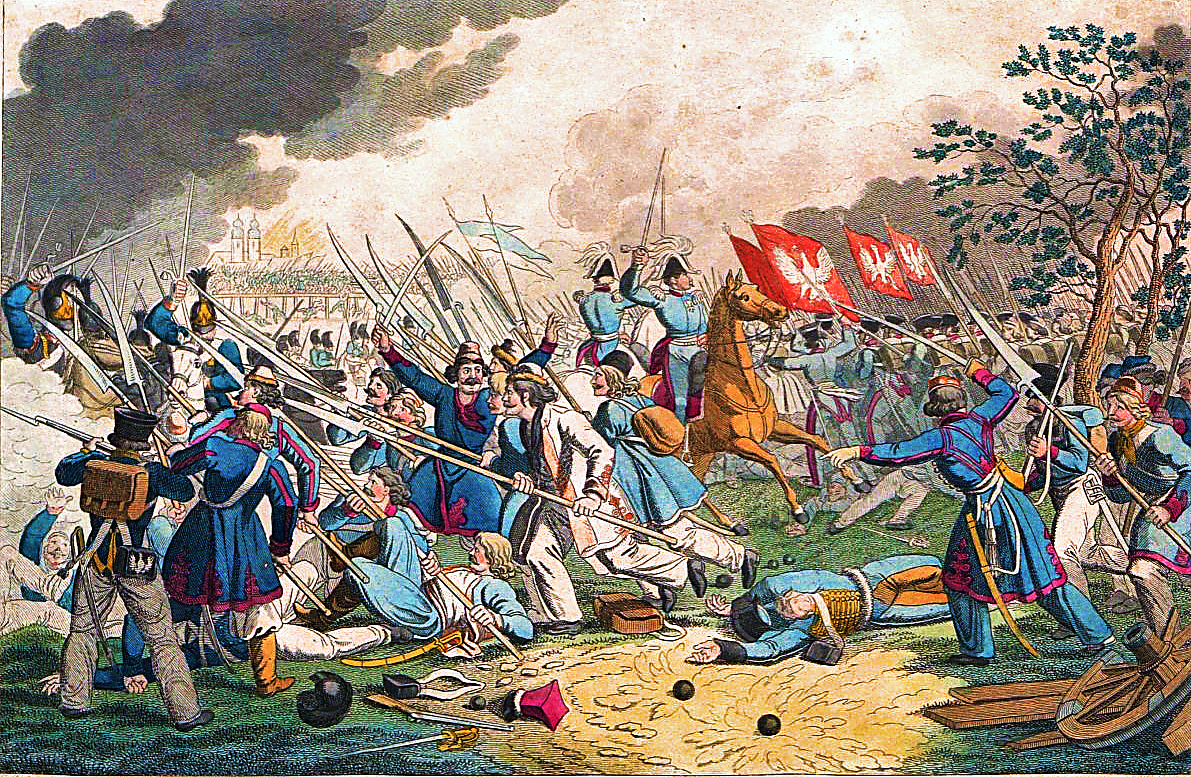
Battle of Ostrołęka during the November Uprising

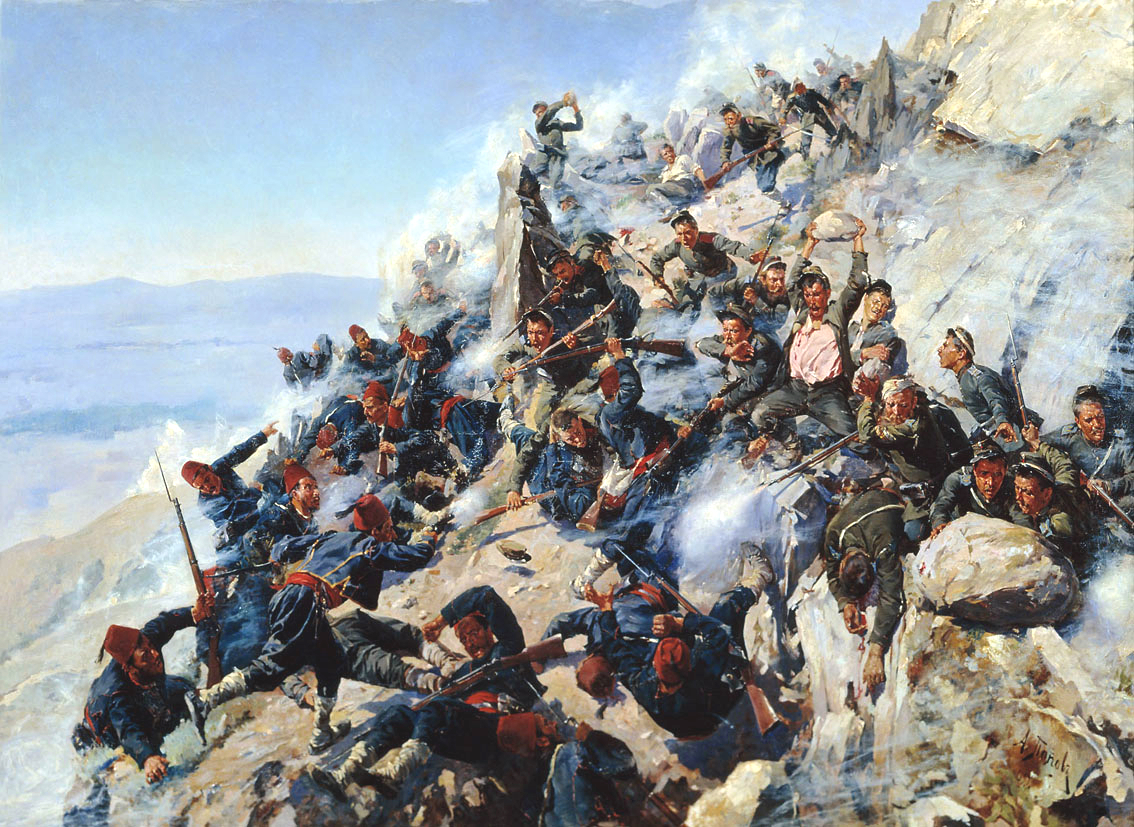
Defence of Shipka Pass against Turkish troops was crucial for the independence of Bulgaria

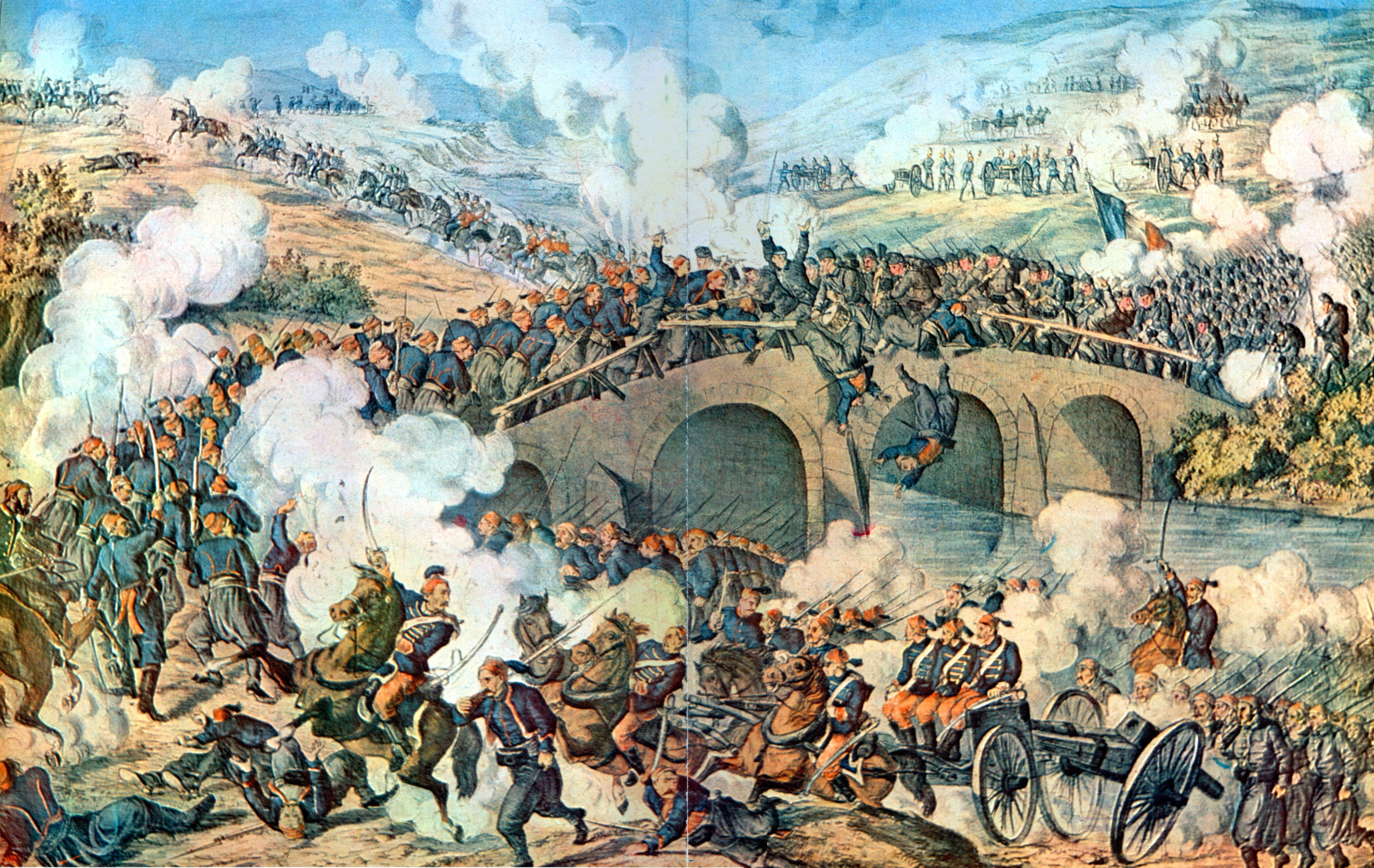
Clash between Turks and Romanians during the Romanian War of Independence in 1877

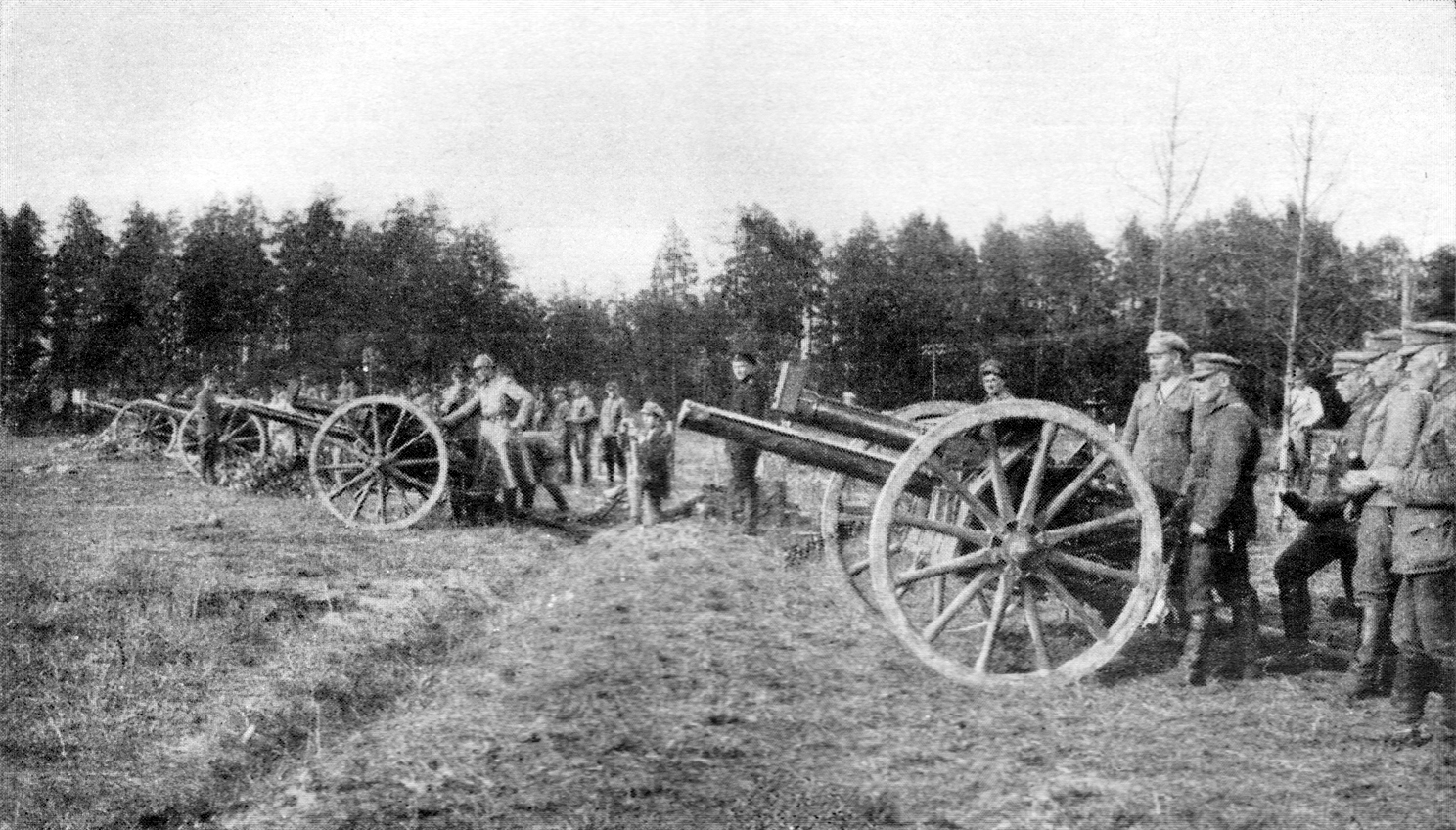
Estonian artillery preparing for a battle during the 1918–1920 Estonian War of Independence

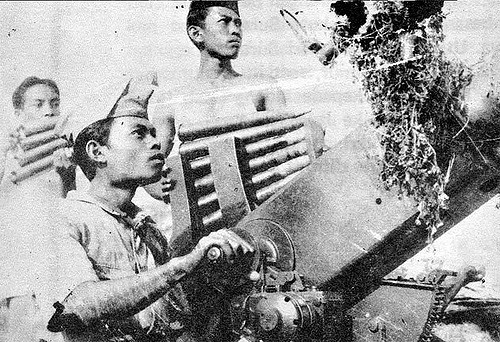
Indonesian pemuda (youth) operating an AA weapon during the Indonesian National Revolution

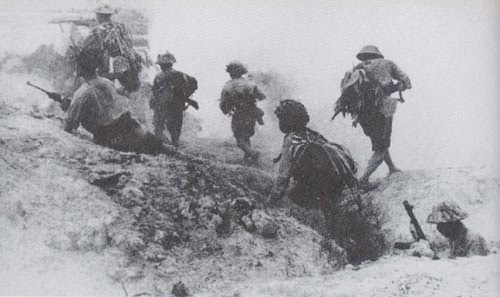
Viet Minh soldiers launching an assault during the Battle of Dien Bien Phu

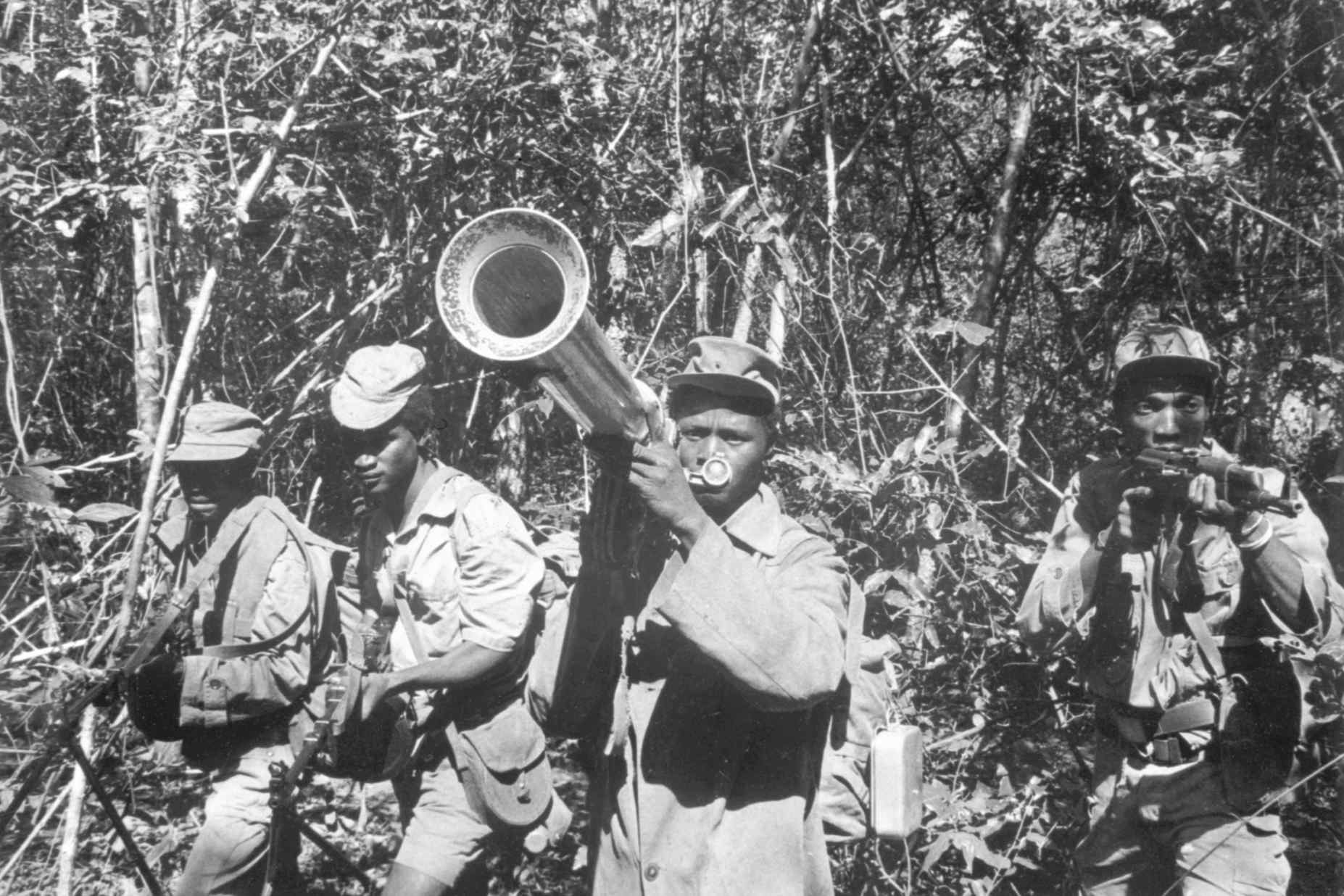
PAIGC guerrillas with rocket launchers and submachineguns during the Guinea-Bissau War of Independence, 1970

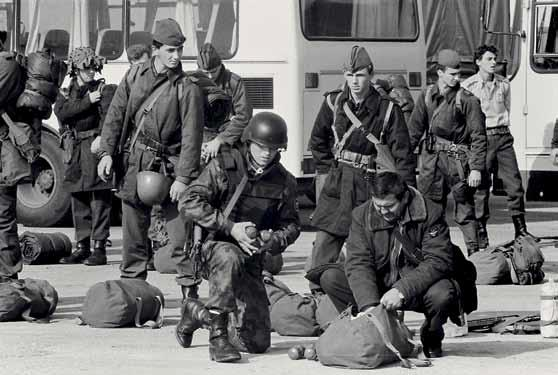
Slovenian military member (front left) supervising Yugoslav personnel before departure at the end of the Ten-Day War

Conflicts which have been described as national liberation struggles:

- The Swedish War of Liberation (1521–1523).
- The Eighty Years' War.
- The Khmelnytsky Uprising.
- The War of the Catalans.
- The American Revolutionary War.
- The Irish Rebellion of 1798.
- The Irish Rebellion of 1803.
- The Peninsular War against Napoleon's occupation of Spain and Portugal during the Napoleonic Wars.
- The Haitian Revolution.
- The German campaign of 1813 against Napoleon's occupation of German lands during the Napoleonic Wars.
- The Spanish American wars of independence.
- The Swedish-Norwegian War.
- The Greek War of Independence (1821).
- The Belgian Revolution.
- The Serbian Revolution.
- The Dominican War of Independence (1844–1856).
- The Hungarian Revolution of 1848 (1848–1849).
- The Italian Wars of Independence (1848–1866)
- The Dominican Restoration War (1863–1865).
- The Serbian–Turkish Wars (1876–1878).
- The Portuguese Restoration War
- Explicit wars of decolonization:
  - The Philippine Revolution and the Philippine-American War
  - The Rif War against the Spanish protectorate in Morocco
  - The Indonesian National Revolution
  - The Tamil resistance to Sri Lankan colonization in Tamil-speaking territories and discrimination against the Tamil people.
  - The Malagasy Uprising against French colonial rule in 1947.
  - The Algerian War against France (1954–1962).
  - The Portuguese Overseas War in Angola, Guinea-Bissau, and Mozambique against Portugal (1961–1974).
  - In Cameroon, by the UPC against France.
  - In South Yemen by the National Liberation Front (NLF) and the Front for the Liberation of Occupied South Yemen (FLOSY).
  - The Mau Mau Rebellion against British rule in Kenya.
  - The Rhodesian Bush War in white-ruled Rhodesia (now Zimbabwe), led by ZANU and ZAPU.
  - In Western Sahara, by the Moroccan Army of Liberation against Spain and France, and by the Polisario Front against Moroccan and Mauritanian occupation.
  - In Namibia, by the South West Africa People's Organization (SWAPO) and SWANU against apartheid South Africa.
  - The Dhofar Rebellion in Muscat and Oman.
  - The Dervish War in Somalia.
  - The Brunei Revolt.
- The Estonian War of Independence.
- The Latvian War of Independence.
- The Lithuanian Wars of Independence.
- The Ukrainian War of Independence.
- The Turkish War of Independence.
- The First Indochina War, by the Viet Minh against the French Union
- The National Liberation War in Yugoslavia, within World War II, by the Yugoslav Partisans against the occupation of the Axis powers and their collaborators.
- The Italian Civil War in which forces of the Kingdom of Italy and the Italian resistance movement fought against occupying forces of Nazi Germany and forces of the Italian Social Republic during the Italian campaign of World War II.
- In China, the Chinese Civil War (1945–1949).
- In North Korea, the Korean War against South Korea.
- The Vietnam War, with South Vietnam and the United States against North Vietnam, China, and the Soviet Union.
- The Eritrean War of Independence against Ethiopia.
- The Bangladesh Liberation War against West Pakistan.
- The Soviet-Afghan War against the occupying Soviet Army.
- In Ireland, the Anglo-Irish War and The Troubles in Northern Ireland; also, the Provisional IRA insurgency against the United Kingdom, aimed at creating a socialist republic within a united Ireland, from 1969 until 1998.
- In Cambodia, the Coalition Government of Democratic Kampuchea against the occupying Vietnamese Army and the People's Republic of Kampuchea during the later stage of the Cambodian–Vietnamese War.
- The Western Sahara War
- The Ogaden War of 1977 with Somalia against Ethiopia
- In Nicaragua, by Augusto Sandino's forces against the occupying U.S. Marines.
- In Chad, by FROLINAT against the Tombalbaye dictatorship
- In South Africa, against the apartheid regime by Umkhonto we Sizwe and Azanian People's Liberation Army.
- The Armenian-led Karabakh Movement in the Nagorno-Karabakh conflict
- In Bougainville, by the Bougainville Revolutionary Army against Papua New Guinea
- The Chiapas conflict by the Zapatista Army of National Liberation against Mexico has been considered a national liberation movement.
- The Croatian War of Independence
- The Ten-Day War
- The Bosnian War
- The First and Second Chechen Wars, by the Chechen peoples against Russia
- The Iraq War, by the Iraqi resistance against the United States
- The South Sudanese wars of independence, the first from 1955 to 1972, and the second from 1983 to 2005, ultimately culminating in the 2011 independence of South Sudan from Sudan.

== See also ==
- African independence movements
- American War of Independence
- Clausewitz's On War
- Colonialism and chronology of colonialism
- Decolonization of the Americas
- Fourteen Points, especially V and XII
- Hukbalahap
- Insurgency and counter-insurgency
- List of wars of independence
- List of active autonomist and secessionist movements
- List of active separatist movements recognized by intergovernmental organizations
- List of decolonized nations
- List of historical separatist movements
- List of sovereign states by date of formation
- List of states with limited recognition
- Minzu jiefang
- Separatism
- Stateless nation

== Bibliography ==
- Boleslaw Adam Boczek (2005). International law: a dictionary. Scarecrow Press. p. 86. ISBN 978-0-8108-5078-1.
- Malanczuk, Peter Autor (1997). Akehurst's Modern Introduction to International Law. Routledge. ISBN 978-0-415-11120-1.
- Mitchell, Thomas G. (2000). Native vs. settler: ethnic conflict in Israel/Palestine, Northern Ireland, and South Africa (Illustrated ed.). Greenwood Publishing Group. ISBN 978-0-313-31357-8.
- Richard H. Shultz (1988). The Soviet Union and revolutionary warfare: principles, practices, and regional comparisons. Hoover Press. ISBN 978-0-8179-8711-4.
- Wilson, Heather A. (1990). International law and the use of force by national liberation movements (Illustrated ed.). Oxford University Press. ISBN 978-0-19-825662-5.
