= Chronology of Western colonialism =

This is a non-exhaustive chronology of colonialism-related events, which may reflect political events, cultural events, and important global events that have influenced colonization and decolonization.

== Before the 15th century ==
- 334 B.C Granicus River: Alexander the Great of Macedonia invades the Achaemenid Empire and defeats them at the Battle of Granicus River.
- 333 B.C Issus: Alexander the Great of Macedonia defeats the army of Darius III of Persia at the town of Issus in southern Anatolia.
- 218 B.C: During the Second Punic War, Hannibal, his men, and three dozen war elephants crossed the Alps in 15 days.
- 202 B.C Zama: Roman general Scipio defeats Hannibal. Carthage sues for peace.
- 146 B.C North Africa: The city of Carthage fell into the hands of the Roman Republic after the final attack led by Scipio the Younger. The city was destroyed and the remaining 50,000 Carthaginian citizens were sold into slavery. This battle ended the Punic Wars and practically ceded the remainder of Carthage's territory to the Roman Republic.
- 55 B.C Great Britain: The first Roman invasion of Britain took place when Julius Caesar and his legions landed on the British coast but were soon pushed from the area. He would return the following year with a much larger force and made better progress. However, Caesar would ultimately make peace with the British people and the Roman Republic would commence trade with them. Later Roman invasions would prove more successful.
- 821 Ireland: The first recorded Viking raid in Irish history occurred in AD 795 when Vikings, possibly from Norway looted the island of Lambay. The Viking raids on Ireland resumed in 821, the Vikings began to establish fortified encampments, longports, along the Irish coast and overwintering in Ireland instead of retreating to Scandinavia or British bases. The first known longports were at Linn Dúachaill (Annagassan) and Duiblinn (on the River Liffey, at or near present Dublin).
- 865 Great Britain: The first known account of a Viking raid in Anglo-Saxon England comes from 789, when three ships from Hordaland (in modern Norway) landed in the Isle of Portland on the southern coast of Wessex. From 865 the Norse attitude towards Great Britain changed, as they began to see it as a place for potential colonisation rather than simply a place to raid. As a result of this, larger armies began arriving on Britain's shores, with the intention of conquering land and constructing settlements there. Norse armies captured York in 867.
- 1000: Norsemen are the first Europeans to discover America. The first American-born European child is Snorri Thorfinnsson. Norsemen are the first Europeans to have a hostile confrontation with the Native Americans. These Viking explorers are likely to have used America as a source of vital goods, such as timber, to sustain the colonies of Iceland and Greenland for centuries. The colony at L'Anse aux Meadows in Canada and the Maine Penny in the United States are the most reliable proof of Norse presence in America.
- 1095: Pope Urban II proclaims the First Crusade at the Council of Clermont.
- 1099 Jerusalem: Christian European Crusaders storm Jerusalem and massacre its inhabitants.

== 15th to 18th centuries ==
- 1402: Kingdom of Castile begins with the invasion of the Canary Islands.
- 1415: The Portuguese Empire begins with the capture of Ceuta (Morocco).
- 1419: The Portuguese discover Madeira.
- 1427: The Portuguese discover Azores.
- 1441: The first consignment of slaves is brought to Lisbon (Portugal).
- 1452: Papal Bull Dum diversas allows enslavement of pagans.
- 1455: Papal Bull Romanus Pontifex grants a trade monopoly for newly discovered countries in Africa and Asia to the Portuguese.
- 1474: João Vaz Corte-Real, a Portuguese navigator, claims to have discovered the New Land of the Codfish, an unidentified island of which there is some speculation that it might be Newfoundland, in present-day Canada.
- 1481: Papal Bull Aeterni regis.
- 1482: The Portuguese build the Elmina Castle as the first trading point in Ghana.
- 1488: Bartolomeu Dias rounded the Cape of Good Hope for the Portuguese king.
- 1492: Discovery of the New World and symbolic date of the European Age of Exploration; beginning of the colonization of the Americas and of the Columbian Exchange.
- 1493: Papal Bull Inter caetera on May 4.
- 1494: Treaty of Tordesillas dividing the world outside of Europe in an exclusive duopoly between the Spanish and the Portuguese empires along a north–south meridian 370 leagues west of the Cape Verde islands (off the west coast of Africa), roughly 46° 36' W. (This boundary was known as the Line of Demarcation.) The lands to the east would belong to Portugal and the lands to the west to Spain.
- 1498: Vasco da Gama sets foot on Kozhikode, starting the Portuguese presence in India.
- 1500: Pedro Álvares Cabral sails to Brazil for the Portuguese king.
- 1511: The Portuguese capture Malacca, in present-day Malaysia.
- 1515: Spanish Leyes de Burgos on January 25.
- 1519: The Portuguese capture Ormus, in the Strait of Hormuz, in the Persian Gulf.
- 1529: Treaty of Zaragoza dividing Asia between the Spanish and Portuguese empires. With the Treaty of Tordesillas, this second demarcation line roughly splits the world in half: 191° of the earth circumference for Portugal and 169° for Spain.
- 1542: Spanish Leyes Nuevas ("New Laws").
- 1542: Creation of the Viceroyalty of Peru.
- 1550–1552: Valladolid Controversy and publication of A Short Account of the Destruction of the Indies by Bishop of Chiapas Bartolomé de las Casas.
- 1600: Queen Elizabeth I of England grants a Royal charter to the English East India Company.
- 1602: Establishment of the Dutch East India Company.
- 1607: The first permanent English settlement in North America at Jamestown, Virginia.
- 1612-1615: The Portuguese captured Gamru Port and a few other places (like Hormuz Island ) in southern coast of Persia.
- 1615–1622: Abbas I, king of Persia, battled the Portuguese with the aid of the Royal Navy and the English East India Company and recaptured those lands.
- 1619: The first African slaves arrive in Jamestown, Virginia.
- 1624: The English set foot in Surat.
- 1625: Charles I of England receives Oldman, king of the Miskito Nation, who was taken to England by the Earl of Warwick.
- 1630: Puritans establish Massachusetts Bay Colony.
- 1651-1664: Couronian colonization of Africa.
- 1717: Creation of the Viceroyalty of New Granada.
- 1775-1783: American War of Independence.
- 1776: Creation of the Viceroyalty of the Río de la Plata.
- 1776: The original Thirteen Colonies of the United States, also known as the United Colonies, declare independence from Britain.
- 1784: Britain passes Pitt's India Act.
- 1787: Britain creates Sierra Leone.
- 1788: Britain claims and proceeds to settle the eastern half of the continent of Australia.
- 1791-1804: Haitian Revolution and abolition of slavery by the French First Republic (reestablished by Napoleon in 1804).
- 1795: Britain invades the Cape region of present-day South Africa.
- 1798: French Invasion of Egypt.

== 19th century to World War I ==
- 1804–1813: Uprising in Serbia against the presence of the Ottoman Empire.
- 1810–1820s: Spanish American wars of independence.
- 1810–1821: Mexican War of Independence.
- 1815–1817: Serbian uprising leading to Serbian autonomy.
- 1820: The American Colonization Society (private citizens in the United States) created Liberia.
- 1821–1823: Greek War of Independence.
- 1822: Independence of Brazil proclaimed by Dom Pedro I.
- 1830: Start of the French conquest of Algeria.
- 1833: British abolish slavery in the West Indies; The owners are reimbursed.
- 1834: Beginning of the Boers' Great Trek.
- 1839: Papal Encyclical In Supremo Apostolatus, condemning the slave trade.
- 1839–1842: First Opium War and First Anglo-Afghan War.
- 1846–1848: Mexican–American War, which results in the Mexican Cession.
- 1848: Decree-law Victor Schœlcher which abolish slavery (permanently) in the French colonial empire.
- 1856–1860: Second Opium War.
- 1857: Uprising in India against British occupation, which leads to the creation of the British Raj.
- 1861–1867: French intervention in Mexico ordered by Napoleon III.
- 1870: Franco-Prussian War.
- 1870–1880s: Conquest of the Desert in Argentina, led by Julio Argentino Roca.
- 1877–1878: War between Russia and the Ottoman Empire and March 3, 1878 Treaty of San Stefano.
- 1878: Treaty of Berlin recognising the independence of Romania, Serbia and Montenegro and the autonomy of Bulgaria.
- 1878–1881: Second Anglo-Afghan War.
- 1879: Anglo-Zulu War.
- 1880–81: First Boer War
- 1881: Indigenous Code in Algeria.
- 1883: Publication of The Story of an African Farm by Olive Schreiner.
- 1884–85: Berlin Conference (UK, France, Germany) which sets the right of conquest for the scramble for Africa.
- 1885: Foundation of the Indian National Congress.
- 1885: Treaty of Simulambuco (between Portugal and the N'Goyo Kingdom).
- 1887: France creates the Indochinese Union.
- 1888: Lei Áurea ("Golden Law") on May 13 in Brazil which abolish slavery.
- 1889: Foundation of the Republic of Brazil.
- 1889: British South Africa Company of Cecil Rhodes chartered by the British government to seek treaties and administer territory between the Limpopo River and African Great Lakes.
- 1890: Cecil Rhodes sends the Pioneer Column into Mashonaland, starting the process of annexing the territory which became Southern Rhodesia.
- 1891: The Stairs Expedition to Katanga kills its king, Msiri and obtains treaties from his successors for the territory to become the possession of Leopold II of Belgium.
- 1895: Treaty of Shimonoseki between Japan and China and Triple Intervention.
- 1895: Creation of French West Africa (AOF).
- 1895–1896: First Italo-Ethiopian War.
- 1896: Anglo-Zanzibar War (on August 27).
- 1897: Punitive Expedition led by British Admiral Harry Rawson against Benin, which brings to an end the highly sophisticated West African Kingdom of Benin.
- 1898: Fashoda Incident.
- 1898: Spanish–American War. United States defeated Spain and seizes Cuba, Puerto Rico, and the Philippines.
- 1899: Publication of Rudyard Kipling's The White Man's Burden, as well as Joseph Conrad's Heart of Darkness.
- 1899--1901: The Boxer Rebellion begins in Qing dynasty China, but is defeated by the Eight Nation Alliance.
- 1899–1902: Second Boer War.
- 1899–1913: Philippine–American War.
- 1902: Anglo-Japanese Alliance: end of Britain's Splendid isolation.
- 1904–05: Russo-Japanese War won by Japan.
- 1904–07: Herero Genocide.
- 1905: Partition of Bengal.
- 1905: First Moroccan Crisis after the March 31, 1905 visit of Kaiser Wilhelm to Tangiers.
- 1906: Algeciras Conference to mediate the Tangier Crisis between France and Germany.
- 1910: Creation of French Equatorial Africa (AEF).
- 1911: Agadir Crisis.
- 1911: Chinese Revolution.
- 1912: France establish a full protectorate over Morocco.
- 1912–1913: Italo-Turkish War (Tripolitania and Cyrenaica are transferred from the Ottoman Empire to Italy).
- 1914–1918: World War I.
- 1916: May 16 Sykes-Picot Agreement.
- 1916–1918: Arab Revolt initiated by Hussein bin Ali and Emir Faisal.
- 1918: Woodrow Wilson's January 9 speech on the Fourteen Points.

== Interwar period ==
- 1919: Foundation of the League of Nations at the Paris Peace Conference and creation of the League of Nations Mandates (Iraq and Palestine — including Transjordan — are passed to Great Britain's control, Lebanon and Syria to France; the Cameroons and Togoland are split between the UK and France; Ruanda-Urundi goes to Belgium and Tanganyika to the UK; Nauru and New Guinea to Australia; the remainder of German New Guinea to Japan as the South Seas Mandate; Samoa to New Zealand and South West Africa to South Africa).
- 1919: Third Anglo-Afghan War.
- 1919: Anti-imperialist Non-Cooperation Movement led by Mahatma Gandhi.
- 1920: San Remo conference in April.
- 1920: Treaty of Sèvres on August 10 between the Triple Entente (UK, France and Russia) and the Ottoman Empire; Mustafa Kemal leads the Turkish War of Independence leading to the 1923 Treaty of Lausanne.
- 1922: Creation of the Soviet Union.
- 1923: Proclamation of the Republic of Turkey by Mustafa Kemal on October 29.
- 1924: British Empire Exhibition.
- 1925: Foundation of the Algerian Star of North Africa by Messali Hadj.
- 1921–1926: Rif War in Morocco, led by Abd el-Krim.
- 1927: May 19 Treaty of Jeddah accords independence to Saudi Arabia led by King Abdul Aziz.
- 1927–1928: Publication of André Gide's Voyage au Congo (Travels in the Congo).
- 1931: Paris Colonial Exposition.
- 1931: Dominions of Australia, Canada, New Zealand, and South Africa gain independence from Britain.
- 1932: Independence of Iraq.
- 1930: Portuguese Colonial Act.
- 1933: Publication of Gilberto Freyre's Casa-Grande & Senzala ("The Great House and the Slave Quarters" - 1933).
- 1935: Aimé Césaire coins the word Négritude.
- 1936: Franco-Syrian Treaty of Independence (never ratified by France).
- 1936–1939: Great Arab Revolt in the British Mandate of Palestine.
- 1935–36: Second Italo-Abyssinian War.

== World War II, and Cold War until the Détente ==
- 1939-1945: World War II
- 1941: Atlantic charter Endorsed by all the Allies of World War II; Calls for self-determination.
- 1941: Foundation of the Viet Minh by Ho Chi Minh.
- 1941: Syria proclaims its independence from Vichy France, which is recognized in 1944.
- 1942: Quit India Movement called for by Gandhi on August 9.
- 1943: Independence of Lebanon.
- 1944: Nelson Mandela joins the African National Congress.
- 1945: Allies of World War II form the United Nations in San Francisco.
- 1945: Sétif massacre in Algeria on May 8.
- 1945: Proclamation of the independence of Indonesia by Sukarno & Mohammad Hatta.
- 1945: Proclamation of the independence of Vietnam by Ho Chi Minh.
- 1945: Foundation of the Arab League on March 22 (Egypt, Iraq, Jordan, Lebanon, Saudi Arabia, Syria and Yemen).
- 1945: Fifty states sign the Charter of the United Nations on June 26.
- 1945–1950: Chinese Civil War between the nationalist Kuomintang and the Communist Party led by Mao Zedong.
- 1946–1954: First Indochina War.
- 1947: Official start of the Cold War (see Cold War (1947-1953) and Cold War (1953-1962)).
- 1947: Independence of India and of Pakistan (Pakistan came into being on August 14, and India on August 15).
- 1947: UN Resolution 181 on the partition of Palestine in favor of a Two-state solution.
- 1947: French repression of the Malagasy uprising. 90 to 100 000 killed.
- 1948: Declaration of the independence of the State of Israel on May 14 and first Arab-Israeli War.
- 1948: Colonial exhibition in Belgium.
- 1949: Proclamation of the People's Republic of China by Mao Zedong.
- 1951: Publication of Hannah Arendt's The Origins of Totalitarianism (second section dedicated to imperialism).
- 1952: Alfred Sauvy coins the term "Third World".
- 1954: French establishments in India cease to exist after de facto transfer to the Republic of India (de jure union accomplished in 1962).
- 1954: Battle of Dien Bien Phu & 1954 Geneva Accords marks the end of French Indochina.
- 1955: Bandung Conference.
- 1956: Suez Crisis between Israel, the UK and France against Egypt, after Nasser's nationalisation of the Suez Canal Company.
- 1957: Algerian independence militant Larbi Ben M'Hidi murdered in prison, early March.
- 1957: First country sub-Saharan Africa (Ghana) regains independence.
- 1958: Foundation of the United Arab Republic as a first step toward a Pan-Arab nation; it is formed by Egypt and Syria (until 1961). Creation also of the short-term Arab Federation of Iraq and Jordan.
- 1959: Independence of Morocco and Tunisia.
- 1960: Independence of French colonies in Africa; the UN reach 99 members states.
- 1961: Assassination of Patrice Lumumba, first prime minister of the Democratic Republic of the Congo, on January 17.
- 1961: Formation of the Conferência das Organizações Nacionalistas das Colónias Portuguesas on April 18 in Casablanca, Morocco (PAIGC, MPLA, FRELIMO and MLSTP).
- 1961: Creation of the Non-Aligned Movement.
- 1961: Soviet premier Khrushchev declares that the Soviet Union would support all "national liberation movements".
- 1961: Publication of Frantz Fanon' The Wretched of the Earth.
- 1961: October 17 Paris massacre.
- 1961: Indian annexation of Goa ends Portuguese India (Goa, Dadra, Nagar Haveli, Daman and Diu).
- 1961–1974: Portuguese Colonial War; See also Angolan War of Independence (1961-1989).
- 1962: Évian Accords halts the Algerian War and puts end to French rule in North-Africa.

== 1963 to the fall of the Berlin Wall ==
- 1963: Assassination of Sylvanus Olympio on January 13, first president of Togo; he is replaced by Gnassingbé Eyadéma, who ruled over Togo until his death in 2005.
- 1965–1975: Vietnam War.
- 1965: Assassination of Mehdi Ben Barka, leader of the UNPF and of the Tricontinental Conference.
- 1965: Joseph Mobutu becomes the dictator of the Democratic Republic of Congo until his overthrow in 1997 by Laurent-Désiré Kabila.
- 1969: Assassination of Eduardo Mondlane, leader of the FRELIMO.
- 1970s: Independence of the former Portuguese colonies, following the April 25, 1974 Carnation Revolution and the Portuguese Colonial War.
- 1971: Independence of Bangladesh following the war with Pakistan.
- 1971: Publication of Eduardo Galeano's Open Veins of Latin America.
- 1971: Publication of Gustavo Gutiérrez's A Theology of Liberation: History, Politics, Salvation.
- 1973: Assassination of Amilcar Cabral, leader of the African Party for the Independence of Guinea and Cape Verde (PAIGC) on January 20.
- 1973: The PAIGC proclaims the independence of Guinea-Bissau on September 24.
- 1975: Portugal recognizes Mozambique's independence on June 25 and Angola on November 11.
- November 1975: Green March during which Morocco annexes Western Sahara, formerly part of Spanish Morocco.
- 1979: Soviet invasion of Afghanistan and start of the "Second Cold War".
- 1980: The UN reaches 154 member states.
- 1980: Assassination of Óscar Romero, prelate archbishop of San Salvador and proponent of the Liberation theology, on March 24.
- 1982: Latin American debt crisis (in particular in Mexico, Brazil and Argentina).
- 1988: Assassination of Dulcie September, member of the African National Congress.
- 1989: Operation Just Cause against Manuel Noriega.
- 1990: Independence of Namibia, the UN reaches 159 states.

== 1990s onwards ==
- 1994: Nelson Mandela becomes president of South Africa in the nation's first all race election, ending colonial apartheid in the country.
- 2001: French law recognizing slavery and the Atlantic slave trade as crimes against humanity (Taubira Law).
- 2005: February 23 French law on the "positive aspects" of "French presence abroad, in particular in North Africa."
- 2006: Repeal of the February 23, 2005 French law, following criticisms of historical revisionism.
- 2010: Dissolution of the Netherlands Antilles.
- 2021: Barbados becomes the first Commonwealth realm in the 21st century and second in the former British West Indies to transition to a republic.
- 2025: Britain agrees to hand over all constituent islands of the Chagos Archipelago to Mauritius except for Diego Garcia, which is to remain a British territory stationing a military base for 99 years.

== See also ==
- Timeline of European imperialism
- Colonialism
- International relations (1814–1919)
- Wars of national liberation
- Decolonization
- British colonization of the Americas
- Former colonies and territories in Canada
- French colonization of the Americas
- Spanish colonization of the Americas
- List of French possessions and colonies
