= Mramor =

Mramor can mean:

- Mramor, Sofia City Province, a village near Sofia, Bulgaria
- Mramor (mountain), a mountain in Kosovo
- Mramor (Niš), a village in Serbia
- Mramor (Kakanj), a village in the municipality of Kakanj, Bosnia and Herzegovina
- Mramor, Tuzla, a village in the municipality of Tuzla, Bosnia and Herzegovina
